= List of people from Portland, Oregon =

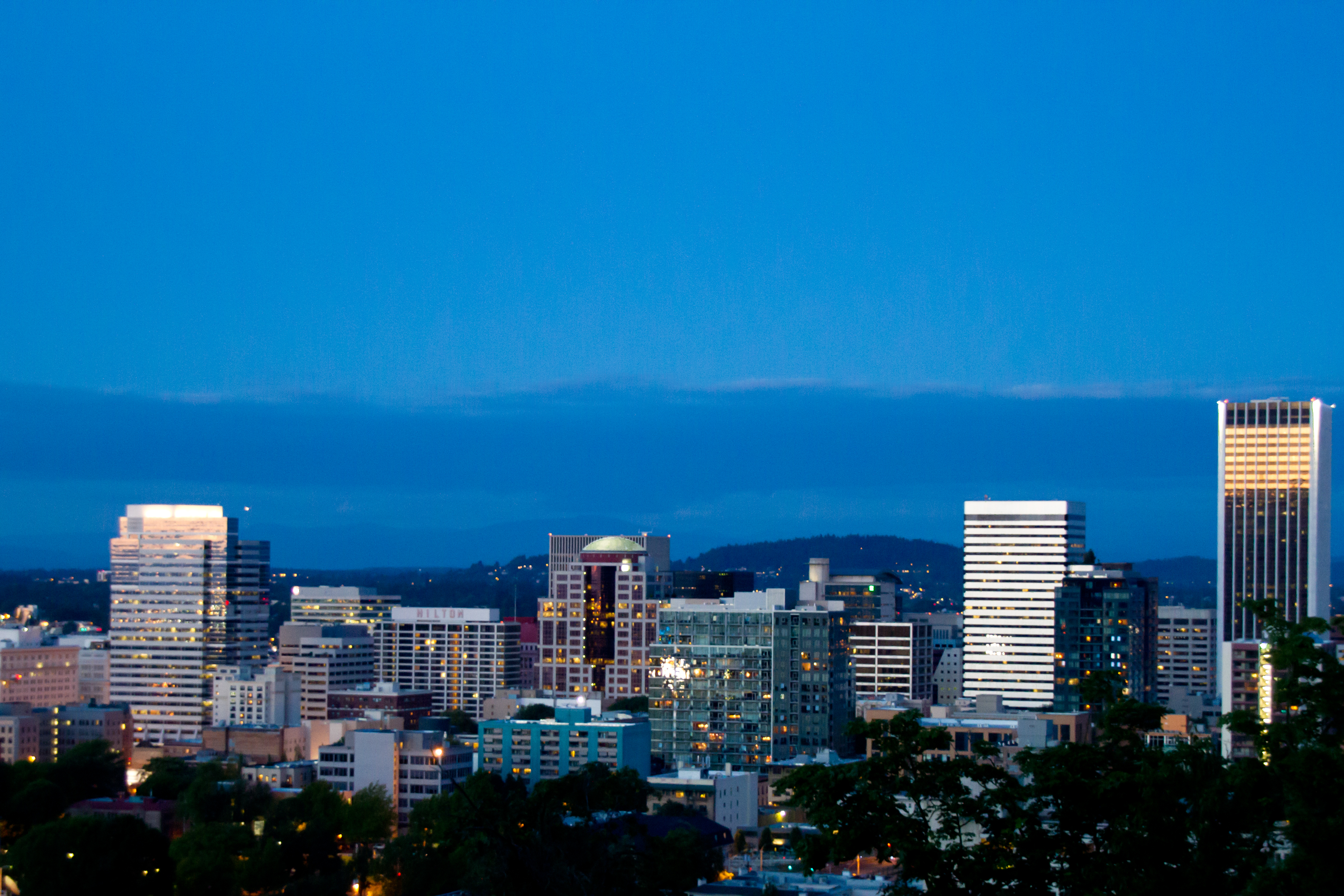
Portland skyline at twilight

Portland is a port city in the U.S. state of Oregon located at the confluence of the Willamette and Columbia Rivers. Established in the 1830s as a camp along the Oregon Trail, Portland evolved into a major West Coast industrial city during the twentieth century. Contemporarily, it is the most populous city in Oregon, and the second-largest city in the Pacific Northwest.

This list of notable people includes persons who were either born in, are current residents of, or have lived in Portland. A person who lives in or comes from Portland, Oregon is called a Portlander.

== A ==
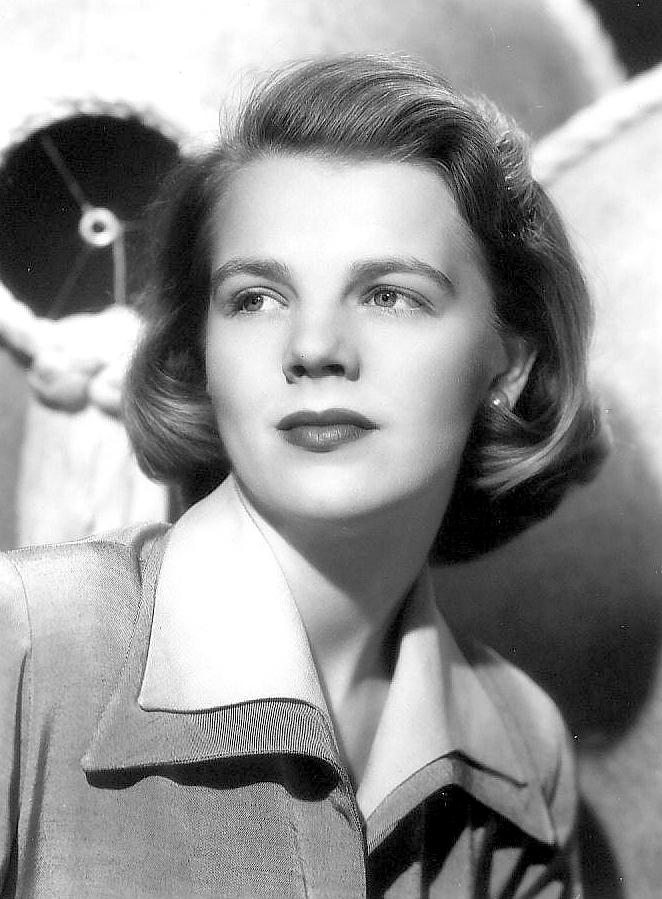
Rachel Ames, actress

Person	Lifespan	Notability	Born	Ref.
Mick Abel	2001-	Baseball player	Yes	
Bruce Abbott	1954–	Actor	Yes	
Alvin P. Adams, Jr.	1942–2015	Diplomat	Yes	
Arthur Adams	1963–	Comic book artist	No	
Sam Adams	1963–	Former mayor of Portland	No	
Obo Addy	1936–2012	Musician	No	
Brad Adkins	1973–	Artist	No	
Frances Payne Adler		Poet	No	
Jerome Alden	1921–1997	Playwright, screenwriter	Yes	
Pauline Alderman	1893–1983	Musicologist, composer	No	
Art Alexakis	1962–	Musician	No	
James H. Allen	1928–2015	Clown, author	Yes	
Laura Allen	1974–	Actress	Yes	
Goli Ameri	1956–	Diplomat, businesswoman	No	
Rachel Ames	1929–	Actress	Yes	
Bob Amsberry	1928–1957	Actor	Yes	
Larry Andersen	1953–	Major League Baseball player	Yes	
Marian Anderson	1897–1993	Singer	No	
Marisa Anderson		Musician	No	
Signe Toly Anderson	1941–2016	Singer	No	
Debra Arlyn	1986–	Singer-songwriter	No	
Arledge Armenaki	1949–	Cinematographer	Yes	
Garner Ted Armstrong	1930–2003	Televangelist	Yes	
Hal Ashby	1929–1988	Film director and editor	No	
Victor G. Atiyeh	1923–2014	32nd governor of Oregon	Yes	
Ray Atkeson	1907–1990	Photographer	No	
George H. Atkinson	1819–1889	Missionary	No	
Jean M. Auel	1936–	Author	No	
Thomas J. Autzen	1888–1958	Plywood manufacturing innovator	No	

== B ==
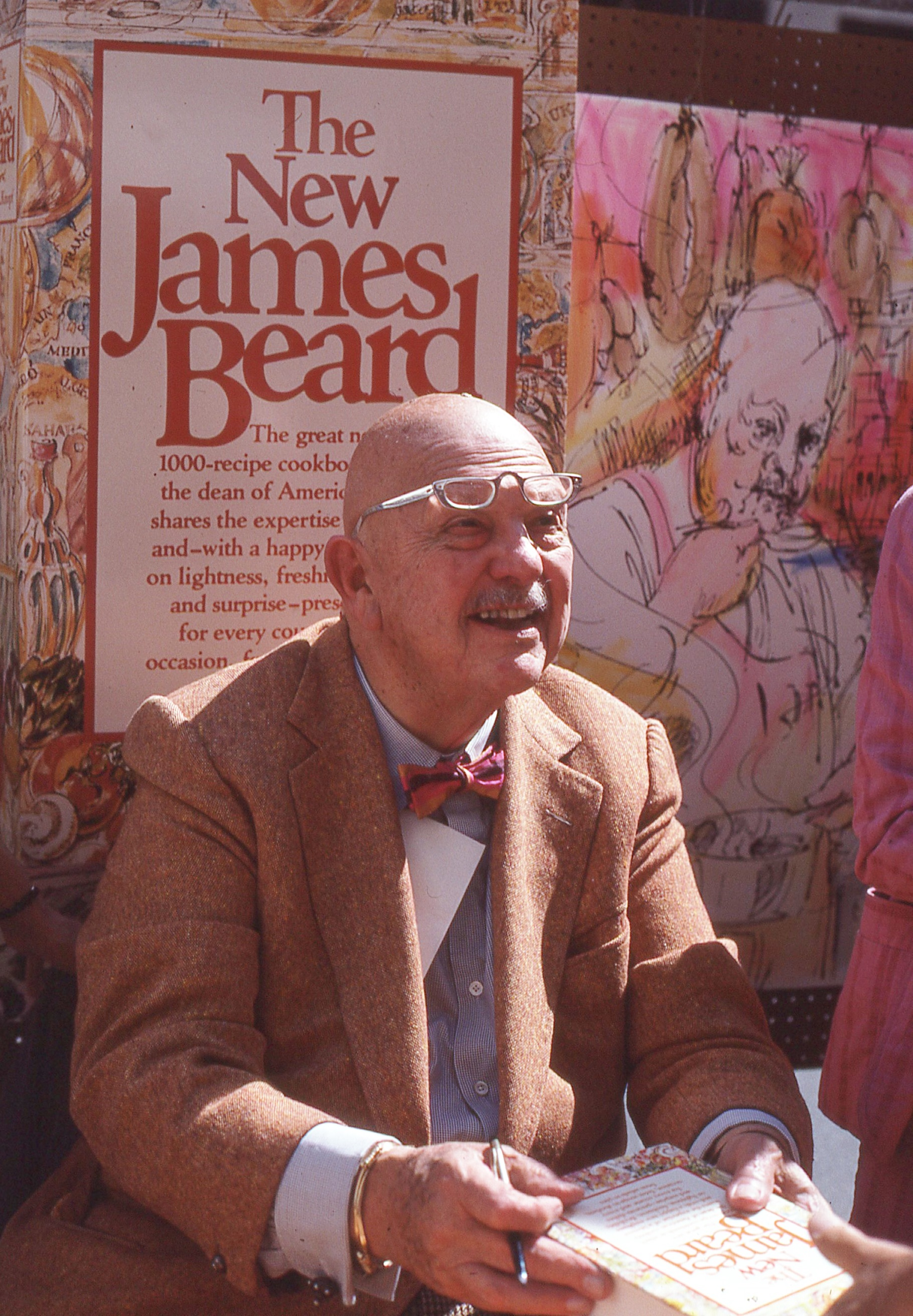
James Beard, food expert

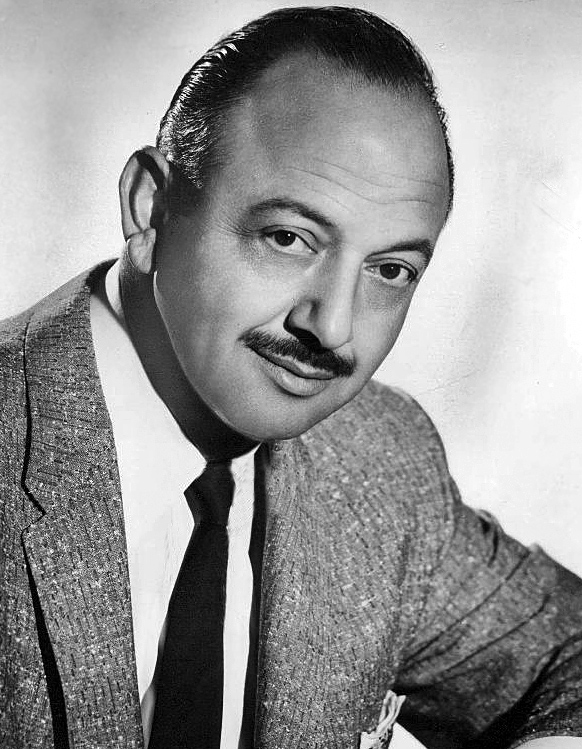
Mel Blanc, voice actor

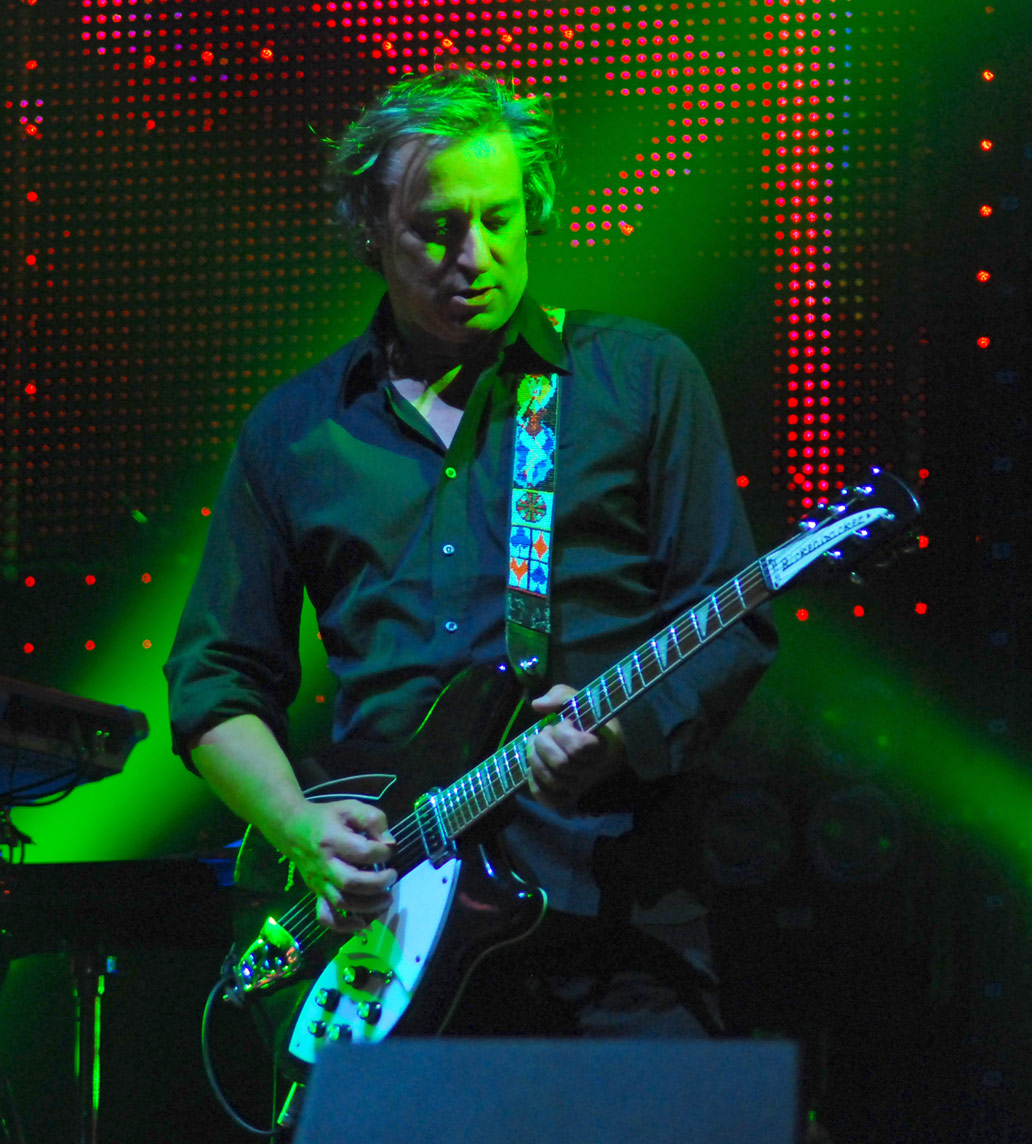
Peter Buck, lead guitarist of R.E.M.

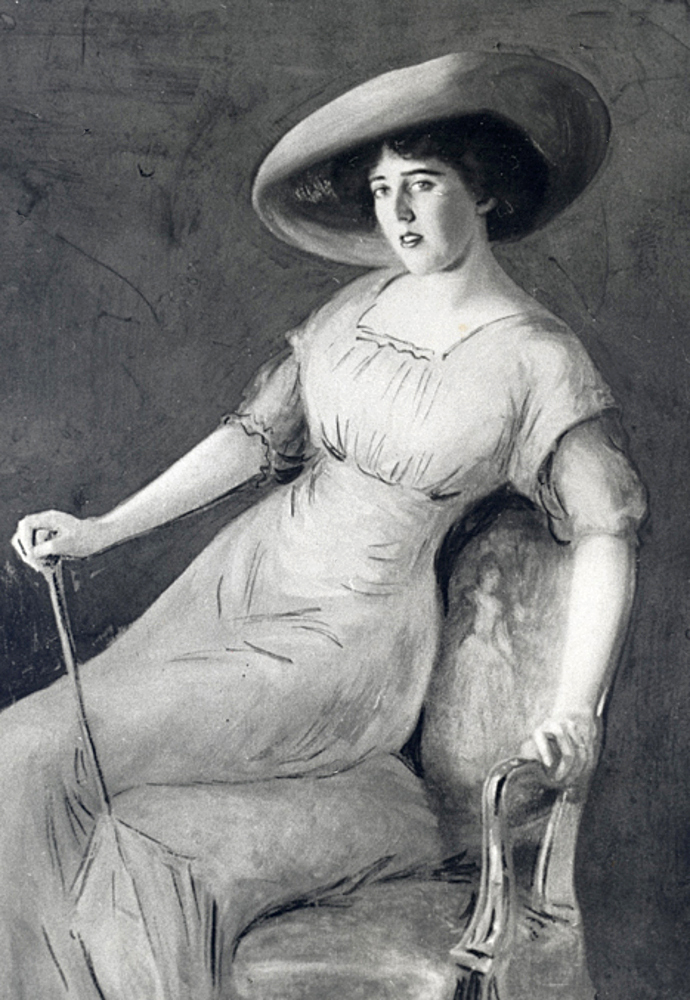
Louise Bryant, journalist

Person	Lifespan	Notability	Born	Ref.
Preston Bailey	2000–	Actor	Yes	
Terry Baker	1941–	Attorney, athlete	No	
Brenda Bakke	1963–	Actress	No	
Ireland Baldwin	1995–	Model	No	
Lola Baldwin	1860–1957	One of first policewomen in the United States	No	
Lance Bangs	1972–	Filmmaker	No	
Daniel E. Barbey	1989-1969	U.S. Navy admiral	Yes	
Art Barr	1966–1994	Professional wrestler	Yes	
Willie Barrow	1924–2015	Civil rights activist	No	
Blanche Bates	1873–1941	Actress	Yes	
Peter Baum	1990–	Lacrosse player	No	
Scott Beach	1931–1996	Actor	Yes	
James Beard	1903–1985	Food expert	Yes	
Jona Bechtolt	1980–	Musician	No	
Larry Bell	1923–1986	Football player	Yes	
Pietro Belluschi	1899–1994	Architect	No	
Scott Benedetti	1966–	Soccer player	Yes	
John Virginius Bennes	1867–1943	Architect	No	
Simon Benson	1852–1942	Philanthropist, logger	No	
Becca Bernstein	1977–	Artist	No	
Boston Billups	2005–	Soccer player	Yes	
Marion Blackburn	1939–2025	Entrepreneur and tennis professional	No	
Mel Blanc	1908–1989	Voice actor	No	
Lance Blankenship	1963–	Major League Baseball player, World Series champion	Yes	
M. Blash	1978–	Filmmaker	No	
Sheila Bleck	1974–	Bodybuilder	Yes	
Rachel Blumberg	1969–	Drummer	Yes	
Earl Blumenauer	1948–	Democratic U.S. representative	Yes	
Wally Boag	1920–2011	Actor	Yes	
William H. Boring	1841–1932	Union soldier, founder of Boring, Oregon	No	
Chris Botti	1962–	Composer, trumpeter	Yes	
Terrell Brandon	1970–	NBA all-star	Yes	
Matt Braunger	1974–	Standup comedian	No	
Thom Bray	1954–	Actor	No	
Isaac Brock	1975–	Singer, frontman of Modest Mouse	No	
David Brooks	1915–1999	Actor	Yes	
Chuck Bown	1954–	NASCAR racer	Yes	
Jim Bown	1960–	NASCAR racer	Yes	
Chris Brown	1977–	Soccer player	Yes	
Cindy Brown	1965–	Professional basketball player	Yes	
Mel Brown	1944–	Jazz drummer	Yes	
Melville W. Brown	1887–1938	Silent film director	Yes	
Tiffany Lee Brown		Writer, editor	No	
Carrie Brownstein	1974–	Musician, actor	No	
Agnes Bruckner	1985–	Actress	No	
Monique de Bruin	1977–	Retired fencer	Yes	
Louise Bryant	1885–1936	Journalist, writer	No	
Dean F. Bryson	1910–1995	Politician, lawyer	Yes	
Peter Buck	1956–	Guitarist of R.E.M.	No	
Jack Buetel	1915–1989	Actor	No	
Barbara Buono	1953–	Politician	No	
Geraldine Bureker	1924–2009	All-American girls professional baseball player	Yes	
Helen Burgess	1916–1937	Actress	Yes	
Caroline Burke	1913–1964	Actress, art collector	Yes	
Kevin Burke	1950–	Musician, master Irish fiddler	No	
Doris Burn	1923–2011	Children's author, illustrator	Yes	
Mabel Byrd	1895–1988	Civil rights activist; first African-American to attend the University of Oregon	No	

== C ==
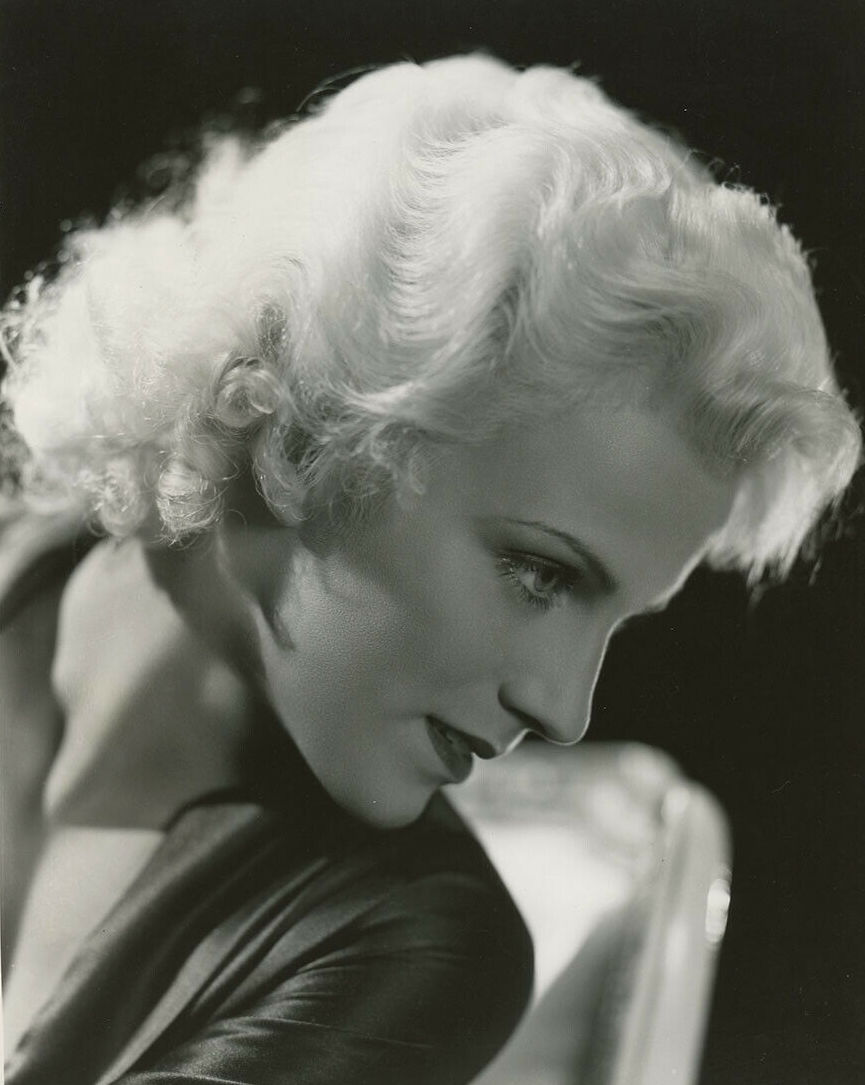
Jean Carmen, actress

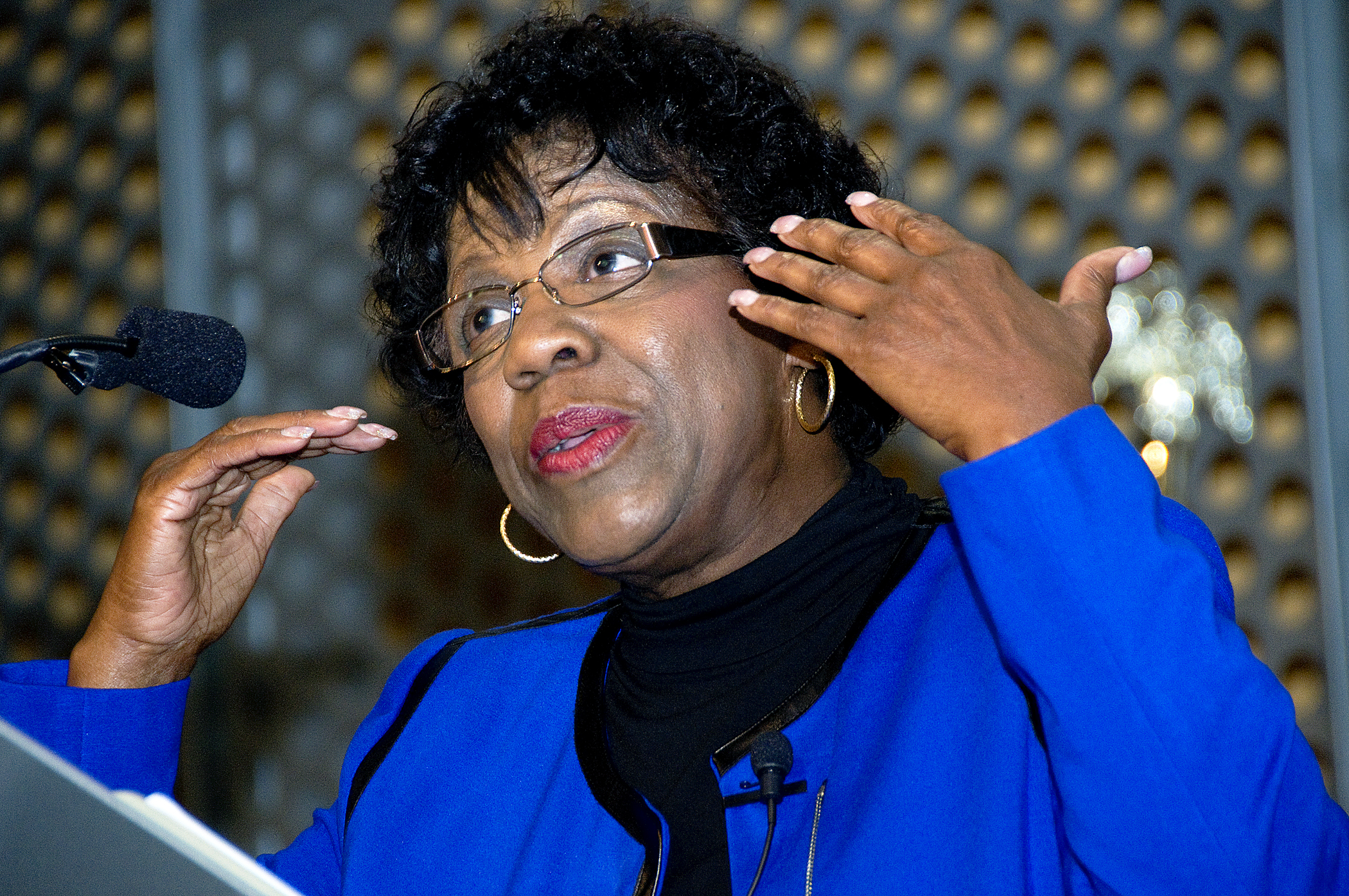
Margaret Carter, politician

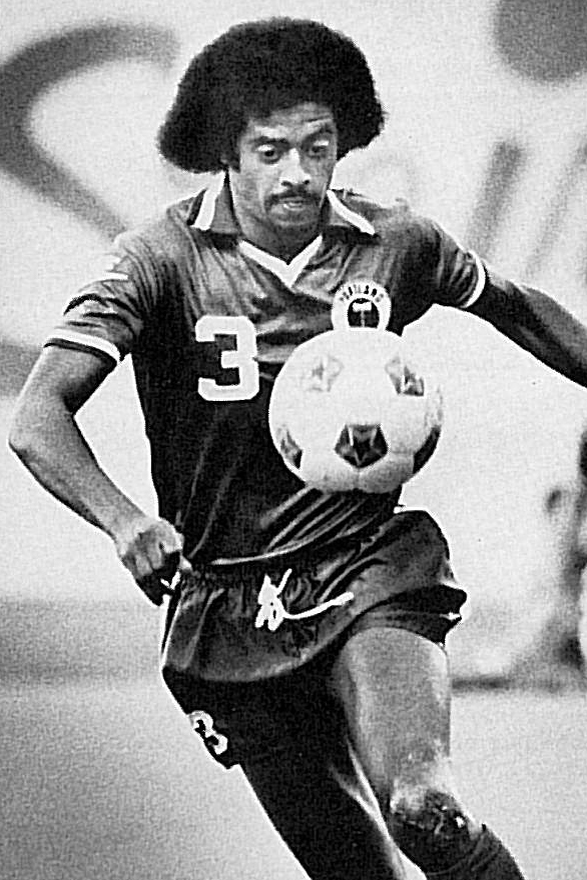
Clive Charles, English-born soccer player and coach

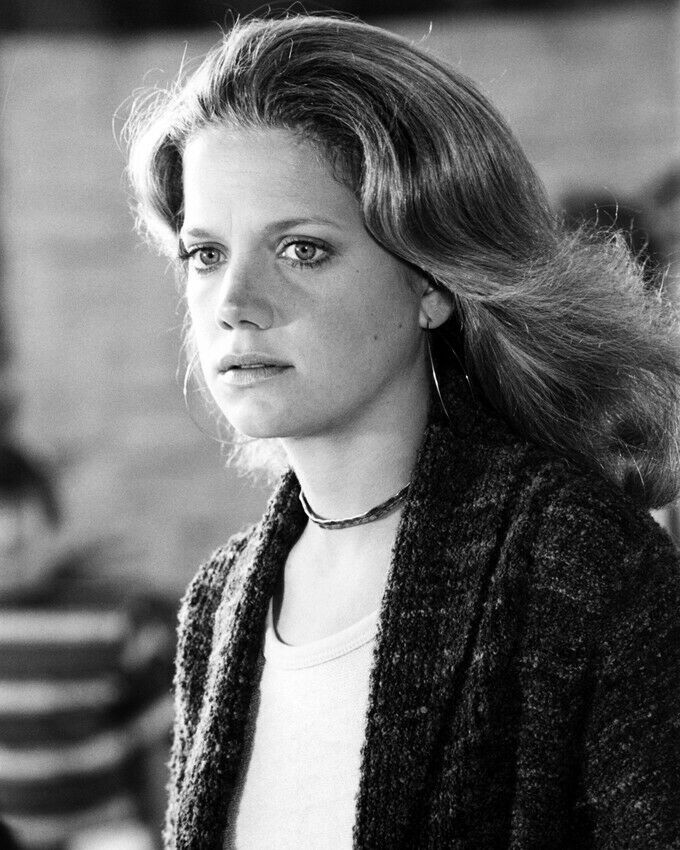
Gretchen Corbett, actress

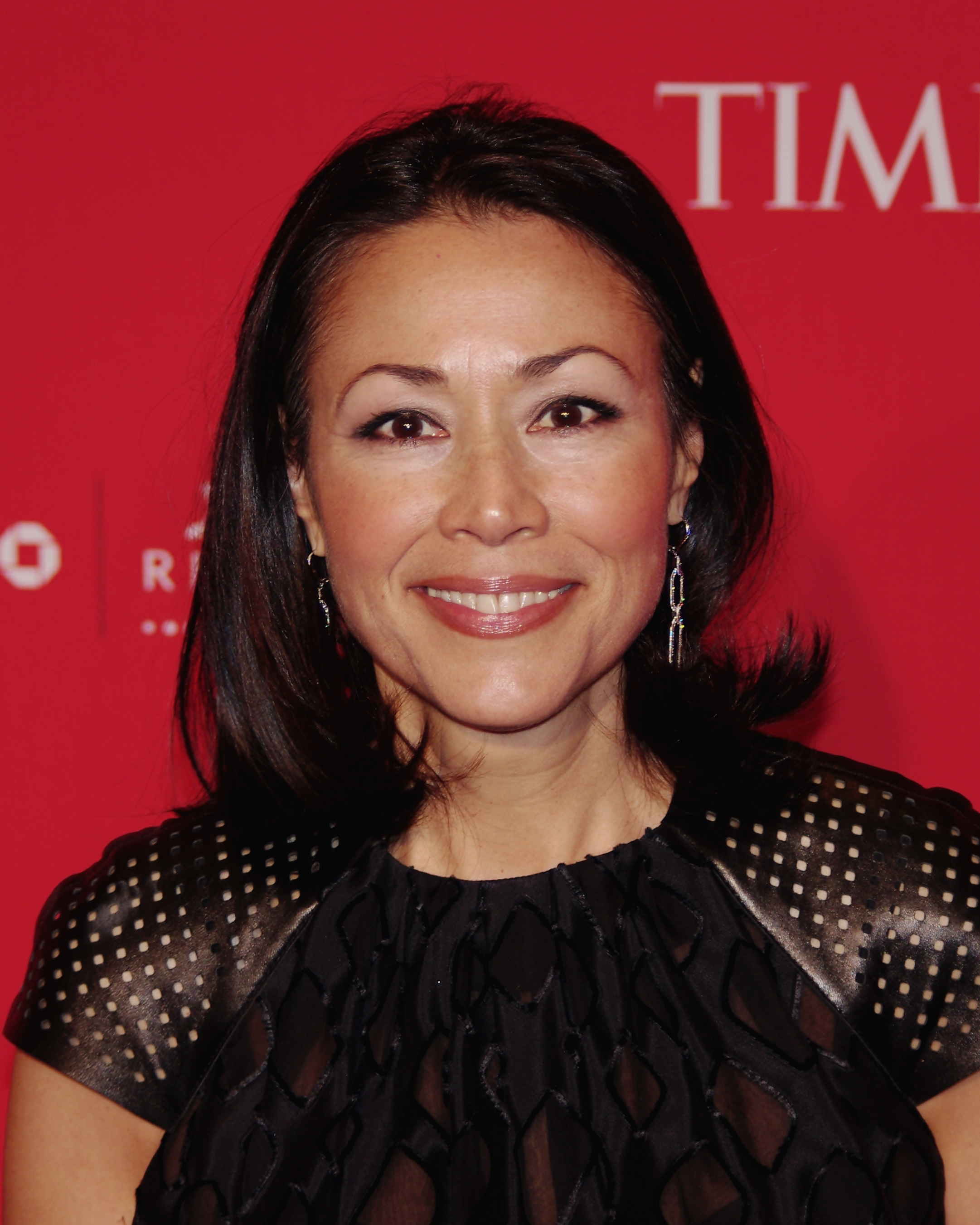
Ann Curry, journalist

Person	Lifespan	Notability	Born	Ref.
John Callahan	1951–2010	Cartoonist	Yes	
Cathy Camper		Artist, author	No	
Dirk Carlson	1998–	Soccer player; represented Luxembourg	Yes	
Jean Carmen	1913–1993	Actress	Yes	
Jewel Carmen	1897–1984	Actress	Yes	
Cletis Carr	1959–	Musician	Yes	
John Francis Carroll	1858–1917	Publisher	No	
Margaret Carter	1935–	Politician	No	
Sandra Cassel	1952–	Actress, acting coach	No	
Michael Cassidy	1983–	Actor	Yes	
Mark Chamberlin	1955–2011	Actor	Yes	
Erin Chambers	1979–	Actress	Yes	
William W. Chapman	1808–1892	Politician, lawyer	No	
Walter Chappell	1925–2000	Photographer	Yes	
Clive Charles	1951–2003	British soccer player, coach	No	
Trevor Chowning	1972-	Pop artist	No	
Janet Chvatal	1964–	Classical soprano, director	Yes	
Bernice Claire	1906–2003	Actress, singer	No	
Jillian Clare	1992–	Actress	Yes	
Beverly Cleary	1916–2021	Author	No	
Brad Cloepfil	1956–	Architect	Yes	
Michelle Clunie	1969–	Actress	Yes	
Ryan Cochrane	1983–	Soccer player	Yes	
Henry Waldo Coe	1857–1927	Physician, politician	No	
Scott Coffey	1967–	Filmmaker, actor	No	
Stephen Coffin	1807–1882	Investor, militia officer	No	
Marissa Coleman	1987–	WNBA player	Yes	
Harvey Collins	1925-1957	Serial killer	Yes	
Monte Collins	1898–1951	Actor, director	No	
Booth Colman	1923–2014	Actor	Yes	
Santo Condorelli	1995–	Olympic swimmer	No	
Paul Conway	1970–	Soccer player	Yes	
Donald Cook	1901–1961	Actor	Yes	
Cool Nutz	1972–	Rapper, entertainer and radio personality	Yes	
Barbara Coombs	1947–	President of Compassion & Choices	No	
Colleen Coover	1969–	Comic artist	Yes	
Alfred H. Corbett	1915–2000	Attorney, politician	Yes	
Gretchen Corbett	1947–	Actress	Yes	
Henry W. Corbett	1827–1903	Industrialist, U.S. senator	No	
Judy Cornell	1933–2021	Olympic swimmer	Yes	
Robert Cornthwaite	1917–2006	Actor	No	
John H. Couch	1811–1870	Sea captain, co-founder of Portland	No	
Lucy Covington	1910–1982	Political activist	No	
Colin Cowherd	1963–	Sports media host	No	
Joseph Buford Cox	1905–2002	Entrepreneur, inventor of chainsaw chain	Yes	
Tom Cramer	1960–	Artist	Yes	
Larry Crane		Publisher of Tape Op	No	
Ryan Crouser	1992–	Olympic shot putter and discus thrower	Yes	
Dan Cunneen	1963–	Musician	Yes	
Imogen Cunningham	1883–1976	Photographer	Yes	
Ward Cunningham	1949–	Inventor of wiki	No	
Zamah Cunningham	1892–1967	Actress	Yes	
Ann Curry	1956–	Journalist	No	
Michael Curry	1967–	Costume and puppet designer	No	
Walt Curtis	1941–	Poet, novelist	Yes	

== D ==
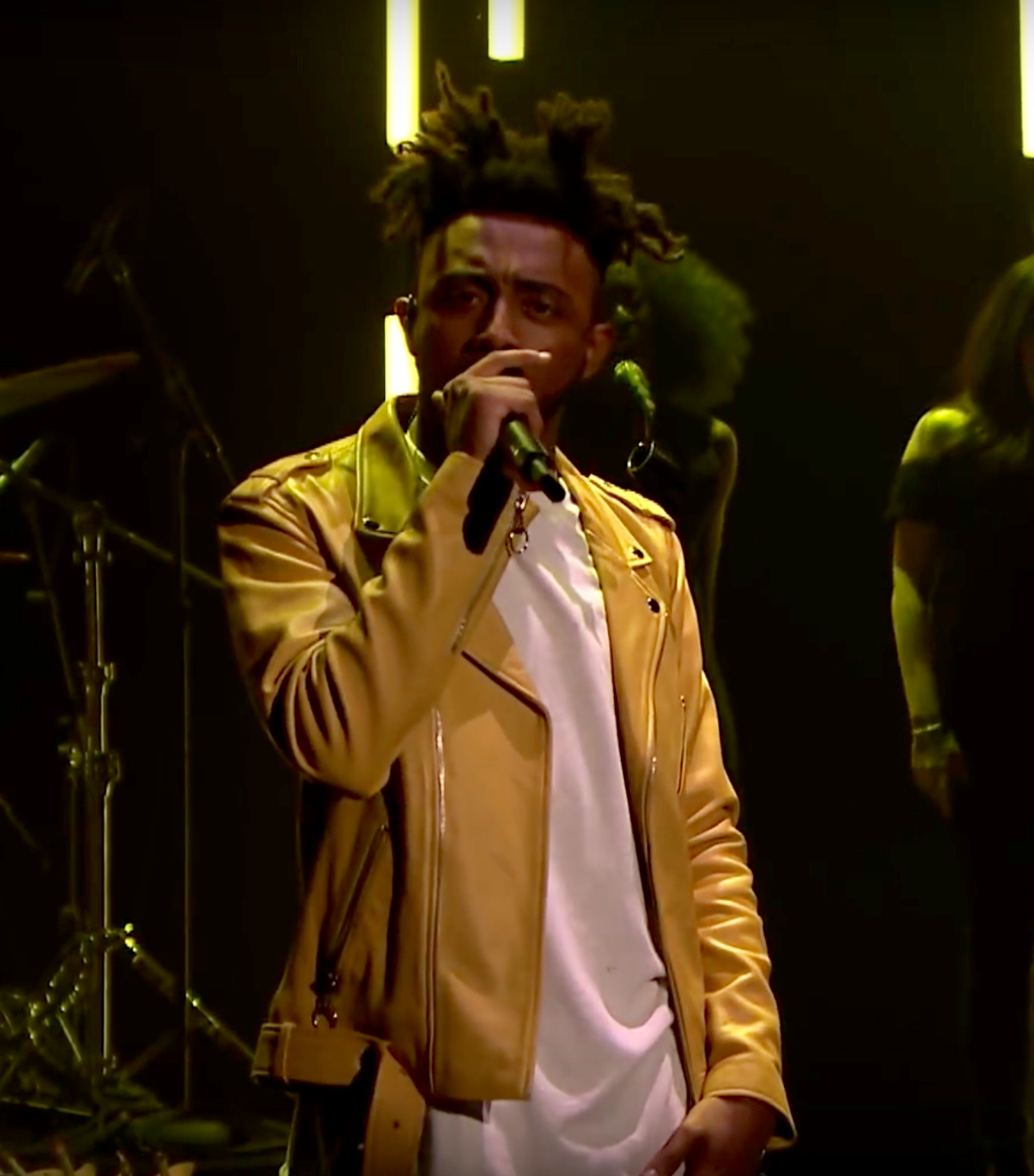
Aminé Daniel, rapper

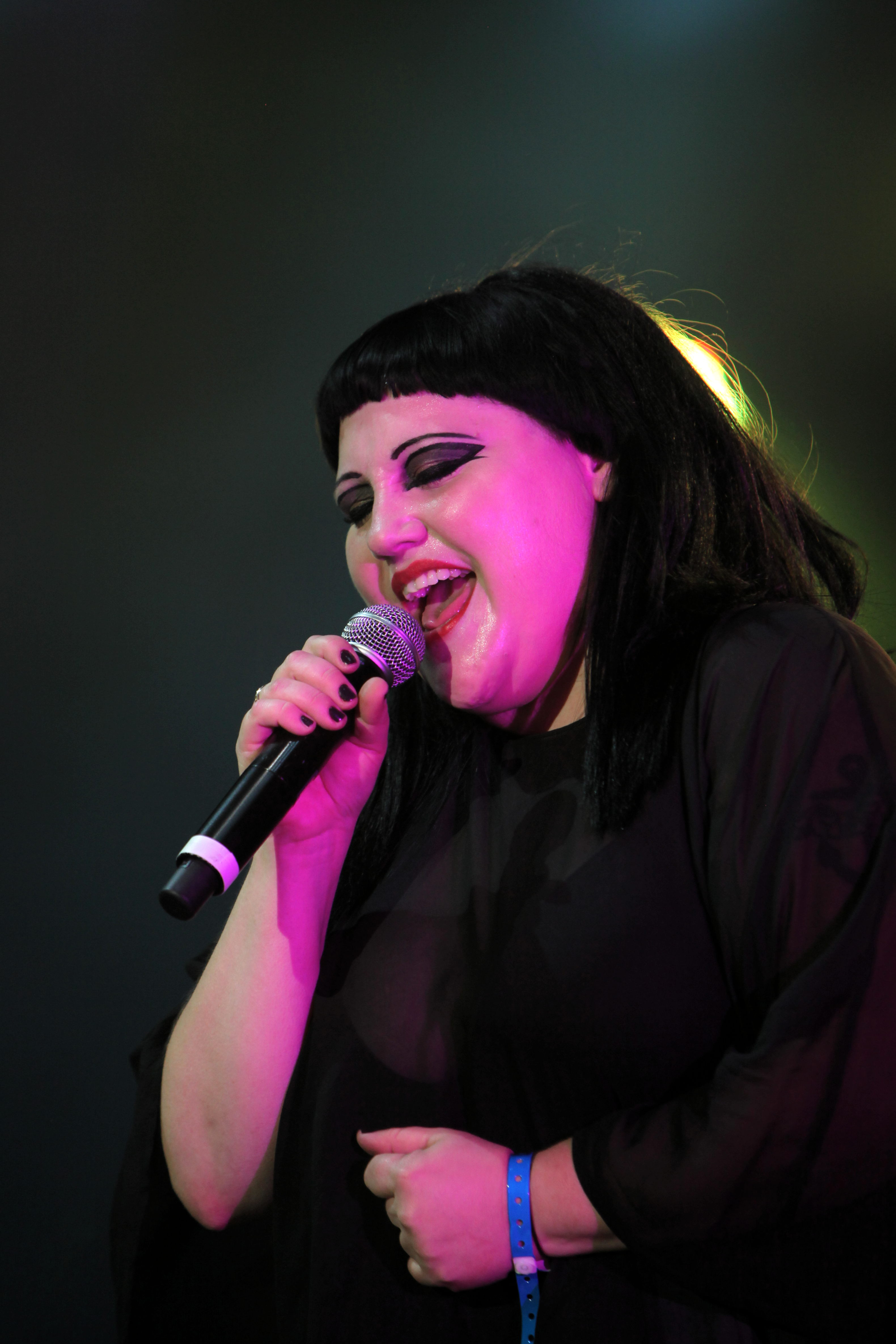
Beth Ditto, singer

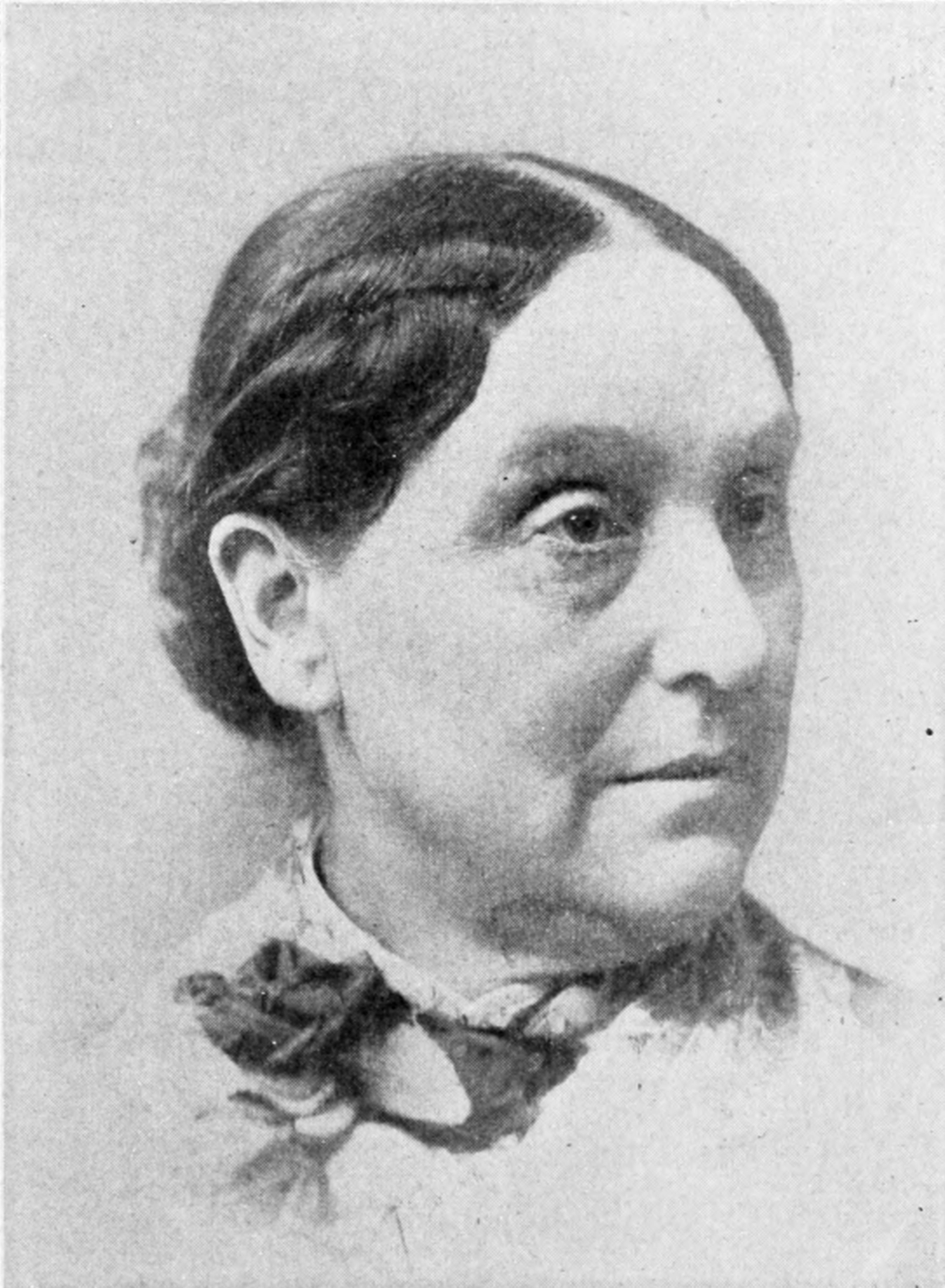
Abigail Scott Duniway, suffragist

Person	Lifespan	Notability	Born	Ref.
Florence Dagmar	1895–1986	Actress	Yes	
Arthur Dake	1910–2000	Chess Grandmaster	Yes	
Adam Aminé Daniel	1994–	Rapper, musician	Yes	
Britt Daniel	1971–	Musician, vocalist of Spoon	No	
George Dantzig	1914—2005	Mathematical scientist	Yes	
Darcelle XV	1930–2023	Drag performer	No	
Walt Dawson	1982–	Political lobbyist	Yes	
Valerie Day	1959–	Singer	Yes	
Burchard DeBusk	1877–1937	Academic	No	
Kelly Sue DeConnick	1970–	Comic writer	No	
David DeCoteau	1962–	Filmmaker	Yes	
Kate Deines	1982–	Professional soccer players	Yes	
Paul deLay	1952–2007	Blues harmonica player	Yes	
Albert H. Densmore	1946–	Businessman, state representative	Yes	
James DePriest	1936–2013	Director emeritus of orchestral studies at Juilliard School; director of Oregon Symphony	No	
Jennifer Devine	1968–	Olympic rower	Yes	
Maxine Dexter	1972–	Democratic U.S. representative, former Oregon state representative	No	
Yassine Diboun	1978–	Ultrarunner	No	
Matthew Dickman	1975–	Poet	Yes	
Richard Diebenkorn	1922–1993	Painter	Yes	
Aaron Director	1901–2004	Law professor at University of Chicago	No	
Beth Ditto	1981–	Singer-songwriter of Gossip	No	
Juan Dixon	1978–	Basketball player, Portland Trail Blazers	No	
Robyn Dixon	1979–	Reality TV personality	No	
Michael Doleac	1977–	NBA player	No	
Lee Dorsey	1924–1986	R&B singer	No	
Sarah Dougher	1967–	Singer-songwriter	No	
Linda Douglas	1928–2017	Actress, wife of Hank Greenberg	Yes	
saoirse dream		Musician	No	
Helen Savier DuMond	1872–1968	Painter, sculptor, and teacher; wife of Frank DuMond	Yes	
Abigail Scott Duniway	1834–1915	Suffragist	No	
Mike Dunleavy Jr.	1980–	NBA player	No	
Katherine Dunn	1945–2016	Author	No	

== E ==
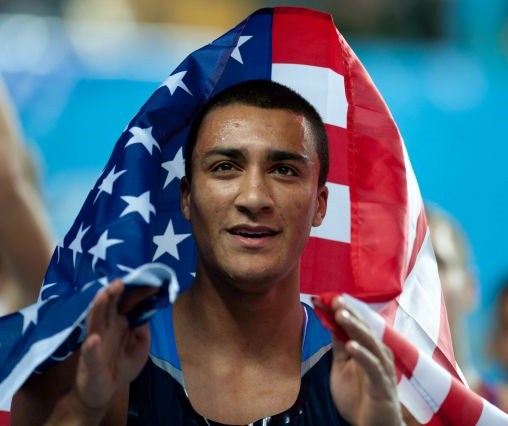
Ashton Eaton, decathlete

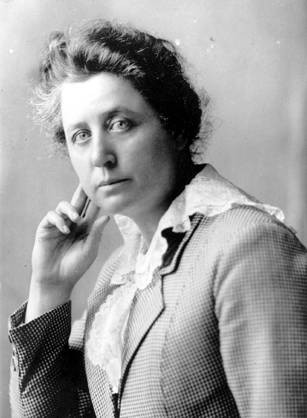
Marie Equi, physician

Person	Lifespan	Notability	Born	Ref.
Ron East	1943–	NFL player, coach	Yes	
Ashton Eaton	1988–	Decathlete	Yes	
Jonah Edelman	1970–	CEO of Stand for Children	No	
Dick Egan	1884–1947	Baseball player	Yes	
Jim Elkins	1901–1968	Crime boss	No	
Sam Elliott	1944–	Actor	No	
Carson Ellis	1975–	Illustrator	No	
Jack Ely	1943–2015	Musician of The Kingsmen	Yes	
Rick Emerson	1973–	Radio personality	No	
Douglas Engelbart	1925–2013	Inventor of computer mouse	Yes	
Marie Equi	1872–1952	Physician, anarchist	No	
Winfield Ervin, Jr.	1902–1985	Politician, mayor of Anchorage, Alaska	Yes	
Ellen Estes	1978–	Olympic silver medalist in water polo	Yes	
Christopher Evans	1847–1917	Train robber	No	
Sarah A. Evans	1854–1940	Suffragist	No	
Steven Evans	1991–	Soccer player	Yes	
John R. Everett	1918–1992	First chancellor of City University of New York; president of the New School for Social Research	Yes	
Neil Everett	1962–	Sportscaster	Yes	
Tom Everett	1948–	Actor	Yes	

== F ==
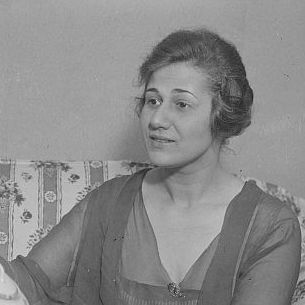
Amparito Farrar, soprano concert singer

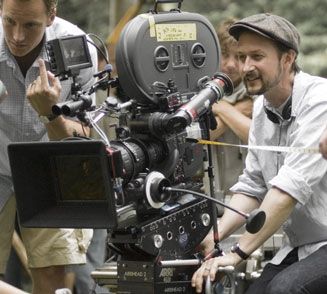
Todd Field, actor and filmmaker

Person	Lifespan	Notability	Born	Ref.
Henry Failing	1834–1898	Banker, politician	No	
Amparito Farrar	1893–1989	Soprano concert singer	Yes	
Jack Faust	1932–	Attorney, broadcaster	Yes	
David Feldberg		World champion disc golfer	Yes	
Shirley Adele Field	1923–1995	Legislator, judge	No	
Todd Field	1964–	Actor, filmmaker	No	
Brad Fitzpatrick	1980–	Creator of LiveJournal	No	
Harrell Fletcher	1967–	Artist	No	
Lisa Foiles	1986–	Actress	Yes	
Dick Fosbury	1947–2023	High jumper	Yes	
William Trufant Foster	1879–1950	Economist, first president of Reed College	No	
Matt Fraction	1975–	Comic writer	No	
Alma Francis	1890–1968	Actress, singer	Yes	
Abigail Keasey Frankel	–1931	Civic worker	No	
Boaz Frankel	1982–	Host of Clips & Quips	Yes	
Nell Franzen	1889–1973	Actress	Yes	
Amy Freeze	1974–	Meteorologist, WABC-TV New York	No	
Alex Frost	1987–	Actor	Yes	
C. Gordon Fullerton	1936–2013	Astronaut, member of Astronaut Hall of Fame	Yes	
Ron Funches	1983–	Standup comedian	No	
Elizabeth Furse	1936–2021	U.S. congresswoman	No	

== G ==
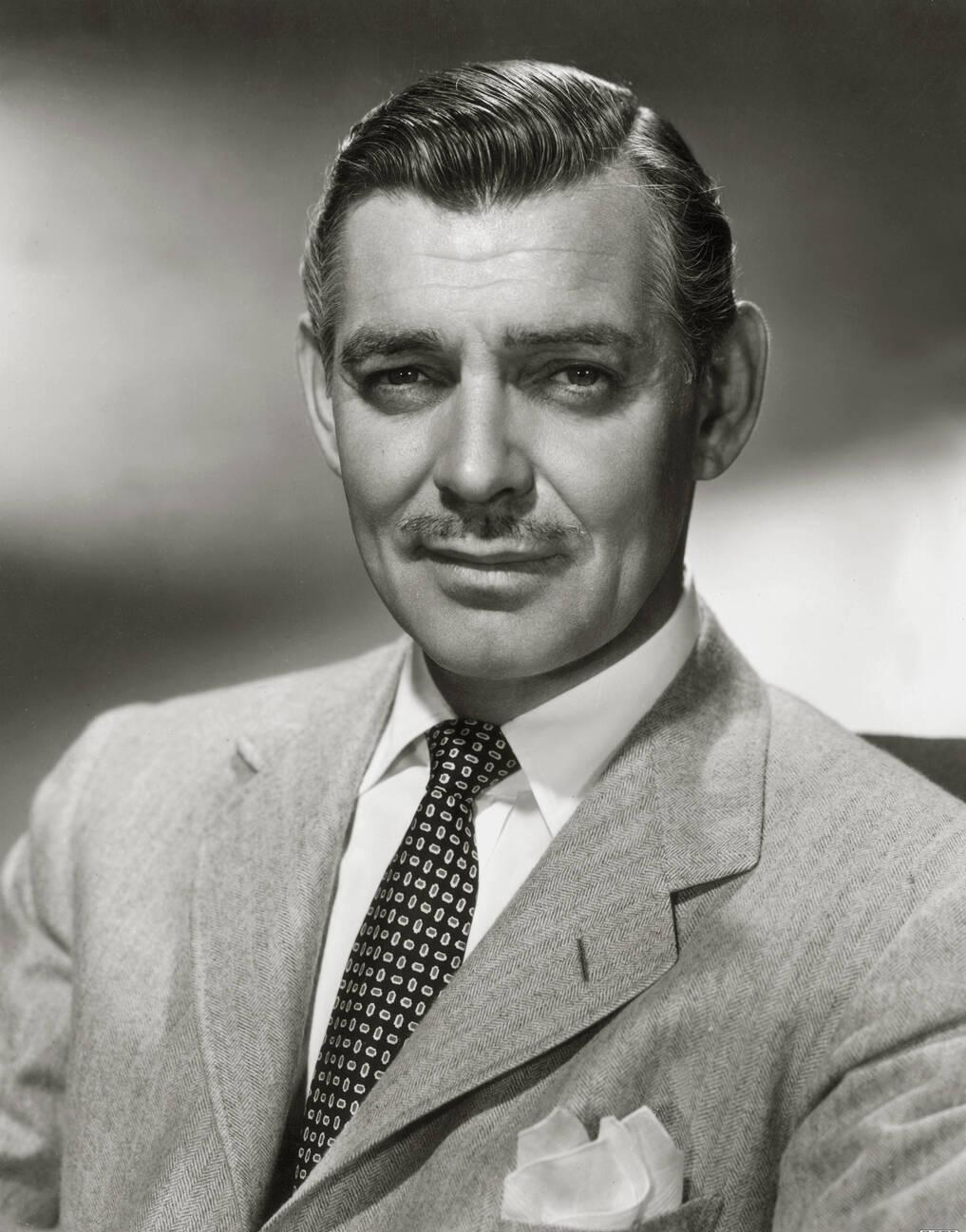
Clark Gable, actor

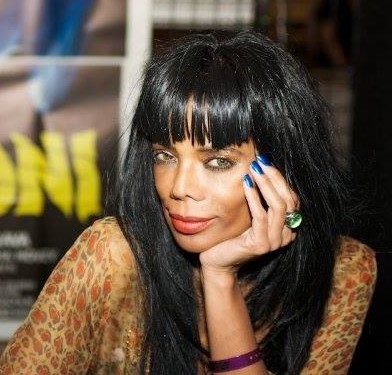
Geretta Geretta, actress

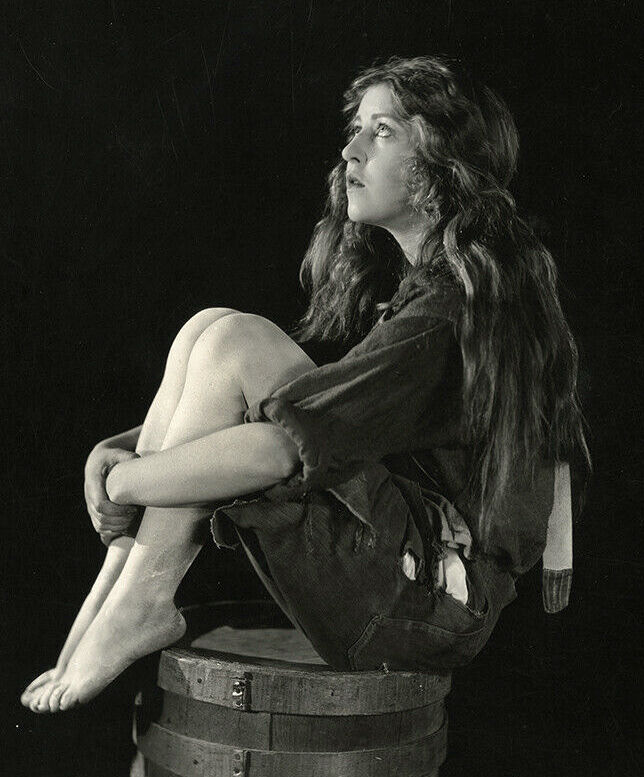
Gloria Grey, actress

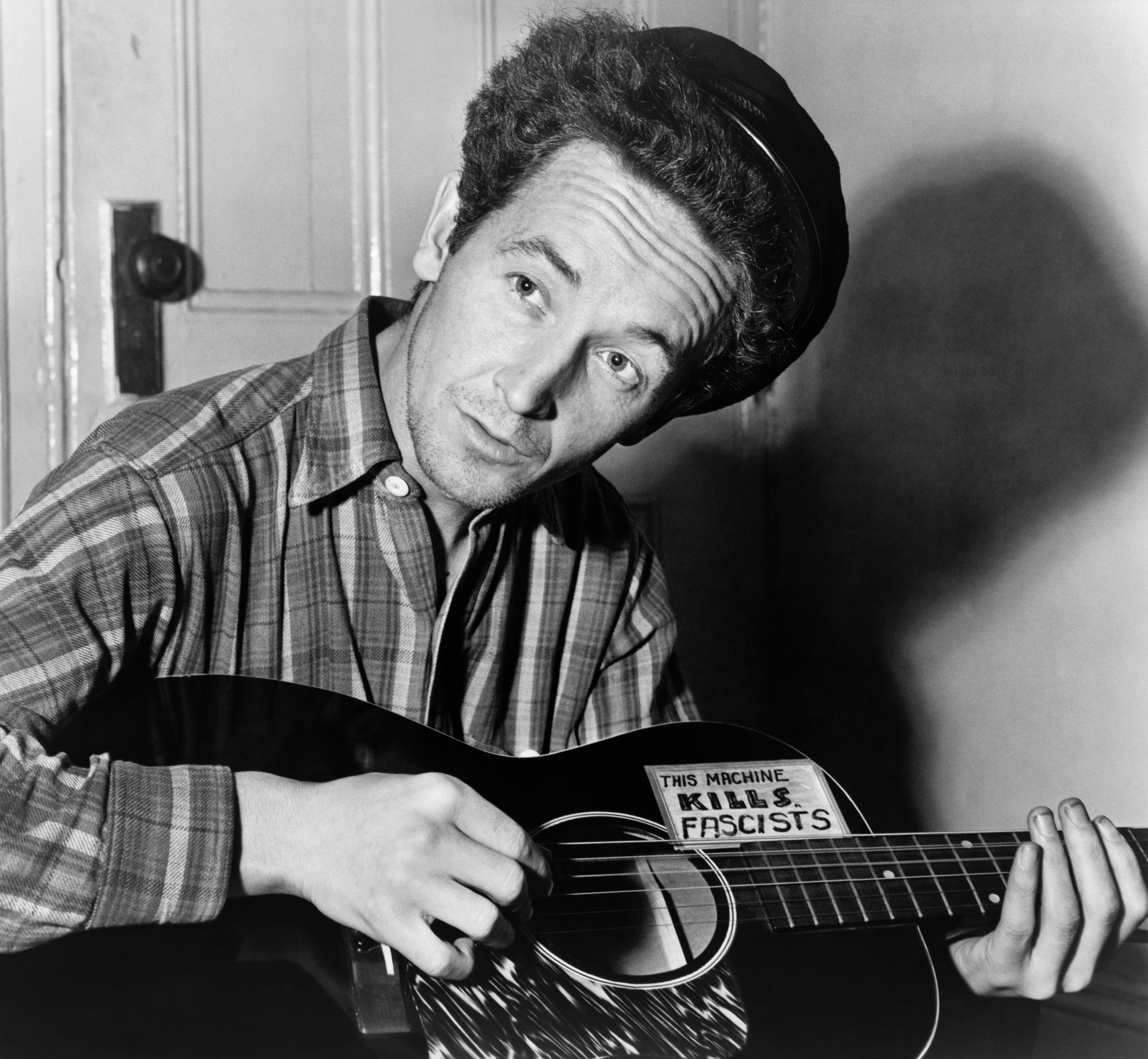
Woody Guthrie, singer-songwriter

Person	Lifespan	Notability	Born	Ref.
Clark Gable	1901–1960	Actor	No	
Rocky Gale	1988–	Major League Baseball player	Yes	
Ben Gardner	1990–	NFL player	Yes	
Paul Gaustad	1982–	National Hockey League player	No	
Geretta Geretta	1958–	Actress	Yes	
Florence Holmes Gerke	1896–1964	Landscape architect	Yes	
Robert L. Ghormley	1883–1958	Naval officer	Yes	
Paul Gilbert	1966–	Musician	No	
Cole Gillespie	1984–	Baseball player	Yes	
Gary Gilmore	1940–1977	First person executed in U.S. after reinstatement of capital punishment	No	
Madeline Gleason	1903–1979	Poet, dramatist	No	
Russell Gleason	1908–1945	Actor	Yes	
Harry Glickman	1924-2020	Founder of the Portland Trail Blazers	Yes	
Rodney Glisan	1827–1890	U.S. Army surgeon	No	
Molly Gloss	1944–	Author	Yes	
Karl Glusman	1988–	Actor	No	
Jacob Golden	1970s–	Musician	No	
Hilda Goldblatt Gorenstein	1905–1988	Artist	No	
Brandon Gonzáles	1984–	Professional boxer	Yes	
Louis S. Goodman	1906–2000	Pharmacologist, pioneer of chemotherapy	Yes	
Aaron Goodwin	1976–	Photographer, cameraman of Ghost Adventures	Yes	
Avel Gordly	1947–	First African-American woman elected to Oregon State Senate	Yes	
Joe Gordon	1915–1978	Baseball player	No	
Kara Goucher	1978–	Olympic long-distance runner	No	
Jessie Coles Grayson	1886–1953	Actress	No	
Gary Graver	1938–2006	Cinematographer	Yes	
Betty Evans Grayson	(1925–1979)	Softball pitcher	Yes	
A.C. Green	1963–	Retired NBA champion	Yes	
Edith Green	1910–1987	Politician	No	
Harrison Greene	1884–1945	Actor	Yes	
Jim Grelle	1936–2020	Olympic middle-distance runner	Yes	
Gloria Grey	1909–1947	Actress	Yes	
Matt Groening	1954–	Animator, creator of The Simpsons and Futurama	Yes	
Woody Guthrie	1912–1955	Folk singer-songwriter	No	

== H ==
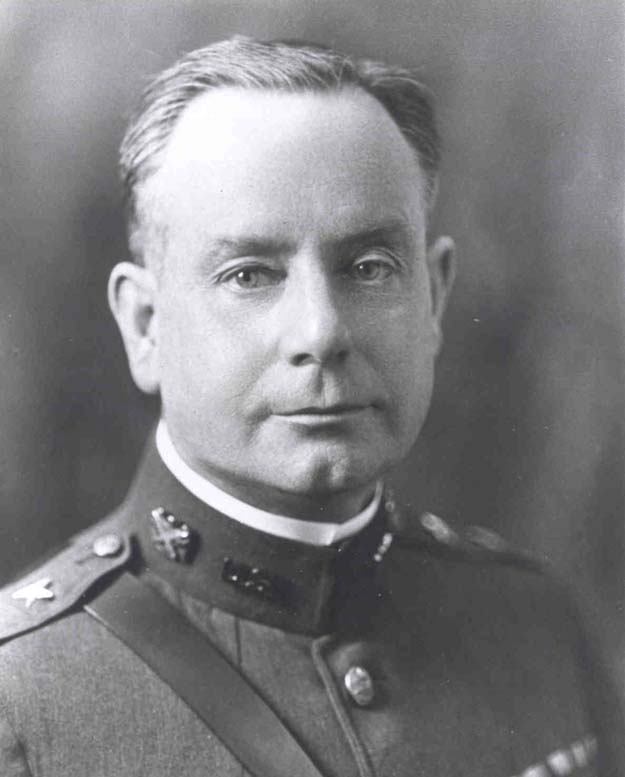
Creed C. Hammond, U.S. Army major general

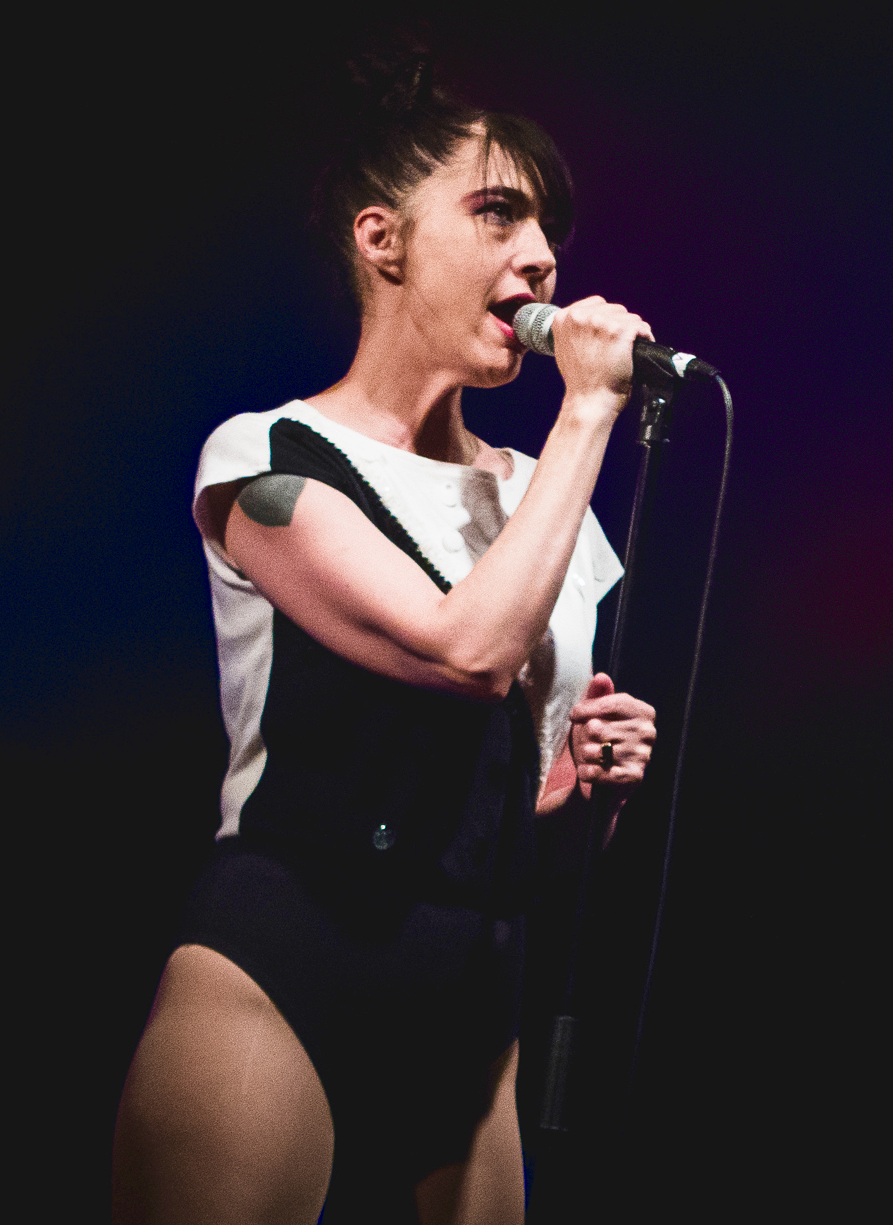
Kathleen Hanna, musician and feminist

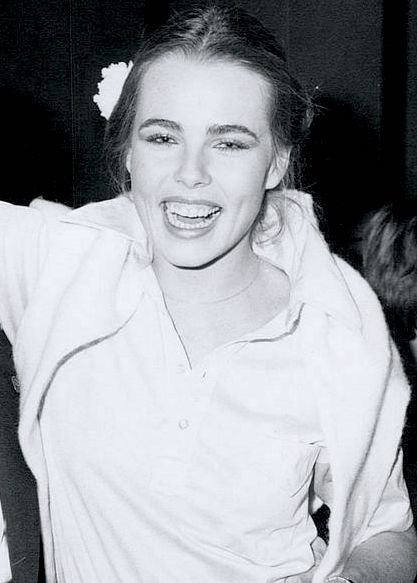
Margaux Hemingway, model and actress

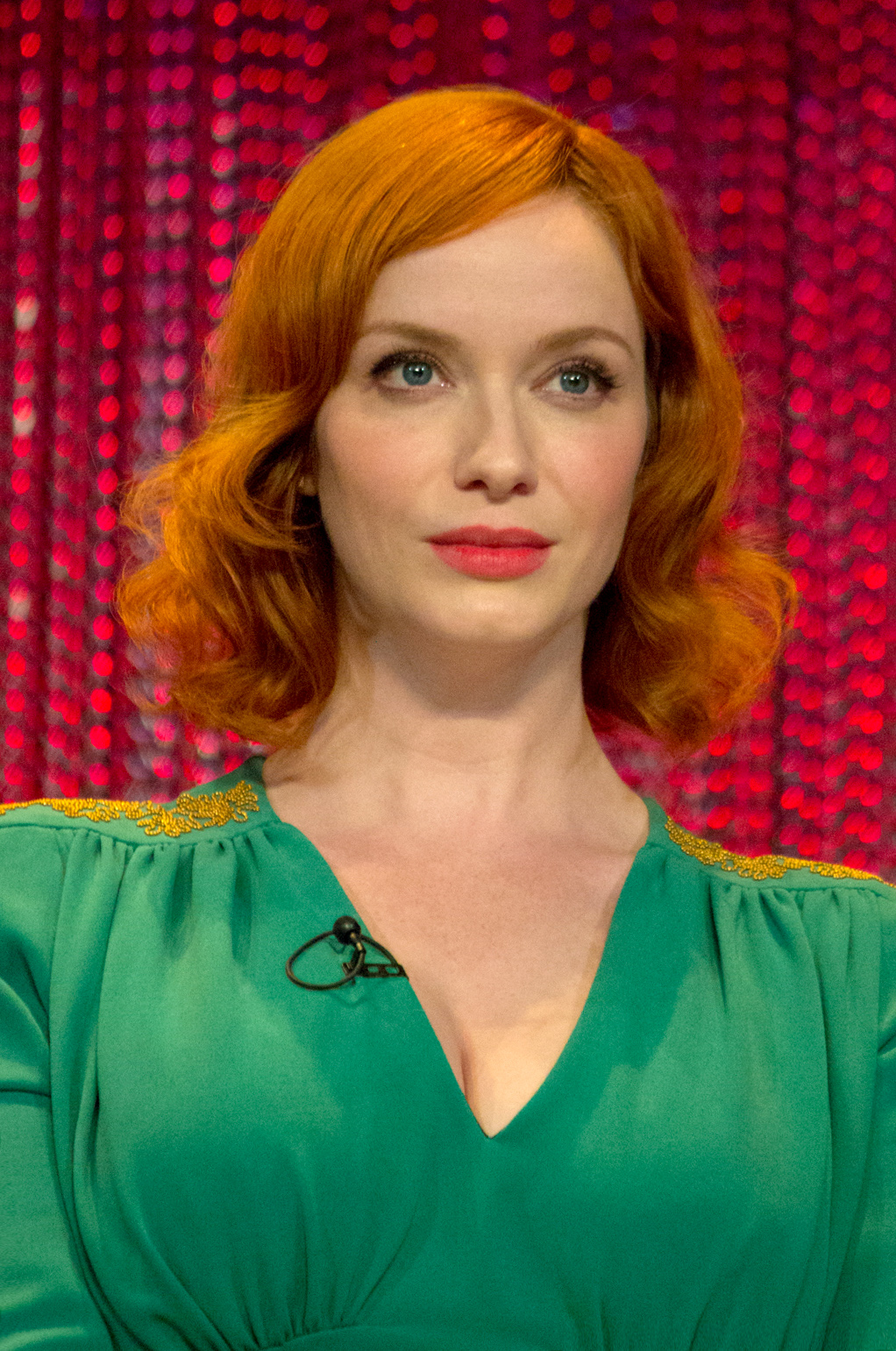
Christina Hendricks, actress

Person	Lifespan	Notability	Born	Ref.
Kevin Hagen	1928–2005	Actor	No	
Ancer L. Haggerty	1944–	U.S. federal judge	Yes	
Marian Hailey-Moss	1941–	Actress	Yes	
Swede Halbrook	1933–1988	NBA player	Yes	
Sally Haley	1908–2007	Painter	No	
Creed C. Hammond	1874–1940	Major general and chief of the National Guard Bureau	No	
Max Handelman	1973–	Sportswriter, film producer	Yes	
Kathleen Hanna	1968–	Singer-songwriter (Bikini Kill, Le Tigre)	Yes	
Julia Butler Hansen	1907–1988	Politician	Yes	
Tonya Harding	1970–	U.S. national champion and Olympic figure skater	Yes	
Katie Harman	1980–	Miss America 2002	Yes	
Joey Harrington	1978–	NFL quarterback	Yes	
Nate Harris	1983–	NFL linebacker	No	
Bret Harrison	1982–	Actor	Yes	
Lou Harrison	1917–2003	Composer	Yes	
Michael Allen Harrison		Musician	Yes	
Larry Harvey	1948–2018	Artist, founder of Burning Man	No	
Lew Harvey	1887–1953	Actor	No	
Byron Haskin	1899–1984	Filmmaker	Yes	
F. W. Hastings	1848–1935	Politician	Yes	
Steve Havelka		Creator of Pokey the Penguin	Yes	
James C. Hawthorne	1819–1881	Physician, co-founder of Oregon Hospital for the Insane	No	
Ernest Haycox	1899–1950	Writer	Yes	
Carey Hayes	1961–	Screenwriter	Yes	
Chad Hayes	1961–	Screenwriter	Yes	
Todd Haynes	1961–	Filmmaker	No	
Dana Heitman	1966–	Musician	Yes	
Susan Helms	1958–	Astronaut	No	
Margaux Hemingway	1954–1996	Model, actress; granddaughter of Ernest Hemingway	Yes	
Christina Hendricks	1975–	Actress	No	
Frank Herbert	1920–1986	Writer, journalist	No	
Joe Hill	1879–1915	Labor activist	No	
Jan Hoag	1948–	Actress	Yes	
Judi Hofer	1940–2013	Businessperson	Yes	
Portland Hoffa	1905–1990	Radio host, actress	Yes	
Stewart Holbrook	1893–1964	Author, artist	No	
Ben Holladay	1819–1897	Transportation mogul	No	
Matt Hollywood	1973–	Musician	No	
Frederick Holman	1852–1927	Lawyer	No	
Peter Holmström		Musician	Yes	
Kyron Horman	2002–	Missing person	Yes	
Michael Hornburg	1960–	Author	No	
Hal E. Hoss	1892–1934	Journalist	Yes	
Bill Hudson	1949–	Musician, father of Oliver and Kate Hudson	Yes	
Brett Hudson	1953–	Musician, television producer	Yes	
Mark Hudson	1951–	Musician, record producer	Yes	
Charlie Huhn	1951–	Musician	Yes	
Cooper Hummel	1994–	Major League Baseball player	Yes	
William Hurt	1950–2022	Actor	No	

== I ==
Person	Lifespan	Notability	Born	Ref.
Illmaculate	1986–	Hip hop musician	Yes	
ILoveMakonnen	1989–	Hip hop musician	No	
Dan Ireland	1949–2016	Filmmaker	Yes	
Mary Frances Isom	1865–1920	Librarian, founder of Oregon Library Association	No	

== J ==
Person	Lifespan	Notability	Born	Ref.
Peter Jacobsen	1954–	Pro-golfer	Yes	
Clayton Jacobson II	1933–2022	Creator of jet ski	Yes	
Evan Jager	1989–	Distance runner	No	
Jeff Jahn	1970–	Art critic, historian, and curator	No	
Cathy Jamison	1950–	Olympic swimmer	Yes	
Gary Jarman	1980–	Musician	No	
Maxine Jennings	1909–1991	Actress	Yes	
Ethel Jewett	1877–1944	Actress	Yes	
Steve Jobs	1955–2011	Creator, founder of Apple	No	
Chris Johanson	1968–	Painter	No	
Syl Johnson	1900–1985	Major League Baseball player	Yes	
Fred Jones	1979–	NBA All-Star Slam Dunk Champion	Yes	
Scott Jones	1966–	NFL offensive guard	Yes	
Terrence Jones	1992–	NBA player	Yes	
Greg Joy	1956–	High jumper	Yes	
Miranda July	1974–	Filmmaker, performance artist	No	

== K ==
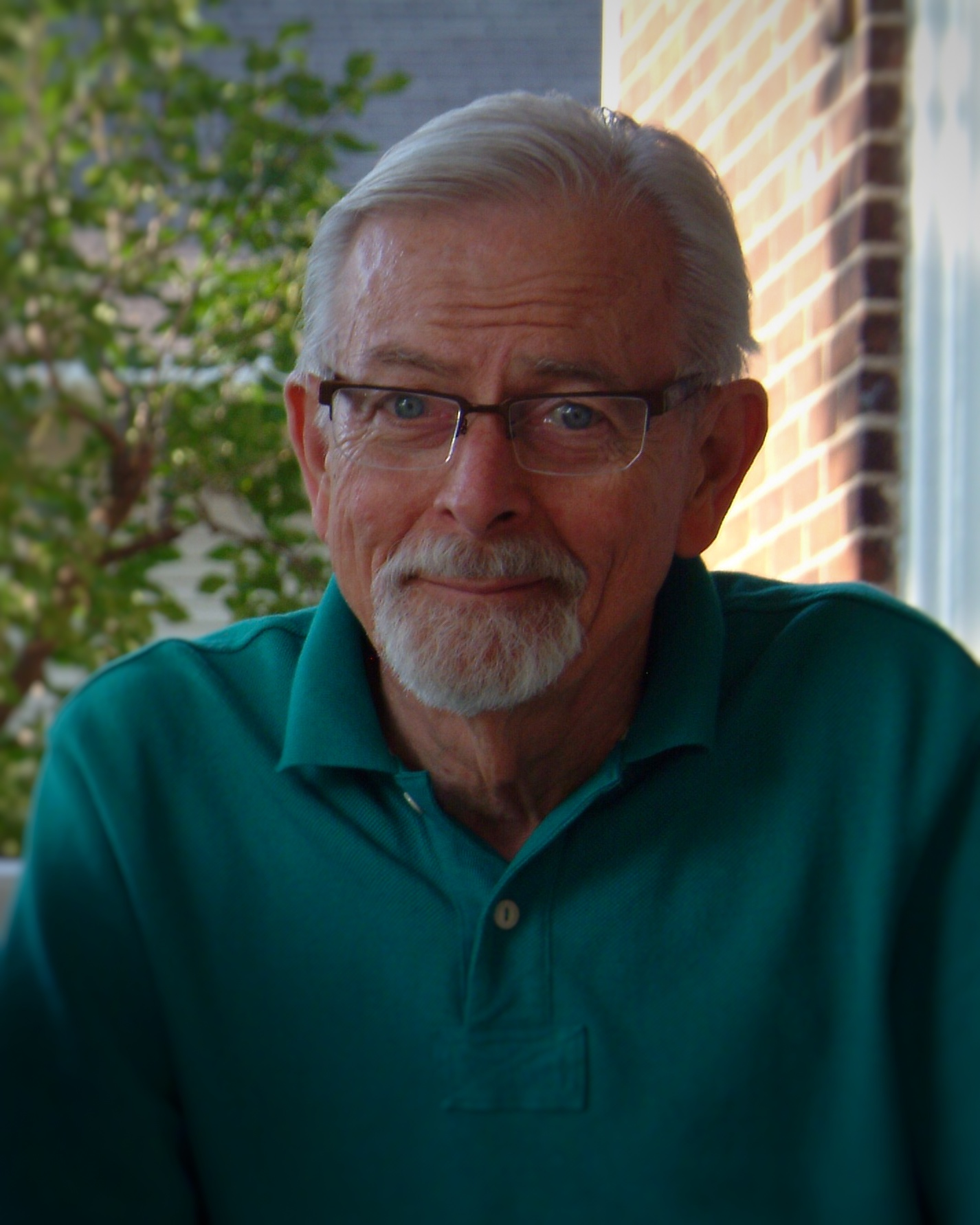
A. Thomas Kraabel, classics and Jewish history scholar

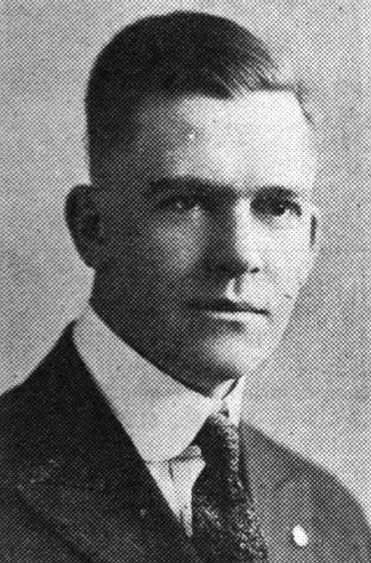
Franklin F. Korell, U.S. congressman

Person	Lifespan	Notability	Born	Ref.
Louis Kaufman	1905–1944	Violinist	Yes	
Daniel Kaven	1977–	Architect, artist	No	
Gabe Kennedy	1990–	Chef, entrepreneur	Yes	
Lisa Kennedy	1972–	Political commentator	No	
Robert E. Kennedy	1914–2010	Professor, president of California Polytechnic State University	Yes	
Shell Kepler	1958–2008	Actress	No	
Cecil Kern	1883–1928	Actress	Yes	
Maude Kerns	1876–1965	Avant-garde artist	Yes	
Albertina Kerr	1890–1911	Heiress to Kerr Glass Company	Yes	
Donald M. Kerr	1946–2015	Wildlife biologist, conservationist	Yes	
William Jasper Kerr	1863–1947	Academic, first chancellor of Oregon University System	No	
Nitin Khanna	1975–	Founder and CEO of MergerTech	No	
Brian Kidd	1983–	Unicyclist known as the Unipiper	No	
James Kilgore	1947–	Activist, author	Yes	
Wright King	1923–2018	Actor	No	
Zach King	1990–	YouTube personality	Yes	
Phil Knight	1938–	Co-founder of Nike, Inc.	Yes	
William W. Knight	1909–1981	Publisher	No	
Terence Knox	1946–	Actor	Yes	
Franklin F. Korell	1889–1965	Politician	Yes	
A. Thomas Kraabel	1934–2016	Classics and Jewish history scholar	Yes	
LaVerne Krause	1924–1987	Printmaker	Yes	
Jane Kurtz	1952–	Author	Yes	
Taya Kyle	1974–	Author, activist; wife of Chris Kyle	Yes	

== L ==
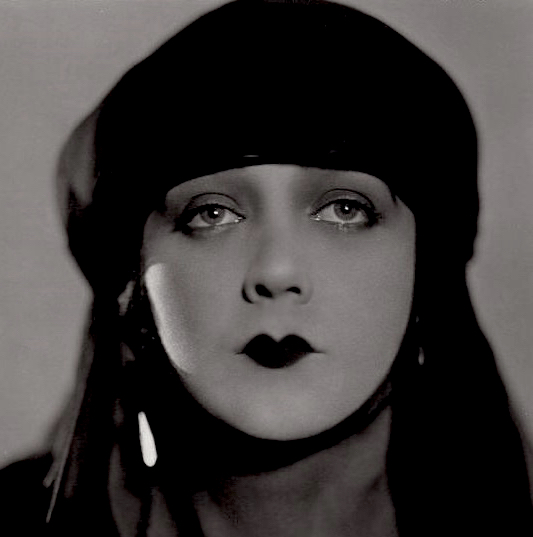
Barbara La Marr, actress

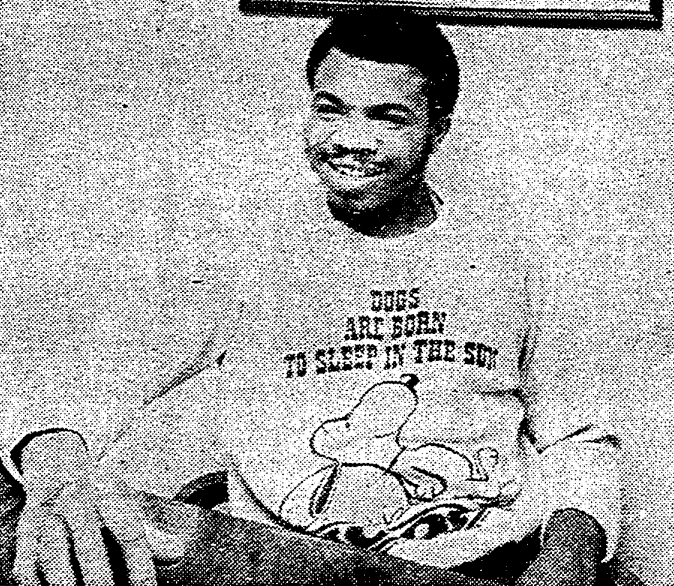
Ray Lampkin, boxer

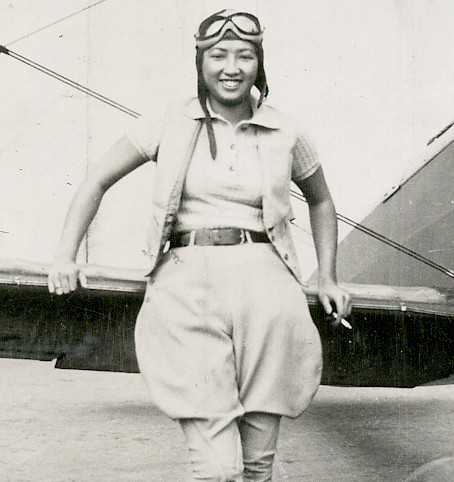
Hazel Ying Lee, pilot

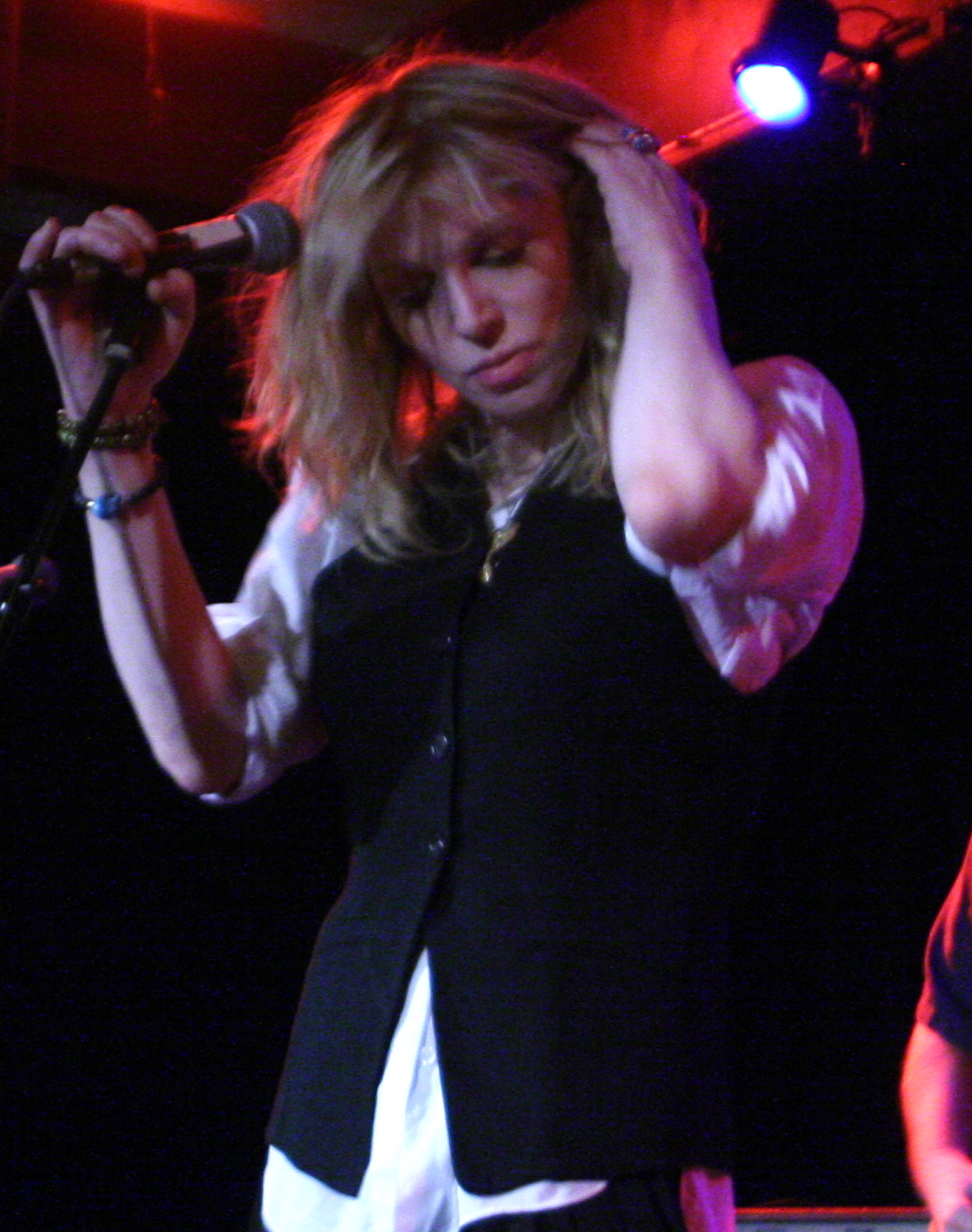
Courtney Love, musician and actress

Person	Lifespan	Notability	Born	Ref.
Barbara La Marr	1896–1926	Actress	No	
William S. Ladd	1826–1893	Businessman, industrialist	No	
Mary Catherine Lamb	1949–2009	Textile artist	No	
Ray Lampkin	1948–	Retired professional boxer	Yes	
Ben Hur Lampman	1896–1954	Editor, Oregon poet laureate	Yes	
Cowboy Lang	1950–2007	Midget professional wrestler	No	
k.d. lang	1961–	Singer-songwriter	No	
Harry Lane	1855–1917	Politician, physician	No	
Storm Large	1969–	Musician	No	
Earle Larrimore	1899–1947	Actor	Yes	
Lars Larson	1959–	Conservative talk radio host	No	
Matt Lattanzi	1959–	Actor; ex-husband of Olivia Newton-John	Yes	
Thomas Lauderdale	1970–	Musician (Pink Martini)	No	
Preacher Lawson	1991–	Comedian	Yes	
Edgar M. Lazarus	1868–1939	Architect	No	
Ursula K. Le Guin	1929–2018	Author	No	
Agnes Brand Leahy	1893–1943	Screenwriter	Yes	
Clara Elizabeth Chan Lee	1886–1993	First Chinese American woman registered to vote	Yes	
Hazel Ying Lee	1912–1944	First Chinese-American female military pilot	Yes	
Marc Alan Lee	1978–2006	United States Navy SEAL	Yes	
Barbara Lekberg	1925–2018	Artist, sculptor	Yes	
Ion Lewis	1853–1923	Architect	No	
Jack Lewis	1964–	Author	Yes	
Norman Leyden	1917–2014	Conductor, clarinetist	No	
Carl L. Linde	1864–1945	German American architect	No	
Ben Linder	1959–1987	Engineer	No	
Brian Lindstrom	1961–	Documentarian	Yes	
Albert Littlefield		First professional abortion provider in Portland	No	
Fred Lockley	1871–1958	Journalist	No	
Jeanette Loff	1906–1942	Actress	No	
Mickey Lolich	1940–	Major League Baseball pitcher	Yes	
Neil Lomax	1959–	Football player	Yes	
Ashly Lorenzana	1987-	Sex worker, author and freelance writer	Yes	
A. M. Loryea	1839–1893	Physician, co-founder of Oregon Hospital for the Insane	No	
Courtney Love	1964–	Actress, musician (Hole)	No	
George A. Lovejoy	1931–2015	New Hampshire State Senator, businessman	Yes	
Richard A. Lovett	1953–	Author	No	
Horace Sumner Lyman	1855–1904	Journalist, historian	No	
Logan Lynn	1979–	Musician, writer, activist	No	

== M ==
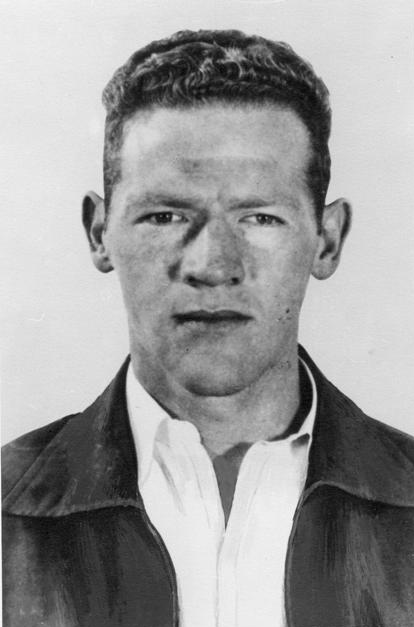
Richard Laurence Marquette, serial killer

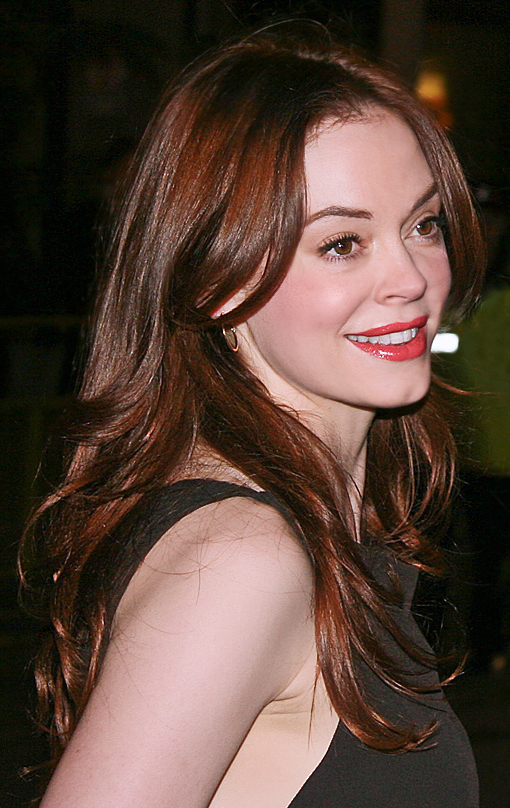
Rose McGowan, actress, director

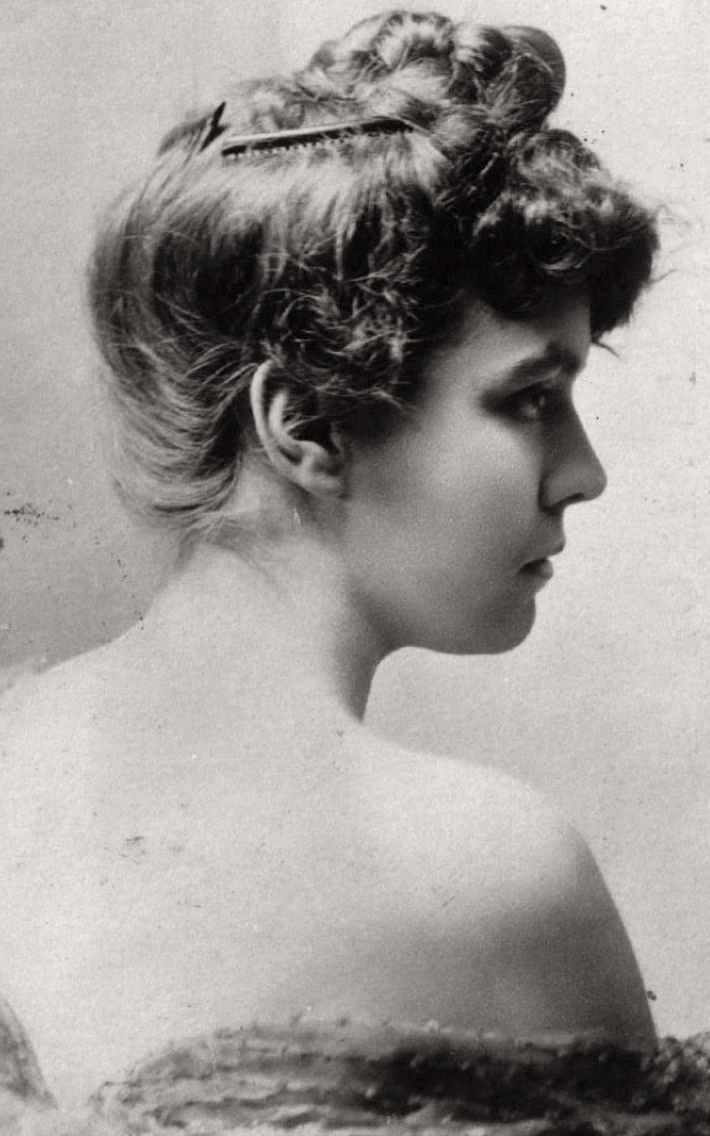
Mayo Methot, actress

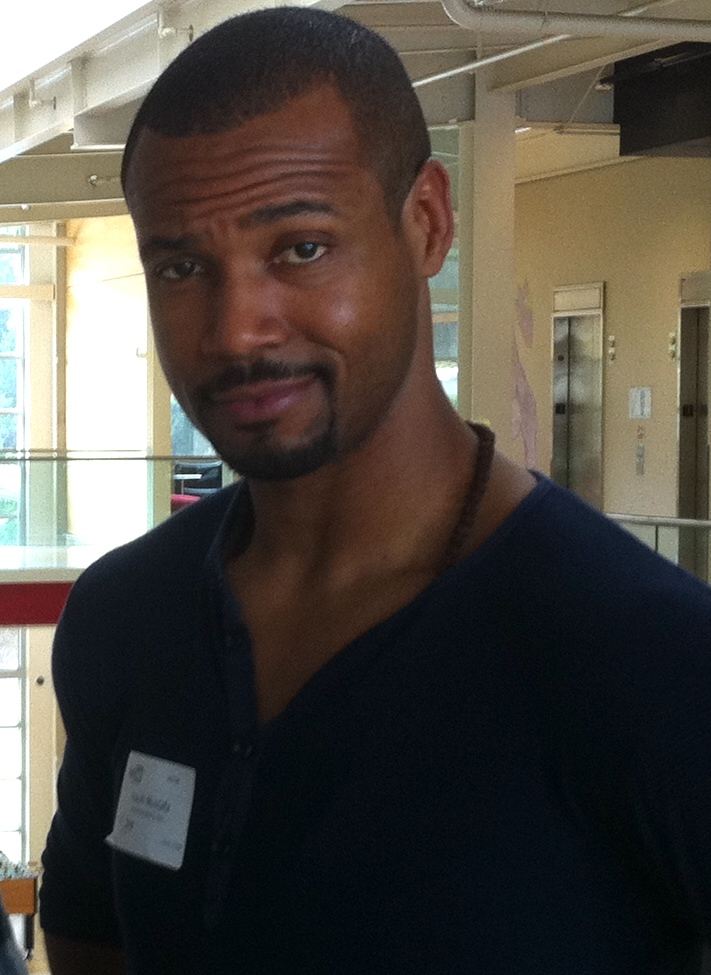
Isaiah Mustafa, actor and athlete

Person	Lifespan	Notability	Born	Ref.
Ballard MacDonald	1882–1935	Songwriter and lyricist	Yes	
Harry Mack	1990–	Rapper	No	
Shannon MacMillan	1974–	U.S. soccer player	No	
Vivek Maddala	1973–	Composer, musician, producer	No	
L. K. Madigan	1963–2010	Writer of young adult fiction	Yes	
Holly Madison	1979–	Playboy Playmate, actress	No	
Sharon Maeda	1945–	Activist	No	
Neda Maghbouleh		Professor, sociologist, writer	No	
Cleo Maletis	1925–2009	Mrs. America 1957	No	
Stephen Malkmus	1966–	Musician (Pavement)	No	
Paul Malvern	1902–1993	Stuntman, producer	Yes	
Robert Mann	1920–2018	Violinist, founder of Juilliard String Quartet	Yes	
Thomas Mann	1991–	Actor	Yes	
Steve March	1946-	Politician and businessman	No	
Phillip Margolin	1944–	Writer, lawyer	Yes	
Richard Marquette	1934–	Serial killer	Yes	
Chan Marshall	1972–	Musician (Cat Power)	No	
Leanne Marshall	1980–	Winner of Project Runway, season 5	No	
Vivian Marshall	1888–1969	Actress, stuntwoman	No	
Emily Winfield Martin		Artist, children's author	Yes	
Robert Marx	1956–	Fencer	Yes	
Blair Mastbaum	1975–	Author	No	
Ana Matronic	1974–	Singer	Yes	
Les McClaine	1977–	Comic artist	No	
S. J. McCormick	1828–1891	Publisher	No	
Rose McGowan	1973–	Actress, director	No	
Douglas McKay	1893–1959	Politician	Yes	
Wanda McKay	1915–1996	Actress	Yes	
Dallas McKennon	1919–2009	Voice actor	No	
Brian McMenamin	1957–	Brewpub owner, businessman	Yes	
Mike McMenamin		Brewpub owner, businessman	Yes	
Carlton Mellick III	1977–	Author	No	
Colin Meloy	1974–	Musician (The Decemberists)	No	
James Mercer	1970–	Musician (The Shins)	No	
Judi Meredith	1936–2014	Actress, figure skater	Yes	
Natalie Mering	1988–	Musician (Weyes Blood)	No	
Nancy Merki	1926–2014	Olympic swimmer	Yes	
Jeff Merkley	1956–	U.S. senator	No	
Mayo Methot	1904–1951	Actress	No	
Noah Mickens		Ringmaster of Wanderlust Circus	Yes	
Tiffeny Milbrett	1972–	Soccer player, Olympic and World Cup champion	Yes	
Colleen Miller	1932–	Actress	No	
Donald Miller	1971–	Author	No	
Karen Minnis	1954–	Politician	Yes	
Bob Mionske	1962–	Attorney, Olympic bicycle racer	No	
Mirah	1974–	Musician	No	
Rhea Mitchell	1890–1957	Actress	Yes	
Erika Moen	1983–	Comic artist	No	
Anne Shannon Monroe	1873–1942	Writer	No	
Jinkx Monsoon	1987–	Drag queen, singer, actor	Yes	
Lisa Montgomery	1972–	MTV VJ	No	
Al Moore	1908–1991	Football player	Yes	
Glen Moore	1941–	Jazz bassist	Yes	
Jason Moore		Wikipedia editor and organizer	No	
Joel David Moore	1977–	Actor, director	Yes	
Hilda Grossman Morris	1911–1991	Artist	No	
Sienna Morris	1983–	Artist	No	
Lee Morse	1897–1954	Singer-songwriter, actress	No	
Cris Moss		Artist, curator	No	
George Mullin	1892–1963	World War I veteran, Victoria Cross winner	Yes	
Ona Munson	1903–1955	Actress	Yes	
Francis J. Murnane	1914–1968	Longshore worker, preservationist	No	
Dale Murphy	1956–	Major League Baseball player	Yes	
Brent Musburger	1939–	ESPN and ABC newscaster	Yes	
Isaiah Mustafa	1974–	Actor, athlete	Yes	
Danny Mwanga	1991–	Soccer player	No	

== N ==
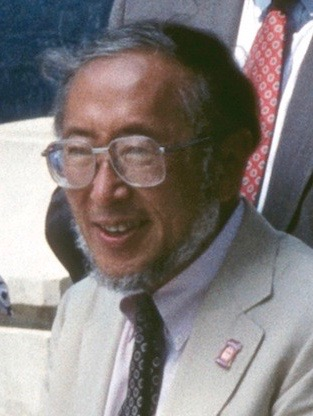
Bill Naito, businessman

Person	Lifespan	Notability	Born	Ref.
Legedu Naanee	1983–	NFL player	Yes	
Rose Naftalin	1898–1998	Restaurateur	No	
Bill Naito	1925–1996	Businessman	Yes	
Dika Newlin	1923–2006	Composer, musician	Yes	
Rob Neyer	1966–	Sportswriter, author	No	
Scout Niblett	1973–	Musician	No	
Stella Nickell	1943–	Convicted criminal	No	
Jen and Kyndi Niquette	1988–	Singers (Jen and Kat), lifestyle models	No	

== O ==
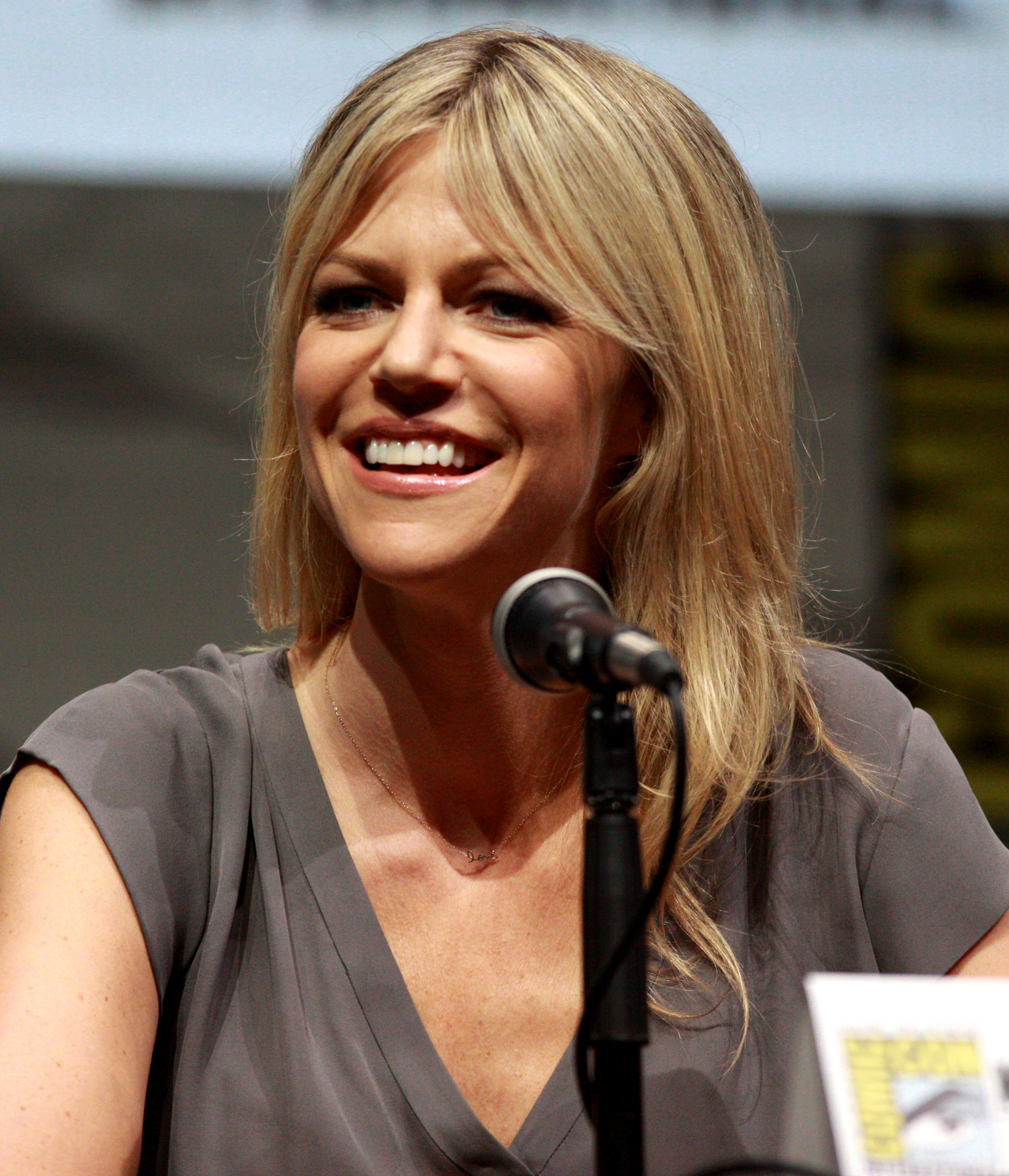
Kaitlin Olson, actress

Person	Lifespan	Notability	Born	Ref.
Colin O'Brady	1985–	Endurance athlete	No	
Dan O'Brien	1966–	Olympic gold medalist	Yes	
Bill O'Reilly	1949–	Political commentator, former news anchor	No	
Broderick O'Farrell	1882–1955	Actor	Yes	
Kevin O'Rourke	1956–	Actor	Yes	
Bill Oakley	1966–	Writer	No	
Jack Ohman	1960–	Editorial cartoonist of The Oregonian	No	
Steve Olin	1965–1993	Major League Baseball pitcher	Yes	
George Olsen	1893–1971	Bandleader	Yes	
Kaitlin Olson	1975–	Actress, comedian	Yes	
William Olvis	1958–2014	Composer	Yes	
Mark Orton		Film score composer	No	
William Overton		Co-founder of Portland	Yes	

== P ==
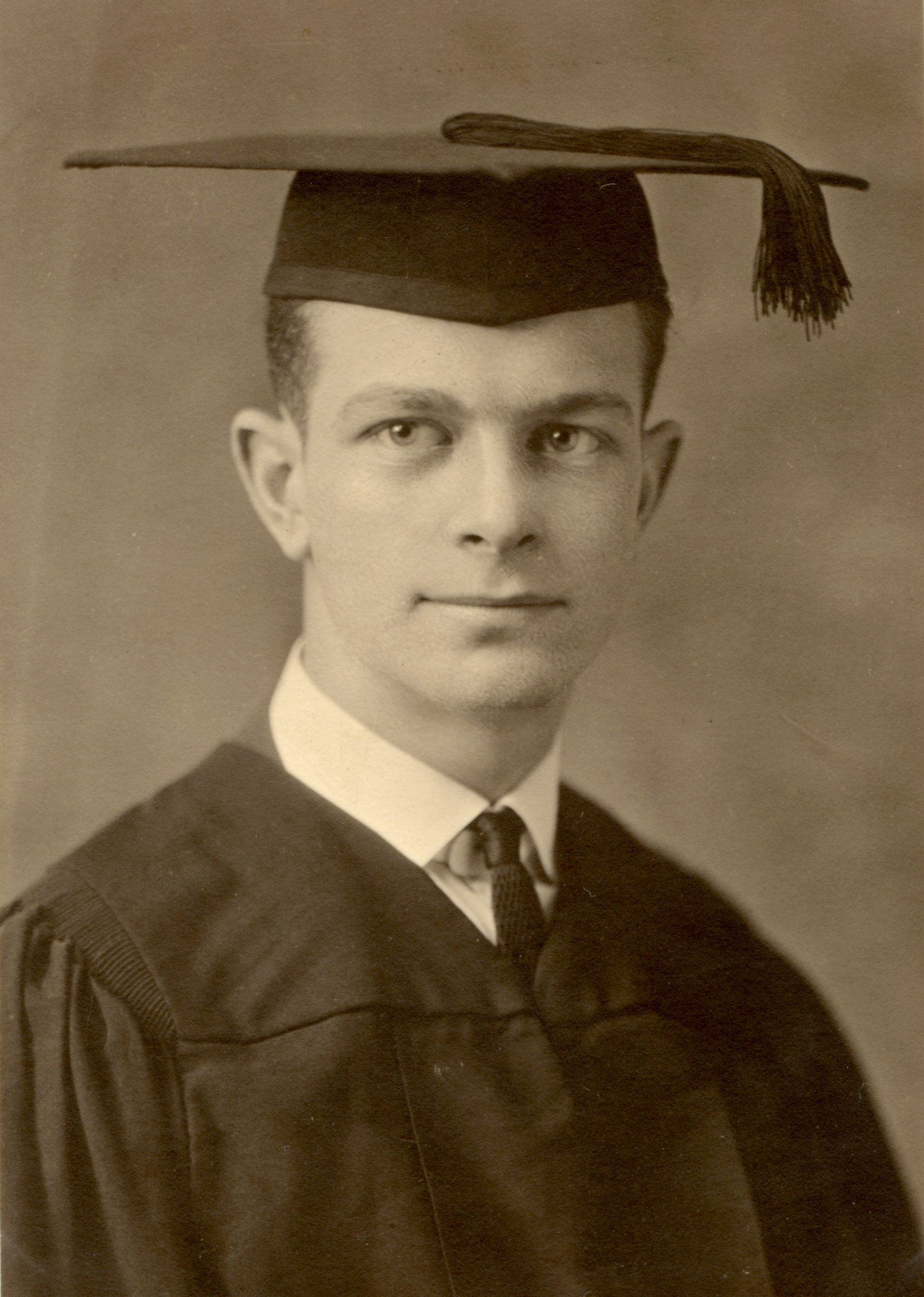
Linus Pauling, chemist and peace activist

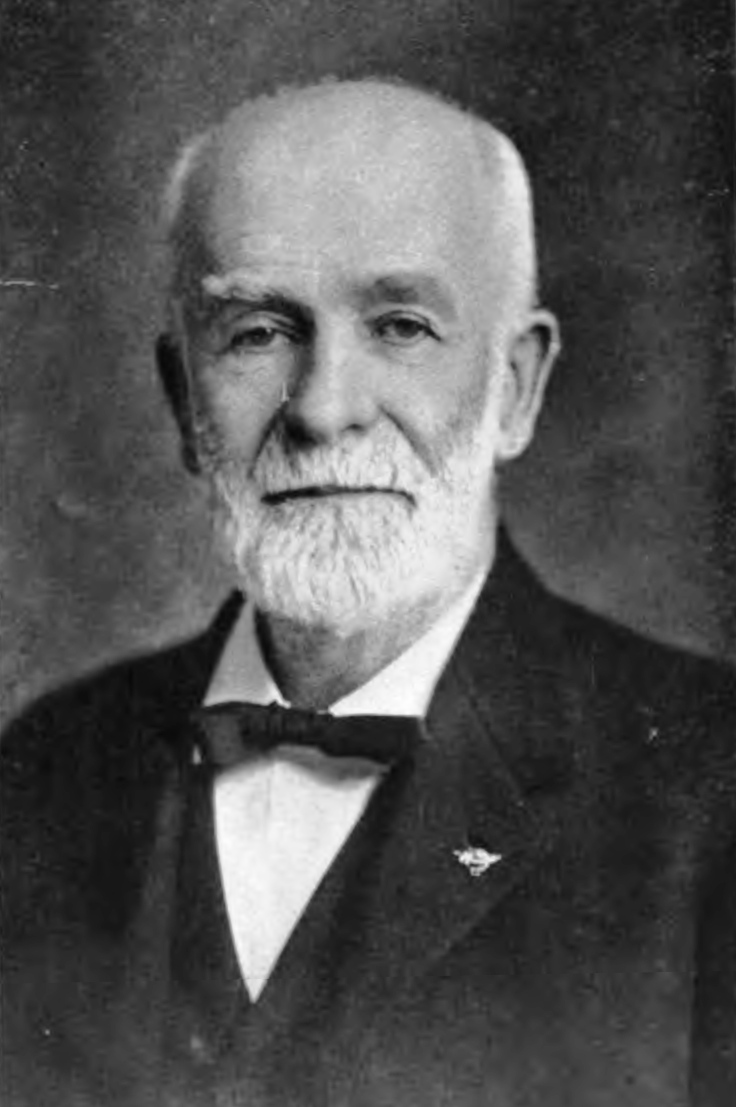
Orlando Plummer, physician and politician

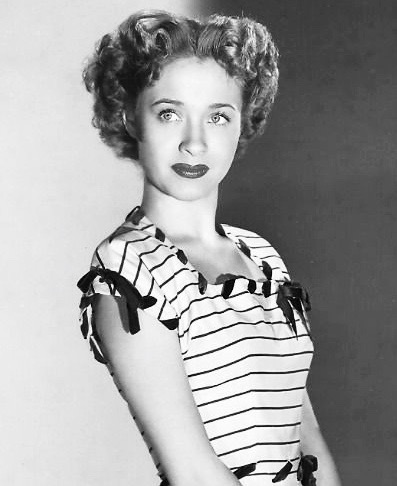
Jane Powell, actress and singer

Person	Lifespan	Notability	Born	Ref.
Keith Packard	1963–	Software developer	No	
Bettie Page	1923–2008	Pin-up model	No	
Chuck Palahniuk	1962–	Author	No	
Robert B. Pamplin	1911–2009	Businessman	No	
Jiggs Parrott	1871–1891	Major League Baseball infielder	Yes	
Tom Parrott	1868–1932	Major League Baseball pitcher	Yes	
Dennis Patera	1945–	NFL player	Yes	
Ken Patera	1942–	Olympic weightlifter	Yes	
Virginia Patton	1925–2022	Actress, businesswoman	No	
Linus Pauling	1901–1994	Double Nobel Prize-winning chemist	Yes	
George Anson Pease	1830–1919	Steamboat captain	No	
Lute Pease	1869–1963	Pulitzer Prize-winning cartoonist	No	
Jack Pennick	1895–1964	Actor	Yes	
Edward J. Perkins	1928–2020	Diplomat	No	
Johnny Pesky	1919–2012	Major League Baseball player (Boston Red Sox)	Yes	
Susan Peters	1921–1952	Actress	No	
Buddy Peterson	1925–2007	Baseball player	Yes	
Tom Peterson	1930–2016	Television personality	No	
Samuel B. Pettengill	1886–1974	Politician	Yes	
James Phelan	1892–1974	Football player, coach	No	
Henry F. Phillips	1890–1958	Inventor of the Phillips-head screw	Yes	
Hollie Pihl	1928–2018	Judge	Yes	
Mitch Pileggi	1952–	Actor	Yes	
Roddy Piper	1954–2015	Wrestler	No	
Joe Plummer		Rock drummer, percussionist	No	
Orlando Plummer	1836–1913	Physician, politician	No	
Bill Plympton	1946–	Animator, illustrator	Yes	
Justine W. Polier	1903–1987	First female judge in New York	Yes	
Daniel A. Poling	1884–1968	Clergyman	Yes	
Erika Polmar		Entrepreneur and activist	No	
Paul Popham	1941–1987	War veteran, gay rights activist	No	
Tom Potter	1940–	Former police chief and mayor of Portland	No	
Gap Powell	1898–1989	Professional football player	Yes	
Jane Powell	1929–2021	Actress, singer	Yes	
Jule Power	1880–1932	Actress	Yes	
Maudie Prickett	1914–1976	Actress	Yes	

== Q ==
Person	Lifespan	Notability	Born	Ref.
Philip Quinton	1999–	Soccer player	Yes	

== R ==
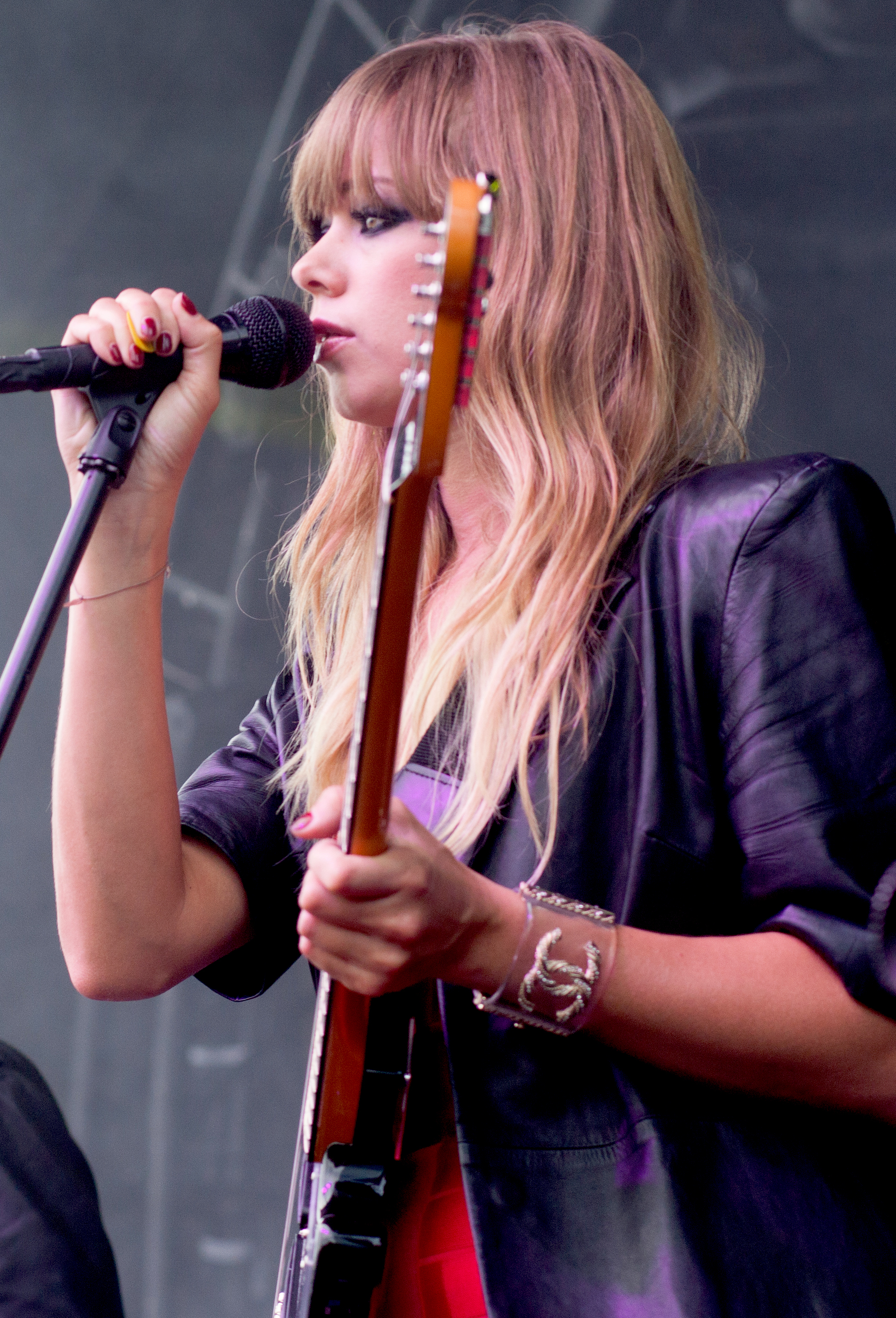
Ruth Radelet, musician and singer, Chromatics

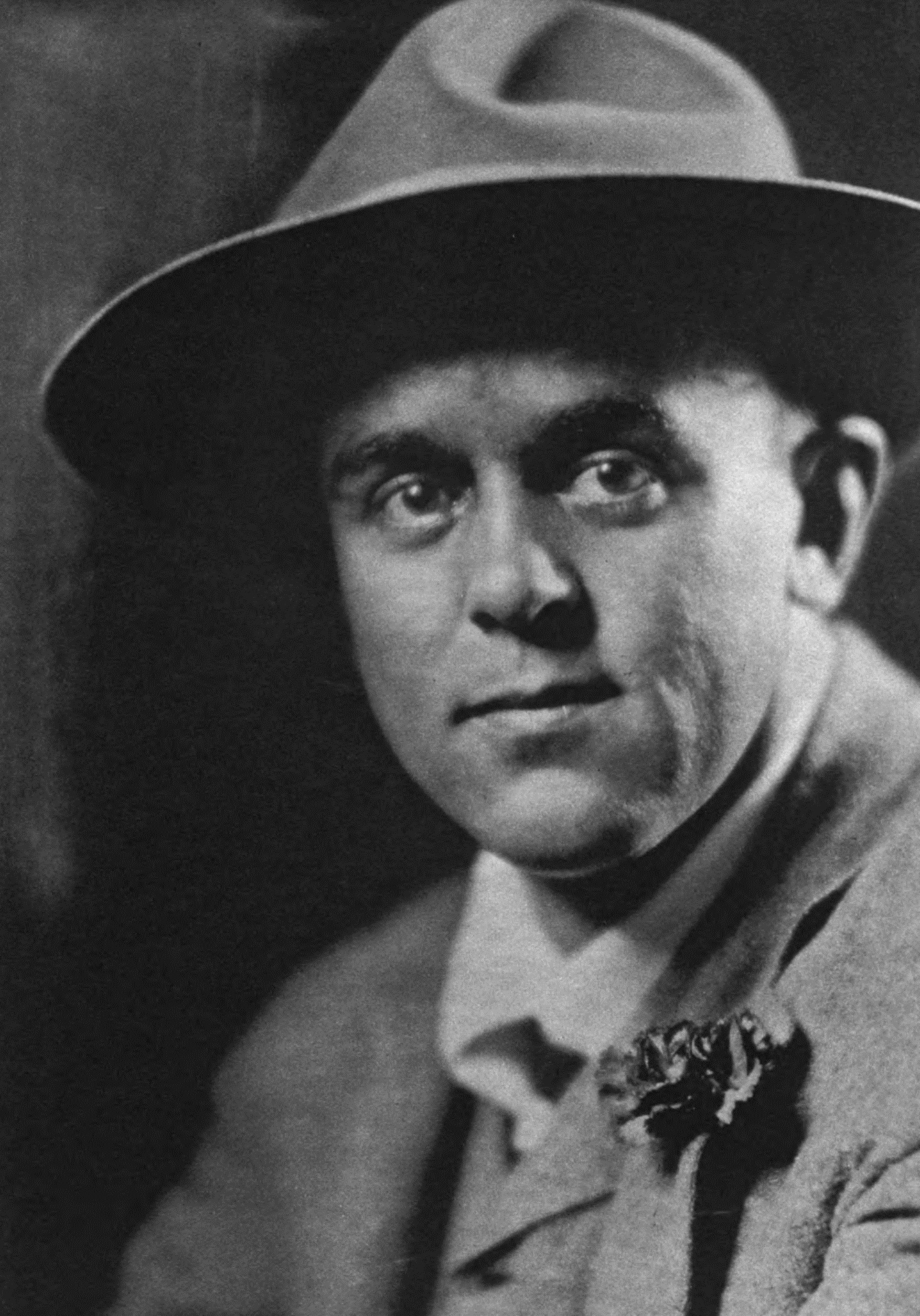
John Reed, journalist

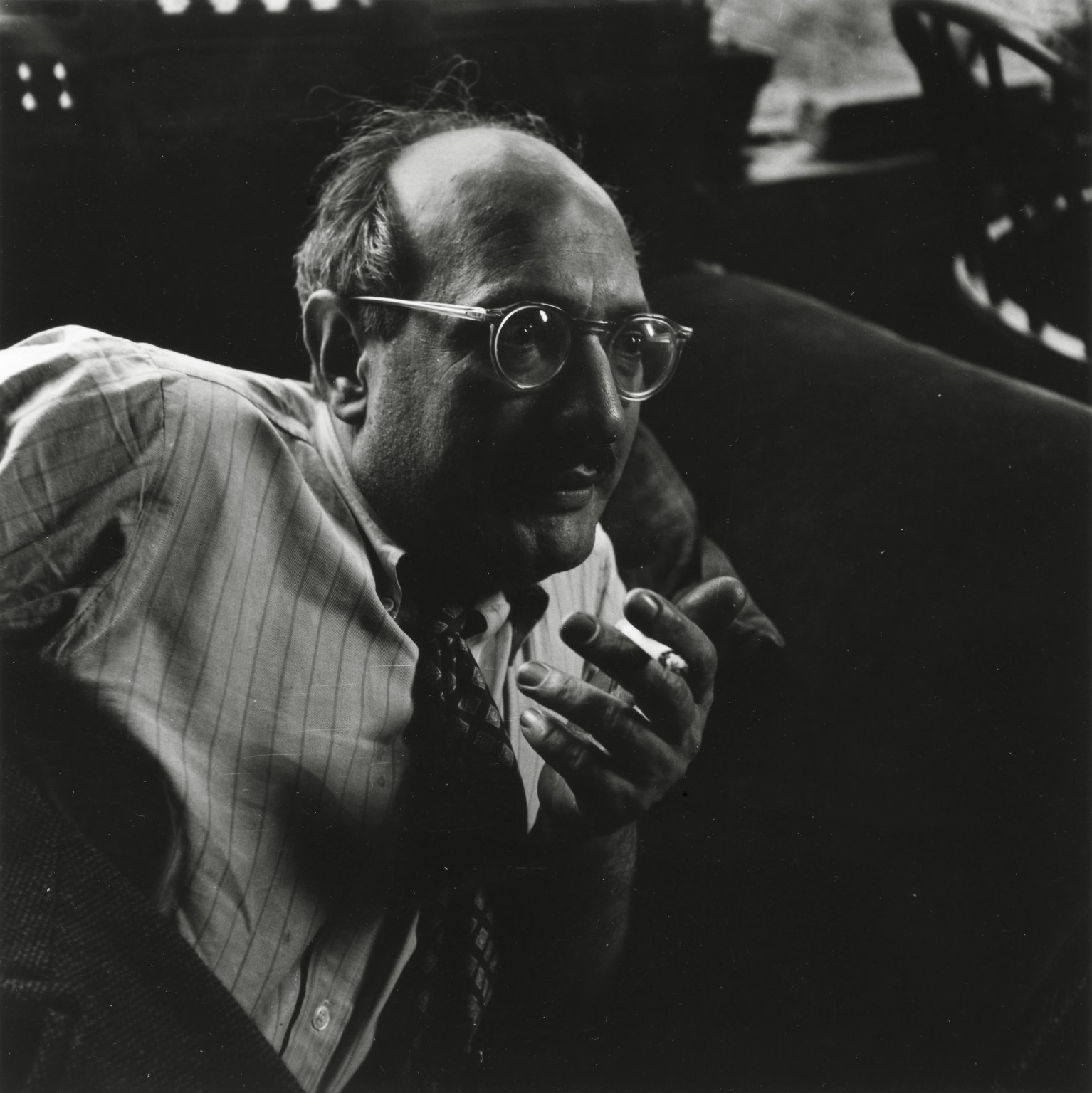
Mark Rothko, expressionist painter

Person	Lifespan	Notability	Born	Ref.
Ruth Radelet	1982–	Musician (Chromatics)	Yes	
Ahmad Rashad	1949–	NFL player	Yes	
Justin Rattner		Intel executive	No	
Johnnie Ray	1927–1990	Singer	No	
Max Records	1997–	Actor	Yes	
John Reed	1887–1920	Journalist	Yes	
Holiday Reinhorn	1964–	Writer	Yes	
Mel Renfro	1941–	NFL defensive back	No	
Rozz Rezabek	1960–	Punk singer (Negative Trend, Theatre of Sheep)	Yes	
Kim Rhodes	1969–	Actress	Yes	
Frank Rice	1892–1936	Actor	No	
Jeff Richards	1924–1989	Actor, baseball player	Yes	
Mike Richardson	1950–	Publisher, founder of Dark Horse Comics	Yes	
Lolita Ritmanis	1962–	Film composer	Yes	
Terry Robb	1956–	Guitarist	No	
Clete Roberts	1912–1984	Newscaster, actor	Yes	
Robert Robideau	1946–2009	Native American rights activist	Yes	
John Robison	1985–	Actor	Yes	
Cleveland S. Rockwell	1837–1907	Cartographer, artist	No	
Josef Rösch	1925–2016	Physician, radiologist	No	
Raina Rose	1982–	Folk singer	No	
Keri Rosebraugh		Artist	Yes	
Louis Conrad Rosenberg	1890–1983	Printmaker	Yes	
Alex Ross	1970–	Comic artist	Yes	
Marv Ross	1951–	Musician (Quarterflash)	Yes	
Rindy Ross	1951–	Singer, musician (Quarterflash)	Yes	
Mark Rothko	1903–1970	Artist	No	
Aaron Rowand	1970–	NFL player	Yes	
Greg Rucka	1969–	Novelist, comic writer	No	
Galen Rupp	1986–	Olympic distance runner	Yes	
Pat Russell	1923–2021	Los Angeles City Council member	Yes	
Rick Rydell	1963–	Writer, talk show host	No	
Nancy Ryles	1937–1990	Politician	Yes	

== S ==
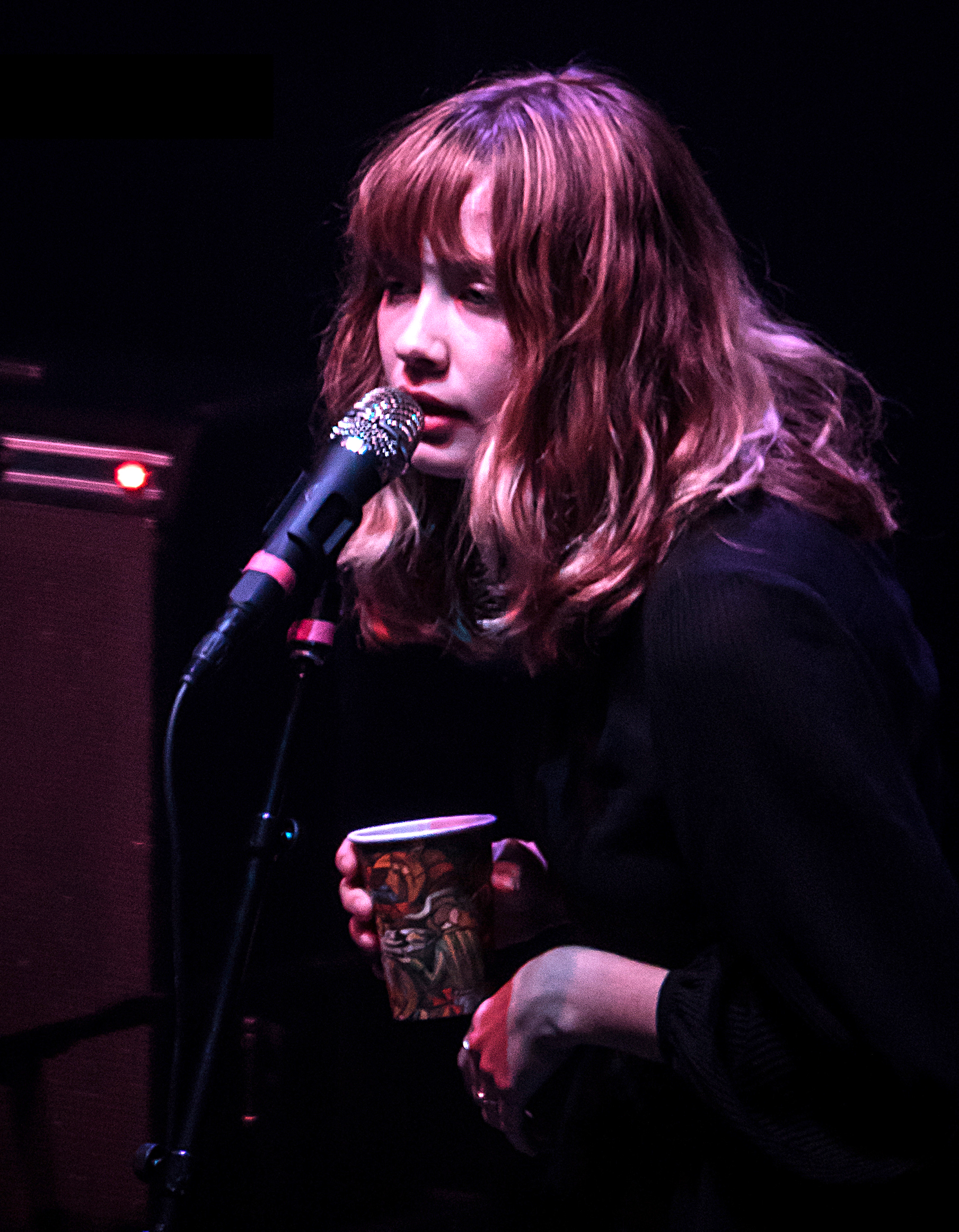
Alexandra Savior, singer-songwriter

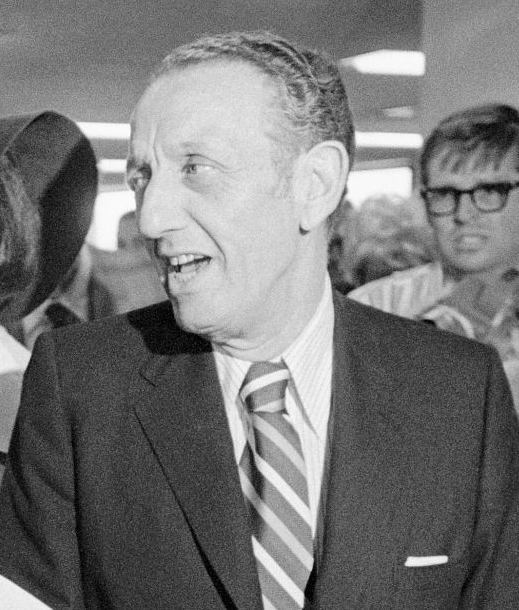
Norton Simon, billionaire industrialist

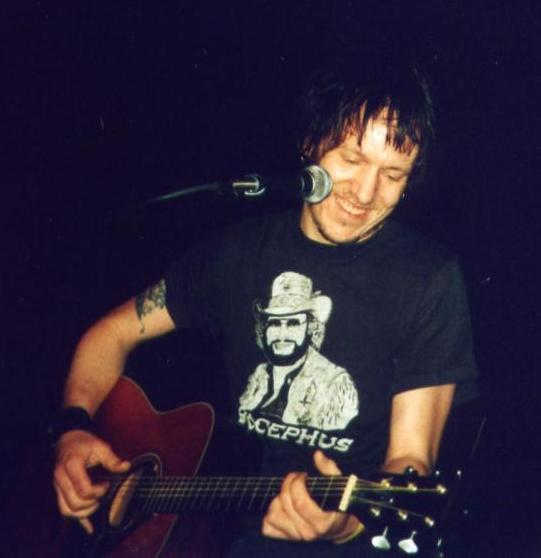
Elliott Smith, musician

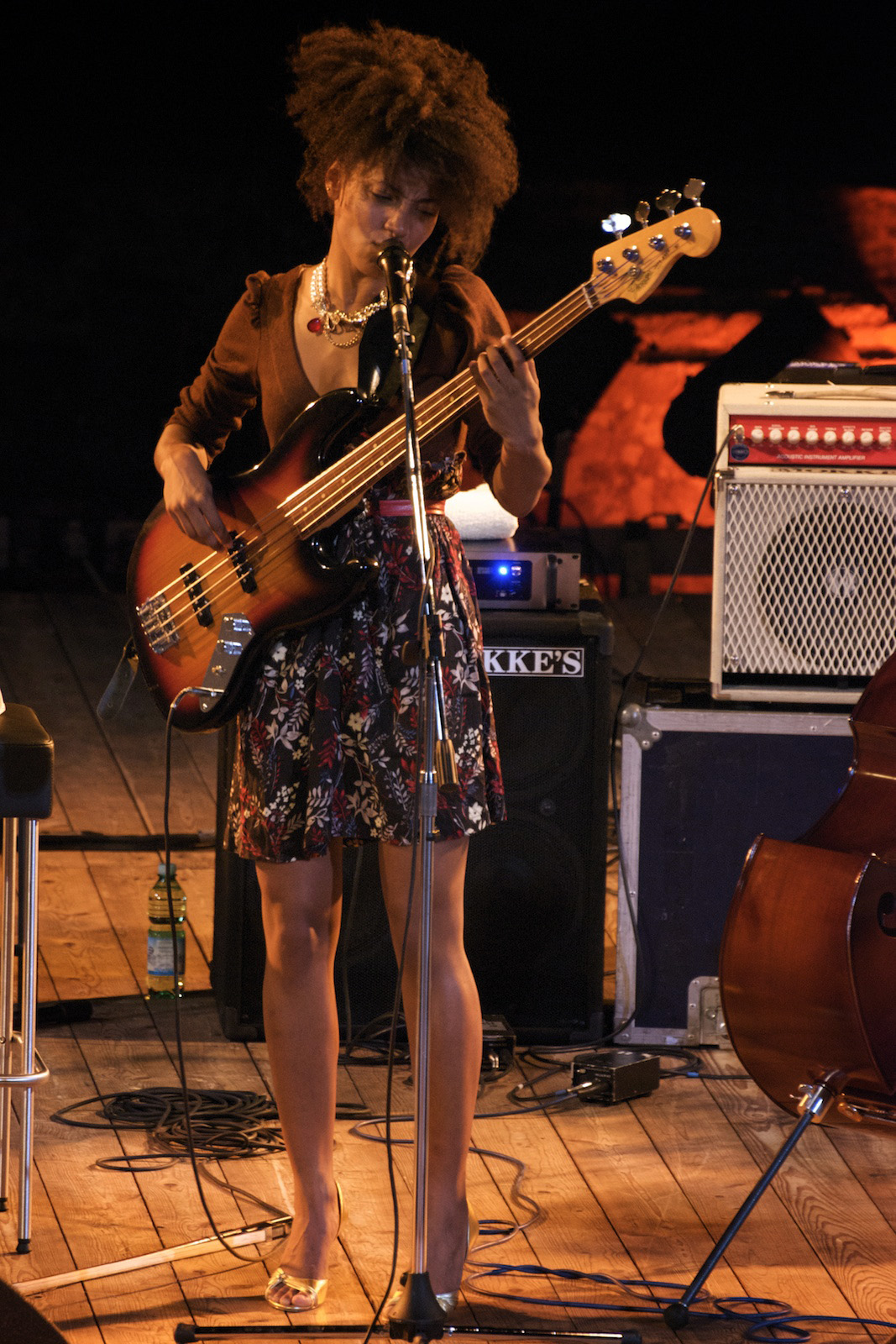
Esperanza Spalding, multi-Grammy winning musician

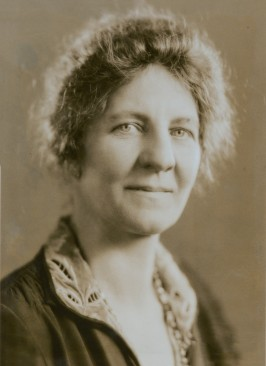
Mary Jane Spurlin, first female judge in Oregon

Person	Lifespan	Notability	Born	Ref.
Domantas Sabonis	1996-	Professional basketball player for the Sacramento Kings	Yes	
Joe Sacco	1960–	Graphic novel journalist	No	
Katee Sackhoff	1980–	Actress	Yes	
Greg Sage	1952–	Musician, singer (Wipers)	No	
Alberto Salazar	1958–	Olympic track athlete, coach until he was banned for life	No	
Curtis Salgado	1954–	Singer	No	
Mary F. Sammons	1954–	Businesswoman, former CEO of Rite Aid and Fred Meyer	Yes	
Rick Sanders	1945–1972	Freestyle wrestler, World Champion and two-time Olympic silver medalist	Yes	
Tim Savage		Comedian and internet personality known as Skweezy Jibbs	No	
Alexandra Savior	1995–	Singer-songwriter	Yes	
Rebecca Schaeffer	1967–1989	Actress	No	
Anne Schedeen	1949–	Actress	Yes	
Monte Scheinblum	1967–	Long-driving golf champion	Yes	
Dan Schmid	1962–	Musician	Yes	
Gerald Schwartz	1941–	Mathematician	Yes	
Randal L. Schwartz	1961–	Author, convicted computer criminal	Yes	
Gordon Scott	1926–2007	Actor	Yes	
Harvey W. Scott	1838–1910	Publisher	No	
Leslie M. Scott	1878–1968	Politician, historian	Yes	
Ynez Seabury	1907–1973	Actress	Yes	
Daniel Seavey	1999–	Musician, contestant of American Idol	Yes	
Gwenn Seemel	1981–	Artist	No	
Della Sehorn	1927–2001	Olympic swimmer	Yes	
Richie Sexson	1974–	Major League Baseball player	Yes	
Susan Shadburne	1942–2018	Filmmaker	Yes	
Ari Shapiro	1978–	Journalist	No	
Caroline Shaw	1982–	Musician	No	
David Shipley	1963–	Journalist, editor of Bloomberg View, formerly The New York Times	Yes	
Floyd Simmons	1925–1996	Football player	Yes	
Danny Simon	1918–2005	Television writer	No	
Norton Simon	1907–1993	Billionaire industrialist	Yes	
Christine Sinclair	1983-	Canadian soccer player	No	
Jacques Singer	1910–1980	Violinist, conductor of the Oregon Symphony (1962–1972)	No	
Lori Singer	1957–	Actress, cellist	No	
Ernst Skarstedt	1857–1929	Author	No	
Joseph A. Sladen	1841–1911	Union Army recipient of the Medal of Honor	No	
Elliott Smith	1969–2003	Musician	No	
Harry Everett Smith	1923–1991	Archivist, ethnomusicologist	Yes	
Lawrence Leighton Smith	1936–2013	Conductor	Yes	
Marie Smith	1898–1991	Activist	No	
Todd Snider	1959–2025	Musician	Yes	
Esperanza Spalding	1984–	Musician	Yes	
Tom Spanbauer	1946–	Author	No	
Erik Spoelstra	1970–	NBA coach	No	
Mary Jane Spurlin	1883–1970	First female judge in Oregon	No	
Matthew Stadler	1959–	Author	No	
William Stafford	1914–1993	Poet	No	
Katy Steding	1967–	Basketball player, head coach at Boston University	Yes	
Bob Steele	1907–1988	Actor	Yes	
Dave Stevens	1955–2008	Illustrator, comic artist	No	
Melvin Storer	1921–2003	United States Navy shipfitter	Yes	
Tempest Storm	1928–2021	Burlesque dancer	No	
Damon Stoudamire	1973–	NBA player, coach	Yes	
Salim Stoudamire	1982–	NBA player	Yes	
Steven Strauss		Author and lawyer	No	
Cheryl Strayed	1968–	Author, essayist	No	
Brenda Strong	1960–	Actress	Yes	
Arthur Dewey Struble	1894–1983	United States admiral	Yes	
Sally Struthers	1947–	Actress	Yes	
Ndamukong Suh	1987–	NFL player	Yes	
Jon Micah Sumrall	1980–	Singer, musician (Kutless)	No	

== T ==
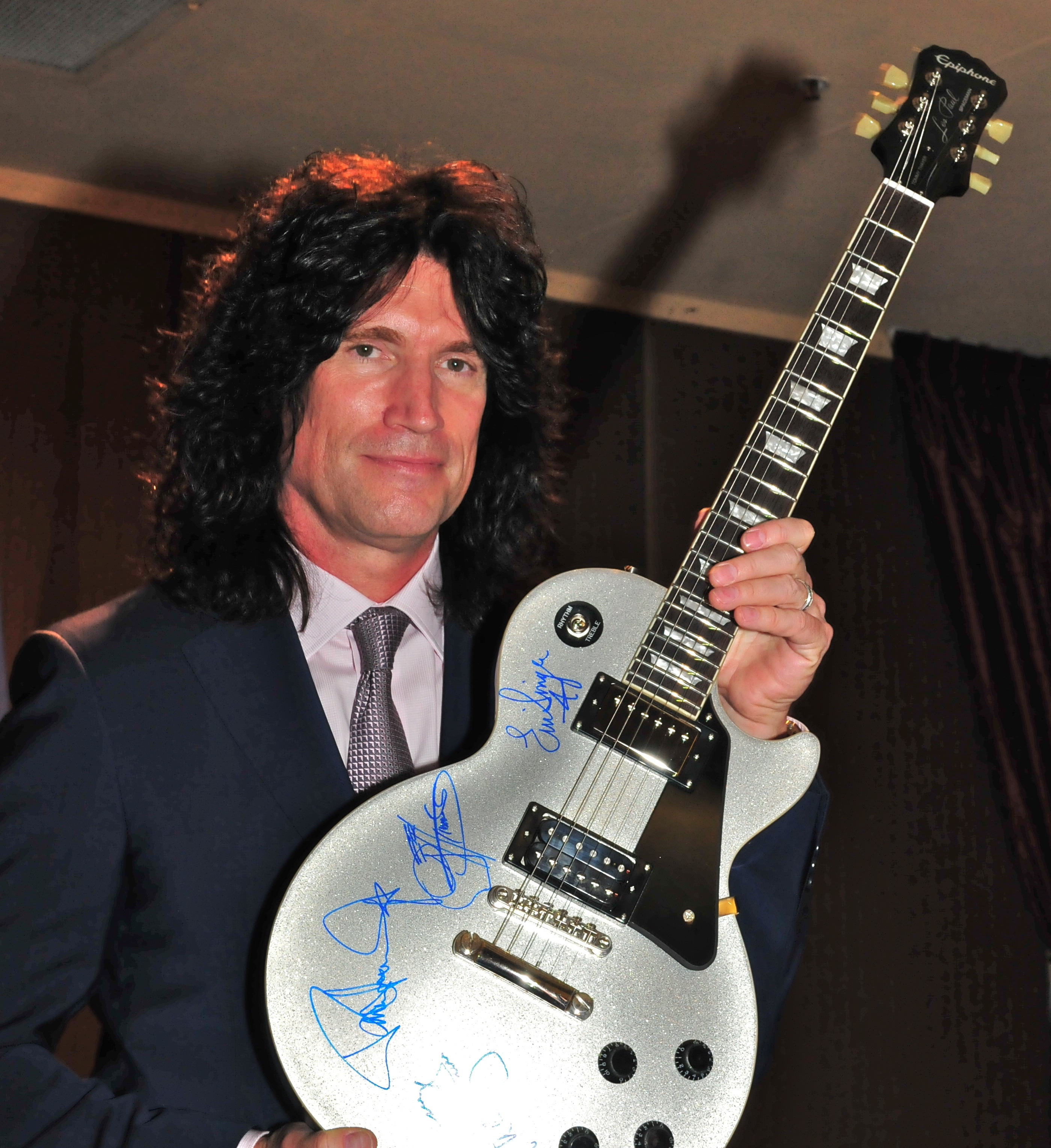
Tommy Thayer, lead guitarist of Kiss

Person	Lifespan	Notability	Born	Ref.
Deb Talan	1968–	Singer-songwriter (The Weepies)	No	
Simon Tam	1981–	Musician (The Slants)	No	
Jacob Tanzer	1935–2018	Politician	No	
Ruth Taylor	1905–1984	Actress	No	
Thelma Taylor	1933–1949	Murder victim	Yes	
Courtney Taylor-Taylor	1967–	Musician	Yes	
James Terwilliger	1809–1892	Pioneer, namesake of Terwilliger Boulevard	No	
Maria Thayer	1975–	Actress	Yes	
Tommy Thayer	1960–	Musician (Kiss)	Yes	
Twinka Thiebaud	1945–	Model	No	
Ural Thomas	1939–	Soul music singer	No	
Craig Thompson	1975–	Graphic novelist	No	
Chiye Tomihiro	1924–2012	Japanese-American activist	Yes	
Barbara Thorne Stevenson	1909–1985	Soprano	Yes	
Kirk Thornton	1956–	Voice actor	Yes	
Tori	1964–	Bodybuilder	Yes	
Linus Torvalds	1969–	Organizer of Linux operating system kernel	No	
Michael Totten	1970-	Foreign correspondent, writer	No	
Vecepia Towery	1965–	Winner of Survivor: Marquesas	Yes	
Pennie Lane Trumbull	1954–	Socialite	Yes	
Corin Tucker	1972–	Musician (Sleater-Kinney)	No	
Richmond K. Turner	1885–1961	U.S. Navy admiral	Yes	
Wayne Twitchell	1948–2010	Major League Baseball player	Yes	

== U ==
Person	Lifespan	Notability	Born	Ref.
Ime Udoka	1977–	NBA player, coach	Yes	
Mfon Udoka	1976–	WNBA player	Yes	
Sara Jean Underwood	1984–	Playboy Playmate, model	Yes	
Andrea U'Ren	1968–	Children's author, illustrator	No	

== V ==
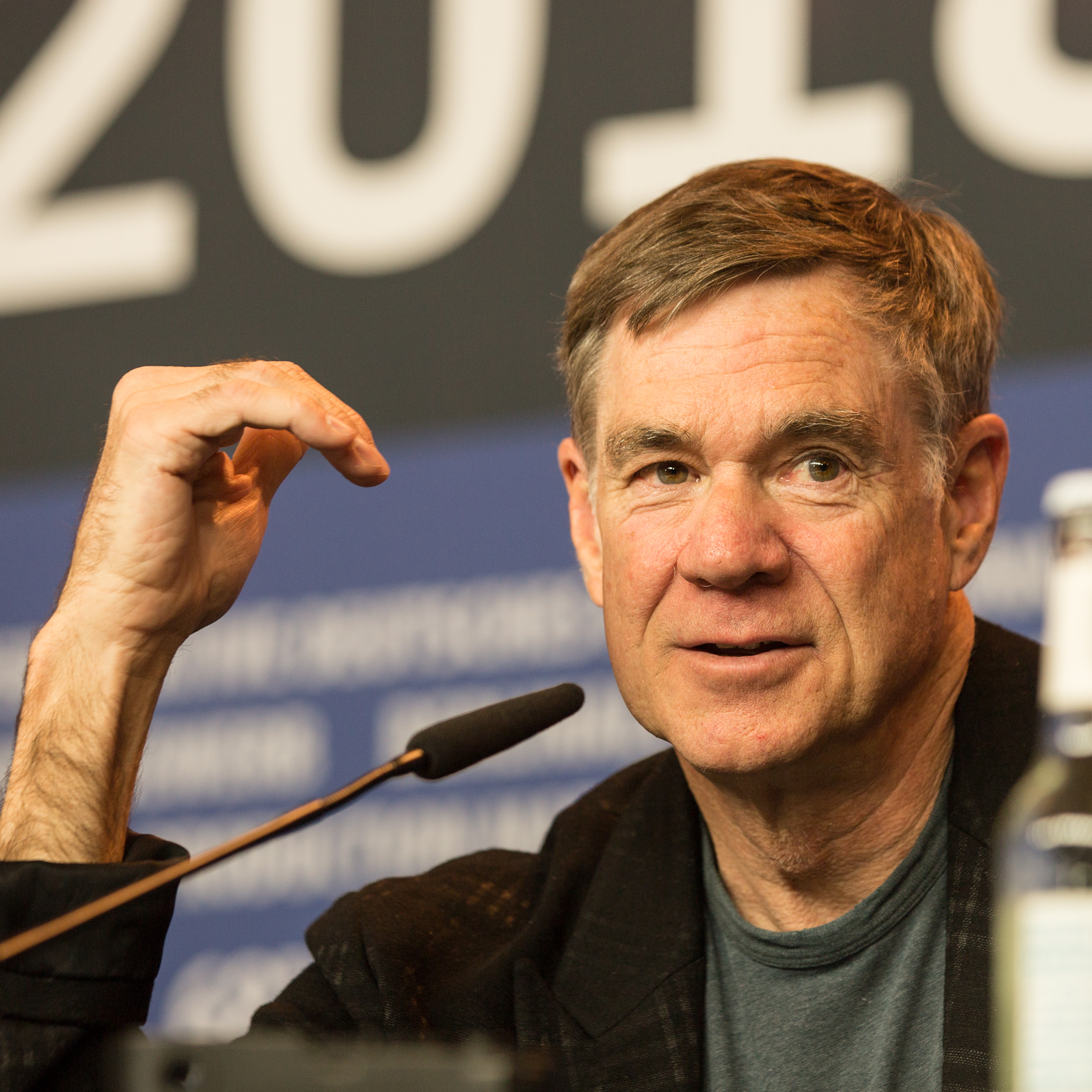
Gus Van Sant, filmmaker

Person	Lifespan	Notability	Born	Ref.
Gus Van Sant	1952–	Filmmaker	No	
Gino Vannelli	1952-	Singer-songwriter	No	
Laura Veirs	1973–	Singer-songwriter	No	
Will Vinton	1947–2018	Claymation animator	No	
Nicole Vogel		Publisher, author	No	
Tim Vollmer	1946–	Olympic discus thrower	Yes	
Howard Vollum	1913–1986	Engineer, founder of Tektronix	Yes	
Robert Vosper	1913–1994	Librarian (UCLA, University of Kansas)	Yes	

== W ==
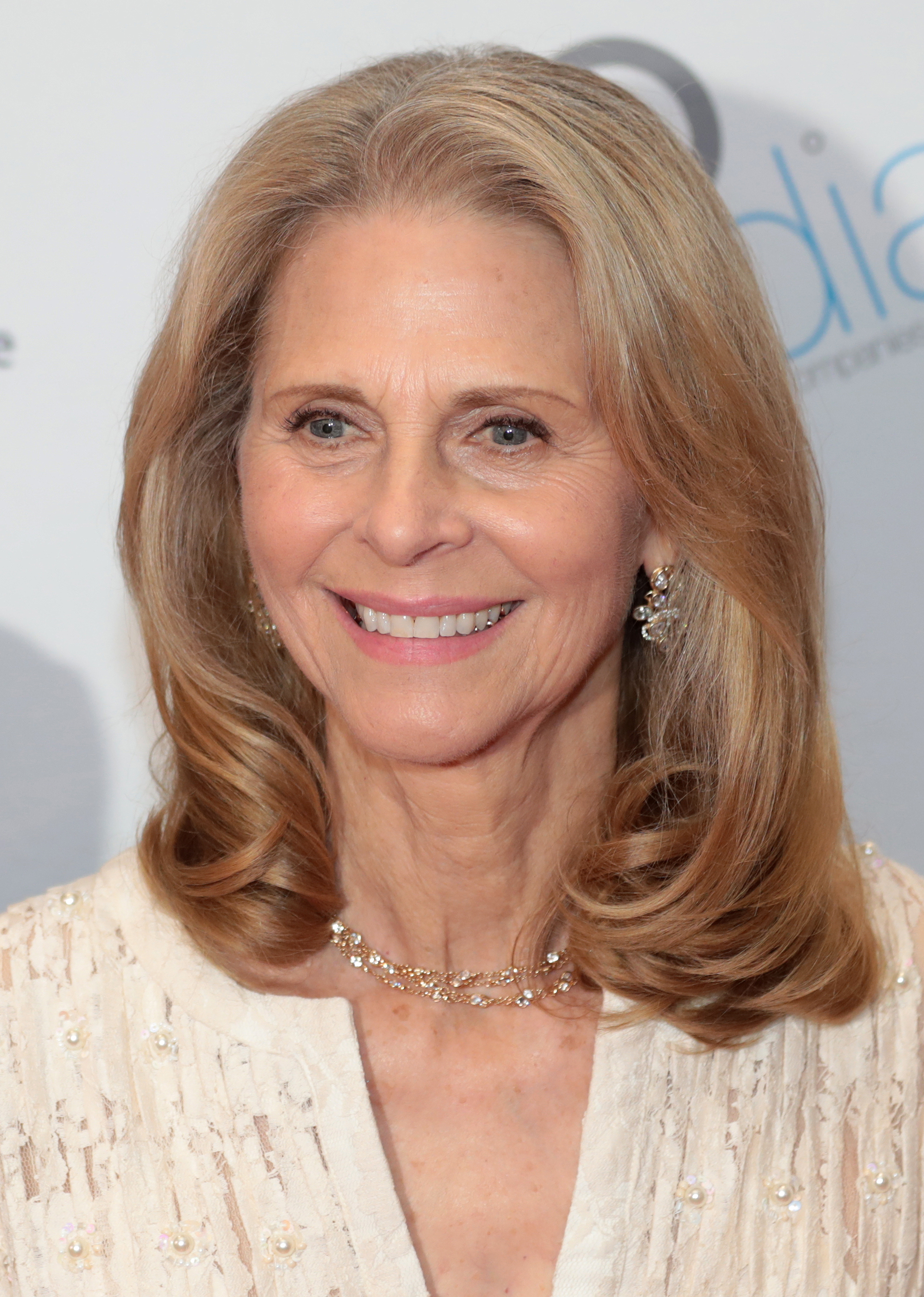
Lindsay Wagner, actress

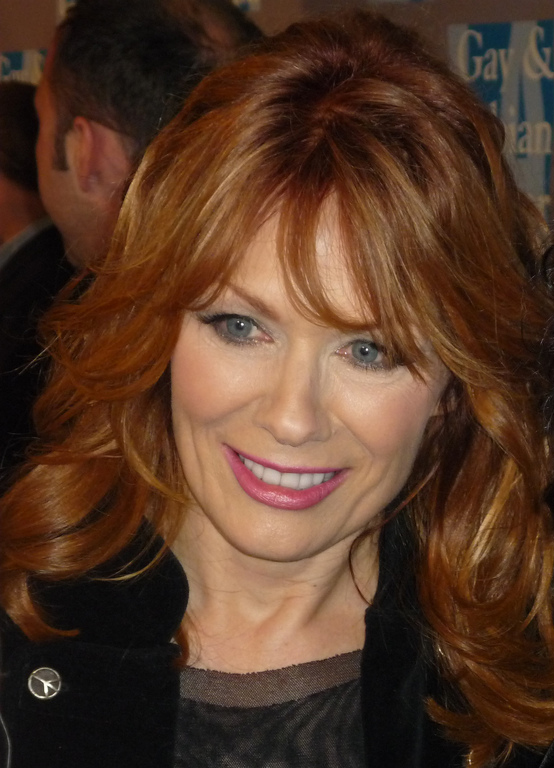
Nancy Wilson, singer and guitarist of Heart

Person	Lifespan	Notability	Born	Ref.
Lindsay Wagner	1949–	Actress	No	
Chris Walla	1975–	Musician (Death Cab for Cutie)	No	
Fred Walton	1949–	Film director	No	
Abby Wambach	1980–	Soccer player	No	
M. Ward	1973–	Musician	No	
Dominic Waters	1986–	Basketball player in the Israel Basketball Premier League	Yes	
Michaela Watkins	1971–	Comedian, actress	No	
Marie Watt	1967–	Sculptor	No	
Danny Way	1974–	Professional skateboarder	Yes	
Henry Weinhard	1830–1904	Brewer	No	
Janet Weiss	1965–	Drummer (Sleater-Kinney)	No	
Claxton Welch	1947–	NFL player	Yes	
E. Henry Wemme	1861–1914	Businessman	No	
Paul Wexler	1929–1979	Actor	Yes	
Philip Whalen	1923–2012	Poet	Yes	
Nancy Whang	1977–	Musician (LCD Soundsystem)	Yes	
Ted Wheeler	1962–	Mayor of Portland	Yes	
Minor White	1908–1976	Photographer	No	
Morris H. Whitehouse	1878–1944	Architect	Yes	
Andrew Wiederhorn	1966–	Entrepreneur	Yes	
Jacqueline Wiles	1992–	alpine skier	Yes	
Brad Wilk	1968–	Drummer (Rage Against the Machine, Audioslave)	Yes	
Gustaf Wilson	1827–1905	Businessman, Freemason	No	
Nancy Wilson	1954–	Musician (Heart)	No	
David Wolman		Author, journalist	No	
Carolyn Wood	1945–	Olympic swimmer	Yes	
Charles Erskine Scott Wood	1852–1944	Author, civil liberties advocate	No	
Randall Woodfield	1950–	Serial killer known as the I-5 Killer	No	
Martin Wong	1949–1999	Painter	Yes	
Renn Woods	1958–	Actress	No	
Thomas H. Wright	1873–1928	Electrician, teacher	No	
Ron Wyden	1949-	U.S. senator; former U.S. congressman	Yes	
Anthony Wynn	1962–	Playwright	No	

== Y ==
Person	Lifespan	Notability	Born	Ref.
John Yeon	1910–1994	Architect	Yes	
Harold Young	1897–1970	Film and theater director	Yes	
Joan Young	1937–1985	Actress	Yes	
Lidia Yuknavitch	1963–	Writer	No	
Yeat	2000–	Rapper	No	

== Z ==
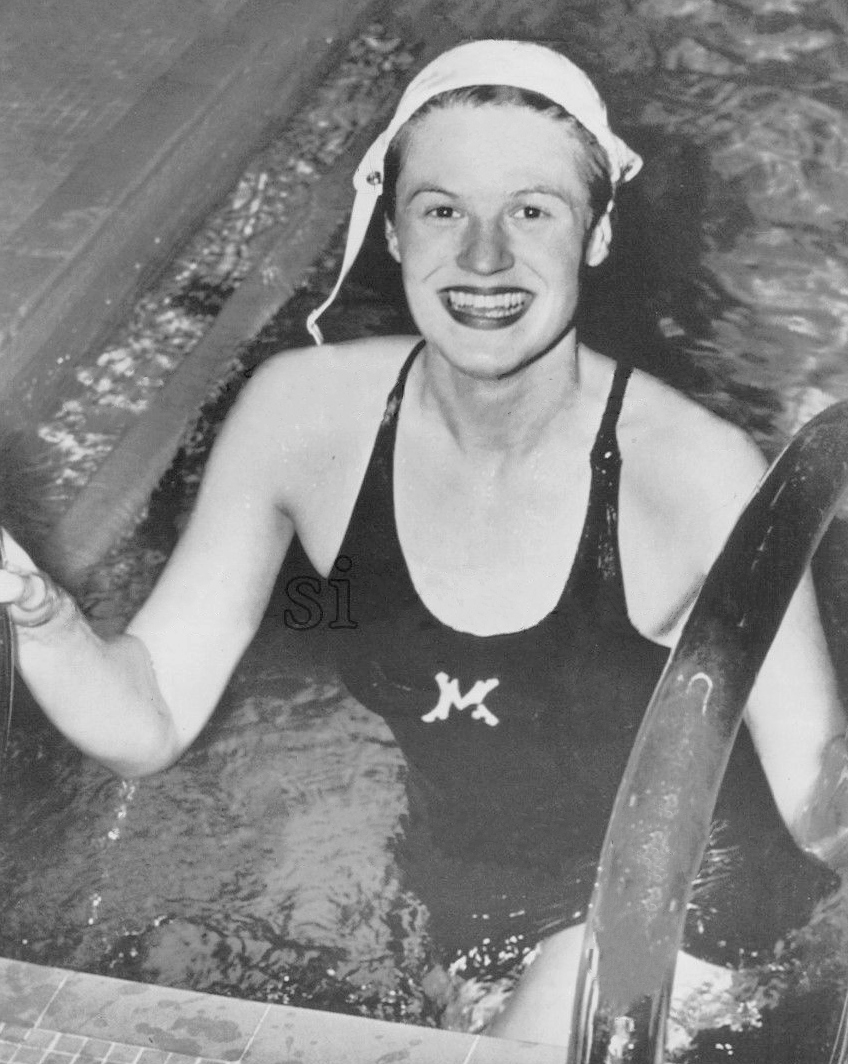
Suzanne Zimmerman, Olympic swimmer

Person	Lifespan	Notability	Born	Ref.
Mariel Zagunis	1985–	Two-time Olympic gold medalist in fencing	Yes	
Richard Zander	1964–	Figure skater	Yes	
Alexandra Zapp	1971–2002	Murder victim	Yes	
Suzanne Zimmerman	1925–2021	Olympic silver medalist swimmer	Yes	
Peter Zuckerman	1979–	Journalist	No	
Mark Zusman	1954–	Publisher	No	
