= List of artists and art institutions in Portland, Oregon =

The following is a partial list of institutions and individuals who are notable and active in the art scene of Portland, Oregon.

== Museums ==
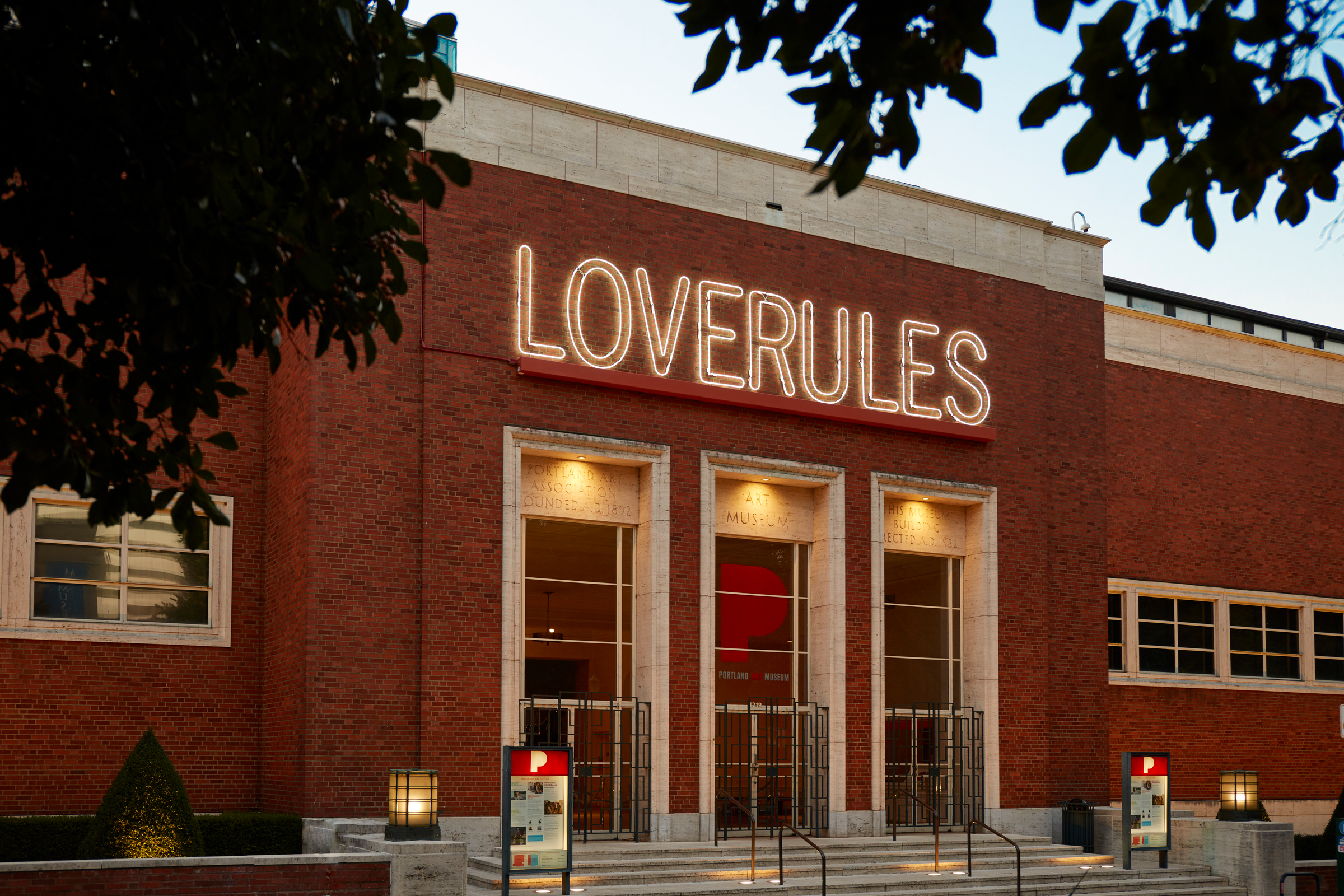
Portland Art Museum

- Museum of Contemporary Craft - Closed in 2016
- Portland Art Museum

== Colleges and universities with art programs and or major exhibition programs ==
- George Fox University
- Lewis & Clark College
- Linfield University
- Northwest Film Center
- Pacific Northwest College of Art
- Portland State University
- Reed College Cooley Gallery

== Nonprofit or alternative spaces and other institutions ==
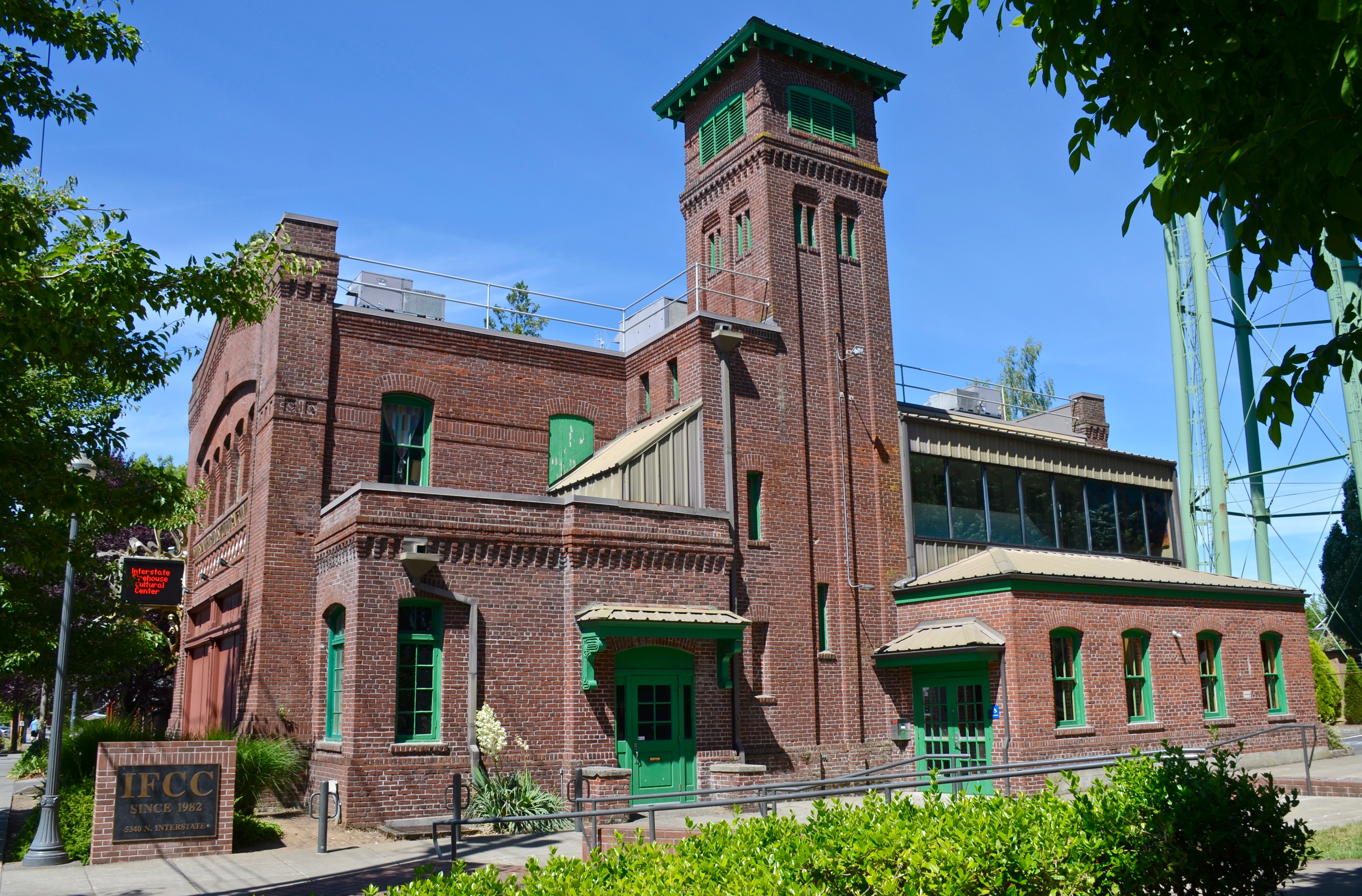
Interstate Firehouse Cultural Center

- Oregon Contemporary
- Imago Theatre
- Interstate Firehouse Cultural Center
- Oregon Biennial
- Portland Documentary and Experimental Film Festival
- Portland Institute for Contemporary Art
- Portland Museum of Modern Art
- Powell's Books Basil Hallward Gallery
- Project Grow
- Regional Arts & Culture Council
- Yale Union

== Publications/BLOGs ==
- The Bear Deluxe — art, literature, and environmental magazine
- The Oregonian — daily newspaper of record containing some arts coverage
- PLAZM — art and design magazine
- PORT — dedicated visual art blog with daily art news, interviews and reviews
- The Portland Mercury — weekly newspaper containing some arts coverage
- Portland Tribune — twice-weekly newspaper containing some arts coverage
- Willamette Week — weekly newspaper containing some arts coverage

== Curators, critics & writers ==
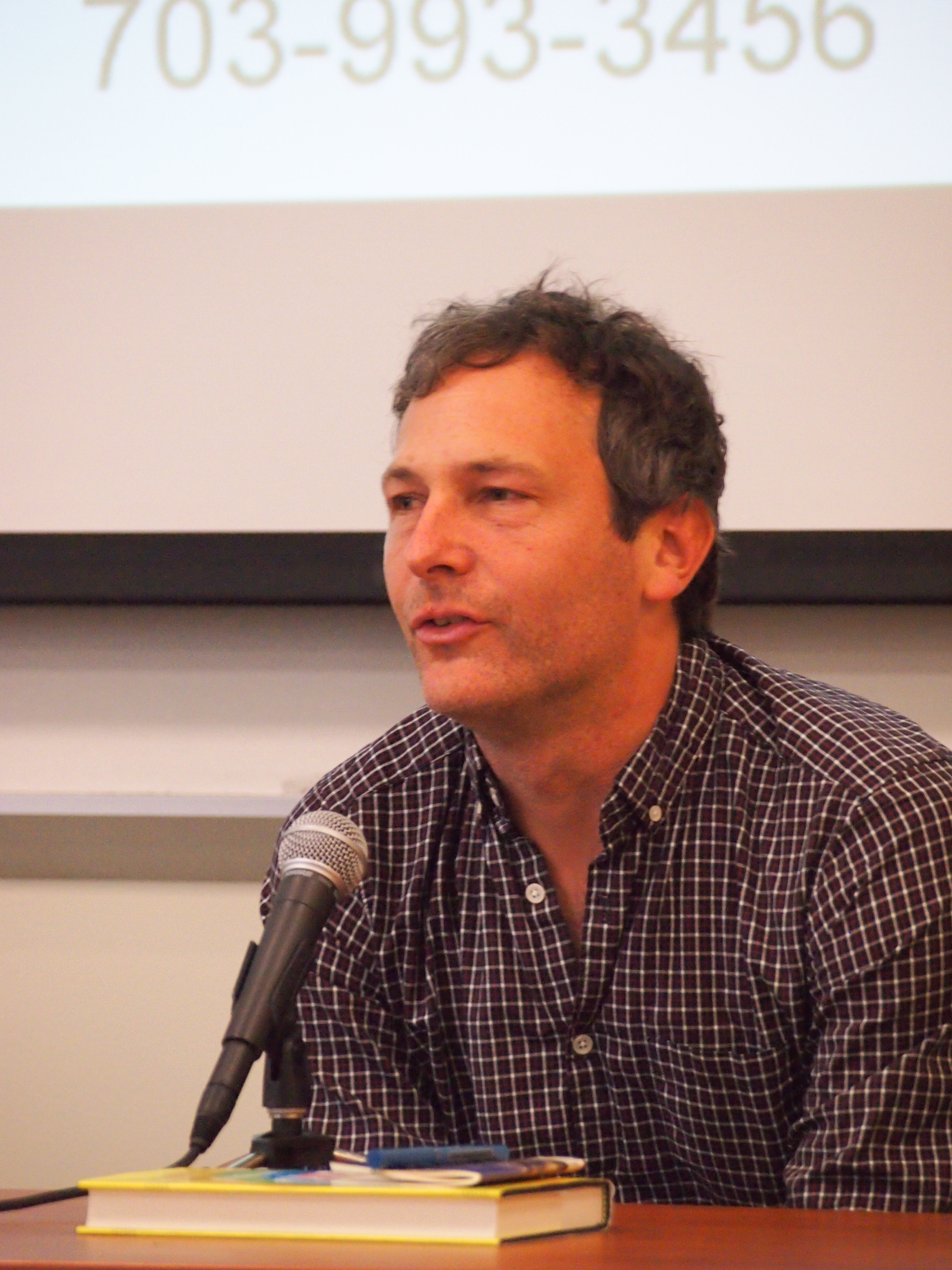
Jonathan Raymond

- Gordon Gilkey
- Jeff Jahn
- Kristan Kennedy
- Mack McFarland
- Cris Moss
- Jenene Nagy
- Jonathan Raymond
- Matthew Stadler

== Artists ==
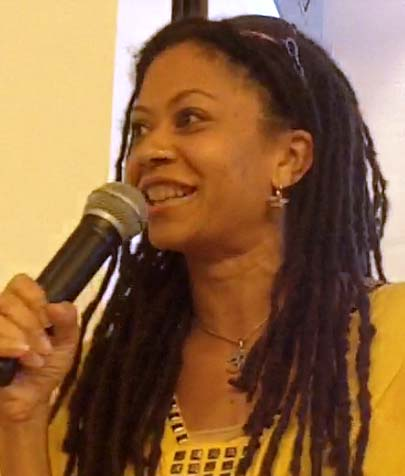
damali ayo

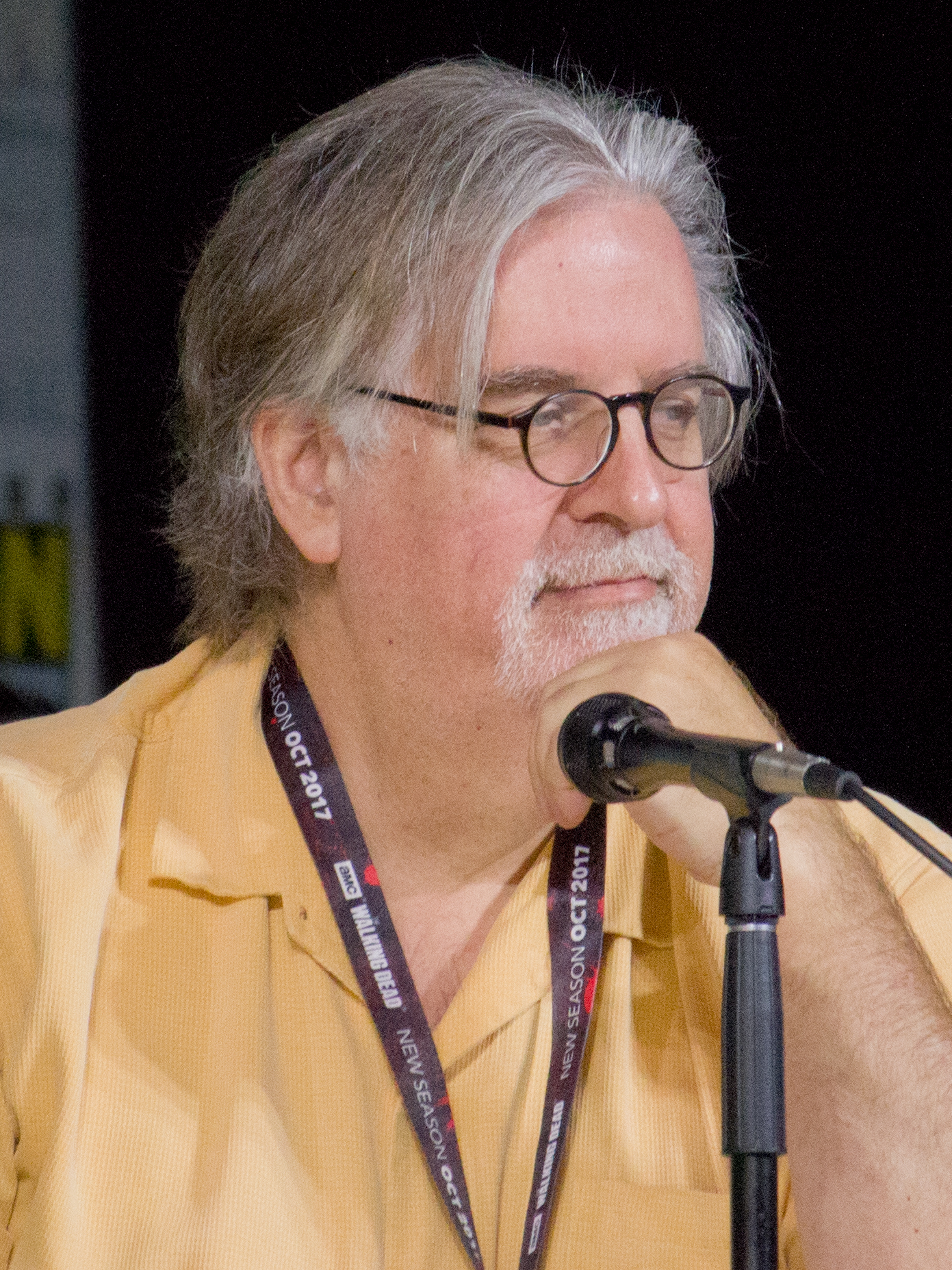
Matt Groening

- Brad Adkins (born 1973)
- Dan Attoe (born 1975)
- Damali Ayo (born 1972)
- Lance Bangs (born 1972)
- Becca Bernstein (born 1977)
- Trevor Chowning (born 1972)
- Bruce Conkle
- Tom Cramer
- Jen Delos Reyes
- Richard Diebenkorn (1922–1993)
- Carson Ellis (born 1975)
- Harrell Fletcher (born 1967)
- Laura Fritz
- Matt Groening (born 1954)
- MK Guth (born 1963)
- Sally Haley (1908–2007)
- Susan J. Harlan (born 1950)
- Todd Haynes (born 1961)
- Sean Healy
- Jessica Jackson Hutchins (born 1971)
- Jennifer Jako (born 1973)
- Aaron Flint Jamison (born 1979)
- Chris Johanson (born 1968)
- Maude Kerns (1876–1965)
- Les McClaine (born 1977)
- Mack McFarland
- Matt McCormick (born 1972)
- Carl Morris (1911–1993)
- Andy Paiko (born 1977)
- Red 76
- Wendy Red Star (born 1981)
- Jim Riswold (born 1957)
- Stephanie Robison (born 1976)
- Patrick Rock (born 1951)
- Mark Rothko (1903–1970)
- Craig Thompson (born 1975)
- Gus Van Sant (born 1952)
- Marie Watt (born 1967)
- Minor White (1908–1976)
- Phyllis Yes (born 1941)

== Architects ==
- Pietro Belluschi (1899–1994)
- Brad Cloepfil (born 1956)
- John Yeon (1910–1994)

== See also ==
- Culture of Portland, Oregon
- Lists of Oregon-related topics
- Mike Bennett Studios
