= Houston Center for Contemporary Craft =

Coordinates: 29°43′51″N 95°23′10″W

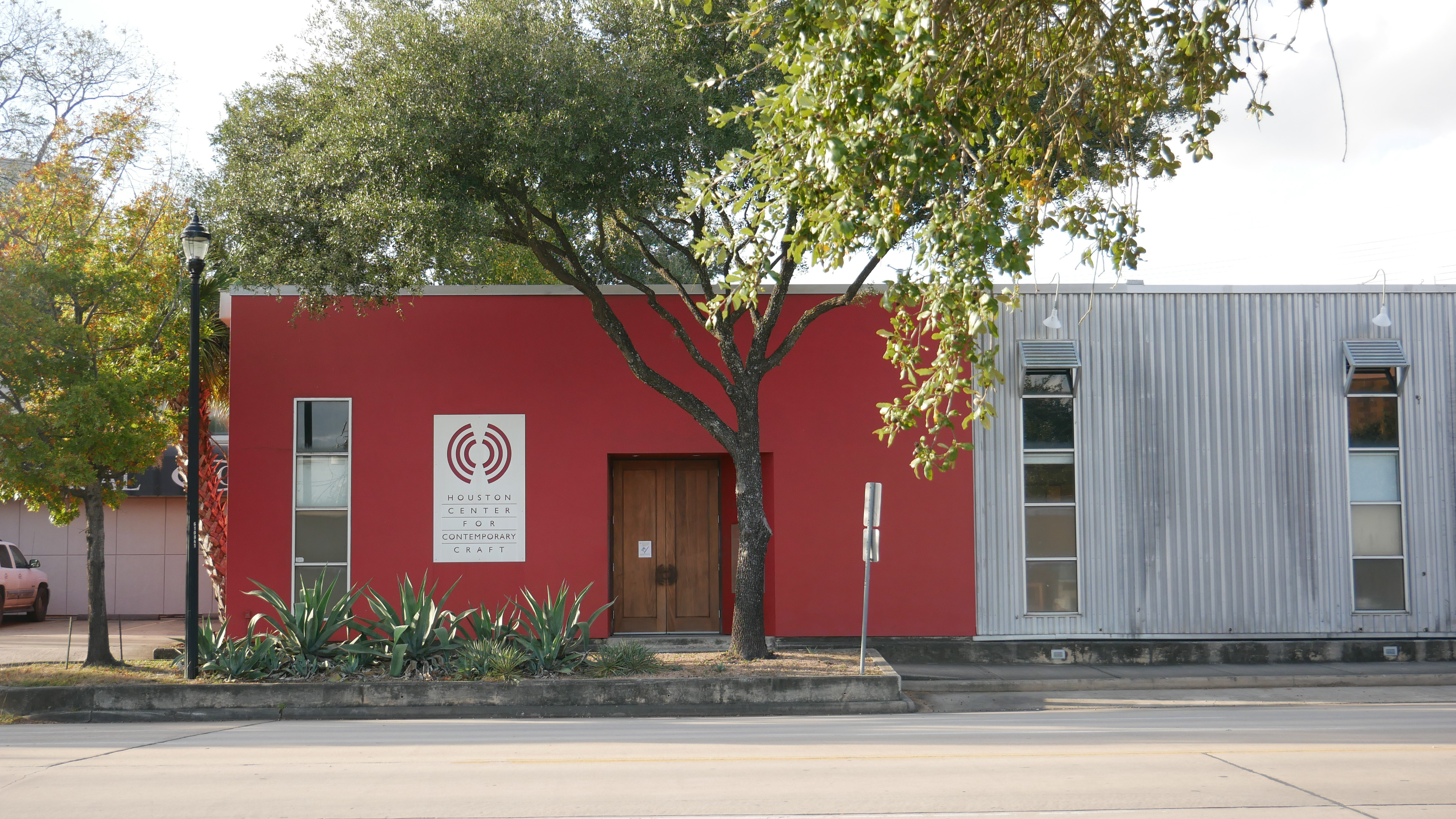
- Exterior - Houston Center for Contemporary Craft
- Established: September 2001
- Location: 4848 Main Street, Houston, Texas
- Type: Arts center
- Visitors: 12,807 (2017)
- Executive director: Perry Allen Price
- President: Brad Bucher
- Public transit access: Wheeler Transit Center, Museum District MetroRail
- Website: crafthouston.org

The Houston Center for Contemporary Craft is a non-profit arts organization that offers exhibitions, educational programming, and an artist-in-residence program from their building in the Houston Museum District. The center was founded in September 2001 with the goal of furthering education and public awareness of contemporary craft pieces, or artworks made from materials like wood, glass, fiber, metal, and recycled materials.

HCCC is funded by grants from many organizations, including the Houston Art Alliance, the National Endowment For The Arts, Houston Endowment, Inc., the Texas Commission on The Arts, The Brown Foundation, the Kinder Foundation, and private donations. The center is free to the public and open most days of the week. As of 2017, HCCC saw an average of nearly 13,000 visitors and hosted 5-10 resident artists annually.

== Exhibitions ==
The center's exhibition spaces include the Main Gallery and the Front Gallery, each of which host several revolving exhibitions a year, and the Artist's Hall, where current resident artists can work and share their pieces. The Asher Gallery serves as an in-house sales space for local artists, makers, and creative vendors, and it regularly hosts special events and pop-up shops.

The HCCC has hosted dozens of group and solo shows, all centering contemporary craft and crafters. In addition to an annual resident artist exhibition, notable exhibitions have included:

- Judy Jensen: Feverish, 2002
- Gijs Bakker: Selected Retrospective, 2002
- Poetics of Clay: An International Perspective, 2003
- Metaphor & Magnitude: Kendall Buster & Donald Fortescue, 2005
- Kickin' it with Joyce J. Scott, 2007
- Richard Black: The Art of Cue, 2007
- Warren Mackenzie: Legacy of an American Potter, 2008
- Craft in America - Expanding Traditions, 2008
- Texas Master Series: Rachelle Thiewes, 2009
- Lisa Gralnick: The Gold Standard, 2011
- Arline Fisch: Creatures From The Deep, 2011
- Beyond Useful & Beautiful: Rethinking Domestic Craft, 2011
- Bridge 11: Lia Cook, 2012
- Transference: Andy Paiko & Ethan Rose, 2012
- Dark Light: The Micaceous Ceramics of Christine Nofchissey Mchorse, 2014
- Course of Action: 50 Years of Jewelry and Enamel at the Glassell School of Art, 2015
- Wendy Maruyama: The WildLIFE Project, 2015
- Found Objects: Works by Sondra Sherman, 2016
- Future Traditions: Melissa Cody, 2017
- Annie Evelyn: Multiple Impressions, 2017
- Justin Favela: All You Can Eat, 2019
- Weave Houston: Celebrating 71 Years of The Contemporary Handweavers of Houston, 2021
- Texas Master Series: James C. Watkins, 2021

== Craft garden ==
The Craft Garden is a joint venture between artists, gardeners, and other Houston community members to maintain an outdoor educational exhibition space that is unique to HCCC. Rather than focusing on flowering or edible plants, The Craft Garden features four separate spaces dedicated to the plants used to make baskets, textiles, dyes, and papers. A small selection of plants in the garden include: turmeric, madder, and indigo used primarily for dyes, and brown cotton and ramie, used largely for basket-making, weaving, paper-making, and other fiber arts. The center often hosts educational workshops in the garden, and resident artists are invited to harvest materials for their practices directly from the ground, to be inspired by the natural environment it offers, and to install exhibits outdoors.

In addition to the plants themselves, HCCC partners with a local beekeeping organization to maintain a community of rooftop honeybees that both pollinate the garden and provide educational opportunities to visitors. HCCC's Craft Garden is a member of Urban Harvest, a Houston-based network of almost 150 edible and educational gardens.

== Artist residency ==
The HCCC's artist-in-residence program has been active since the center's inception in 2001, providing not only studio space but educational opportunities, a stipend that covers materials and living spaces, and group exhibitions to 5-10 artists annually. The residencies are flexible, offering lengths of commitment that range from three to twelve months. Resident artists create art on-site, often utilizing both the Craft Garden and the available studios. They are required to open their studios to the public for at least two days a week, one of which must be on Saturday. Residencies conclude with artist talks and exhibitions. As of 2016, HCCC had hosted 113 artists since beginning the program in 2001.

Notable past resident artists include:

- Anila Quayyum Agha, interdisciplinary artist, 2005
- Susan Budge, ceramic sculptor, 2015
- Stephanie Robison, fiber artist, 2021
- Michael Velliquette, paper artist, 2021
- Hillerbrand+Magsamen, interdisciplinary artists, 2021
