= Avantika Bawa =

Indian-American artist (born 1973)

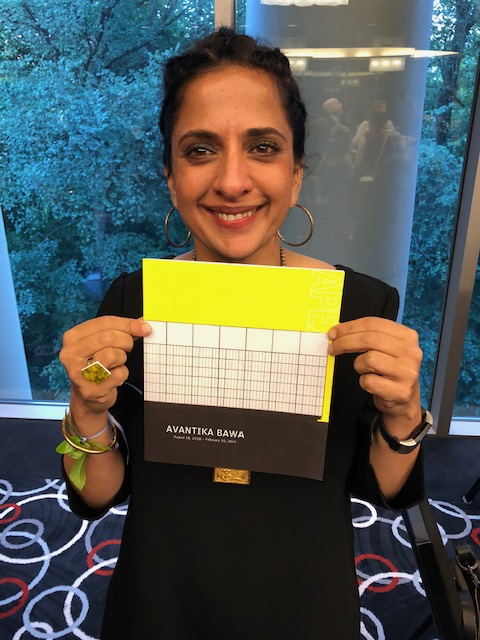
- Bawa at the Portland Art Museum, 2018
- Born: Ooty, Tamil Nadu, India
- Education: Maharaja Sayajirao University of Baroda; School of the Art Institute of Chicago

Avantika Bawa (born 1973) is an Indian American artist, curator, and professor of art. Bawa is a multidisciplinary artist who works primarily in site-specific installation, drawing, printmaking, and video. Drawing from Minimalism and Abstraction for inspiration, she responds to and incorporates architectural spaces and styles. Bawa's work has been exhibited both nationally and internationally.

== Education ==
Bawa has an MFA in painting from the School of the Art Institute of Chicago and a BFA from the Maharaja Sayajirao University.

== Career ==
Bawa is a professor of art at Washington State University Vancouver, and served from 2014 to 2024 on the board of the Oregon Arts Commission.

Bawa has had solo exhibitions at the Portland Art Museum in Portland, Oregon, Suyama Space in Seattle; Saltworks Gallery in Atlanta; Disjecta Contemporary Arts Center in Portland, Oregon; and Gallery Maskara in Mumbai, India.

Bawa is also one of the founders of Drain - A Journal of Contemporary Art and Culture. Archived in the Library of Congress, Drain is an online journal that explores creative perspectives on contemporary culture.

In 2019, Bawa was commissioned to make a commemorative game day poster for the Portland Trail Blazers' January 9 game against the Chicago Bulls.

== Awards ==
Bawa is the recipient of the 2018 Crow's Shadow Institute of the Arts Golden Spot Residency Award, the Hallie Ford Fellowship in the Visual Arts, and the Oregon Arts Commission Joan Shipley Award.

As an assistant professor of fine arts, Bawa received the Early Career Achievement in Scholarship/Creative Activities from WSU Vancouver in 2013.

== Notable exhibitions ==
=== The Scaffold Series ===
One of Bawa's ongoing projects, The Scaffold Series, uses painted scaffolds to create large sculptural interventions.

In 2026, Bawa installed Blue Scaffolds in Zbayul, as part of the sā Ladakh Biennale. Bawa's scaffold installation was located in the village of Henasku, a village in the Himalayas at an altitude of approximately 3,875 meters.

In 2024, Bawa installed two iterations in this series. Scaffolds by the Sea was installed as part of the 26th edition of Sculpture by the Sea in Sydney, Australia. Bawa's A Pink Scaffold in a Pink City was exhibited as part of The Sculpture Park at Madhavendra Palace, Nahargarh Fort, Jaipur, India.

In 2019, Bawa installed A Pink Scaffold in the Rann in the Rann of Kutch, a large salt desert in India.

In 2016, Bawa's work was included in the Disjecta Art Center's 2016 Portland Biennial, curated by Michelle Grabner. Bawa created a large golden scaffold that was installed in the vacant Astor Hotel in Astoria, Oregon, accompanied by audio recordings of construction.

=== A Brutal Affair ===
Another ongoing project, A Brutal Affair, concentrates on Brutalist architecture around the world. Drawings and prints in this series have been exhibited at several galleries including the Center for Contemporary Art & Culture at the Pacific Northwest College of Art (PNCA) in Portland, Oregon and the Blueprint 12 gallery in New Delhi, India.

=== Other work ===
In 2018, Bawa had a solo exhibition of drawings and prints of the Portland Veterans Memorial Coliseum at the Portland Art Museum, as part of the APEX series curated by Grace Kook-Anderson. She had a concurrent exhibition at Ampersand Gallery that culminated in the publication of an artist's book.

In 2017 Bawa exhibited Parallel Faults at Los Angeles Valley College in Valley Glen, California

Between 2014 and 2015, Bawa showed her project Aqua Mapping in the Whitebox Gallery in Portland, Oregon and Saltworks Gallery in Atlanta, Georgia.

In 2012, Bawa exhibited a large scale, site-specific installation called At Owner's Risk at Suyama Space in Seattle, Washington, that responded to the current and historical uses of the space: an architecture firm, an auto body shop, and a livery stable.

In 2009, Bawa's show Mathesis: dub, dub dub, was exhibited at Gallery Maskara, in Mumbai, India

== Personal life ==
Bawa was born in Ootacamund, India. She lives and works in Portland, Oregon, also frequently spending time in New Delhi.
