= MK Guth =

American artist (born 1963)

MK Guth (born 1963) is an installation artist from Portland, Oregon, United States, whose work engages ritual and site of social interaction. She has exhibited nationally and internationally at museums, galleries, and festivals including the Whitney Museum of American Art, the Yerba Buena Center for the Arts, the Swiss Institute, White Columns, and the Melbourne International Arts Festival among others. She is the recipient of the Betty Bowen Special Recognition Award and the Ford Family Foundation Fellowship.

== Career ==
Guth was educated at University of Madison, Wisconsin, graduating in sociology. She obtained a Master of Fine Arts degree at New York University.

She first came to international attention for her work at the Whitney Biennial in 2008, which the New York Times described as "sweet, New Agey expansiveness that is atypical for this year's hermetic, uningratiating show". Her installation, entitled "Ties of Protection and Safe Keeping" asked visitors to record what was most dear to them on scraps of cloth, which were then woven into the sculpture. The work was based loosely on the tale of Rapunzel. It expanded in size three-fold during the event, eventually totalling 500 feet.

During a 20-day residency at the Cosmopolitan P3 Studio, Las Vegas in 2011, Guth created a similar work of braided art (the third and final in her braided series) that stretched for 200 feet covering two rooms.

In 2012 Guth created installations entitled "When Nothing Else Subsists, Smell and Taste Remain" and "Taste and Smell Remain" at The Art Gym, Lake Oswego, Oregon, where she used food as a vehicle for triggering memories and emotions. To accompany the exhibition "When Nothing Else Subsists, Smell and Taste Remain", Marylhurst University published a 150-page text that addresses many of Guth's recent bodies of participatory work including "Red Shoe Delivery Service", "Lenticulars", "Braids", and "Knots and Networks".

Guth has exhibited at the Melbourne International Arts Festival and the Nottdance Festival, England as well as venues across the USA. She is a faculty member at the Pacific Northwest College of Art in Portland.

== Exhibitions ==
=== Solo exhibitions ===
2016: Shout, Recount, Get Drunk, Cristin Tierney Gallery, New York, NY

2016: This Fable is Intended for You: A Work Energy Principle, Elizabeth Leach Gallery, Portland, OR

2014: Advice Station, Aqua Miami Basel, Miami FL

2014: MK Guth, Gallery Pfeister, Gudhjem, Denmark

2012: When Nothing Else Subsists, Smell and Taste Remain, Marylhurst Art Gym, Lake Oswego, OR

2011: Best Wishes, P3 Studio, Cosmopolitan Resort, Las Vegas, NV

=== Group exhibitions ===
2016: In Scene, Schneider Museum of Art, Ashland, OR

2015: Andy Warhol to Kara Walker: Picturing the Iconic, Art Museum of Sonoma, Santa Rose, CA

2014: Memory Palace, Center for Contemporary Arts, Cincinnati, OH

2008: Whitney Biennial, The Whitney Museum of American Art, New York, NY
