= Tannaz =

Tannaz (Persian: طناز; Arabic: تناز) is a feminine given name of Persian origins.

People with this name include:

- Tannaz Farsi (born 1974), Iranian-born American visual artist and teacher
- Tannaz Irani (born 1971), Indian actress
- Tannaz Tabatabaei (born 1983), Iranian actress
