= Oregon Contemporary =

Art Center in Oregon

Oregon Center for Contemporary Art (also known as Oregon Contemporary, formerly Disjecta) is an art center in Portland, Oregon. It is home to the Portland Biennial since 2010, continuing in the tradition of the Portland Art Museum's ended Oregon Biennial.

== Programming ==
Oregon Contemporary heads a number of public programs including the Artists' Biennial, the Curator-in-Residence program, a Special Art on Loan program, and various exhibition programs apart from Curator-in-Residence seasons, such as the Site program which mounts site-specific installations from Pacific Northwest regional artists. Their Platform resource also offers subsidize space rental for local businesses and projects in order to deepen connections with the community.

Oregon Contemporary's Curator in Residence program began in 2011 and is the first of its kind in the region. The model involves the curation and mounting of three exhibitions in a year-long program season, with each exhibition running for up to eight weeks. Curators include home school (2022-23), Lucy Cotter (2021–22), Justin Hoover (2019–20), Suzy Halajian (2018-19), Julia Greenway (2017–18), Michele Fiedler (2016-17), Chiara Giovando (2015–16), Rachel Adams (2014-15), Summer Guthery (2013–14), Josephine Zarkovich (2012–13), and Jenene Nagy (2011-12).

Visual arts programming highlights include solo exhibitions by Natalie Ball, Avantika Bawa, Karl Burkheimer, Tannaz Farsi, Anna Fidler, Chris Fraser, Dan Gilsdorf, Peter Halley, Mark Licari, and Jenene Nagy.

In 2010 (then known as Disjecta), Oregon Contemporary launched the first Portland Biennial. The Biennial, which originated at the Portland Art Museum in 1949, is a major survey of Oregon artists who define and advance the state's contemporary arts landscape. The Portland 2019 Biennial was curated by a group of three regional curators–Yaelle S. Amir, Elisheba Johnson, and Ashley Stull-Meyers. The Biennial received positive reviews particularly for including new, diverse voices and a wider curatorial scope than previous biennials.

Past curators of the Biennial include Cris Moss (2010), Prudence F. Roberts (2012), Amanda Hunt (2014), and Michelle Grabner (2016). The 2024 Biennial was curated by Anuradha Vikram and Jackie Im; the 2026 Biennial is to be curated by TK Smith.

== History ==
Oregon Contemporary, was founded under the name, 'Disjecta' as a non-profit art organization in 2005 with the goals of moving to an expanded 20,000 sf space in North Park Blocks. The plans were launched with a high profile party. Disjecta then moved to the Templeton Building on what is now known as the Burnside Bridgehead.

In 2008, Disjecta announced the public opening of a 20,000 sf facility at 8371 N Interstate in the historic Kenton neighborhood. The center now houses five fully leased artist studios, along with 3,500 square feet of visual exhibition space, a 600 sf performance space, and an open space that houses performances and community events.

In 2016, Disjecta announced the departure of founder, Bryan Suereth, amid some mild controversy. The board hired Blake Shell as executive director in April 2017. On June 14, 2021, Disjecta was officially renamed the Oregon Center for Contemporary Art (or Oregon Contemporary, for short).
