= Red and Black Cafe =

Defunct restaurant in Portland, Oregon, U.S.

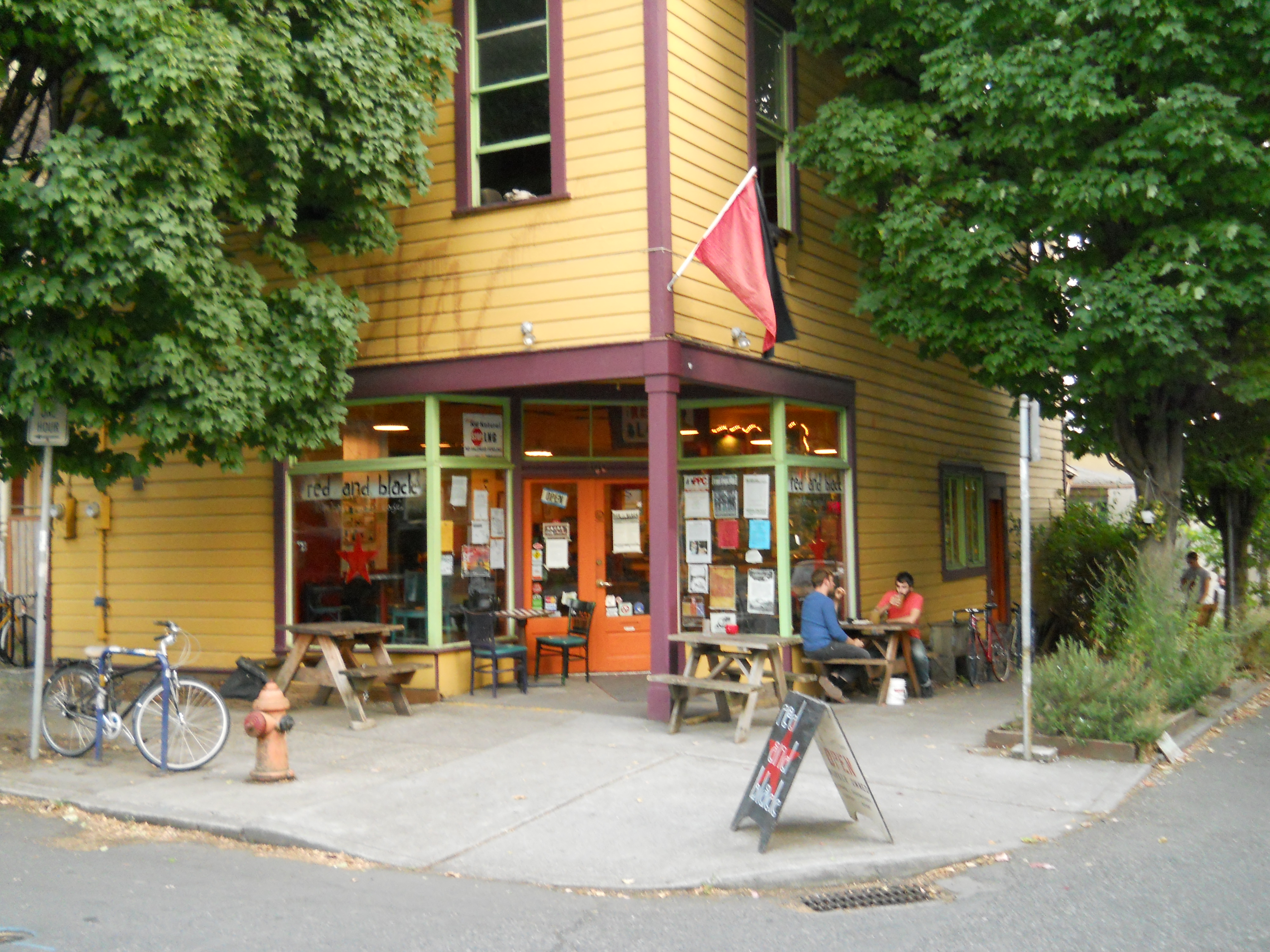
- Red and Black Cafe in 2010
- Interactive map of Red and Black Cafe

Restaurant information
- Established: October 15, 2000
- Closed: March 24, 2015
- Owners: Red and Black Coffee, Inc.
- Food type: Coffee shop
- Location: 2138 SE Division St (2000–2008); 400 SE 12th Ave (2008–2015), Portland, Multnomah County, Oregon, 97214, United States
- Coordinates: 45.5204°N 122.6534°W
- Website: web.archive.org/web/20120217181833/http://www.redandblackcafe.com (via Wayback Machine)

The Red and Black Cafe was a Wobbly, radical, safer space cafe and worker-managed collective located in Portland, Oregon, United States. The cafe served an all-vegan menu and hosted community-based events, including local benefits, political teach-ins and anarchist infoshop-based classes. The cafe also had wireless internet, fair trade organic coffee, organic wines and local microbrews.

== History ==
The collective first opened at 2138 SE Division Street, in Portland's Hosford-Abernethy neighborhood, on October 15, 2000. It was originally opened as the Flying Saucer Cafe, which was purchased with loans from members in the community and the Industrial Workers of the World (IWW). In December 2007, the collective signed a lease at 400 SE 12th Avenue, in the Buckman neighborhood, and opened for business on January 11, 2008.

The Red and Black Cafe was a founding member of the Portland Alliance of Worker Collectives (PAWC) and a member of the United States Federation of Worker Cooperatives (USFWC). Red and Black became an IWW union "closed shop" in October 2009. Effective January 1, 2015, the General Executive Board of the IWW revoked Cooperative Union Shop status. The cafe is highlighted in The Portland Red Guide, a guidebook on radical organizations and people in Portland written by Michael Munk.

On March 24, 2015, the cafe announced plans to close indefinitely.

=== Controversy ===
On May 18, 2010, Red and Black collective member John Langley asked armed Portland Police Bureau Officer James Crooker to leave the cafe, telling him that he violated the "safer space" policies of the collective. Various local and national media sources covered the incident including the Portland Mercury, The Oregonian, and CNN. The situation prompted a boycott of the cafe and the creation of Facebook pages both for the boycott, and in support of the collective with "Boycott the Red and Black Cafe, Portland, OR" and "I'm not Boycotting the Red and Black Cafe, Portland OR". Subsequently, a press conference was held to address concerns over the decision to ask the officer to leave the premises.

Following the controversy, the collective received both verbal and written threats of arson and other violence, but business also increased for the cafe.

The cafe was in local news in 2014 when John Langley called 911, for a man who appeared to be having a heroin overdose, and asked the emergency dispatcher explicitly not to send the police. Langley said if they were to arrive they were not to be allowed inside the cafe.

== Menu ==
The Red and Black Cafe served vegetarian and vegan fare and helped Portland become one of PETA's Most Vegetarian- and Vegan-Friendly Cities in 2010. The cafe purchased produce from Project Grow, an urban farming program that assists developmentally disabled adults. The cafe's menu was predominantly wheat-free and organic.

== See also ==
- List of vegetarian and vegan restaurants
