= Christine McHorse =

Ceramics artist of Navajo descent (1948–2021)

- Born: Christine Nofchissey; December 21, 1948; Morenci, Arizona, U.S.
- Died: February 17, 2021 (aged 72); Santa Fe, New Mexico, U.S.
- Education: Institute of American Indian Arts
- Occupations: Ceramic artist and sculptor

Christine McHorse (December 21, 1948 – February 17, 2021), also known as Christine Nofchissey McHorse, was a Navajo ceramic artist from Santa Fe, New Mexico.

== Early life and education ==
Born Christine Nofchissey on December 21, 1949, in Morenci, Arizona, she was the fifth of nine children of Mark and Ethel Yazzie Nofchissey. McHorse lived off-reservation in her childhood but spent summers in Fluted Rock, Arizona, herding sheep and learning about Navajo oral history from her grandmother, Zonith Bahe.

At age 14, McHorse was introduced to the works of Picasso, Gaudi and Matisse at her boarding school, and she said these artists "opened a whole new world to us" (referring to herself and older sisters who were also attending the school).

From 1963 to 1968, she studied at the Institute of American Indian Arts (IAIA) in Santa Fe, New Mexico, when it was a high school for the arts on the campus of the Santa Fe Indian School. Originally intending to study glassblowing, she instead chose ceramics when the glassblowing major was discontinued the year she arrived, studying with Ralph Pardington (ceramics), Charles Loloma (jewelry), Allan Houser (foundry arts) and Fritz Scholder (design). She met her future husband Joel P. McHorse at IAIA and was influenced by his grandmother, Lena Archuleta of Taos Pueblo, to begin working with ceramics.

Archuleta inspired and instructed McHorse in using the shimmering micaceous clay that was common to the Taos area, and McHorse continued to use that clay in her work.

== Personal life ==
In 1969 McHorse married Joel P. McHorse, a Taos Pueblo Indian and fellow art student whom she met at the Institute of American Indian Arts (IAIA). They had two children, Joel Christopher and Jonathan Thomas, originally living in Taos but later moving to Santa Fe.

McHorse died from complications of COVID-19 in Santa Fe on February 17, 2021, during the COVID-19 pandemic in New Mexico. She was 72 years old.

== Artwork and recognition ==
McHorse's artwork draws inspiration from Navajo, Pueblo, and Anglo cultures. McHorse's pottery was created with a traditional coil-building method and she based her work on traditional Navajo designs and legends, influenced by the Pueblo artistry but her work is nontraditional in appearance.

Much of her work has a signature black surface, created by depriving the clay of oxygen during firing and making her creations popular in contemporary art venues. She preferred to do the firing in the traditional mode but used the electric kiln for pre-firing larger pieces, some up to two feet, to prevent the chance of breakage. She used cedarwood and cottonwood bark as fuel for her outdoor firing. Although commonly Navajo potters have applied boiled pinon-pine pitch to the surface of fired pots to make them waterproof, McHorse used the pitch to increase value contrast in her incised designs.

Her large pottery has the sound of glass when tapped.

McHorse exhibited at Santa Fe Indian Market for 23 years, winning 38 awards for both pottery and sculpture. Her work can be found in the permanent collections of the Heard Museum, the Denver Art Museum, the National Museum of the American Indian, Navajo Nation Museum, and more. McHorse's work is also featured in the catalog Dark Light: The Ceramics of Christine Nofchissey McHorse (Fresco Fine Art Publications).

== Selected awards ==
- 1985: Denver Annual Pottery Show, first prize
- 1990: Museum of Northern Arizona's Navajo Craftsmen Exhibition, Best of Show
- 1994: Santa Fe Indian Market (SFIM), Best in Division, 1994
- 1994, 1987, and 1989: Gallup Inter-Tribal Indian Ceremonial, Gallup, New Mexico, first place,
- 2001: SFIM Best of Classification Award in sculpture, 2001
- 2006: SFIM Challenge Award
- 2012: SFIM Best Sculpture – first time the award had been won by a potter rather than a sculptor

== Solo exhibitions ==
- 1993: Andrea Fisher Fine Pottery, Santa Fe, NM
- 2013–2017: Dark Light: The Ceramics of Christine Nofchissey McHorse, traveling exhibition organized by the CFile Foundation, Nerman Museum of Contemporary Art (2013), Houston Center for Contemporary Craft (2014), Fred Jones Jr. Museum of Art (2014), Navajo Nation Museum, Rockwell Museum of Western Art, IAIA Museum of Contemporary Native Arts (2015), Arizona State Museum (2016), National Museum of the American Indian (2017)

== Group exhibitions ==
- 1972: Taos Pueblo Arts and Crafts Shop, New Mexico (through 1977)
- 1983: Brigham Young University, Provo, Utah
- 1985: Eileen Kremen Gallery, Fullerton, California
- 1985: Eight Northern Artist and Craft Show, San Ildefonso Pueblo, New Mexico
- 1987: Kornbluth Gallery, Fair Lawn, New York
- 1988: anii ánáádaalyaa'íí: Continuity and Innovation in Recent Navajo Art, Wheelwright Museum of the American Indian, Santa Fe, New Mexico
- 1989: Navajo Pottery, Southwest Museum, Los Angeles, California
- 1989: Scripps 45th Ceramics Annual, Lang Art Gallery, Scripps College, Claremont, California
- 1989: From this Earth: Pottery of the Southwest, Museum of Indian Arts and Culture, Museum of New Mexico, Santa Fe
- 1990: The Cutting Edge, traveling exhibit organized by the Museum of American Folk Art, New York; Venues: New Britain Museum of American Art, New Britain, Connecticut; Laguna Art Museum, Laguna Beach, California; Telfair Museum, Savannah, Georgia; Tampa Museum of Art, Tampa, Florida; Whatcom Museum, Bellingham, Washington
- 1994: Honoring the Legacy, Museum of Northern Arizona, Flagstaff
- 1994: Diversity of Expression: New Mexico Folk Art, New Mexico State Capitol/Governor's Gallery, Santa Fe
- 1994: Contemporary Art of the Navajo Nation, traveling exhibit organized by Cedar Rapids (Iowa) Museum of Art; Venues: Albuquerque Museum, Albuquerque, New Mexico; University Art Museum, State University of New York, Albany, New York; Museum of the Southwest, Midland, Texas
- 1996: Contemporary Women Artists of the West, 1946–1996, Karan Ruhlen Gallery, Santa Fe, New Mexico
- 2019: Hearts of Our People: Native Women Artists, Minneapolis Institute of Art, Minneapolis, MN

== Public collections ==
- Denver Museum of Natural History, Colorado
- Museum of Indian Arts & Culture, Santa Fe, New Mexico
- Museum of New Mexico, Santa Fe
- Navajo Nation Museum, Window Rock, Arizona
- School for Advanced Research, Santa Fe
