= Kate Cameron Simmons =

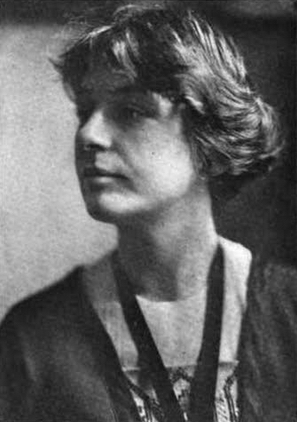
Kate Cameron Simmons, from a 1914 publication.

Kate Cameron Simmons (1880 — April 9, 1978), later known as Kate C. S. Cornell, was an American artist and arts educator. She was the first teacher hired by the Pacific Northwest College of Art when it was organized in 1909.

== Early life ==
Kate Cameron Simmons was born in Saint Thomas, Danish West Indies and raised in Brooklyn, New York, the daughter of diplomat Waldemar Moe Simmons and Mary E. Langthorne Simmons. Her father was also born on Saint Thomas. She graduated from Miss Whitcomb's Seminary for Young Ladies, in Brooklyn. She earned degrees from Columbia University in 1912 and 1915, and from Pratt Institute, with training as both a teacher and an artist.

== Career ==
In 1909, Simmons was chosen by the Portland Art Association to help curator Anna Belle Crocker organize the Art School of Portland (now Pacific Northwest College of Art). Simmons was the school's first teacher. Her salary was underwritten by arts patron Julia Christiansen Hoffman.

Simmons spoke at the 1914 meeting of the Women's Federation of the Photographers Association of America, in Atlanta, Georgia, on the topic of "the art principles that underlie portrait composition". Simmons traveled in Europe with her sister later in 1914. She returned to New York to teach art at Girls' High School until her marriage in 1920. In the 1930s and 1940s she taught high school art and English, in Newton, Massachusetts, where she was also adviser to the Puppeteers Club. She was president of the Newton Women's Club, and was elected to the town's School Committee as a "sticker candidate" in 1930. She resigned from the board in 1934, soon after her husband died.

== Personal life ==
Kate Cameron Simmons married Ward Ireland Cornell in 1920. They lived in Massachusetts and had a son, Ten Broeck Cornell (1924-2008) and a daughter, Mary Langthorne Cornell, who died in infancy in 1922. Kate Cornell was widowed when her husband died in 1934. As Kate C. S. Cornell she donated a rowboat named "Uncas" to the Adirondack Museum. In 1947, she was the victim of an armed home invasion robbery in her home in Newton, Massachusetts.

Kate Cameron Simmons Cornell died in 1978, aged 98, at a nursing home in York, Maine.
