= Annie Evelyn =

Furniture designer and artist

Annie Evelyn is a furniture designer and artist known for works that combine an innovative use of materials with humor. She is co-founder of Table Fights.

== Biography ==
Evelyn received her BFA (1999) and MFA (2007) in furniture design from Rhode Island School of Design (RISD) in Providence, Rhode Island.

Evelyn resides in Penland, North Carolina.

== Work ==
"Creating conceptual dimension through performance"

Evelyn's furniture art looks beyond the functional aspect of furniture furniture maker who is known for her unique sculptural chairs, seating, and objects that act as extensions of the body. She utilizes unexpected materials on the surfaces of her furniture, such as artificial flowers, ceramic tile, cement, graphite, and metal.

“Joy, laughter, and the unexpected have always been at the heart of my work,” said Evelyn in an interview with the American Craft Council.

=== Squishy chairs ===
Evelyn's early work was a series of more traditional wood chairs with geometric patterned seats made from seemingly hard materials. Informally known as the "Squishy" chairs, the seats of the chairs appear to be rigid, but are actually backed with foam so that they respond to pressure like upholstery, by flexing to fit the body. The seats are made out of materials such as cracked concrete, faceted pieces of hardwood, and sticks on end. Chairs from this series received attention after they were shown at the International Contemporary Furniture Fair in New York in 2015. Many of the chair seats were created in collaboration with other artists, such as with the chairs and benches with patterned ceramic tile seats created by Shay Bishop.

=== Static Adornment ===
Breaking away from traditional furniture forms, Evelyn created a series of work titled "Static Adornment", wall mounted structures decorated with ornamented materials such as fake roses, metal scales, and beads, would appear as extensions of the body when people physically engage with the artworks.

== Other public work ==
=== Table Fights ===
Between 2008 and 2012, Evelyn, in collaboration with Shaun Bullens, organized a number of furniture performance public events in which artist-built robotic, automated, and remote controlled tables were set to fight in a ring in front of a live audience. Events were held in New York, Boston, and Providence, Rhode Island.

=== Beasts of the Southern Wild ===
Evelyn received Associate Producer credit for her work on the 2012 film Beasts of the Southern Wild filmed in Louisiana. She worked in casting and in the art department as an on-site dresser.

== Awards and honors ==
- Distinguished Artist Series, James Renwick Alliance (2020)
- The Furniture Society's EFASO Grant awarded (2020)
- Wornick Distinguished Visiting Professor California College of the Arts (2019)
- Finalist, Burke Prize for American studio crafts from the Museum of Arts and Design (2018)
- Windgate Fellowship Artist in residence at University of Wisconsin-Madison (2018)
- John D. Mineck Furniture Fellowship (2016)
- Artist in Residence at Penland School of Crafts (2014–2017)

== Exhibitions ==
Evelyn's solo exhibitions include:

- Annie Evelyn: Multiple Impressions, Houston Center for Contemporary Craft, Houston, TX (2017)

Selected group exhibitions include:

- Making a Seat at the Table: Women Transform Woodworking, The Center for Art in Wood, Philadelphia, PA (2019)
