= Roseburg Forest Products =

Wood products company in Oregon, U.S.

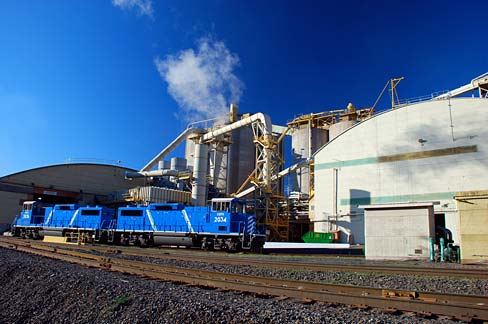
- A Roseburg lumber mill in Douglas County
- Type: Private
- Industry: Forest products
- Founded: 1936; 90 years ago in Roseburg, Oregon, United States
- Founder: Kenneth W. Ford
- Website: www.roseburg.com

Roseburg Forest Products is a privately owned forest products company based in Springfield, Oregon. Founded in 1936, the company had approximately 3,000 employees and revenues of nearly US$1 billion in 2012. Roseburg Forest Products operates mills throughout Western Oregon, and continues to be held by the founding Ford family.

== History ==
The company was founded by Kenneth W. Ford in 1936 as Roseburg Lumber in Roseburg, Oregon. In 1979, it acquired 323,000 acres of California forest land from Kimberly-Clark. In the early 1980s it was renamed to Roseburg Forest Products. In 1987, Roseburg acquired California timberland from Diamond International.

It sold off about 45,000 acres (18,000 ha) of timberlands to Sierra Pacific Industries in Northern California in 2004.

In 2010, the company had about 3,000 employees and annual revenues of about $840 million.

In 2012, revenues were about $991 million, and with approximately 3,000 employees making it the fifth largest private company in Oregon.

In August 2014, Roseburg Forest Products received an investment from United Fund Advisors of $10 million.

In 2017, Roseburg Forest Products sold its California forests to New Forests.

== See also ==
- Hallie Ford
