= Kenneth W. Ford (businessman) =

American businessman

- Born: Kenneth W. Ford; August 4, 1908; Asotin, Washington, U.S.
- Died: February 8, 1997 (aged 88)
- Occupation: Businessman
- Known for: Founder of Roseburg Forest Products
- Spouse: Hallie Ford

Kenneth W. Ford (August 4, 1908 – February 8, 1997) was an American businessman and lumber mill owner from Asotin, Washington, who founded Roseburg Forest Products in 1936. In 2017, his family was the 12th largest private landowner in the United States, owning 783,000 acres in the Pacific Northwest, North Carolina and Virginia.

== Early life ==
Ford was born in Asotin, Washington, a small farming community on the Snake River. His father was a sawmill operator who later moved the family to Lebanon, Oregon. Ford originally wanted to operate a dairy farm but, after working for his father, he decided on the lumber business. He graduated from high school in 1926 and completed a term at Oregon State University. He met Hallie Brown and married her in 1935.

== Career ==
In 1936, Ford built a sawmill with salvaged equipment in Roseburg, Oregon. With 25 employees, he established the Roseburg Lumber Company, known today as Roseburg Forest Products. During the first year of production, Roseburg Lumber produced "30,000 board feet of lumber per day" for a small profit. In 1953, Ford recognized the potential of plywood and built many plywood plants. In the 1960s, there was high demand in Japan's paper industry for wood chips leading Ford to build a long-term partnership with the OJI Paper Company of Japan.

Ford was known for his philanthropy. In 1957, Kenneth and Hallie Ford established the Ford Family Foundation, one of the largest charitable organizations in Oregon.

== Death ==
Ford died on February 8, 1997, at the age of 88.

In 2017, after his family heirs purchased 158,000 acres of timberland in North Carolina and Virginia, the family became the 12th largest private landowners in the United States, owning a total of 783,000 acres in the Pacific Northwest, North Carolina and Virginia.
