= Cris Moss =

Multimedia artist

Cris Moss is a curator and multimedia artist based in Portland, Oregon.

Currently Cris Moss is the director and Curator of the White Box gallery at the University of Oregon's Portland campus. Initially noted for his ongoing series of itinerant donut shop shows in the early aughts. He then became Adjunct Professor of Design, Electronic Media, and Gallery Director at Linfield College. Moss' programming is considered to be some of the most notable in the Portland area. He is also part of the Red Shoe Delivery Service collective.

Moss's work explores the various layers of identity as mediated through culture by employing narratives both scripted and non-scripted. He has exhibited both nationally and internationally, including The Melbourne International Arts Festival, Australia, Nottdance, UK, Display Gallery in Prague, Maccarone Inc. in New York City, Swiss Institute - Contemporary Art in New York City, Elizabeth Leach Gallery Portland, Oregon, Whatcom Art Museum, Bellingham, Washington, and Yellowstone Art Museum, Billings, Montana.

== Education ==
MFA New York University, BFA Pacific Northwest College of Art

== Shows ==
RE: Dudes Night Out
