= Laura Fritz =

American installation artist

Laura Fritz, is a Portland, Oregon based installation artist who incorporates sculpture, light and video.

Fritz is noted for her immersive science lab environments. Originally trained as a painter in Iowa, since showing at Pacific Northwest College of Art in 2000 Fritz has been practicing as an installation artist utilizing custom furniture, cast forms, light and space. Though she's been hailed as one of "the most exciting video artists in the country" in the company of other noted Portland residents Miranda July, Matt McCormick and Harrell Fletcher, Fritz's work differs as she creates video objects like Transposition (2005) or installations like Interspace (2008), both of which featured the shadows of animals that appear to inhabit a constructed, minimalist space. Other exhibitions like Intrus (2010) and Caseworks 13 (2007) at Reed College drew critical attention without video, instead using light like a material for sculpture. In 2007, Fritz was awarded one of the coveted NAAU stipend shows. The resulting show Evident (2009) received much praise among critics. In an exposé on the surge in the Portland art scene's recent rise in prominence Peter Plagens singled her work out as, "Ms. Fritz's 'Entorus' comprises mostly abstract—and, at first, barely perceptible—images projected on the walls and floor of a darkened room temporarily set aside in an office-building basement. It was one of two truly memorable artworks I saw during my brief tour. If you think that's skimpy, remember that these days a stroll through New York's Chelsea gallery district probably wouldn't yield much more."

== Exhibitions and press ==
Laura Fritz has exhibited at the Des Moines Art Center, Reed College, Aljira Center for Contemporary Art, Soil Art Gallery, Pacific Northwest College of Art, the Barrett Art Center, Portland Art Museum, Jordan Schnitzer Museum of Art and the New American Art Union. Fritz was named as a 2014 Fellow in the visual arts by the Oregon Arts Commission.

A favorite of critics, her work frequently provokes a strong response such as, "...This stressing of anti-narrative opens up the possibility of uncertainty, a more active intellectual state, the space of change....She knows where the edges are, liminal territories with room to move. She puts into service a series of challenges in identifying, consuming and silencing the art object." In 2021 she was a Visiting Artist for the University of Oregon's School of Visual Arts in 2021 and as part of that program delivered a talk titled, "The Mechanisms of Uncertainty" via Zoom during the COVID-19 Pandemic.

== Background ==
Originally from Chicago she studied art at Drake University with Joe Biel and Jules Kirschenbaum whose figurative style she distanced herself from, instead focusing on Donald Judd and Eva Hesse for their perceptual and material qualities. The filmmakers, Alfred Hitchcock and David Lynch are also often brought up when discussing her work.
