= Phyllis Yes =

American artist and playwright

Phyllis Yes Artist and playwright
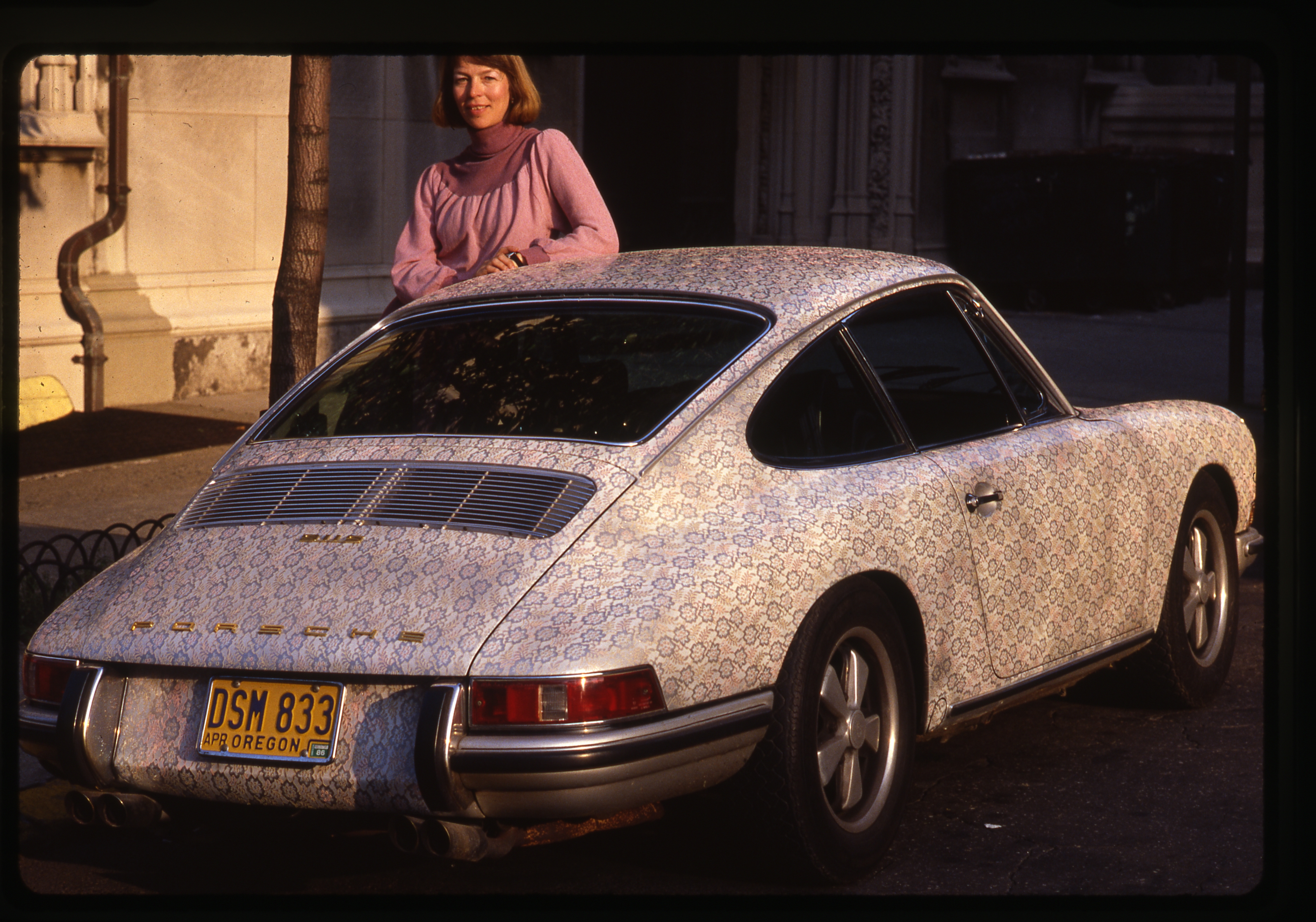
- Yes with her lace-painted Porsche entitled "PorShe"
- Born: Phyllis Dankers; 1941 (age 84–85); Red Wing, Minnesota, United States
- Known for: Painting; Contemporary Art; Drama

Phyllis Yes (born 1941) is an Oregon-based artist and playwright. Her artistic media range from works on painted canvas to furniture, clothing, and jewelry. She is known for her works that “feminize” objects usually associated with a stereotypically male domain, such as machine guns, hard hats, and hammers. Among her best-known artworks are “Paint Can with Brush,” which appears in Tools as Art, a book about the Hechinger Collection, published in 1996 and her epaulette jewelry, which applies “feminine” lace details to the epaulette, a shoulder adornment that traditionally symbolizes military prowess. In 1984 she produced her controversial and widely noted “Por She,” a silver 1967 Porsche 911-S, whose body she painstakingly painted in highly tactile pink and flesh-toned lace rosettes. She exhibited it at the Bernice Steinbaum Gallery in New York in 1984 and drove it across the United States as a traveling exhibition in 1985. In 2016, she wrote her first play, Good Morning Miss America, which began its first theatrical run at CoHo Theatre in Portland, Oregon in March 2018. The play had its New York off-Broadway premiere at Theatre 80 in October 2019. Her exhibition of paintings, "Dusty...at Home" appeared at the Water Tower in Portland, Oregon in June 2024. Her work most recently appeared in the Portland Art Museum's "Nine Women Artists," June 26, 2026 to January 31, 2027.

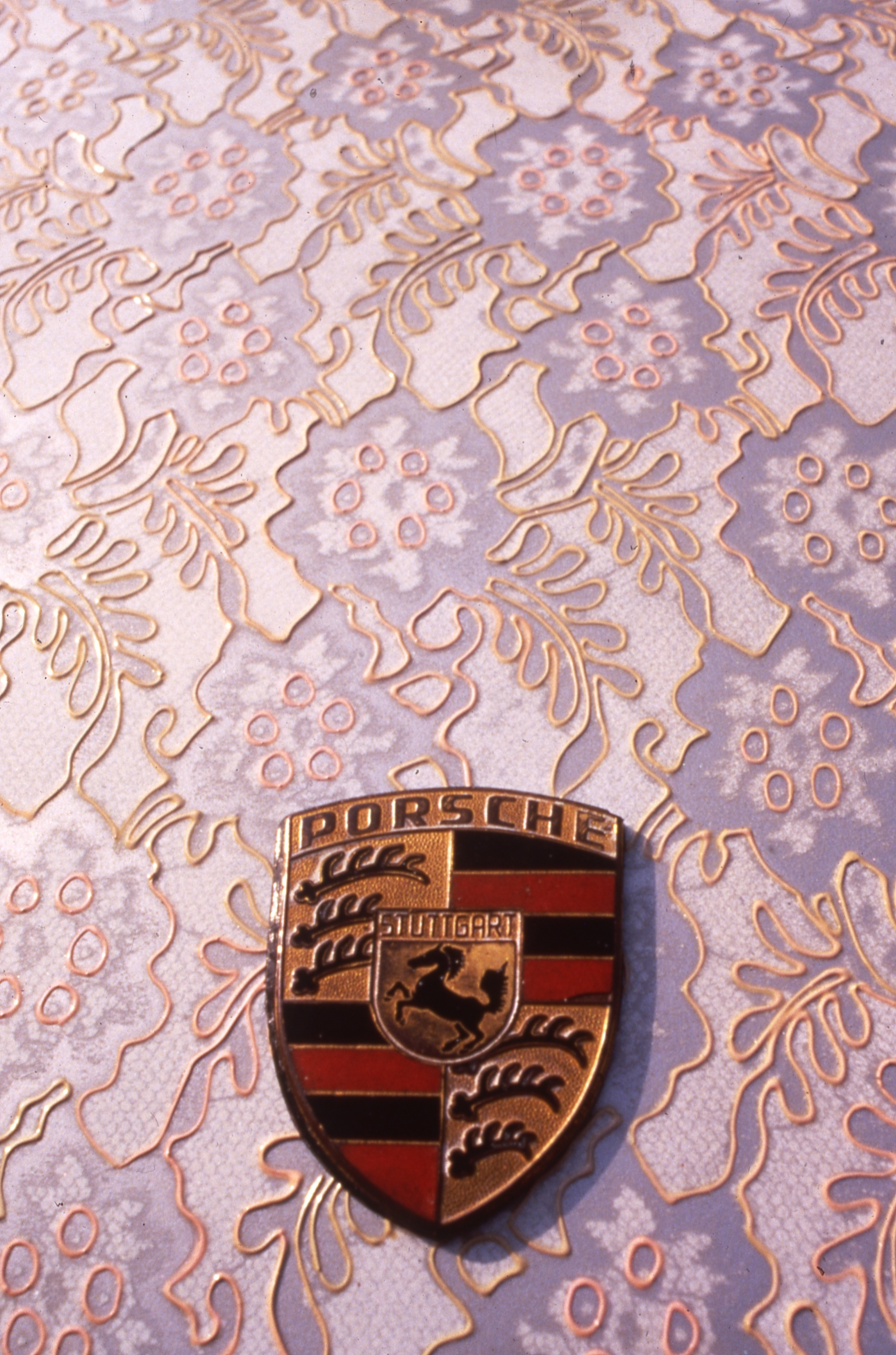
Hood detail on "PorShe"

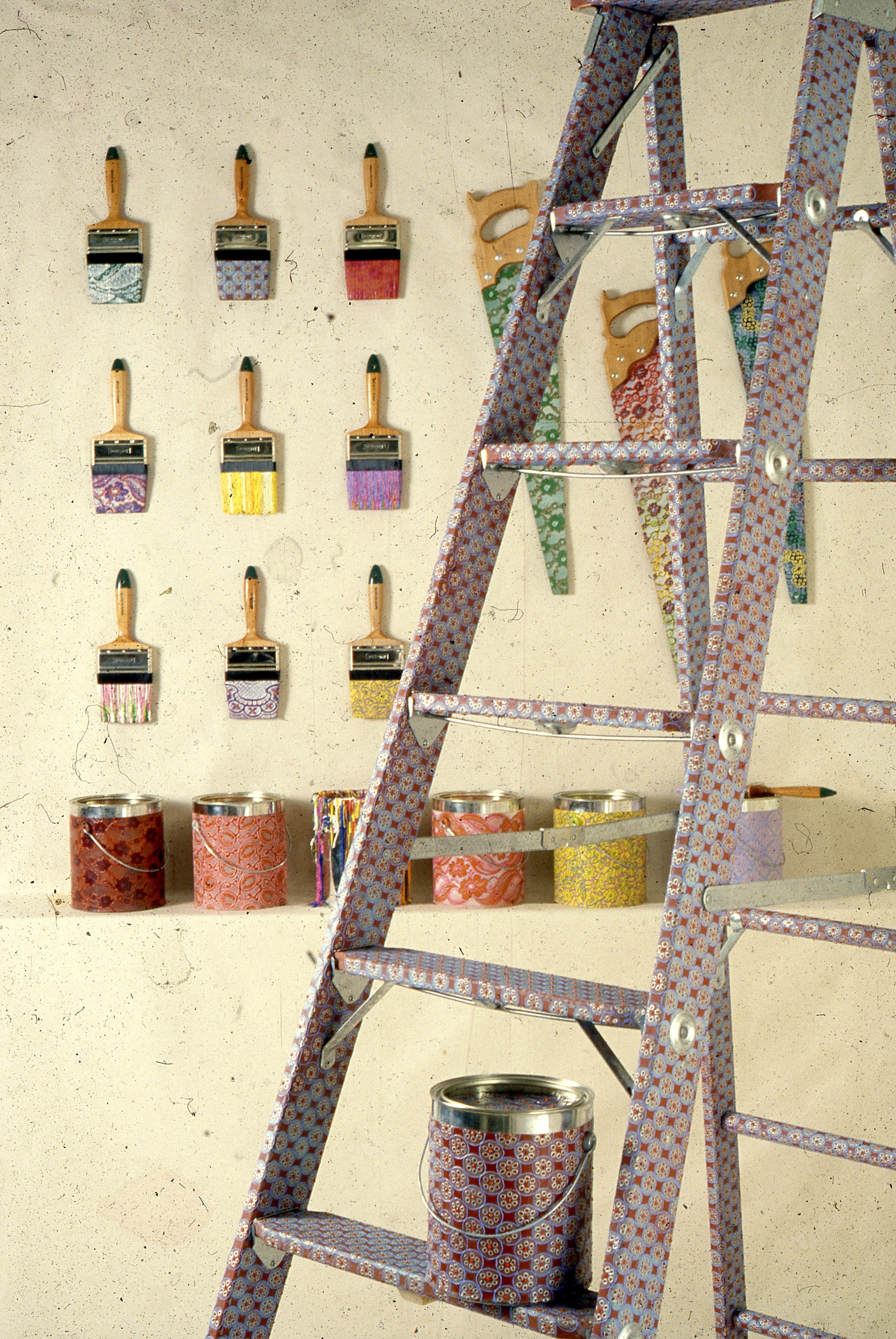
Installation of lace-painted ladder and paint buckets at the Portland Art Museum in Portland, Oregon

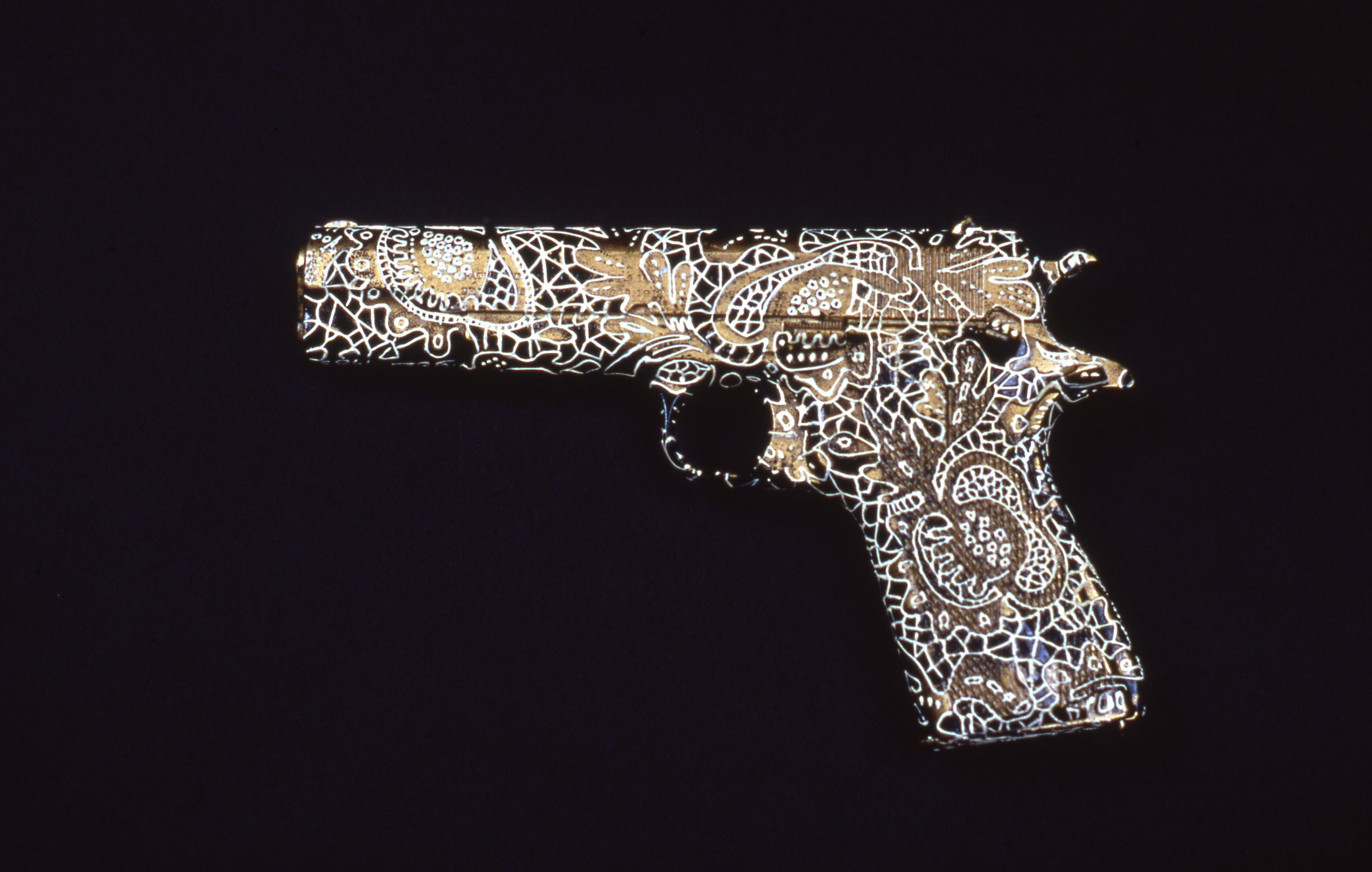
Lace-painted hand gun entitled "Mrs. Johnson's Gun"

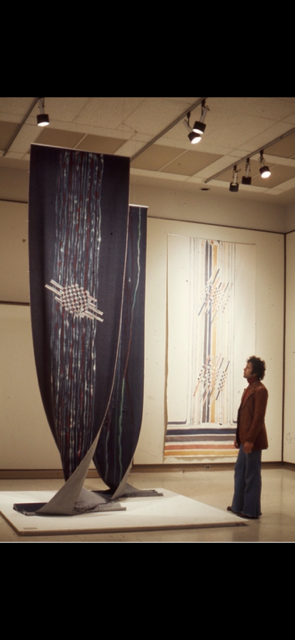
Phyllis Yes early 1970s artwork at Seattle Art Museum; sculptor Clint Brown looks on.

== Key influences ==
Phyllis Yes's interest in socially prescribed gender roles dates to her youth, when she realized that her elderly neighbor was helpless to care for himself after his wife died. She noted, “He didn’t know how to use the dishwasher, the can opener...If it had been the wife who had survived, she probably wouldn’t have known how to find the fuse box.” In her mid-20s, when she was a U.S. Peace Corps volunteer teaching art in northeastern Brazil, she encountered Brazilian gender roles that were different from those she grew up with, such as women who smoked pipes and men who sold fabrics. The experience heightened her awareness that cultures vary widely in their perceptions of “feminine” and “masculine” traits and artifacts. Yes's key artistic influences include the sculptor Louise Nevelson, as well as feminist artists Judy Chicago and Miriam Schapiro, who urged other women artists “to discover personal imagery and imagery that might honor the neglected and unfairly denigrated women’s decorative and domestic arts of the past.” This impulse influenced Yes's “highly praised” paintings of lace in the 1970s and 1980s.

== Early life ==
Phyllis Yes was born in Red Wing, Minnesota, in 1941 and grew up in Austin, Minnesota. She earned a B.A. in art from Luther College in Decorah, Iowa. She earned an M.A. in art from the University of Minnesota and a Ph.D. in art from the University of Oregon in 1978. Upon earning her Ph.D. she dropped her former husband's surname and replaced it with “Yes” so that she might be addressed as “Dr. Yes.”

== Career ==
Phyllis Yes taught art at Federal University of Ceará, Brazil, the Oregon College of Education (now Western Oregon University) in Monmouth, Oregon, and Oregon State University in Corvallis, Oregon, before becoming a professor of art at Lewis & Clark College in Portland, Oregon, in 1978. In 1987 she traveled to Bali and New Guinea on a National Endowment for the Arts grant to study gender-related art forms. She served as Chair of the Art Department and Dean of Arts & Humanities at Lewis & Clark College and became a professor emerita of art, painting, and drawing in 1998. Her work has appeared in more than 150 exhibitions. In 2016, at age 75, she wrote her first play, Good Morning Miss America, which had its theatrical debut in Portland, Oregon in 2018, and its New York premiere in 2019. Her most recent exhibitions opened at The Water Tower in Portland, Oregon ("Dusty...at Home"), the Lakewood Center for the Arts in Lake Oswego, Oregon, both in June 2024, and the Portland Art Museum, June 26, 2026 to January 31, 2027. She lives in Portland, Oregon.

== Accomplishments ==
- Associate Professor of art, Lewis and Clark CollegeTuby S., Heidi (September 22, 1983). "Dr. Yes doesn't know the definition of can't". google news archive. Boca Raton News.
- Name On Portland Walk of Heroines Blosser *, Susan Sokol. "Phyllis A. Yes". Portlands Walk of Heroines. Portland state.
- Selected for Art in the Embassies Programme."PHYLLIS YES". Dept. of State Art in the Embassies. U.S. State Department.
- First play, Good Morning, Miss America, produced in Portland, Oregon and New York City. Of the subject matter, how families care for aging elders, one critic observed, "The play navigates this terrain masterfully."
- Her 2024 exhibitions include a solo retrospective at Lakewood Center for the Arts, Lake Oswego, Oregon, and "Dusty...at Home" at The Water Tower in Portland, Oregon. Its depictions of a nude man doing housework had to be moved to The Water Tower after a church which had agreed to exhibit them retracted its offer.

== Awards and honors ==
- 2013: People’s Choice Award, 2013 Legends of the Autobahn, Monterey, California
- 1999: Lewis & Clark College Research Grant
- 1994: Phi Kappa Phi Honors Society, Lewis & Clark College, Portland, Oregon
- 1989: Research Grant, Lewis & Clark College
- 1988: Distinguished Alumni Award, Luther College, Decorah, Iowa
- 1987: National Endowment for the Arts Fellowship; Barbara Deming Memorial Fund Grant
- 1986: Oregon Arts Commission Grant
- 1977: Purchase Award and Juror's Award, International Banners, Flags, Kites Exhibit, Seattle, Washington; Juror's Award, Coos National Art Exhibit
- 1976: Award Winner, Mayor's Invitational, Salem, Oregon
- 1973: Levi-Strauss Grant, "Denim as Canvas"
- 1968: Foreign Artist Award, Ministeria de Cultura, Brazil; Special Achievement Awards in Journalism, Dramatics, and Leadership by Association of College Women

== Publications ==
- "History of Lace," Art & Antiques, December 1987, by Phyllis Yes
- "Mike Walsh at Keller Gallery," article, Artweek, May 1978

== Selected exhibitions ==
- 2026-27: "Nine Women Artists," Portland Art Museum, Portland, OR
- 2024: Solo exhibition, "Dusty...at Home," The Water Tower, Portland, OR
- 2024: Solo retrospective, Lakewood Center for the Arts, Lake Oswego, OR
- 2013: Luther College, Decorah, IA
- 2005: Solo exhibition, Lisa Harris Gallery, Seattle, WA
- 2002: Hallie Ford Museum of Art, Willamette University, Salem, OR
- 2001: Calyx magazine 25th Anniversary Exhibit, Corvallis Art Center, Corvallis, Oregon; "Daily Bread," Margo Jacobson Gallery, Portland, OR
- 2000: “Open Walls,” Portland Institute for Contemporary Art, Portland, OR
- 1999: Solo exhibition, Hanson-Howard Gallery, Ashland, OR
- 1996: 15th Anniversary Exhibition, Elizabeth Leach Gallery, Portland, OR; "Essence of Beach" (as David George), Lee Freed Gallery, Lincoln City, OR
- 1994: Solo exhibition, "Enclosures," Elizabeth Leach Gallery, Portland, OR; Solo exhibition, Sandra Walters Gallery, Hong Kong, China
- 1993: Solo exhibition, Nishiazabu Asacloth Gallery, Tokyo, Japan
- 1991: "My Vision," juried group show, Women's Caucus for Art, Washington, D.C; solo exhibition, "Mixed Metaphors," Hishiazabu Asacloth Gallery, Tokyo, Japan
- 1990: Solo exhibition, "Mixed Metaphors," Salishan Gallery, Gleneden Beach, OR
- 1989: "Masques: The Faces of Women," juried exhibition Charles Allis Art Museum Milwaukee, WI; curated exhibition, "Tools," San Francisco Airport, San Francisco, CA
- 1988: "Exotica," group show, Elaine Benson Gallery, Long Island, NY
- 1987: Juried exhibition, Maryhill Museum of Art, Goldendale, WA; "Honored Woman Series," Elizabeth Leach Gallery, Portland, OR; "Epaulettes," Facere Jewelry Art, Seattle, WA
- 1986: Northwest Biennial traveling exhibition, Brooklyn Museum, Brooklyn, NY; "Lace/War," Bernice Steinbaum Gallery, New York, NY
- 1985: "Living Room Show," 14 Sculptors Gallery, New York, New York; "Por She," coast to coast traveling exhibition; "The Big Car Show," Herron School of Art, Indianapolis, IN
- 1984: “Form is Function,” solo exhibition of “Por She”, Bernice Steinbaum Gallery, New York, NY; "Fabric of Ornamentation," Bruce Museum, Greenwich, CT; group show, Virginia Breier Gallery, San Francisco, CA
- 1983: “Highlights in Contemporary Arts,” Bellevue Arts Museum, Bellevue, WA; "Phyllis Yes," Boca Raton Center for the Arts, Boca Raton, Florida
- 1982: "Phyllis Yes," PM and Stein Gallery, New York, NY
- 1981: "Oregon Biennial," Portland Art Museum, Portland, OR
- 1980: Solo exhibition, Kiku Gallery, Seattle, WA
- 1979: "Art of The West," Boise Gallery of Art, Boise, ID
- 1978: Solo exhibition, ceremonial space, State Capitol, Salem, OR; "Recent Works," Contemporary Crafts Gallery, Portland, OR
- 1977: "Contemporary Works on Paper," Woman's Building, Los Angeles, CA
- 1976: “Fiber and Glass,” Seattle Art Museum, Seattle, WA; "Paintings on Denim," University of Oregon Museum of Art, Eugene, OR
- 1975: "Environmental Paintings," Gallery 118, Minneapolis, MN
- 1974: Oregon Annual, Portland Art Museum, Portland, OR

== Notable collections ==
- Binney & Smith Company (now Crayola), Corporate Collection, Easton, Pennsylvania
- Jordan Schnitzer Museum of Art, Eugene, Oregon
- Levi Strauss & Co., San Francisco, California
- Microsoft Gallery, Microsoft Corporation, Redmond, Washington
- Museum of Modern Art Lending Service, New York, New York
- Portland Art Museum Lending Collection, Portland, Oregon
- Portland State University, Professional Building, Portland, Oregon
- Security Pacific National Bank, Los Angeles, California
- United States Embassy, Addis Ababa, Ethiopia
- University of Oregon School of Architecture and Allied Arts, Eugene, Oregon
- University of Washington Medical Center, Seattle, Washington
- Whitworth University, Spokane, Washington
