= Tannaz Farsi =

Iranian-American visual artist

- Born: 1974 (age 51–52); Tehran, Pahlavi Iran
- Education: West Virginia University, Ohio University
- Occupations: Visual artist, educator
- Website: Official website

Tannaz Farsi (born 1974) is an Iranian-born American multidisciplinary visual artist and educator. Farsi is an associate professor of sculpture at the University of Oregon. She lives in Eugene, Oregon.

== Biography ==
Tannaz Farsi was born in 1974 in Tehran, Pahlavi Iran. Farsi received her BFA degree (2004) from West Virginia University; and her MFA degree (2007) from Ohio University.

Farsi has had solo exhibitions at the Linfield Gallery at SculptureCenter (2008); the Barron and Elin Gordon Galleries, Old Dominion University; Ohge Ltd, Seattle (2009); Delaware Center for Contemporary Art (2010); Disjecta (2011); Pitzer College Art Galleries (2013); and Linfield College (2017).

Farsi has had group exhibitions include at 1708 Gallery in Richmond, Virginia; Jordan Schnitzer Museum of Art; Urban Institute of Contemporary Art in Grand Rapids, Michigan; Tacoma Art Museum; Schneider Museum of Art at Southern Oregon University; Gallery Homeland, Portland, Oregon; and the PDX Film Festival. She participated in the 2016 Portland Biennial at Oregon Contemporary.

Farsi has been awarded artist-in-residencies at Djerassi Artists Residency, Ucross Foundation, MacDowell Colony, and the Bemis Center for Contemporary Art. In 2014, she was a Hallie Ford Fellow in the Visual Arts, through the Ford Family Foundation.

In 2019, Farsi was featured in a group exhibit of Iranian-American artists titled, "Part and Parcel" at the San Francisco Arts Commission's main gallery.

== See also ==
- List of Iranian women artists
