= Jeff Jahn =

American curator

- Born: 1970 (age 55–56); Wisconsin
- Known for: Curator; critic; blogger; installation art; photography; musician

Jeff Jahn (born 1970) is a curator, art critic, artist, historian, blogger and composer based in Portland, Oregon, United States. He coined the phrase declaring Portland "the capital of conscience for the United States," in a Portland Tribune op-ed piece, which was then reiterated in The Wall Street Journal.

Jahn's cultural activities in Portland frequently receive attention outside the region from media outlets such as CNN, Art in America, The Art Newspaper, The Wall Street Journal, and ARTnews. Described in the press as "outspoken and provocative", and curatorially as, "a clarion call for Portland's new guard of serious artists—the ones creating a dialog that exceeds the bounds of so-called regional art." He originally took up art criticism when then-Modern Painters editor Karen Wright asked him to contribute to the then-London based magazine in the late 1990s. In 2005, he co-founded PORT, a noted visual art blog.

He also lectures on art history or critiques at Portland Art Museum, University of Oregon, Pacific Northwest College of Art, Portland State University, Oregon College of Art and Craft and Lewis & Clark College. In 2010 he was a juror for the Andy Warhol Art Writing Grants. as well as the 2016 Precipice Fund Awards. From 2002-2008 Jahn served as a board member of the Portland Art Museum's Contemporary Art Council and was elected to the vice president's post for a three-year term from 2005 to 2008. In 2006, he launched the visual arts non-profit Organism, which has hosted the work of artists Jarrett Mitchell Pipilotti Rist, Yoram Wolberger, Weppler & Mahovsky and Hank Willis Thomas. In 2008, he shut down Organism as the scope of his projects fell increasingly outside of its more narrow mission of living artists. One of Jahn's most memorable curatorial projects was a scholarly conference and exhibition dedicated to the work of Donald Judd with Robert Storr as keynote speaker at the University of Oregon's Portland campus. In April 2016 Jahn co-curated Habitats as an extension of his new media art interests for the What Is? Media Conference at the University of Oregon, featuring Lynn Hershman-Leeson, Agatha Haines and Brenna Murphy among many other noted new media artists as well as virtual reality and other large scale installation works.

== Exhibitions ==
As a curator, Jahn exhibited "Play" (2002), "The Best Coast" (2003), "Symbiont Synthetic" (2003), "Fresh Trouble" (2005), "Model Behavior" (2007), "Volume" (2008) and Donald Judd (2010). "Biomass" (2023), was a noted reawakening of the Portland art scene after a long pandemic. Jahn's art has been exhibited in the United States and Germany. Since 2007, his photography, and spatial installations have received increasing attention.

One solo show Eutrophication took place at Pacific Northwest College of Art's Manuel Izquierdo Sculpture Gallery in April 2008. His most recent solo show Vection at the New American Art Union presented installation art and photography and was picked by the Huntington Post as a top show on the West Coast. His installation work was selected for the 10th Northwest Biennial at the Tacoma Art Museum where it was noted by numerous critics. One Seattle critic, Jen Graves, described the work as, "a faux forest canopy made of jagged pieces of plywood that create a small, localized environment of green-tinted shadows where you can hide out to think."

== Publications, reviews and interviews ==
Jahn has been published, reviewed and or interviewed in, Art in America, Art News, CNN, Modern Painters, The Wall Street Journal, Art Critical, NYArts, Clear Cut Press, The Oregonian, Oregon Public Broadcasting, Portland Tribune, Portland Mercury, Willamette Week, The Stranger and Diesel music magazine. As publisher and chief critic of PORT, he prompted Stuart Horodner to state, "In the ecology of Portland he is an important independent player....He's calling for a level of seriousness."

On September 5, 2002, The Oregonian said, "…Jahn's laser focus on the present moment emphasizes one important thing about him: He's the voice of right now." On December 20, 2006 Richard Speer stated, "Jeff Jahn has the smarts to mount quirky conceptual shows by nationally known artists…" The Seattle Post-Intelligencer described "Fresh Trouble" (which included China's Cao Fei) as "impressive."
