= Susan J. Harlan =

German-born American artist and educator (born 1950)

Susan Jordan Harlan (born March 7, 1950) is a German-born American artist and educator.

== Early life and education ==
Harlan was born in Frankfurt, Germany. She travelled through Europe, Asia and the South Pacific with a circus based in Florida for almost a year when she was a young woman.

Harlan was educated at the University of Tennessee, the University of Miami and Hampshire College.

== Career ==
She has worked as an editorial cartoonist for USA Today and as a courtroom artist for CBS and The Washington Post. In 1992, Harlan moved to Portland, Oregon with her husband and son. She teaches in the graduate program at Portland State University.

Her work is held in the collections of the Victoria and Albert Museum, the Art Institute of Chicago, the J. Paul Getty Museum, the National Gallery of Art and the National Museum of Women in the Arts. Although inspired by nature, her art is primarily abstract.
