= Mack McFarland =

American curator of contemporary art

- Education: University of Bergen, Faculty of Fine Art, Music and Design (KMD)
- Occupation: Curator
- Movement: Tactical Media, Photography

Mack McFarland is a curator and artist living in Portland, Oregon. He is the Director of Center for Contemporary Art & Culture at Pacific Northwest College of Art.

As the curator for PNCA, McFarland has worked with several Tactical media artists, including The Yes Men, Critical Art Ensemble, Brian Holmes and Eva & Franco Mattes. McFarland's other projects with PNCA include solo exhibitions with Luc Tuymans, Wangechi Mutu, Joe Sacco, Cauleen Smith, Sandow Birk, James Rosenquist, David Horvitz, Sue Coe, Thomas Zummer, and many others. His work focuses on issues of class, representation, information environments, and phenomenological perception.

In 2006 McFarland teamed with Dennis Nyback in the Portland Portland Institute for Contemporary Art Time Based Art project the Portland That Was.
