= Rachelle Thiewes =

Jeweler and metal artist

- Born: 1952 (age 73–74); Owatonna, Minnesota, U.S.
- Occupations: Jeweler; metal artist

Academic background
- Education: Southern Illinois University; Kent State University

Academic work
- Institutions: University of Texas at El Paso

Rachelle Thiewes (born 1952) is an American jeweler and metal artist based in El Paso, Texas. She was professor of metal arts at the University of Texas at El Paso from 1976 to 2014 and is currently professor emerita.

== Biography ==
Thiewes was born in Owatonna, Minnesota, and attended a private Catholic school, where she derived some inspirations for her work. She received her BA in Art/Metals from Southern Illinois University, Carbondale, and her MFA in Art/Metals from Kent State University. Thiewes began teaching at the University of Texas at El Paso in 1976 and is a current member of the Society of North American Goldsmiths. She also taught a Master class at the Royal College of Art in London in 1995.

== Artwork ==
In the 1980s Thiewes work was largely focused on making the wearer of her jewelry conscious of their body and incorporated kinetic or moving elements. Her more recent work draws direct inspiration from the landscape and her decades-long experience of her home in the Chihuahuan desert. This is reflected in her choice of color palette but also through her use of reflective metals and auto paint on her jewelry. Recent projects by Thiewes have included collaborations and performance work, such as her collaborative book project Beauty.Chaos and traveling show "Air Patterns" with painter Suzi Davidoff. Her work is displayed in many art collections across the world, including The Metropolitan Museum of Art, The American Craft Museum, The Art Institute of Chicago, The Renwick Gallery at the Smithsonian Institution, The National Museums of Scotland, and the Royal College of Art, London.
