= Art blog =

Type of blog that comments on art

An art blog is a common type of blog that comments on art. More recently, as with other types of blogs, some art blogs have taken on 'web 2.0' social networking features. Art blogs that adopt this sort of change can develop to become a source of information on art events (listings and maps), a way to share information and images, or virtual meeting ground.

Art blog entries cover different topics, from art critiques and commentary to insider art world gossip, auction results, art news, personal essays, portfolios, interviews, artists' journals, art marketing advice, and artist biographies. Some artists use art blogs as a form of new media art project.

Art blogs may also serve as a forum to reach out to anybody interested in art – be it painting, sculpture, print making, creative photography, video art, conceptual art, or new media. In this way, they may be visited not only for the practitioners of different forms of art, but also collectors, connoisseurs, and critics.

== Mainstream media ==
In 2011, art critic Brian Sherwin interviewed art critic Mat Gleason of Coagula Art Journal for Faso.com's FineArtViews blog. The interview between Sherwin and Gleason focused on contemporary art criticism and the role of art blogs in present-day art criticism among other issues. Gleason suggested to Sherwin that art blogs and the development of new media have become a "blow" to traditional print art magazines. Gleason and Sherwin also discussed how bloggers form a "pack mentality" based on region and perceived significance.

On 28 April 2009, Art Connect produced an in-depth interview by Peter Cowling for Art Connect and Jessica Palmer of Bioephemera. The interview, titled "It is not Really Bloggers vs. Journalists, You Know," pointed to five trends that were shaping the communication and discussion of art on the internet and that the real picture was much bigger than just the bloggers vs. journalists that had been discussed to date. These five points were:

- Media convergence will continue to improve consumer choice, providing a better match between desire and availability.
- Content producers are just that. Consumers care less about how and where they can get the content they want. What they do consistently care about is the quality of the content and whether the content is produced to their timescales.
- The content producer-to-content consumer relationship is changing. Requests for feedback and further debate have been partially overtaken by things like conversations, and further fragmentation will certainly occur.
- Information technology and systems, provided as commodity (pay-as-you-go) services. Such services range from processing and storage, through to credit card processing and super-fast content delivery.
- The economic downrun.

On 8 January 2009, Regina Hackett, art critic of the Seattle Post-Intelligencer, noted in her article "Art blogs hit Wikipedia" that commercially run, mainstream media-supported art blogs face issues of acceptance among the independent art blogging community.

On 7 January 2009, The Village Voice art critic Martha Schwendener suggests that art blogs have helped shape a more laissez-faire climate for art writing. "Art blogs have created a new, largely unedited, admirably 'unprofessional'—hence, democratic—venue for people to speak their minds, gossip, or theorize about art."

In September 2008, the Brooklyn Rail contributor James Kalm produced an article titled "Virtually Overwhelmed.". A practicing artist and video blogger himself, Kalm says about art blogs, "The art blogosphere is a work in progress, and you’ve got to be vigilant of hidden agendas. As with anything online, take it with a grain of salt. Have fun, speak out, but don’t let it cut too much into your studio time; you might end up in a twelve step-program."

In the November 2007 issue of Art in America, Peter Plagens contributed "Report from the Blogosphere: The New Grass Roots." Plagens convened a round table of veteran art bloggers, who conversed via email on a range of questions, aimed at getting a better understanding of what art blogs were, how they were run, and their relationship with the mainstream media.

In an October 2007 article for Artnet Magazine, critic Charlie Finch suggested that art critiques and reviews by art bloggers are overrated and lengthy, and implied that the art blogging community was overly insular. The article includes several ad hominen arguments against specific art bloggers, and ventures the opinion that art blogs "have no readers".

In the January 2005 issue of Art in America, Raphael Rubinstein mentioned several blogs in the magazine's "Front Page" section, where he penned a brief, annotated survey of 12 art blogs that he found "to be worth regular visits.". Rubinstein opined that "art-related blogs" had not, at the time, become as consequential as blogs in other fields such as poetry or politics.

== Academia ==
In December 2008, the art blog The Dump, where the new-media artist Maurice Benayoun dumped hundreds of undone art projects, was the first to become a doctorate thesis in art and art science in and of itself: Artistic Intentions at Work, Hypothesis for Committing Art Université Pantheon Sorbonne (6 December 2008). This PhD was directed by Prof. Anne-Marie Duguet. Jury: Prof. Hubertus von Amelunxen, Louis Bec, artist, Prof. Derrick de Kerckhove, and Prof. Jean da Silva.

In May 2010, The Dump – Recycling of Thoughts, a contemporary art exhibition curated by Agnieszka Kulazińska at Laznia Art Center (Gdańsk, Poland) presented 9 artists whose works were derived from The Dump blog project list.

== Other coverage ==
Other coverage of art blogs includes interviews of art bloggers, reviews of art blog sites, and recommendations of favorite sites. Art Connect has produced around 90 reviews of art blogs and undertakes interviews with art bloggers. The Courtauld Institute of Art, in London, maintains a list of recommended art blogs. Directories such as Yahoo! Directory and BlogCatalog maintain a list of user-submitted art blogs.

== List of notable art blogs ==
- A Year of Positive Thinking is published by artist and activist Mira Schor, "a cheerful postscript" to her book of essays on art, culture and politics called A Decade of Negative Thinking.
- Art F City, founded by Paddy Johnson, is an officially non-profit art blog that covers new art in New York. At The New York Times, Holland Cotter named AFC as a blog that "combines criticism, reporting, political activism and gossip on an almost-24-hour news cycle."
- The Dump by French new media artist Maurice Benayoun delivers hundreds of undone art projects
- Hyperallergic, founded by the art critic Hrag Vartanian and his husband Veken Gueyikian in October 2009. The site describes itself as a "forum for serious, playful and radical thinking."
- NEWSgrist, maintained by artist Joy Garnett, began in March 2000 as an e-zine devoted to the politics of art and culture in the digital age. For four years, it was distributed entirely by email subscription.
- PORT, co-founded in 2005 by Jennifer Armbrust and Jeff Jahn (who still maintains the site), PORT focuses on critical content related to the Portland art scene. PORT describes itself as "dedicated to catalyzing critical discussion and disseminating information about art as lensed through Portland, Oregon." In the November 2007 Art in America roundtable Plagens described PORT as, "the closest thing to the virtues (paid critics, office help, etc.) of a print art magazine on the Internet....". In 2007, Tyler Green described PORT as, "The undisputed champ of the regional art blogs" on Off Center, the Walker Art Center's blog.
- Two Coats of Paint, founded by Sharon Butler in 2007, is dedicated to contemporary painting and related subjects and received a Creative Capital/Warhol Foundation Arts Writing Grant in 2013–14.
- Wooster Collective was founded in 2001. This site focuses on ephemeral art placed on streets in cities around the world. Updated by Marc and Sara Schiller, the site also offers podcasting with music and interviews featuring street artists.
