= Andy Paiko =

American glass sculptor (born 1977)

Andy Paiko (born September 10, 1977, Woodland, California, United States) is an American glass sculptor. He co-founded Central Coast Glass Artist Studio in 2002, was named Searchlight Artist 2008 by the American Craft Council, and was selected for the Smithsonian American Art Museum and Renwick Gallery's 2012 exhibition 40 under 40: Craft Futures.

== Career ==
Andy Paiko glass.

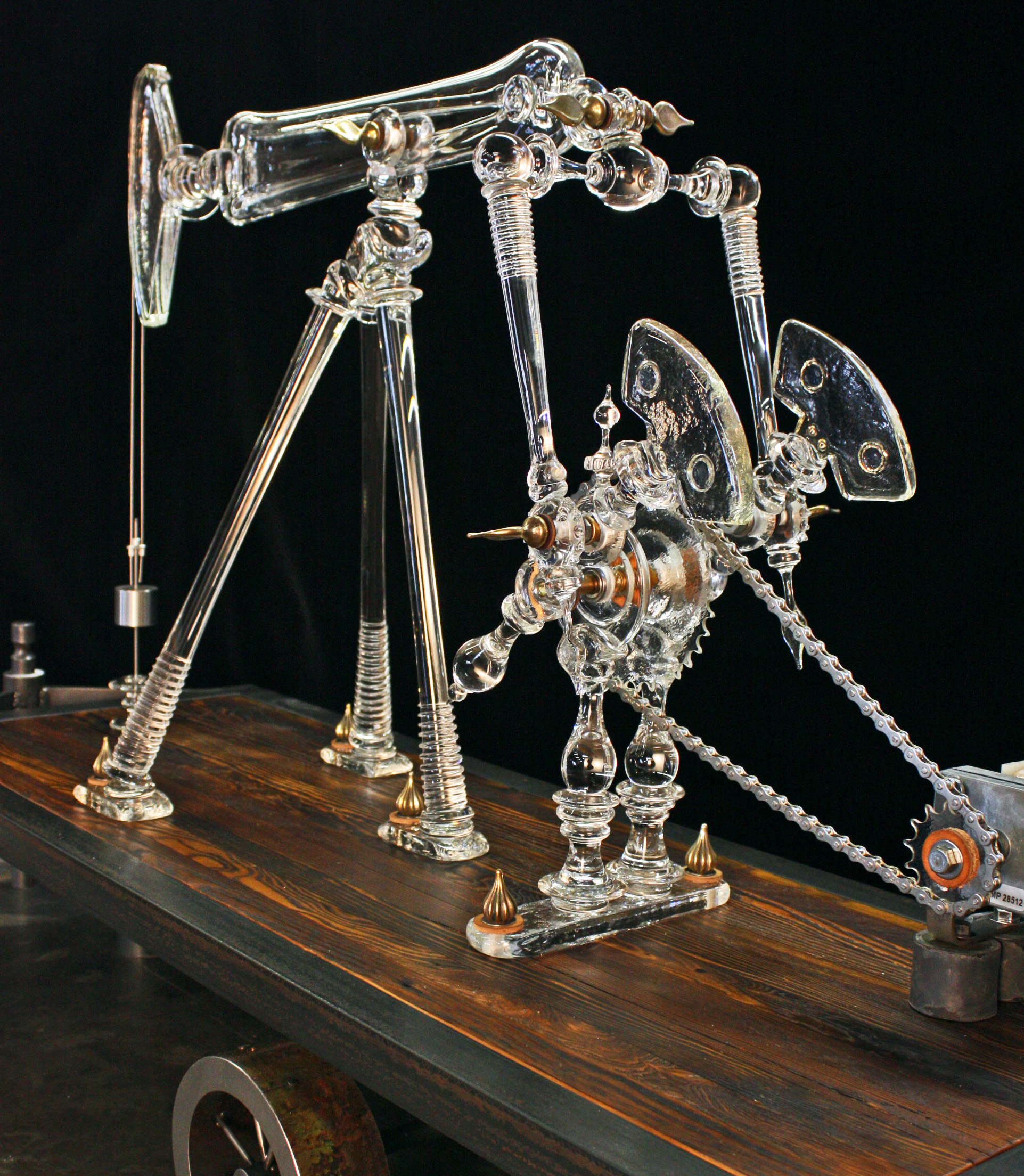
Blown glass electric pump jack

Paiko works without assistants and is largely self-taught. Characteristic works are antiquarian style glass bell jars containing obscure or extravagant artifacts, or sculpted glass celebrations of obsolete technologies reinterpreted, such as a functional seismograph based on a design by Leonardo da Vinci, an actual size, fully operable Spinning Wheel, and an array of 31 automated singing bowls of various sizes, created as a room-sized musical installation in collaboration with composer Ethan Rose. His work was discovered and became abruptly influential through a series of feature layouts in House & Garden, with depictions of Paiko's Absinthe fountain and other glass works amid Victorian ruin. Several of Paiko's works are visible on display in Portland City Hall during scenes of the television series Portlandia episode Mayor is Missing.
