= Project Grow =

Project Grow was an Arts and urban farming program in Portland, Oregon.

It exists at the Port City Development Center in North Portland. It is a program for people with developmental disabilities, and was mentioned in the Oregonian as the only program of its sort in the country.

It was founded in 2009 by Social Practice artist Natasha Wheat.

Under the leadership of Port City Development Center's administration, in June 2012 Project Grow has adopted the mission of the parent organization and no longer operates under the principles it was based on since January 2009. Port City Development Center is a certified vocational rehabilitation facility that offers a variety of tasks for the enrichment of people with developmental disabilities. The program continues to maintain a garden and run an art studio in line with the mission of Port City Development Center.
