= Stephanie Robison =

American artist (born 1976)

- Born: August 5, 1976 (age 50)

Stephanie Robison (born August 5, 1976) is a sculpture artist based in Portland, Oregon.

== Work ==
Her work is exemplified by the post-minimalist use of materials (ala Richard Tuttle only much larger, but smaller than Jessica Stockholder's full room works) in a range of tactically diverse ways, such as stuffed fabric, wood, and marble. The effect recalls surrealism, with undertones of disconnected, fluid anatomy. Her installation Wreaking Ball Cloud appeared in the 9th Northwest Biennial 2009 at the Tacoma Art Museum in Tacoma, Washington. She was regularly featured at the Tilt Gallery in Portland, Oregon. Her work has been selected for several juried exhibitions including the Center on Contemporary Art Annual in Seattle and more recently the 10th International Shoebox Sculpture Exhibition at the University of Hawaii. She is currently a tenured faculty member teaching sculpture at City College of San Francisco.

== Education ==
She received her Masters of Fine Arts in Sculpture from the University of Oregon in 2004.
