= Jenene Nagy =

American installation artist and curator

Jenene Nagy, a native of New York, is a Los Angeles-based installation artist and curator. She received her Master of Fine Arts from the University of Oregon in 2004 and has co-curated the noted Tilt Gallery and Project Space with Joshua West Smith since 2006.

Known for her space-shaping architectural interventions debuted at THE HOOK UP exhibition at the New American Art Union (June 2007), her work has grown exponentially in later shows like False Flat and S/plit in the Portland Art Museum's Apex Program.
