= Hallie Ford =

American business person and philanthropist (1905–2007)

- Born: March 17, 1905; Red Fork, Oklahoma, U.S.
- Died: June 4, 2007 (aged 102); Monmouth, Oregon, U.S.
- Education: East Central University
- Occupation: Philanthropist
- Employer: Roseburg Forest Products
- Spouse: Kenneth W. Ford

Hallie Brown Ford (March 17, 1905 – June 4, 2007) was an American business person and philanthropist. A native of Oklahoma, she acquired her wealth in Oregon through the timber industry. As a philanthropist she made donations to many institutions in Oklahoma and Oregon to support education and the arts. Shortly before her death in 2007, she made a donation of $15 million to the Pacific Northwest College of Art, the largest single donation to any cultural group in Oregon history.

The Hallie Ford Museum of Art and several other institutions at Willamette University and Oregon State University in Oregon are named in her honor, as are several items at her alma mater East Central University in Oklahoma.

== Early life ==
Hallie Brown was born in Red Fork, Oklahoma, on March 17, 1905. At the time it was Indian Territory, with Oklahoma becoming a state in 1907. She attended Beggs High School where she was valedictorian. She worked her way through college at East Central State Normal School (now East Central University) in the town of Ada. There she earned a teaching certificate and a bachelor's degree in 1930. After college she began teaching in Oklahoma.

== Oregon ==
She moved to Lebanon, Oregon, with her parents and began teaching in that area during the Great Depression. She met Kenneth W. Ford there, and the two married in 1935. After their marriage they moved to the Roseburg, Oregon, area where they started and ran the Roseburg Lumber Company (now Roseburg Forest Products Company). They had a daughter, Carmen, and a son, Allyn. In 1957, with her husband, she helped found the charitable organization that became the Ford Family Foundation. In 1959, she worked with artist Harry Widman on a 200-plus piece art exhibit for Oregon's Centennial in Roseburg. In Roseburg she was a civic leader, and was given the First Citizens Award in 1967 by the local chamber of commerce.

== Later years and philanthropy ==
Hallie moved to Salem, Oregon, in 1972. In 1975, she became a member of the board of trustees at Willamette University in Salem. In 1992 her alma mater, East Central University, named her as a distinguished alumni. The Fords' charity created the Ford Scholars Program scholarships for Oregon students in 1993. She then started the Ford Opportunity Scholarship Program in 1995 for single parents. Ford became a lifetime member of the board of trustees at Willamette in 1996, and received the Governor of Oregon's Arts Award for Arts Patronage. That year her charitable foundation became the Ford Family Foundation. Her husband Kenneth died on February 8, 1997. In 2002, she moved to an assisted living facility in Monmouth, Oregon.

In 2006, Ford donated an additional $8 million to Willamette University, the largest single donation in that school's history. In May 2007, Hallie Ford donated $15 million to the Pacific Northwest College of Art, the largest donation in that school's history. The donation would primarily be used for a visiting artists program. This donation to the college was the largest donation to any cultural group in Oregon's history. Also that month she was given the Distinguished Philanthropist Award by East Central University.

Given before her death, but announced after her death was an $8 million donation to Oregon State University, the alma mater of her daughter Carmen Ford Phillips. The gift went toward the Hallie Ford Center for Healthy Children and Families as part of the school's College of Health and Human Sciences.

== Death and legacy ==
Hallie Ford died on June 4, 2007, in Monmouth, Oregon, at the age of 102 after a brief illness. Ford Hall and the Hallie Ford Museum at Willamette University are named in her honor, as is the school's English and literature endowed professorship. At East Central University the Hallie Brown Ford Fine Arts Center and the Hallie Brown Ford Award for Philanthropy honor her legacy at the school where she donated approximately $7 million over the years.
