= Elizabeth Leach Gallery =

Art gallery in Portland, Oregon, U.S.

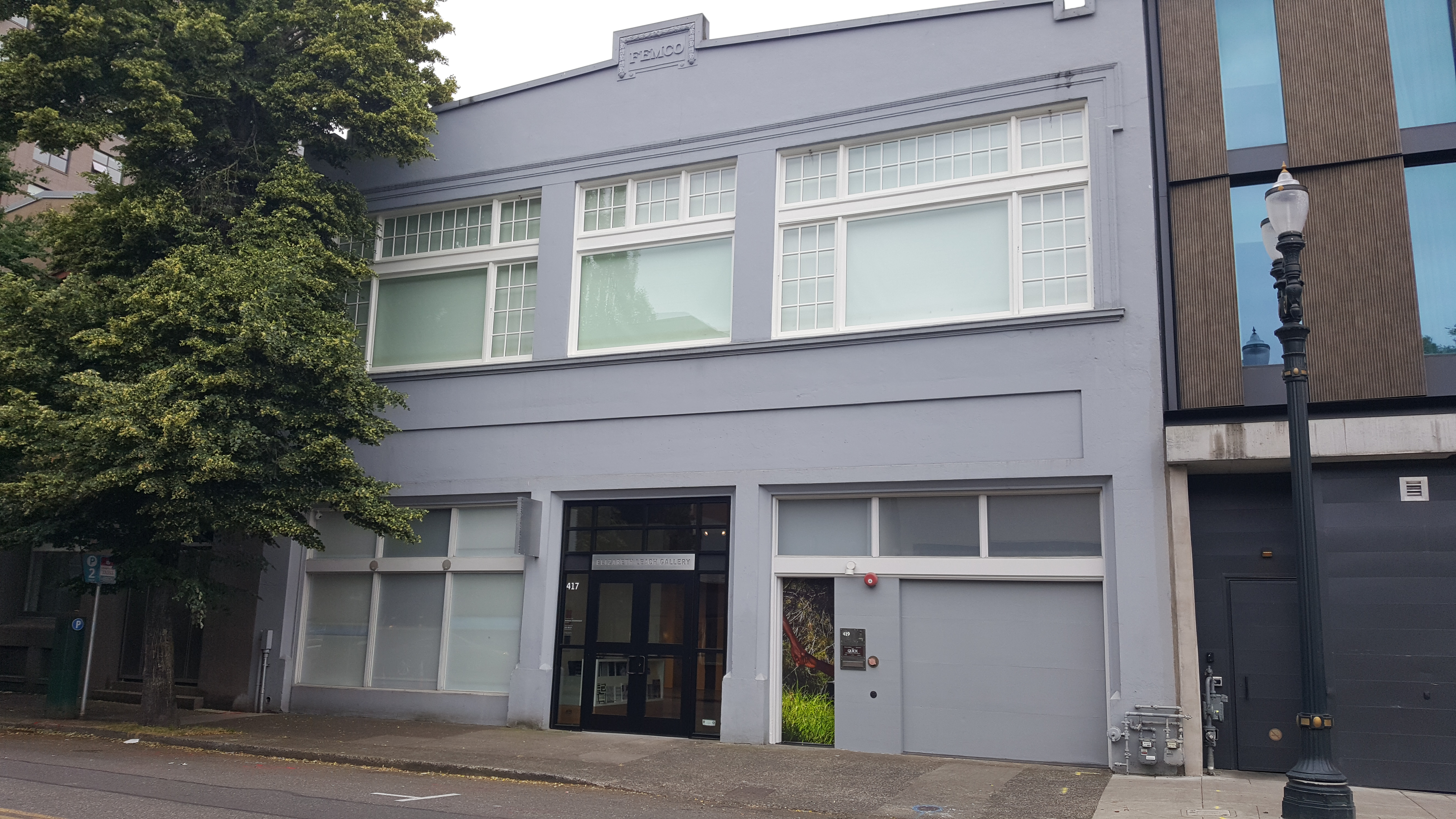
- Exterior, 2022
- Established: 1981
- Location: Portland, Oregon, U.S.
- Coordinates: 45.52613°N 122.68044°W
- Type: Art gallery
- Founder: Elizabeth Leach
- Website: www.elizabethleach.com

The Elizabeth Leach Gallery is a contemporary art gallery in Portland, Oregon's Pearl District that specializes in artists from the Pacific Northwest, although Leach shows other artists. It was established in 1981 by Elizabeth Leach, who is considered a trailblazer in the Portland gallery scene, and is directed by Daniel Peabody and Leach's daughter, Gwendolyn Schrader-Leach.

Leach is the daughter of Palm Beach billionaire Howard H. Leach, former US Ambassador to France under George W. Bush.

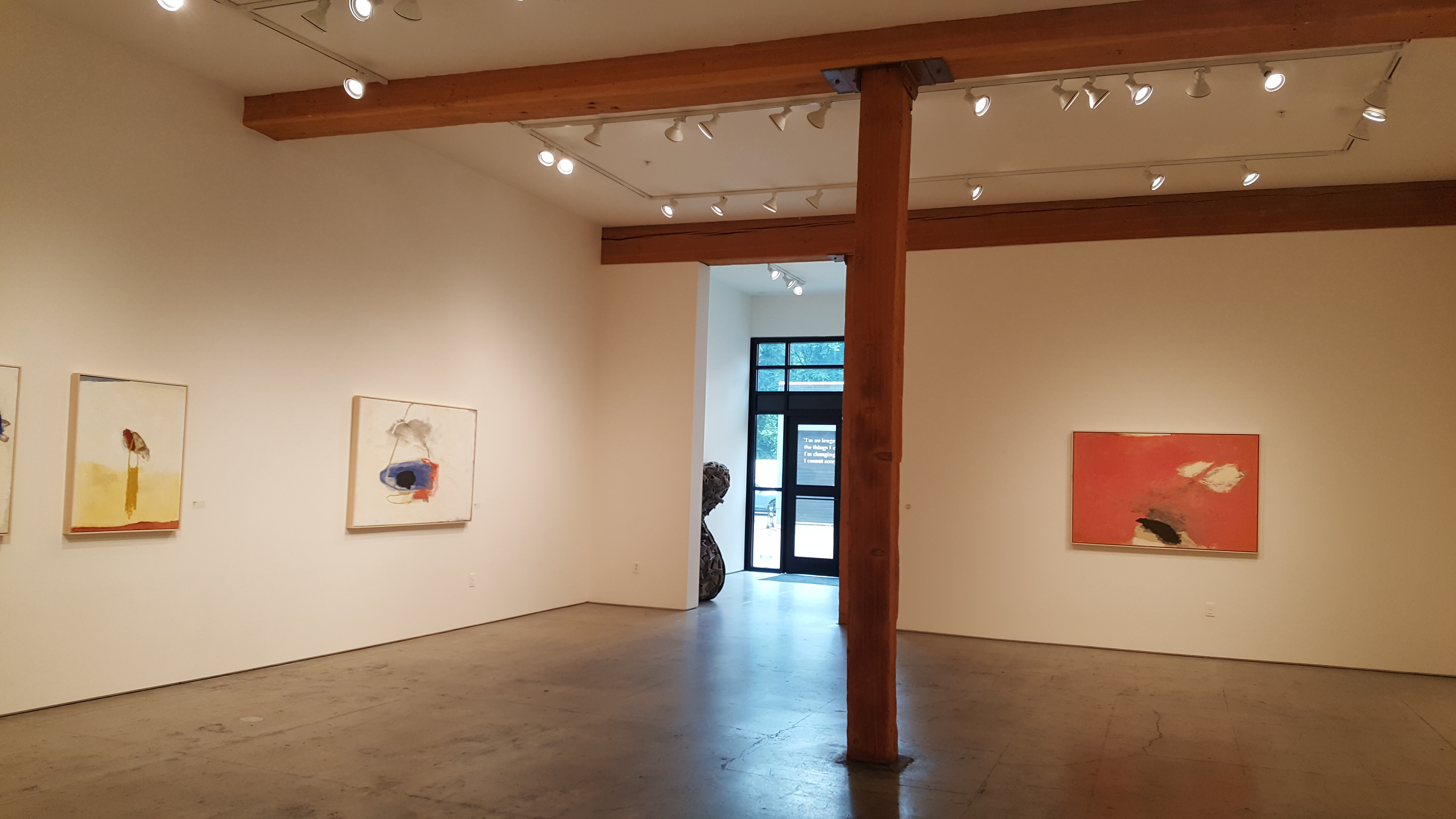
Interior, 2022
