= Pacific Northwest College of Art =

Art school at Willamette University in Portland, Oregon, US

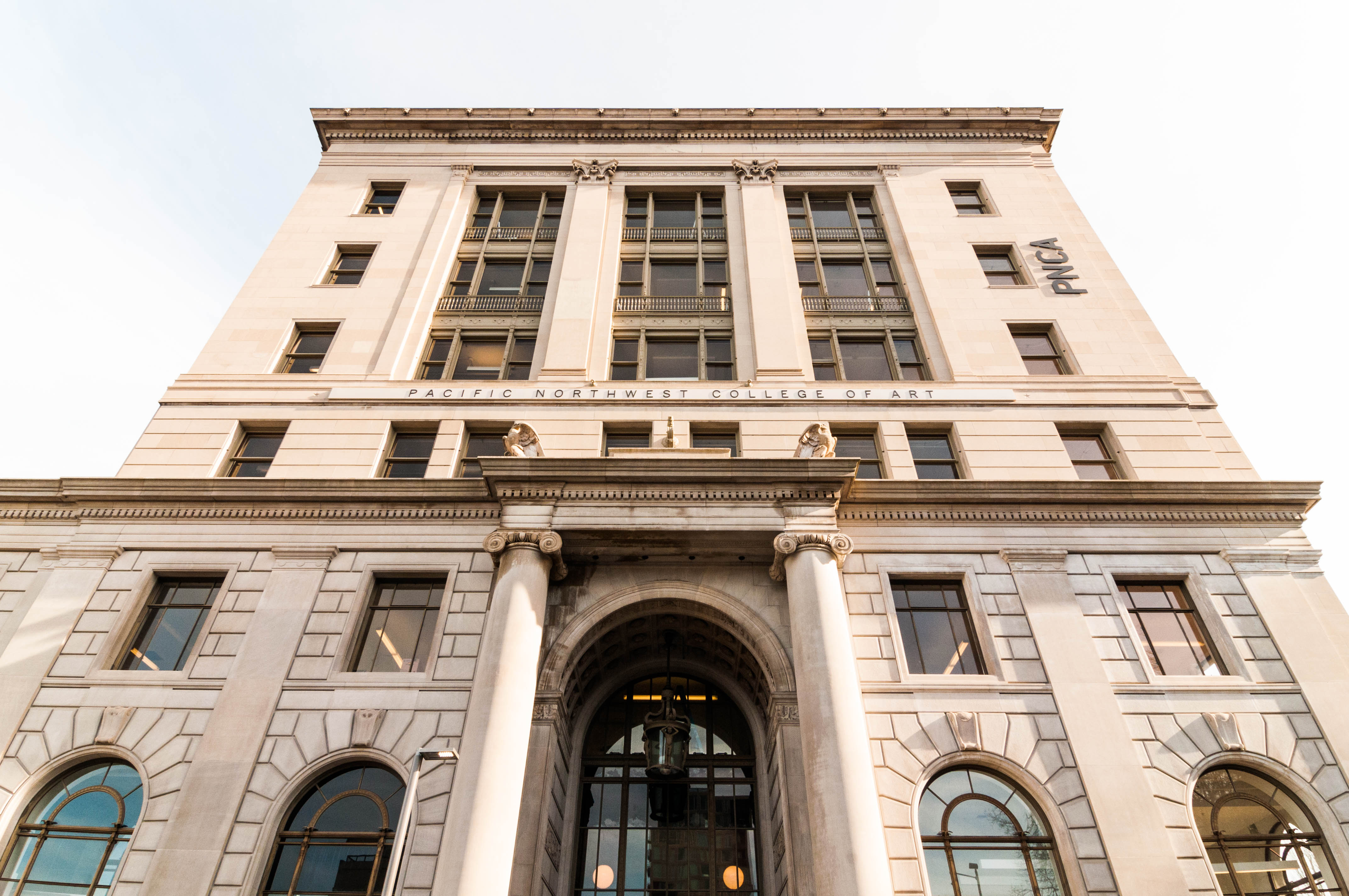
- The 511 Federal Building was built in 1916–18 as a post office and is listed on the National Register of Historic Places. It is now PNCA's main campus, the Arlene and Harold Schnitzer Center for Art and Design.
- Type: Private art school
- Established: 1909
- Parent institution: Willamette University
- Endowment: $14.7 million
- President: David Ellis (interim)
- Dean: Jennifer Gilligan Cole
- Academic staff: 121 (2024)
- Students: 647 (2024)
- Undergraduates: 522 (2024)
- Postgraduates: 125 (2024)
- Other students: 1,400 CE (2016)
- Location: Portland, Oregon, United States; 45.5269°N 122.6781°W
- Campus: Urban
- Colors: Cyan, Magenta, Yellow, and Black
- Mascot: Sloth
- Website: pnca.willamette.edu
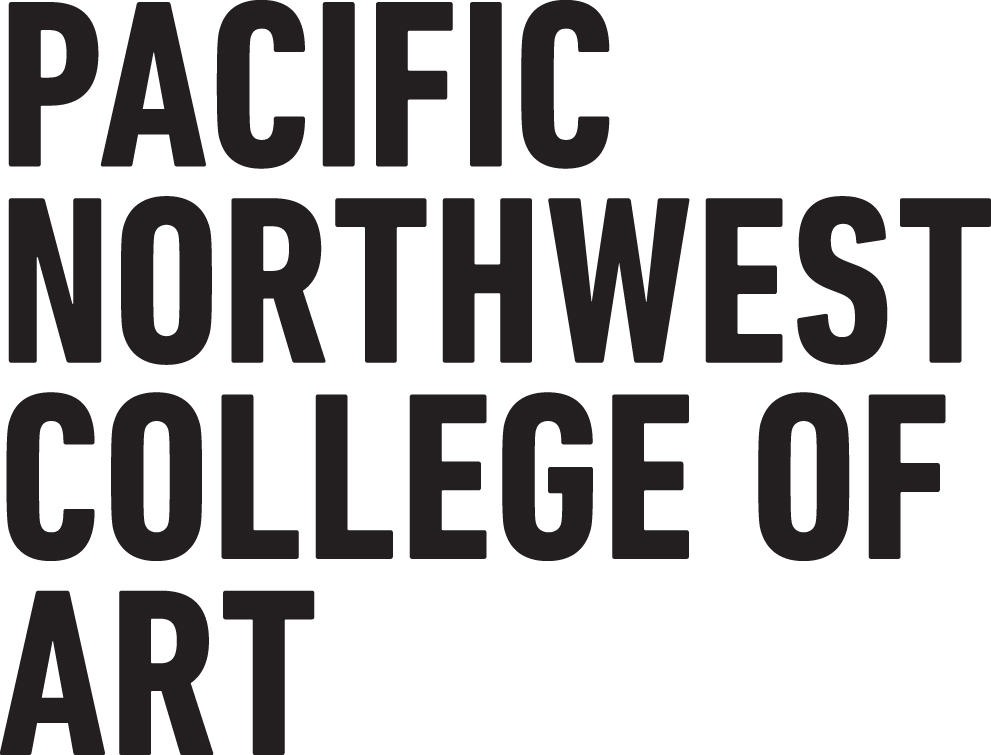

The Pacific Northwest College of Art (PNCA) is an art school of Willamette University and is located in Portland, Oregon. Established in 1909, the art school grants Bachelor of Fine Arts degrees and graduate degrees including the Master of Fine Arts (MFA) and Master of Arts (MA) degrees. It has an enrollment of about 500 students. The college merged with Willamette University in 2021.

The college has 10 Bachelor of Fine Arts majors and five graduate programs, a dual-degree MA/MFA option, and a Post-Baccalaureate program within the Hallie Ford School of Graduate Studies.

== History ==
Founded in 1909 as part of the Portland Art Museum, the school was originally known as the Museum Art School with Anna Belle Crocker serving as the head of the school; Kate Cameron Simmons was the first hired teacher. After the Pietro Belluschi designed home of the museum opened in 1932, the school moved into the upper floors of the building. In 1981, the school changed its name to Pacific Northwest College of Art in order to reflect its independence from the museum. The independence was solidified in April 1994 when the college formally split from the art museum and was incorporated as a legal entity distinct from the museum.

In 1998, the college moved to its former campus in Portland's Pearl District. PNCA hired Thomas Manley in 2003 as president of the institution, replacing Sally Lawrence. Manley proposed a plan to the school's board in 2004 to expand the college and move towards Portland's North Park Blocks. The plan received a boost in 2007 when Hallie Ford donated $15 million to the school.

The school purchased the building housing the college in 2008, and also that year was given the 511 Federal Building by the federal government as part of a surplus building program. In 2009, the then independent Museum of Contemporary Craft moved into the DeSoto Building, which drained the museum's finances. PNCA loaned the museum money leading to a partnership and possible merger.

In 2012, the school announced they would centralize their programs in Portland's Old Town at the 511 Federal Building. PNCA opened their first residence hall in August 2013 at a cost of $7.3 million, called ArtHouse. As part of its move to the Old Town area, the college sold its main building in the Pearl District in 2013 for $11.75 million. The school secured $20 million in loans from the Portland Development Commission in November 2013 to fund the renovations. Renovations were completed in January 2015, with classes starting at the new campus in February 2015.

In late 2018, the college briefly explored merging with the Oregon College of Art and Craft but they decided against the merger. Two years later, PNCA announced plans to merge with Willamette University to become the fourth college within the university. On June 30, 2021, the merger was finalized. PNCA retains its campus in downtown Portland at the 511 Federal Building and offers classes for Willamette University students and allows art students to take classes at the Willamette's Salem campus.

== Campus and facilities ==
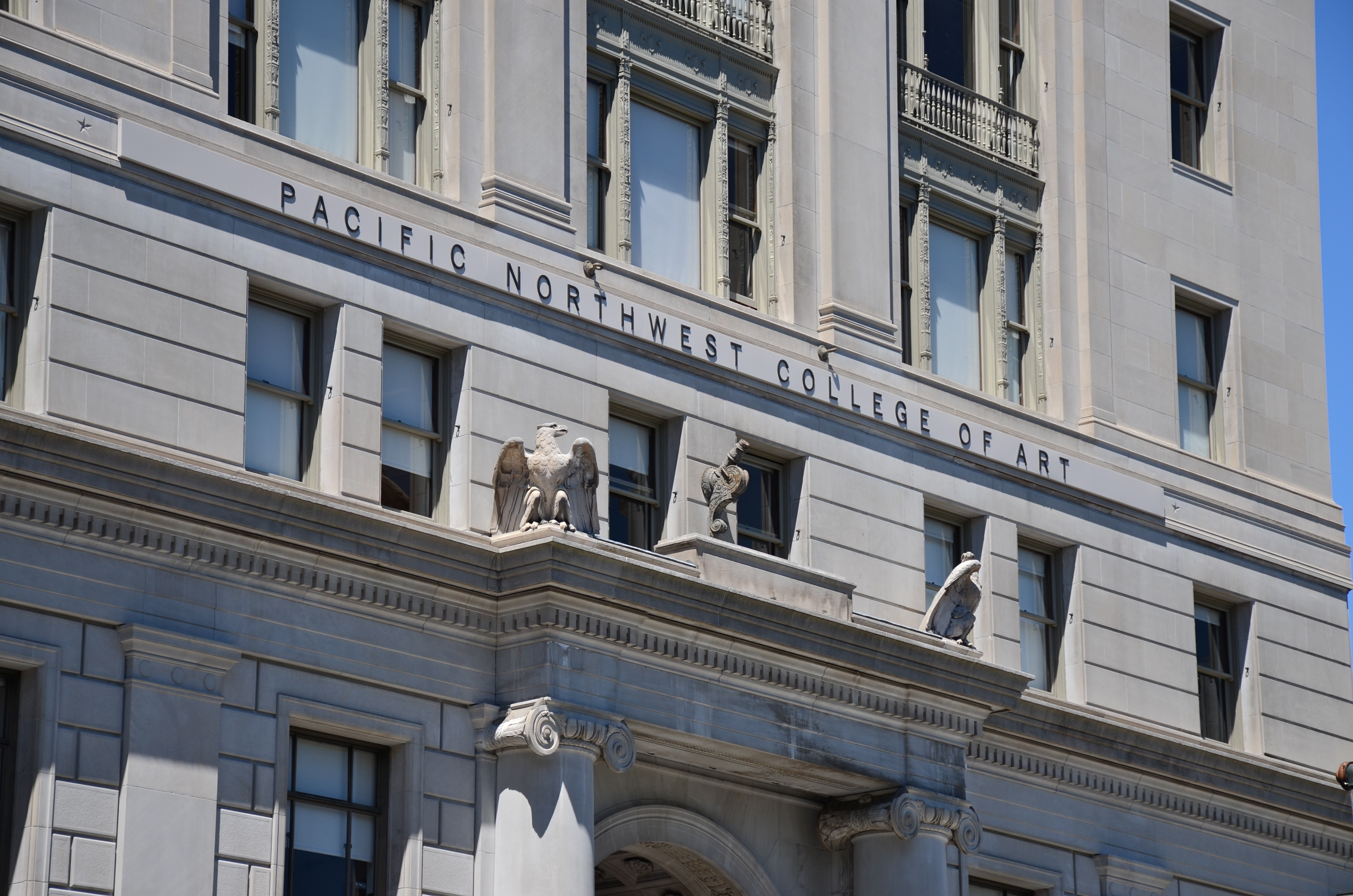
The former 511 Federal Building relettered for PNCA

As of February 2015, PNCA's main campus building, known as the Arlene and Harold Schnitzer Center for Art and Design, is located at 511 NW Broadway in northwest Portland, in the Pearl District. Known previously as the 511 Federal Building, it is a former post office that is on the National Register of Historic Places.

=== ArtHouse ===
The college opened its first student housing in 2013 with the completion of ArtHouse at NW Park and Couch. The six-story building has 50 apartments plus retail space on the ground floor. Designed by architect Thomas Robinson, the project cost $7.3 million to build the modernistic structure. ArtHouse was built where Powell's Technical Books was located and is managed by PTLA.

=== Glass building ===
The Glass building was formerly an industrial glass manufacturing warehouse located at 2139 N Kerby in north Portland, which has now PNCA's applied arts studio. It consists of individual MFA studios surrounded by communal wood, metal, sculpture, plaster, ceramics, and fiber facilities.

=== Exhibition spaces ===
PNCA's exhibition department is the Center for Contemporary Art & Culture (CCAC), which is a platform for cultural production including exhibition, lecture, performance, and publication. CCAC is directed by Mack McFarland and has exhibited artists including Wangechi Mutu, Cauleen Smith, James Rosenquist, and David Horvitz. CCAC has two galleries, the 511 Gallery (formerly the Philip Feldman Gallery + Project Space) and the Dorothy Lemelson Innovation Studio. Additional exhibition spaces include Holt Gallery, Gallery 157, Gallery B10, and New Commons. The Lodge Gallery @ Allied Works Architecture host regular exhibitions.

=== Arlene and Harold Schnitzer Center for Art and Design ===
In March 2008, PNCA announced the U.S. Department of Education and the General Services Administration approved PNCA's application to make the 511 Federal Building a permanent part of the school's campus. Located on the North Park Blocks, the building was renovated for use by the college in 2014–15. After the $30 million in renovations were complete in February 2015, the building was renamed as the Arlene and Harold Schnitzer Center for Art and Design.

== Academics ==
When the college was independent, it was accredited by both the National Association of Schools of Art and Design (NASAD) and the Northwest Commission on Colleges and Universities (NWCCU). PNCA was affiliated with the Association of Independent Colleges of Art and Design, the National Association of Independent Colleges and Universities, the Council for Higher Education Accreditation, the Art Resources Consortium Northwest, the Oregon Independent College Association, and the Foundations in Art: Theory and Education.

=== Programs and degrees ===
PNCA offers 11 Bachelor of Fine Arts programs and 8 graduate programs. The graduate school also offers a post-baccalaureate program. In addition to degrees, the college offers pre-college programs of high school programs, classes, and intensives. PNCA previously provided Community Education in art and design to the local community but this program ended in 2023.

=== Students ===
In 2024, there were 522 undergraduate students and 125 graduate students at PNCA with a 9 to 1 student to faculty ratio. The continuing education program at that time served approximately 1,450 students part-time each year.

=== Faculty ===
PNCA employs 121 faculty members (some full- and more primarily part-time/adjunct labor). Most faculty are working artists and designers, many showing both nationally and internationally.

Notable faculty include:

- Director of the Hallie Ford School of Graduate Studies and Founding Chair of MFA in Visual Studies Program MK Guth who was curated into the 2008 Whitney Biennial.
- Monica Drake, award-winning author, designed and launched the BFA in Writing; initiated and launched the Native Voices Speaker Series, funded primarily by the Native Arts and Cultures Foundation.
- Kristan Kennedy, award-winning artist and Artistic Director and Curator of Visual Art at the Portland Institute for Contemporary Art (PICA) who also oversees the Precipice Fund, a grant for artist-run organizations and collaborative projects in Portland, Oregon, as part of the Andy Warhol Foundation for the Visual Arts’ Regional Regranting Program.
