= Bonnie Bronson Fellowship =

- Description: Annual award for Pacific Northwest artists
- Country: United States
- Presented by: Bonnie Bronson Fund

The Bonnie Bronson Fellowship, named after American painter and sculptor Bonnie Bronson, is an award presented annually to Pacific Northwest artists.

== Recipients ==
- Christine Bourdette (1992)
- Judy Cooke (1993)
- Ronna Neuenschwander (1994)
- Fernanda D'Agostino (1995)
- Carolyn King (1996)
- Lucinda Parker (1997)
- Judy Hill (1998)
- Adriene Cruz (1999)
- Helen Lessick (2000)
- Ann Hughes (2001)
- Malia Jensen (2002)
- Christopher Rauschenberg (2003)
- Kristy Edmunds (2004)
- Paul Sutinen (2005)
- Bill Will (2006)
- Laura Ross-Paul (2007)
- MK Guth (2008)
- Marie Watt (2009)
- David Eckard (2010)
- Nan Curtis (2011)
- Pat Boas (2012)
- Wynne Greenwood (2013)
- Rankin Renwick (2014)
- Cynthia Lahti (2015)
- Lynne Woods Turner (2016)
- Susie Lee (2017)
- Kristan Kennedy (2018)
- Tannaz Farsi (2019)
- Natalie Ball (2020)
- Ed Bereal (2021)
- Dawn Cerny (2022)
- Samantha Wall (2022)
- Dana Lynn Louis (2023)
- Wendy Red Star (2024)
- Heather Watkins (2025)
- Brenda Mallory (2025)
