= Mark Russell (artistic director) =

Artistic director

- Born: 1955 (age 70–71); Wisconsin, U.S.
- Education: The University of Texas at Austin
- Title: Founder and Director, Under the Radar Festival

Mark Russell is an arts and cultural leader working in New York City. He founded the Under the Radar Festival in 2005 and continues to serve as director.

Originally begun at St Ann's Warehouse, the festival moved to The Public in 2006, where it remained until 2023 when The Public announced their cancellation of the relationship. Working with numerous New York artists and institutions, Russell was able to continue the activities of the festival in January 2024 without the involvement of The Public.

Over the course of the two decades the Festival has been in existence, it has been credited with the discovery of many artists of note, including Richard Maxwell, Elevator Repair Service, 600 Highway Men, and Nature Theatre of Oklahoma.

From 1983-2004, Russell was the Executive Artistic Director of Performance Space 122 (P.S. 122) during which time he is credited, per The New York Times, with "transforming the red-brick public school on Ninth Street and First Avenue into a renowned performance space, and in the process fostering the careers of cutting-edge artists like Eric Bogosian, Karen Finley, Blue Man Group, John Leguizamo, Danny Hoch, Meredith Monk and Spalding Gray".

From 2006-2008, Russell oversaw direction of The Portland Institute for Contemporary Art's Time-Based Art (TBA) Festival.

== Recognition ==
- Obie Awards - Ross Wetzsteon Award, 2024
- MacDowell Fellowship - Theater Arts, 2025
