= Lincoln Hall (Portland, Oregon) =

Building on the Portland State University campus in Portland, Oregon, U.S.

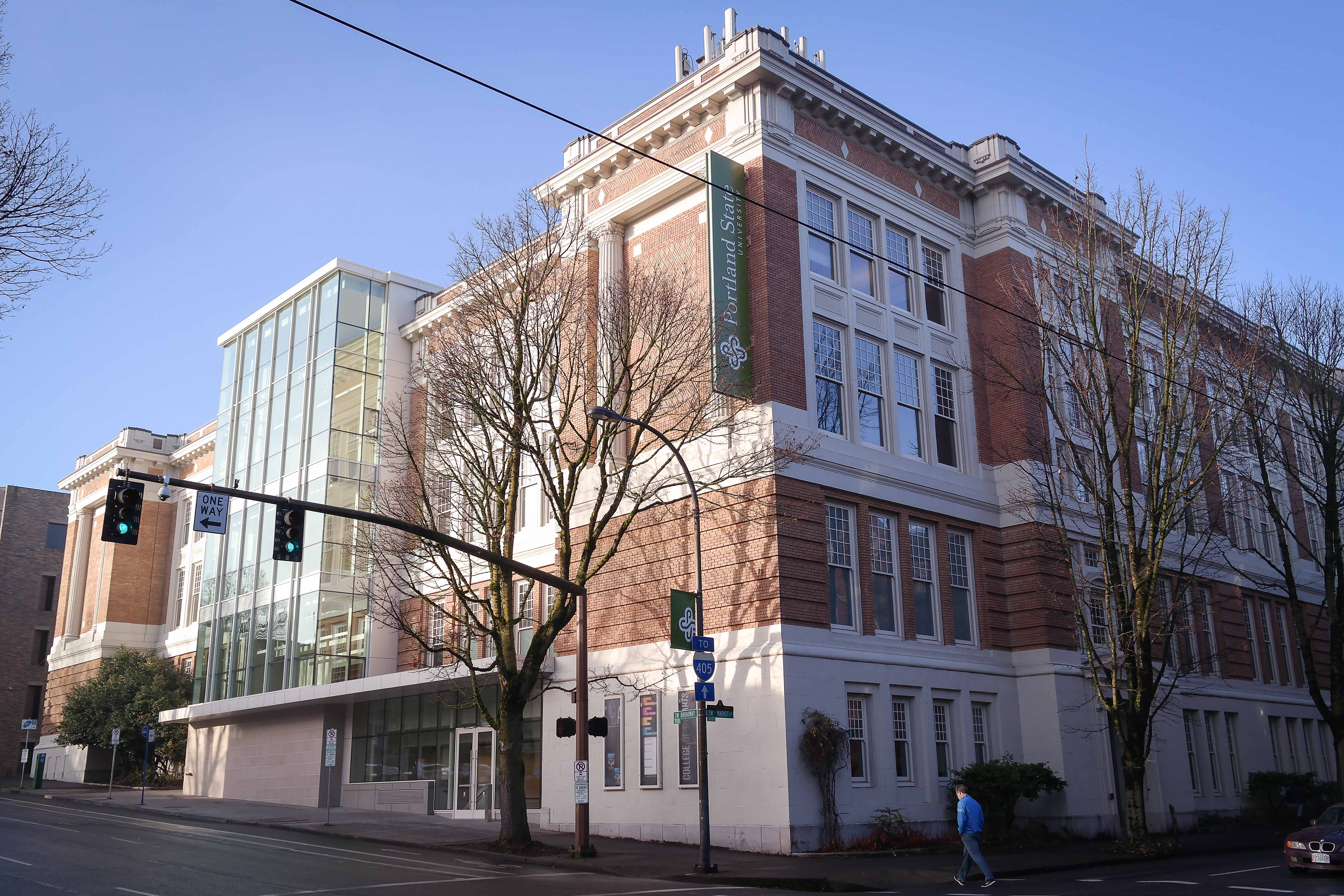

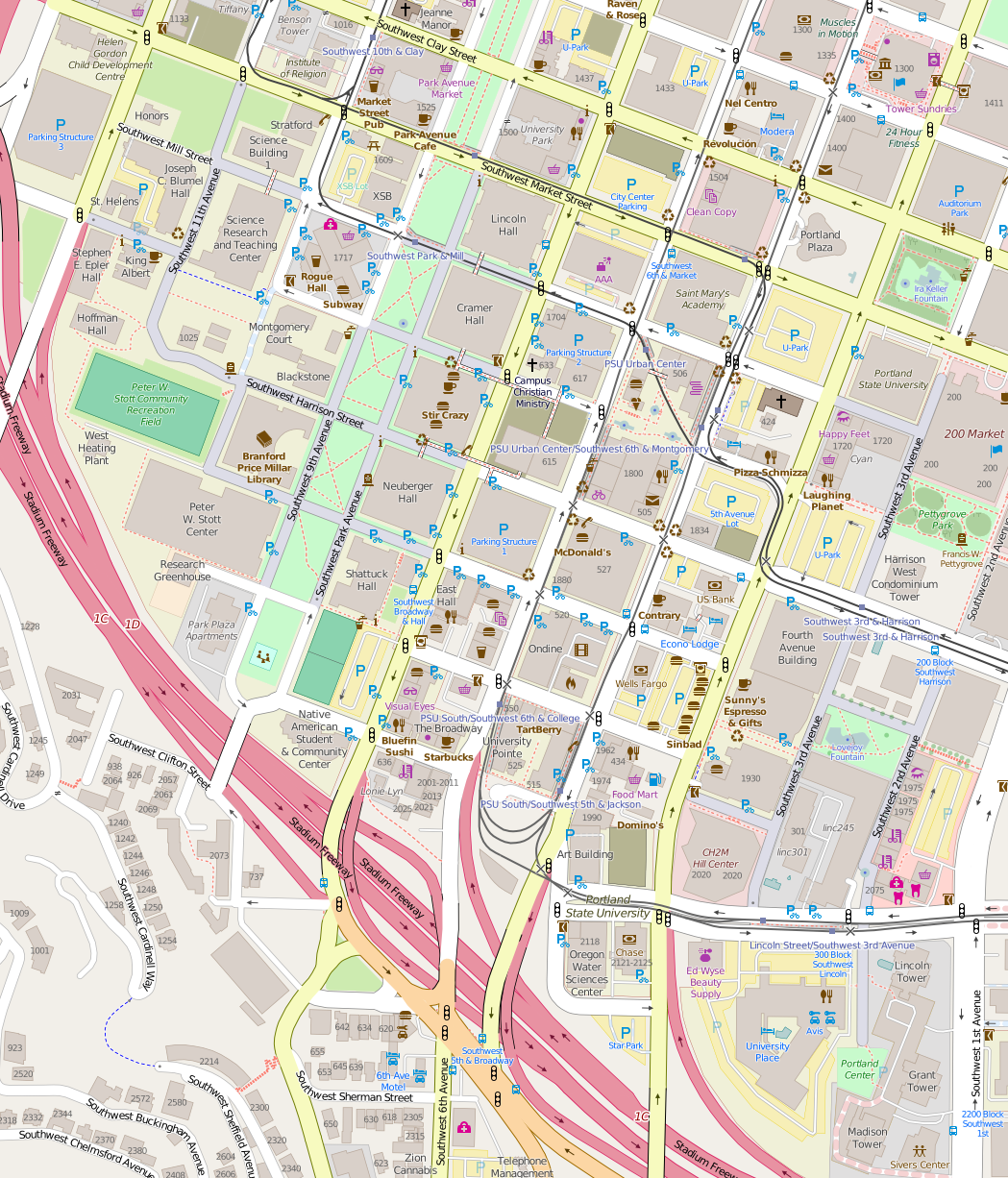
- Location on Portland State University campus
- Former names: Lincoln High School
- Alternative names: Old Lincoln, Old Main

General information
- Architectural style: American Renaissance
- Location: Portland, Oregon, U.S., 1620 SW Park Avenue
- Coordinates: 45.513259°N 122.683943°W
- Completed: 1912
- Owner: Portland State University

Technical details
- Structural system: Steel, brick, concrete
- Floor count: 4
- Floor area: 37,820 square feet (3,514 m^{2})

Design and construction
- Architect: Morris H. Whitehouse
- Architecture firm: Whitehouse and Fouilhoux Architecture

Renovating team
- Renovating firm: Boora Architects

Lincoln Hall is an historic building located in Portland, Oregon, built in 1912. It is the home of the theatre, film, and performing arts departments at Portland State University. It was originally home to Lincoln High School before becoming a part of the Portland State College in 1955.

== History ==
Designed by Morris H. Whitehouse of Whitehouse and Fouilhoux Architecture, it was constructed as the second home of Lincoln High School in 1912. The 45-room schoolhouse was constructed on a former cow pasture belonging to Jacob Kamm, who was involved in steamboat shipping on the Columbia River. In 1937, during its use as Lincoln High School, the building served 1580 students. After the 1948 flood of Vanport City, Oregon, the Oregon State Board of Higher Education purchased the building from the Portland Public School District in 1952 for $875,000 as a new home for the Vanport Extension Center. The purchase followed the passing of House Bill 213, signed by Paul Patterson on April 15, 1949.

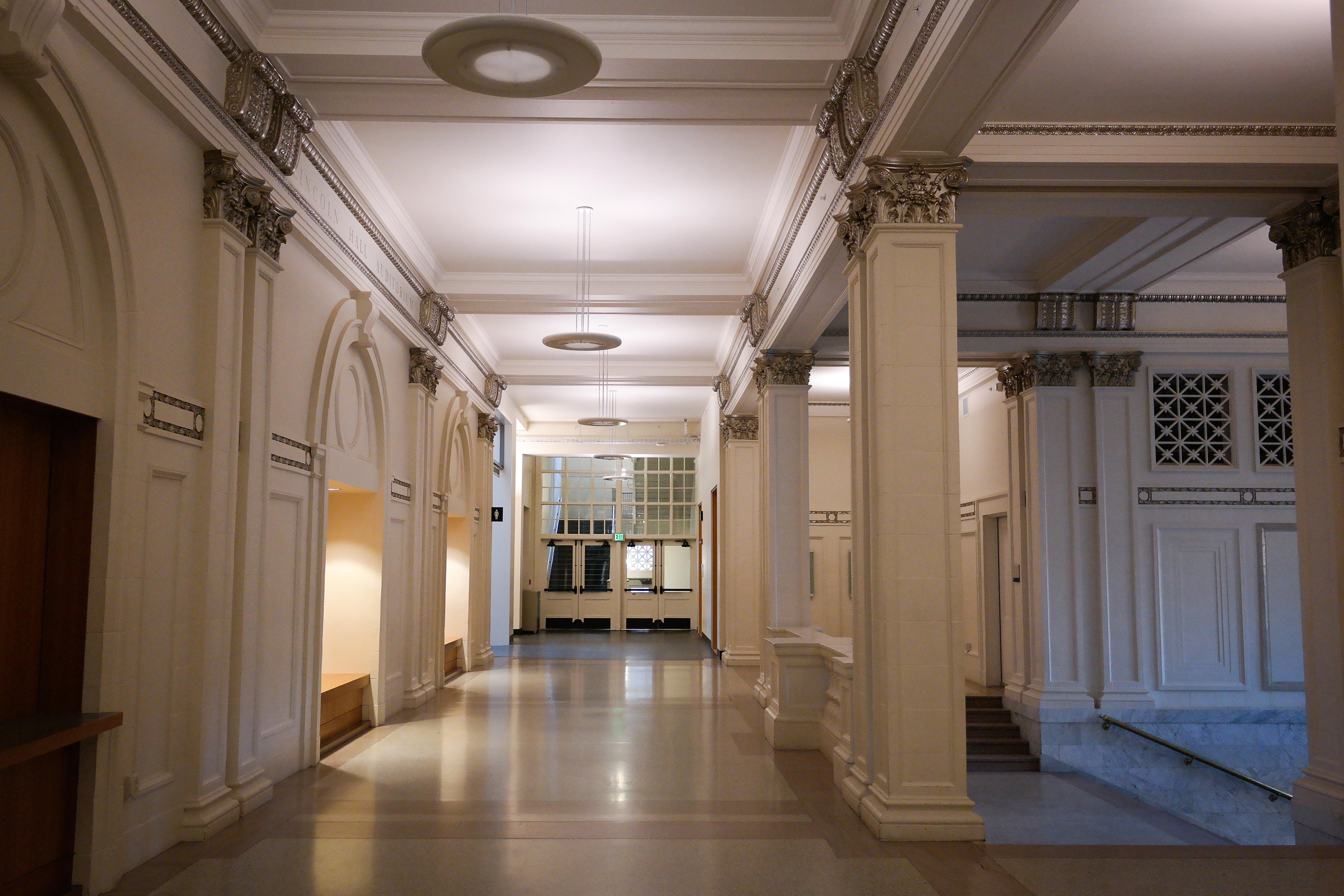
Interior of Lincoln Hall

Originally, the Vanport Extension Center intended to move into Lincoln Hall in the fall of 1951, but delays in construction of the new Lincoln High School forced the extension center to wait. The building was remodeled by E. Carl Schiewe for approximately $113,000, and was ready in September 1952 for the school to move in. Upon moving, Vanport Extension Center joined the Portland Extension Center, which had held night classes in Lincoln Hall for some time. Shortly after moving to Lincoln Hall, the two extension centers merged into Portland State Extension Center. In 1955, the extension center became a college by 1955 Senate Bill 1 and subsequently named Portland State College. The college was "located on the site of the former Lincoln High School and any areas in the vicinity of such property."

Repairs were needed to the building, even after the 1951-52 remodel, as it was forty years old and in a state of deferred maintenance. The Daily Vanguard stated the doors "required more than a gentleman to open doors for the coeds. It took a Sampson. Usually persons had to compromise; one leaning, the other pushing to open them. To get out of the building was like trying to leave a bank vault."

The building has been known as Lincoln High School, Old Lincoln High School, Old Main, Portland State Extension Center, and Lincoln Hall.

== Events ==
In addition to university performing arts, Lincoln Hall has been a venue for local events such as mayoral debates, the Oregon Ballet Theatre, and Portland Institute for Contemporary Art (PICA) events including the Time-Based Art Festival. Notable performers at Lincoln Hall have included Alfredo Rolando Ortiz, the National Theatre of the Deaf, and the Florestan Trio.

== Renovations ==
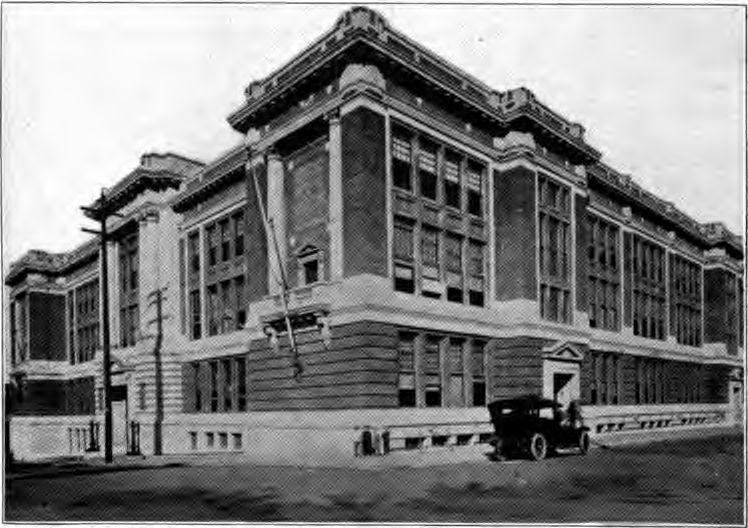
Lincoln Hall, then Lincoln High School, circa 1920

Through the years, renovations have occurred to change the usage of Lincoln Hall. In 1966, a gymnasium in the basement was converted into a sloped lecture hall, currently used as a 200-seat concert hall.

A structural renovation in 1974 expanded the main auditorium, including converting the floor and balcony style seating to sloped seating, which reduced seating capacity from 750 to 500 seats. This renovation also added an orchestra pit, added an elevator, and expanded other rooms.

After a 2000 seismic evaluation, the building was condemned but used for classes due to a lack of space. Oregon governor Ted Kulongoski urged the Oregon Legislature to pass funding to pay for improvements, part of a $175 million stimulus package for state agencies.

A $29 million seismic retrofit, replacement of the asbestos roof, and general remodel was begun in the summer of 2008 with designs by Boora Architects and Howard S. Wright Construction as the general contractor. Construction was completed in August 2010, and has acquired LEED Gold standards.

Lincoln Hall contains a skybridge and a tunnel to the adjacent Cramer Hall, added in the first phase of Cramer Hall construction, 1955-1958.
