= Lincoln High School (Portland, Oregon) =

Public high school in Portland, Oregon

Location
- 1750 Southwest Salmon Street; Portland, (Multnomah County), Oregon 97205; United States; 45.51889°N 122.68830°W

Information
- Type: Public
- Opened: 1869
- School district: Portland Public Schools
- Principal: Peyton Chapman
- Faculty: 89
- Grades: 9–12
- Enrollment: 1,579 (2023–2024)
- Colors: Red and white
- Athletics conference: OSAA Portland Interscholastic League 6A-1
- Nickname: Cardinals
- Rival: Ida B. Wells High School
- Newspaper: The Cardinal Times
- Feeder schools: West Sylvan Middle School; Skyline K-8
- Alumni: Elliott Smith, Matt Groening, Mel Blanc
- Website: lincoln.pps.net
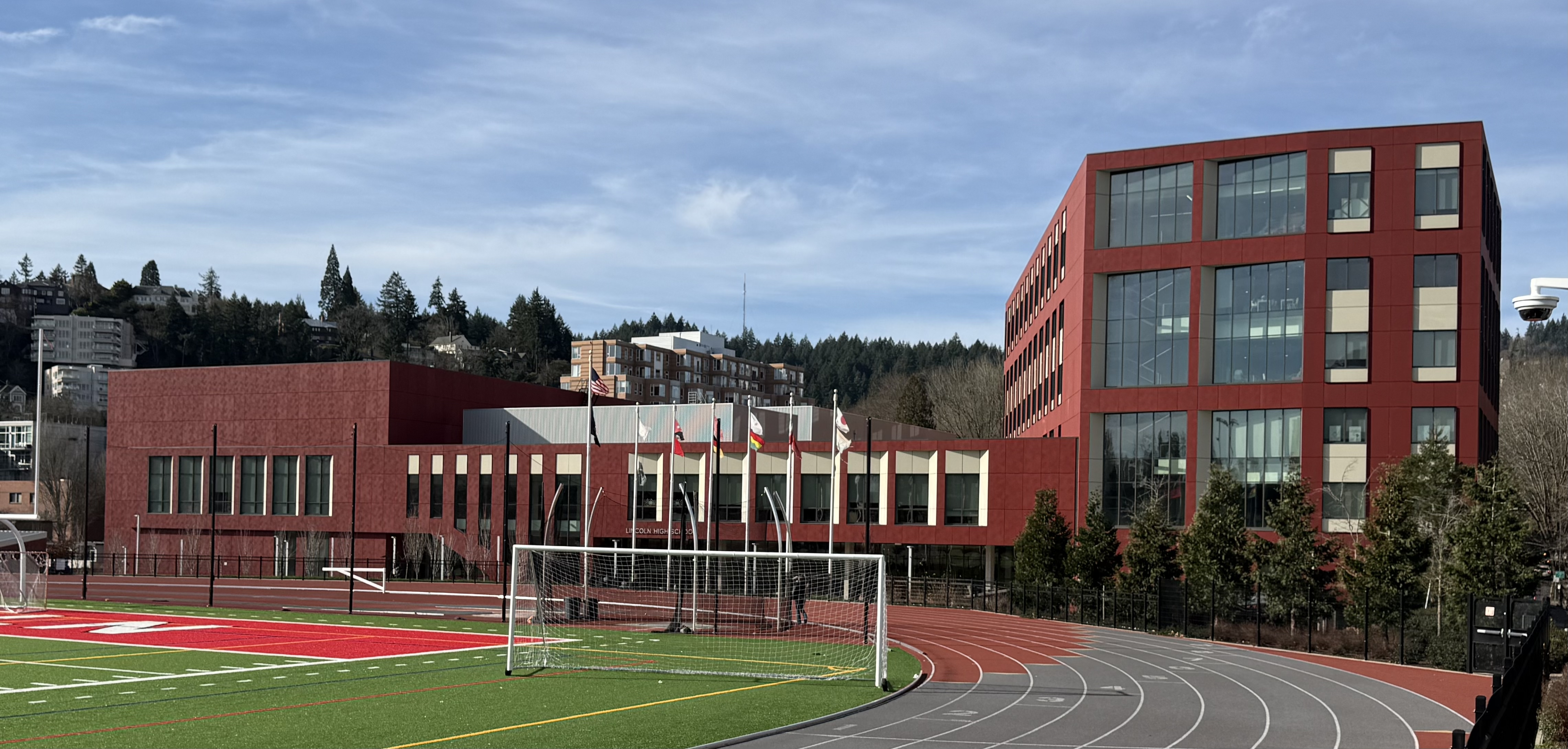
- The new building as of 2025

Lincoln High School (LHS) is a public high school located in the Goose Hollow neighborhood of Portland, Oregon, United States. It was established in 1869 as Portland High School. Its attendance boundary includes Downtown Portland, Goose Hollow, Northwest Portland, and a part of West Haven-Sylvan. The school's current main building opened in 2022.

== History ==
=== 19th century ===
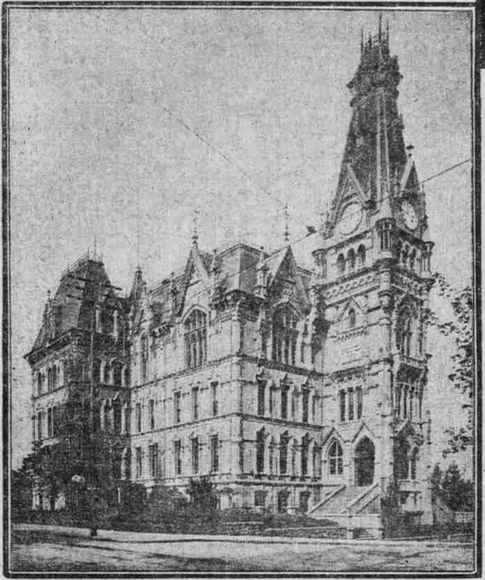
The 1885 high school building which, in 1909, became the first to take the name Lincoln High School

With an initial enrollment of 45 students, the school was established in 1869 as the Portland High School in the North Central School sited on Block 80 of Couch's Addition (bounded by NW 11th & 12th and Couch & Davis Streets). The principal was J.W. Johnson. The high school moved from the top floors of the North Central School to the Central School in 1873 (located where Pioneer Courthouse Square is today) and moved again to the Park School (block bounded by Park, 10th, Madison, and Jefferson (now the Portland Art Museum)) in 1878. The first building to be known as Lincoln High School was built at SW 14th and Morrison in 1885, but was still named West Side High School at the time. The land for the 14th and Morrison School was given to the school district by Mrs. Simeon Gannett Reed (wife of the founder of Reed College) in 1869 and the building was designed by William Stokes, an architect who had recently moved to Portland from Oakland, California. The building was designed by prominent local architect William Stokes and situated in the block bounded by 14th, Morrison, Lownsdale (now 15th) and Alder Streets.

In 1889, a "very successful" night school program was started at the first purpose-built building at SW 14th and Morrison.

=== 20th century ===
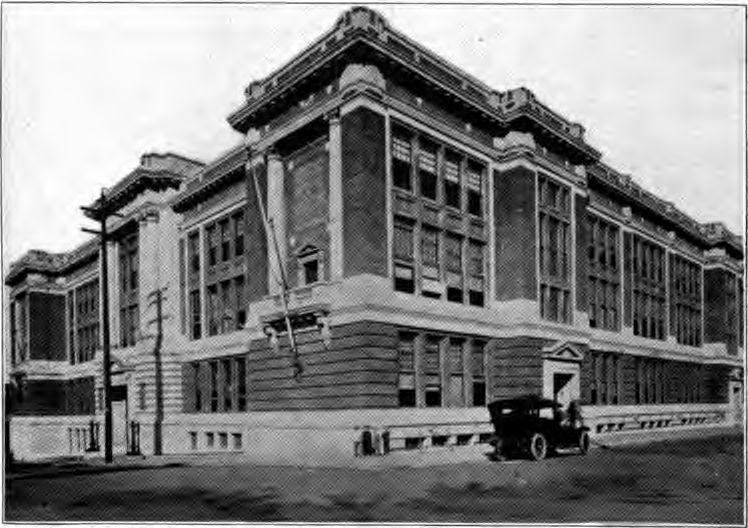
Lincoln High School circa 1920, now known as Lincoln Hall and part of Portland State University

The school was renamed Lincoln High School in 1909, and moved to the 45-room South Park Blocks location (now known as Lincoln Hall) when construction was completed in 1912. The building occupies the block bounded by Market & Mill Streets and Park & Broadway. (After the 1912 move, the old building of 1885 was used by the Girls' Polytechnic School. In fall 1928, that school moved to a new building on the east side, leaving the 1885 building vacant, and it was demolished by 1930.)

In 1937, the school had grown to 1,580 students and 53 teachers. In 1972, it had 1,253 students, 7% of whom were black (a contemporary report noted they were mostly "voluntary transfers"); 4.3% of the students were on welfare.

Also in 1937, the Portland Police Bureau's anti-leftist "Red Squad" interrogated a student union leader. This rapidly led to the disbanding of the Silver Shirts-affiliated Red Squad.

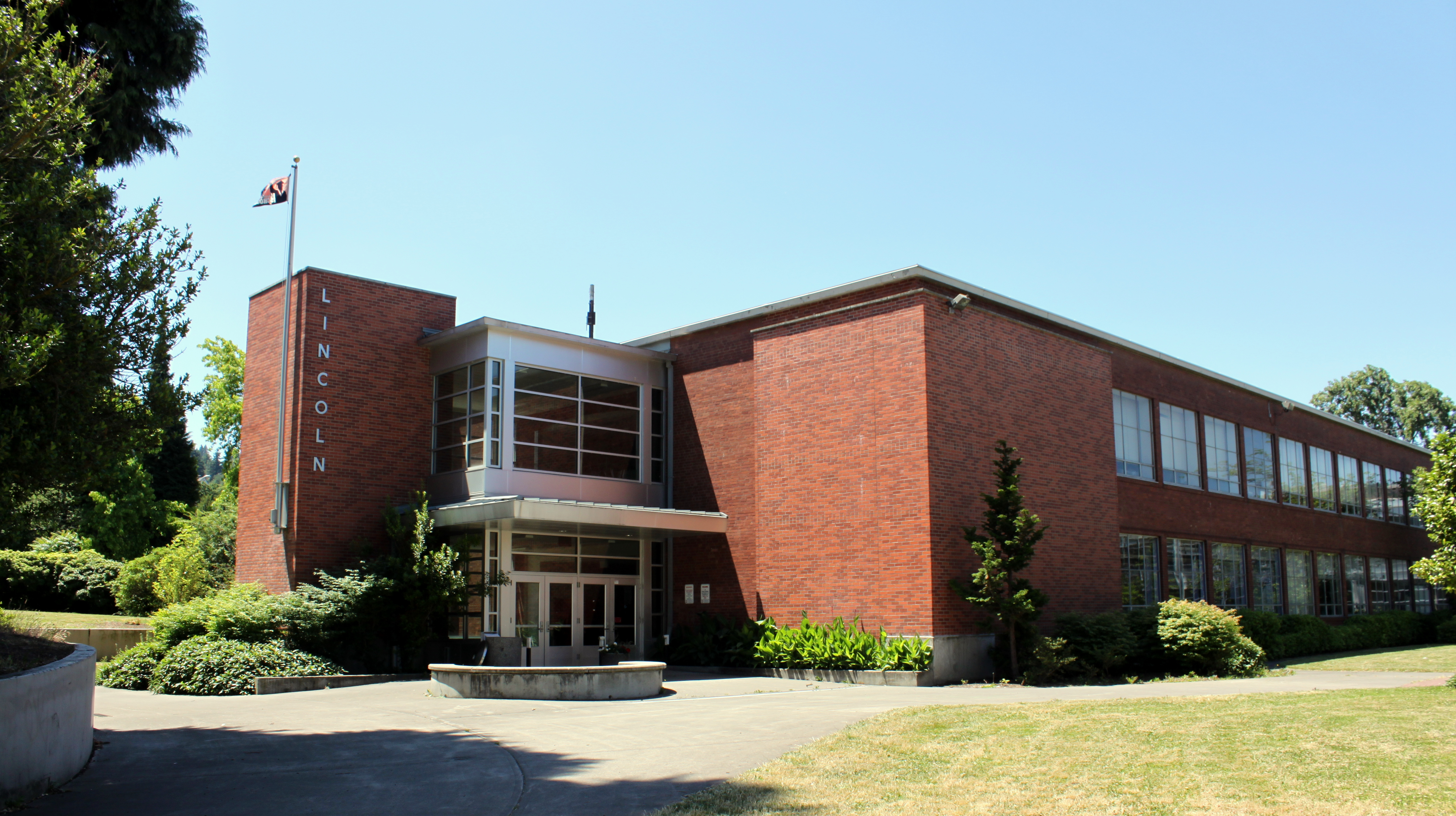
The old building before demolition in 2023

Due to the baby boom and passing of a $25 million building levy by the school district in 1947, a new high school was slated. The existing building was sold to the Vanport Extension Center (now Portland State University) in April 1949 for $875,000, with the intention that the high school would not leave for "at least two years." Land was cleared for the school by June 1950 on the former Jacob Kamm House property.

=== 21st century ===
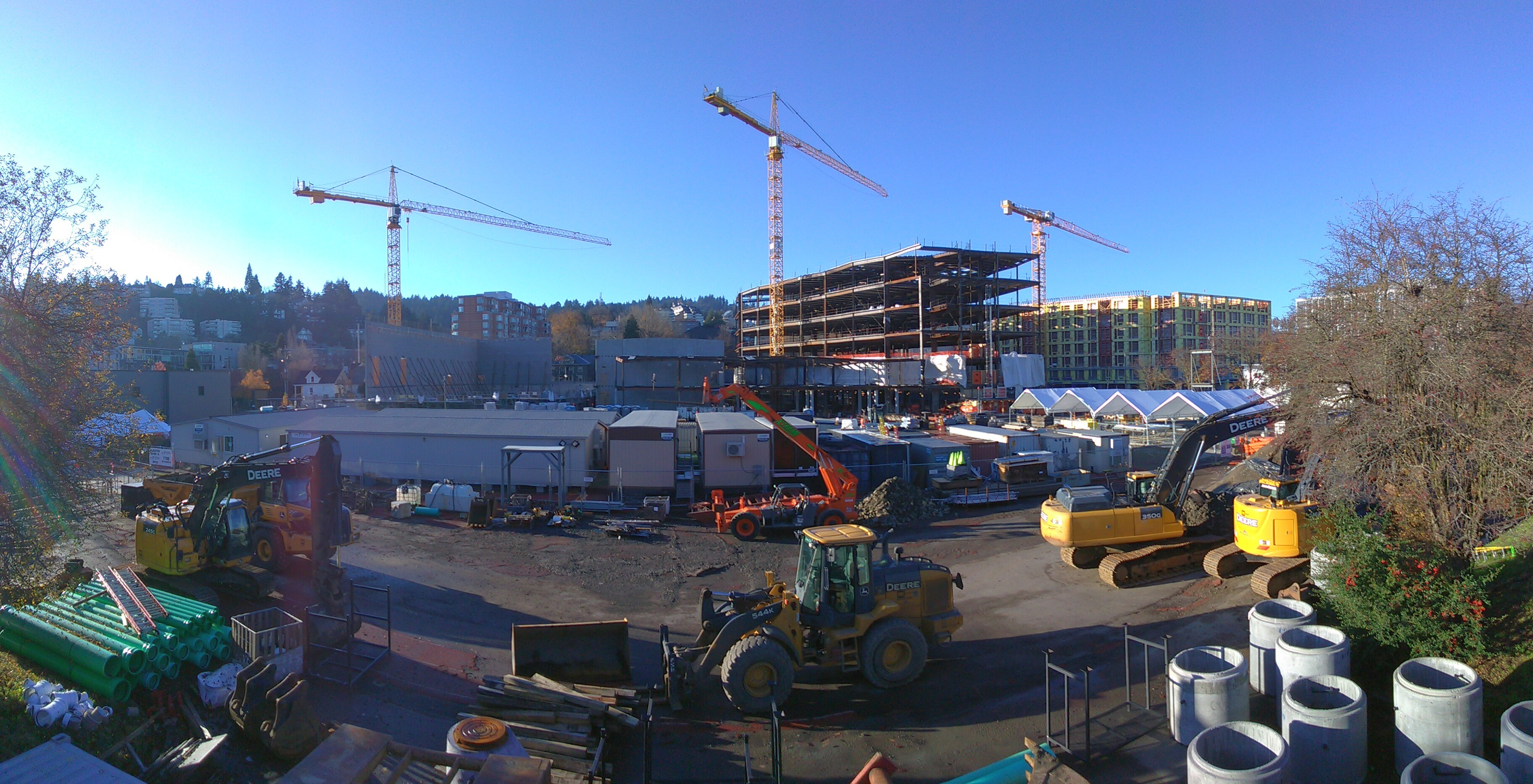
New campus under construction in November 2020

The school is located on the MAX Light Rail system.

Lincoln was slated to be completely rebuilt as part of a $790 million bond measure passed in 2017. Construction began in the summer of 2020, with students returning at the beginning of the 2022 school year. The new building was built where the field used to sit, leaving the old building available for use in the interim years. The new building was designed by Bora and with most of the construction done by Hoffman.

== Student profile ==
Student Population 2020-2023
Race and Ethnicity	Total %
White	62.3
Hispanic	11.0
Asian	9.8
Black	2.9
Native American	0.3
Pacific Islander	0.2
Mixed	12.3

=== Diversity ===
Lincoln has a majority white population, a number of factors contribute to this, including the feeder schools and overall race demographics of Portland. The 2023 census showed that 70.1% of Portland identified as white, about 8% higher than Lincoln's population.

About 92% of its students live within the school's neighborhood.

In 2008, 89% of the school's seniors received a high school diploma. Of 372 students, 330 graduated, 34 dropped out, four received a modified diploma, and four were still enrolled in high school the following year. For the 2010–11 school year, Lincoln had the highest overall graduation rate among Portland Public high schools, at 84 percent. About 90% of its Asian-American students graduated on time, as did 88% of Latino students. However, only 38% of its five African-American students graduated on time, which was the worst rate in the district.

== Activities ==
=== Constitution Team ===
Lincoln's constitution team is nationally recognized for winning the We the People civics competition, and has won 23 state championships and seven national titles.

National Titles
Year	Additional Notes
2025	(Co-champion) Due to a scoring error, the school initially placed 3rd.
2016	
2014	
2012	
1996	
1991	
1990	

== Athletics ==
The school competes in a variety of sports, and has won numerous district and state championships. Lincoln competes in the Portland Interscholastic League under 6A classification.

=== State championships ===
List of Championships Won
Year	Classification	Sport	Notes
2025	6A	Boys Tennis	
2025	6A	Girls Cross Country	
2024	6A	Girls Cross Country	
2023	6A	Boys Track & Field	
2022	6A	Boys Tennis	
2015	6A	Boys Soccer	
2013	6A	Girls Tennis	
2012	6A	Girls Tennis	Tie with Jesuit
2011	6A	Girls Tennis	
2010	6A Large	Dance/Drill	
2010	6A	Girls Tennis	
2009	6A Large	Dance/Drill	
2008	6A	Girls Soccer	
2007	6A	Girls Soccer	
2007	6A Large	Dance/Drill	
2007	6A	Boys Track & Field	
2007	6A	Girls Track & Field	
2006	4A Large	Dance/Drill	
2005	4A Large	Dance/Drill	
2004	4A Large	Dance/Drill	
2003	4A Large	Dance/Drill	
2002	4A Large	Dance/Drill	
1995	4A	Girls Track & Field	
1989		Girls Swimming	
1989		Girls Tennis	
1988		Boys Tennis	
1988		Girls Tennis	
1985	AAA	Boys Tennis	
1982		Girls Swimming	
1980	AAA	Girls Track & Field	
1978	AAA	Girls Cross Country	
1957	A-1	Boys Basketball	
1956	A	Baseball	
1955		Boys Cross Country	
1954		Boys Cross Country	
1952	A	Boys Basketball	
1951		Boys Cross Country	
1948		Girls Swimming	
1919		Boys Basketball	

== Notable alumni ==
=== Sports ===
- Peter Baum, 2012 Tewaaraton Trophy winner and first overall pick of the 2012 Major League Lacrosse draft
- Ron East, professional football player
- Harry Glickman, sports promoter, "father of professional sports" in Oregon
- Jim Grelle, runner
- Swede Halbrook, former professional basketball player
- Peter Jacobsen, professional golfer
- Kendall Johnson, professional soccer player
- Elmer Kolberg, professional football player
- Mickey Lolich, professional baseball player, 1968 World Series MVP Award winner
- Johnny Pesky, professional baseball player
- Richard Sanders, world champion and two-time Olympic silver medal-winning wrestler
- Matthew Sheldon, professional soccer player

=== Music ===
- Marion Bauer, composer, educator, and critic
- Kathleen Hanna, composer, writer, activist and member of Bikini Kill
- Robert Mann, violinist and founding member of Juilliard String Quartet
- Tye North, musician and former member of Leftover Salmon
- Elliott Smith, singer-songwriter
- Nate Query, musician and member of The Decemberists

=== Media ===
- Mel Blanc, voice actor
- Rick Emerson, radio personality
- Alex Frost, actor
- Matt Groening, cartoonist
- Colleen Miller, actress
- Rebecca Schaeffer, actress
- Lori Singer, actress and cellist

=== Other ===
- Daniel E. Barbey, Vice Admiral, USN
- Walter Cole, entrepreneur, drag performer, better known as Darcelle XV
- Chris DeWolfe, businessman, Myspace
- Aaron Director, professor who helped develop the Chicago school of economics
- S. David Griggs, astronaut
- David E. Jeremiah, Admiral USN, Vice-chairman of the Joint Chiefs of Staff under Colin Powell
- Kenneth Koe, pharmacologist & neuroscientist, co-inventor of anti-depressant drug Zoloft
- Hans A. Linde, attorney and justice on the Oregon Supreme Court
- Alfred E. Mann, entrepreneur and philanthropist (brother of notable alumnus Robert Mann)
- Chet Orloff, director of Oregon Historical Society, professor, writer
- Richard Neuberger, journalist and U.S. Senator from Oregon
- Frank Branch Riley, attorney and public speaker
- Mark Rothko, modern artist
- Gary Snyder, poet
- Arthur Dewey Struble, Admiral, USN
- Nathan F. Twining, Chairman of the Joint Chiefs of Staff
- Ted Wheeler, 53rd Mayor of Portland
