= Mondavi Center =

Facility in California

Robert and Margrit Mondavi Center for the Performing Arts
- Mondavi Center
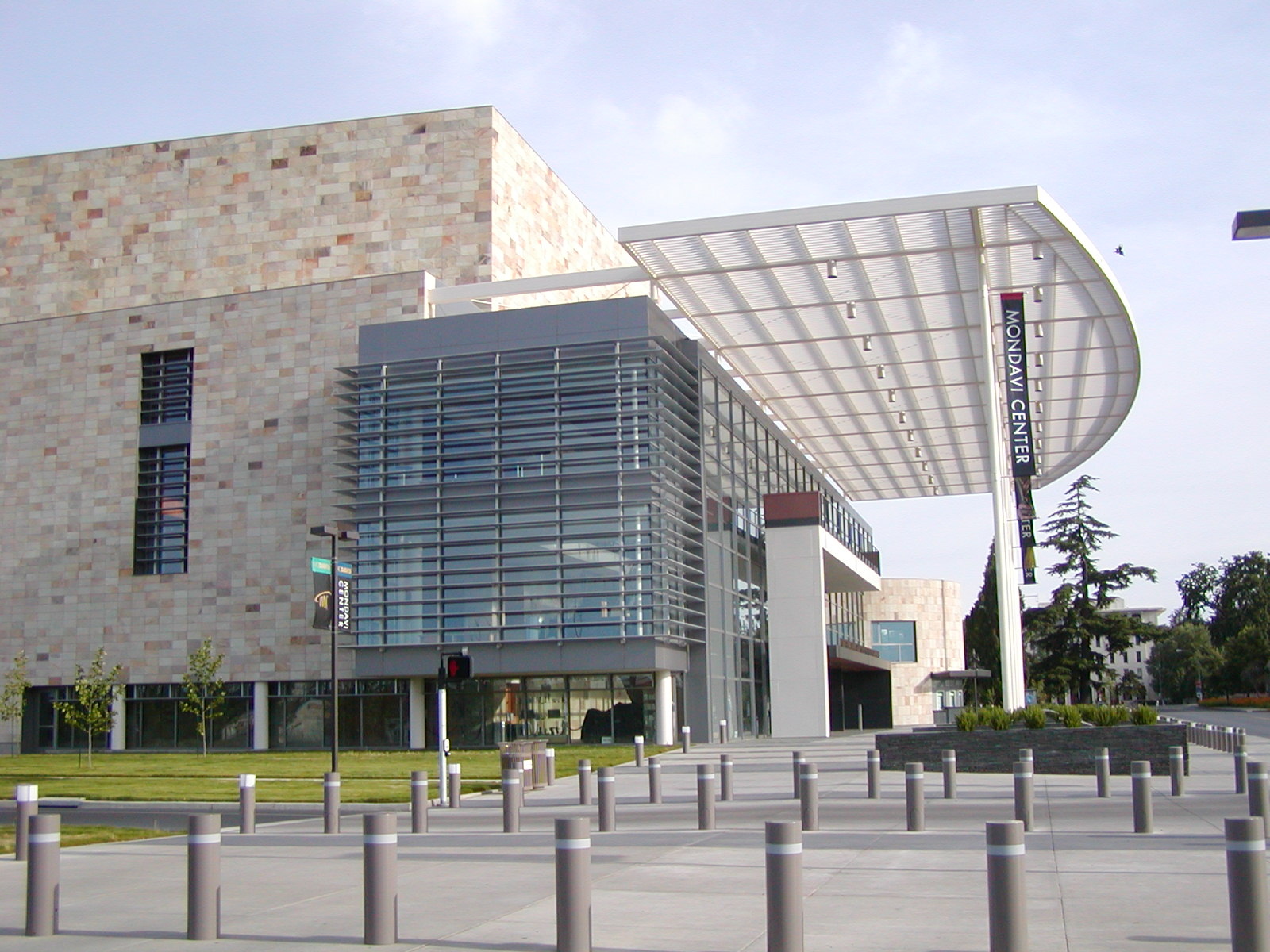
- Interactive map of Robert and Margrit Mondavi Center for the Performing Arts
- Location: Unincorporated Yolo County adjacent to Davis, California
- Coordinates: 38.53443°N 121.74883°W
- Owner: University of California, Davis
- Capacity: Jackson Hall: 1,801; Vanderhoef Studio Theater: 250
- Type: Performing arts center

Construction
- Opened: October 3, 2002
- Architect: Boora Architects

Website
- www.mondaviarts.org

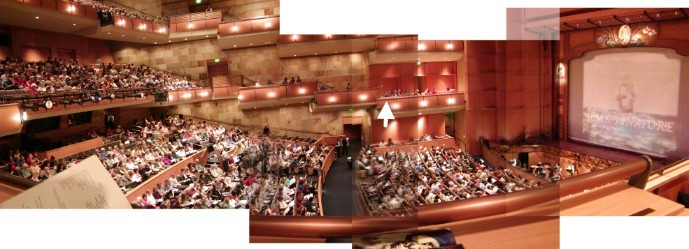
Mondavi Center, interior view

The Robert and Margrit Mondavi Center for the Performing Arts is a performing arts venue located on the UC Davis campus in unincorporated Yolo County, California. It is named for arts patron and vineyard operator Robert Mondavi, who donated US$10 million to help with the building costs, and who also helped finance The Robert Mondavi Institute for Wine and Food Science on the same campus.

Mondavi Center opened on October 3, 2002, for the UC Davis Symphony Orchestra and today serves as a venue for musical concerts, theater, dance, lecturers and other entertainers. The façade is a large glass-panelled lobby that is surrounded by sandstone that also lines the interior walls.

== Performance and other facilities ==
The facilities include:

- Jackson Hall, named for university professor William T. Jackson and philanthropist Barbara K. Jackson, who donated $5 million to the project in memory of her late husband. It seats 1,801.
- Vanderhoef Studio Theatre, named after former university Chancellor Larry N. Vanderhoef. It seats 250.

== Architecture and design ==
The facility was designed by Boora Architects of Portland, Oregon as a box within a box in order to insulate the hall from the sound of the nearby freeway and train tracks. The center also features moveable panels that can adjust the acoustics of the main hall and an orchestra shell on air casters.

Many green construction techniques were used to further the university's commitment to the environment and sustainable construction methods.

== Discovery of burial sites during construction ==
During the initial construction of the Mondavi Center in 1999 and 2000, the archaeological remnants of a Patwin village and 13 graves were uncovered. The remains were estimated to date from between 700 and 1200 A.D. In response, the Ad Hoc Committee to Honor the Patwin and Native Americans was formed with Native American Studies professors, students, staff, and Patwin elder Edward "Bill" Wright. In November 2011, the Native American Contemplative Garden was created near the Mondavi Center to commemorate the Patwin people and their history. In September 2019, a granite plaque honoring the burial sites disturbed by construction was erected outside the entrance of the Mondavi Center titled “Voices, Drums, Whistles. Sing, Dance, Remember.”
