= Kristan Kennedy =

American artist (born 1972)

- Born: October 28, 1972 (age 54); Brooklyn, New York City, New York, U.S.
- Education: New York State College of Ceramics
- Employer(s): Portland State University, Pacific Northwest College of Art, Portland Institute for Contemporary Art

Kristan Kennedy (born 1972) is an American artist, curator, educator and arts administrator. Kennedy is co-artistic director and curator of visual art at the Portland Institute for Contemporary Art (PICA). She is based in Portland, Oregon, and has exhibited internationally, working with various media including sculpture and painting.

== Early life and education ==
Kennedy was born on October 28, 1972, in Brooklyn, New York City. She received her BFA degree in 1994 from the New York State College of Art and Design within the New York State College of Ceramics at Alfred University, with a concentration on Printmaking and New Media. She moved to Portland, Oregon in 1995.

== Career ==
Kennedy has taught art history at Portland State University (PSU) and at Pacific Northwest College of Art (PNCA).

Kennedy is the co-artistic director and curator of visual art at the Portland Institute for Contemporary Art (PICA) where she curates programs for the annual Time-Based Arts Festival. She joined PICA's staff in 2003, managing public relations and marketing campaigns for the organization. In summer 2005, Kennedy moved positions to manage the visual program. In November 2017, Kennedy was promoted (alongside others) as an artistic director.

She is the founding director of Portland's Precipice Fund, a grant for local emerging artists. Since 2019, she is a board of trustee at Andy Warhol Foundation for Visual Art. Additionally, she sits on the advisory board for the Headlands Center for the Arts and is the former Board President of the Independent Publishing Resource Center. She has served as a juror, panelist, and advisor to several foundations and granting organizations, including Creative Capital, the Regional Arts and Culture Council, and Southern Exposure's "Alternate Exposure Grants."

In April 2018, Kennedy was awarded the Bonnie Bronson Fellowship Award, a prestigious regional award administered by Reed College that annually awards "a no-strings-attached cash prize to an artist of outstanding merit who lives and works in the Pacific Northwest."

Her printed ephemera work is held in several book collections, including the Museum of Modern Art, Dartmouth College, and the New York Public Library.

== Exhibitions ==
A select list of exhibitions by Kennedy:

=== Solo exhibitions ===
- 2017 – Other Colors, Fourteen30 Contemporary, Portland, Oregon
- 2014 – Kristan Kennedy meets a clock, Soloway, Brooklyn, New York
- 2013 – Sleeper, Fourteen30 Contemporary, Portland, Oregon
- 2005 – Elizabeth Leach, Portland, Oregon

=== Group exhibitions ===
- 2021 – Unquiet Objects, Disjecta Contemporary Art Center (now Oregon Contemporary), Oregon
- 2017 – Tomorrow Tomorrow, curated by Wallace Whitney and Stephanie Snyder, Canada, Manhattan, New York
- 2013 – OO, curated by Rob Halverson, Misako & Rosen, Tokyo, Japan
- 2013 – Paint Off/Paint On, Halsey McKay Gallery, East Hampton, New York
- 2013 – Kristan Kennedy and Gunta Stolzl, Zzzzzzz, Brooklyn, New York
- 2011 – Interior Margins, curated by Stephanie Snyder, Lumber Room, Portland, Oregon

== Curation work ==
- 2021 – Dreams of Unknown Islands, created by Sasha Wortzel and curated by Kristan Kennedy, Oolite Arts, Miami Beach, Florida
- 2011 – Between my head and my hand, there is always the face of death, Feldman Gallery + Project Space, Pacific Northwest College of Art, Portland, Oregon

== Publications ==
- Kennedy, Kristan (2009). F.W.P.C.Y. Jank Editions, Publication Studio. Archived from the original on 2014-03-03.
