= Under the Radar Festival =

Theater festival in New York City

Under the Radar Festival aka RADAR
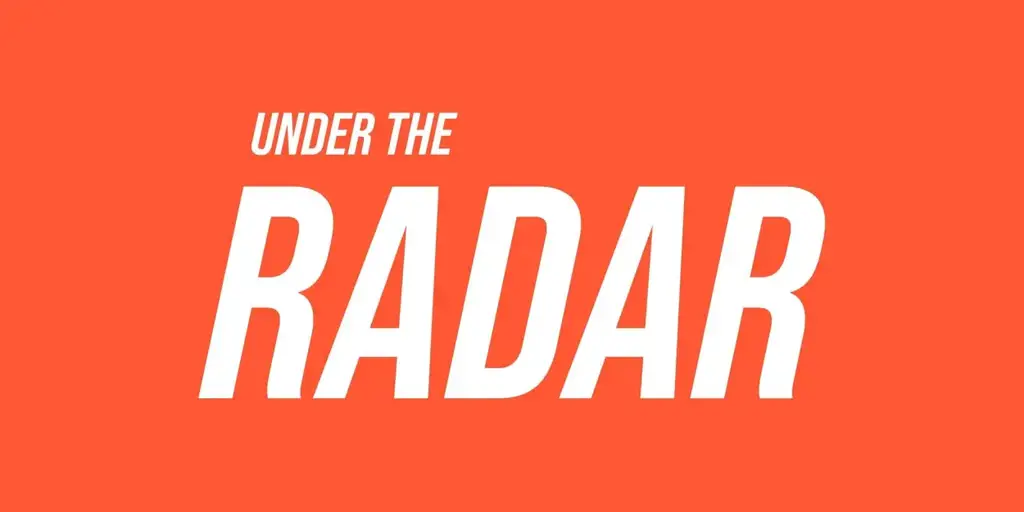
- Under the Radar Logo, circa 2023
- Status: Active
- Genre: Theatre festival
- Frequency: Annually
- Location: New York City
- Country: United States
- Inaugurated: 2005; 21 years ago
- Founder: Mark Russell
- Website: utrfest.org

The Under the Radar Festival is an internationally sourced experimental theater festival based in New York City, founded in 2005 by Mark Russell. Russell was the former artistic director of P.S. 122 for over twenty years, Guest Artistic Director for the Portland Institute for Contemporary Art's Time-Based Art Festival from 2006 to 2008, and is currently on the faculty of Columbia University. The first Under the Radar Festival took place at St. Ann's Warehouse in 2005. From 2006 to 2022, Under the Radar had its headquarters at the Public Theater.

In 2021, Under the Radar was canceled and replaced by a virtual event due to the COVID-19 pandemic. The Festival was subsequently canceled in 2022 due to "multiple disruptions related to the rapid community spread of the Omicron variant". In mid-2023, Oskar Eustis, artistic director of The Public Theater, announced the indefinite suspension of the Under the Radar Festival at The Public for "entirely financial" reasons.

Under the Radar was almost immediately revived in collaboration with the NYC production company ArKtype. The 2024 iteration of the Festival ran from January 5 to January 21, presenting more than 180 performances of 17 distinct productions at 11 different theaters across Brooklyn and Manhattan, including Brooklyn Academy of Music, Lincoln Center, Theatre for a New Audience, La MaMa Experimental Theatre Club, Japan Society (Manhattan), the Abrons Arts Center at Henry Street Settlement, BRIC Arts Media, New York Live Arts, Skirball Center for the Performing Arts, St. Ann's Warehouse, Mabou Mines, and The Invisible Dog Art Center. Additional programming as part of the 2024 Festival included a Symposium featuring keynote conversations with Jeremy O. Harris, Ravi Jain, Hana Sharif, and Kaneza Schall; a "Coming Attractions" artistic pitch session; a six show "UFO" works-in-progress performance calendar; and an "Anti-Misogynoir Disco" dance party at Lincoln Center spotlighting local Black women DJs, including Erica "Twelve45" Blunt, DJ Shannon, Lady NiK and Miss Hap. The 2024 season was a critical and commercial success, selling out the vast majority of its performances.

== General references ==
- Del Signore, John. "Mark Russell, Under the Radar Festival". Interview with Mark Russell. Gothamist, January 10, 2008. Accessed January 10, 2008.
- "Intimate But Global: Mark Russell on the Return of Under the Radar". Interview with Mark Russell. American Theatre, January 10, 2024. Accessed January 10, 2024.
- "January Is Experimental Theater Month", The New Yorker, December 22, 2023. Accessed January 10, 2024.
- "Jan Arts NYC and Under the Radar Festival",WNYC (blog), January 02, 2023. Accessed January 10, 2024.
