= Karin Clarke =

American painter

Karin Andrea Clarke
- Education: University of Oregon (BA)
- Known for: Karin Clarke Gallery
- Style: Impressionism
- Children: 2
- Parents: Mark Clarke (father); Margaret Coe (mother)
- Relatives: Descendants of Robert Coe

Karin Clarke is an American art curator, gallerist, and impressionist painter. She is the owner of the Karin Clarke Gallery in Eugene, Oregon.

== Biography ==
Clarke grew up in Eugene, Oregon. She is the daughter of Margaret Coe and Mark Clarke, both prominent artists from Oregon. Her family is a multi-generational artist family. Her grandfather Salem businessman C. Claire Coe was also an artist and a jazz musician who played trumpet in the Kansas State Agricultural College band. Clarke's brother is also a jazz trumpeter. She graduated from South Eugene High School in 1987 and went on to attend the University of Oregon (UO) where she earned a BA in theater arts in 1991. At UO, she was the stage manager and assistant director of Elmatha's Apology.

After graduation, she relocated to Portland, Oregon, to pursue an acting career. She appear in a television commercial and then decided that auditioning was too brutal and returned to Eugene where she attended Lane Community College for graphic arts and worked briefly as a freelance graphic designer. When this was unsuccessful, she considered pursuing graduate studies in fine art at UO. In 200, she showcased her watercolor paintings at a benefit auction for Lane Shelter Care. While working toward a new career painting, she was wait staff at Marché, an upscale French restaurant. Clarke stood out among the staff there at six-feet tall.

=== Painting and art curation ===
In the spring of 2002, she spent three months in Italy painting with her mother. Afterward, she put painting on hold to open the Karin Clarke Gallery in 2002 and to start a family. Soon after, in March 2003, Clarke's paintings of the countryside of West Salem, Oregon, were showcased in an exhibition at Mary Lou Zeek Gallery in Salem, Oregon, with her mother's work. Clarke paints with acrylic and oil on paper and canvas, and mixes in watercolor and charcoal. She paints en plein air and then reworks the paintings after they've dried in her studio. She was influenced by her mother's style. The Jacobs Gallery, also in Eugene, featured Clarke and her parents' work in a 2004 showcase called "Art in the Family."

After not painting for many years while she focused on her gallery, she decided to focus again on painting. In 2018, she showcased her own paintings during a trip to Northern Italy and France. She decided not to rework some of them, including a piece showcasing French buildings in Paris. In 2019, she advocated to address the gender pay gap in art with an all-women show, and she works hard to ensure women artists are not undervaluing their work.

She had another showcase of her work in 2020, in which she focused on impressionism during a 2019 residency at Château d'Orquevaux. Her work included impressions of the exterior and interior of the grounds, and included a self-portrait. In 2021, she had a second residency at the Chateau, in which she focused on the 18th century French interior architecture. She showed the work in an exhibition with local painter Adam Grosowsky's paintings of Ukraine.

=== Family ===
She and her ex-husband bought the home of Frank Okada, which had a painter's studio and Okada's blank canvases. In 2006, they had their first child. They taught her sign language before she could speak. Their second child, a son, was born in 2009. In the summer of 2011, Clarke closed the gallery due to financial issues and personal difficulties. Their son died of a brain tumor later that year. In 2025, their daughter died after an aggressive battle with childhood alveolar rhabdomyosarcoma. She was 19 and was planning to work with children.
