= Marie Watt =

American contemporary artist (born 1967)

- Born: 1967 (age 58–59); Seattle, Washington, US
- Citizenship: Seneca Nation of New York and United States
- Education: MFA, Yale University School of Art; BS Willamette University; AFA Institute of American Indian Arts
- Known for: installation, printmaking
- Notable work: Blanket Stories
- Awards: 2025 Heinz Award; 2024 Herb Alpert Award; 2021 Arts and Letters Award; 2009 Bonnie Bronson Award; 2005 Betty Bowen Award
- Patrons: Willamette University; Seattle City Light; Portland Community College
- Website: mariewattstudio.com

Marie Watt (born 1967) is a contemporary artist living and working in Portland, Oregon. Enrolled in the Seneca Nation of Indians, Watt has created work primarily with textile arts and community collaboration centered on diverse Native American themes.

== Background ==
Marie Watt was born in 1967 in Seattle, Washington. She majored in Speech Communications and Art at Willamette University in Salem, Oregon. She also explored museum studies at the Institute of American Indian Arts in Santa Fe. She holds an AFA degree from the Institute of American Indian Arts, a BS degree from Willamette University and an MFA degree in Painting and Printmaking from Yale University. Watt is a member of the Turtle Clan of the Seneca Nation and her father's family were Wyoming ranchers. These two factors in her background have influenced her artwork; Watt describes herself as "half Cowboy and half Indian."

== Artwork ==
Watt works primarily with blankets as a material in her installation and collaborative works. She also prints lithography. For her sculpture and installation, she uses a variety of materials, including everyday objects, as well as textiles, alabaster, slate, and cornhusks. She cites Pop art, Abstract Expressionism, and indigenous visual traditions as sources for her work. Watt had a studio in Portland, Oregon and started experimenting with materials, such as corn husk, then began experimenting with woven blankets. In 2002, her stone sculpture Pedestrian was installed along the east bank of the Willamette River in Portland. Her work has appeared in several exhibitions in the Pacific Northwest.

Watt involves community effort when creating artworks. Her project Blanket Stories: Transportation Object, Generous Ones at the Tacoma Art Museum involved creating large-scale installations out of blankets donated by the community. Not only are the blankets the medium but "Watt believes that blankets provide access to social connections, historical traditions, and cross-cultural meanings." Watt hosts sewing circles, groups who gather and work such as with the piece Forget me not: Mothers and Sons in which they constructed portraits of servicemen (and one woman) from Oregon killed in the Iraqi war.

== Career ==
In September 2004, as part of the Continuum 12 artists series, an exhibit of her work opened in New York City and the George Gustav Heye Center of the National Museum of the American Indian. The exhibit included Blanket Stories, a sculpture made of two towers of wool blankets, with each stack sewn together with a central thread. She collected the blankets over several years, including many Hudson's Bay point blankets that were given to Native Americans in trade by the Hudson's Bay Company during the 19th century.

In 2011, the Bill & Melinda Gates Foundation commissioned Watt to produce a site-specific artwork for their Seattle campus. The work, entitled Blanket Stories: Matriarch, Guardian and Seven Generations, is a 14-foot column of wool blankets from all over the world and is located in the building's lobby. Describing how the materials fit this specific location, Watt wrote, "It's the first column I've made with the explicit goal of collecting and integrating blankets from around the world, echoing the Foundation's global mission; the column will be constructed of reclaimed blankets and reclaimed cedar, in resonance with the campus' goal of attaining LEED Gold certification."

In 2014, 350 people contributed to an outdoor sculpture at Tacoma Art Museum. The towers she made were cast in bronze and she posted a micro-website with stories behind each blanket. Watt listens to her material and pulls from a deep sense of community and narrative to create works with history. Her works are both figurative and abstract.

From 2017 to 2023, Watt served as a member of the board of directors for VoCA (Voices in Contemporary Art), a non-profit organization dedicated to the preservation of contemporary art.

In 2025, Watt was selected to collaborate with artist and Chicago native Nick Cave (artist) on an installation for the Obama Presidential Center in Chicago.

Watt served as an instructor at Portland Community College from 1997–2004, and was the coordinator of its Northview Gallery. She is represented by PDX Contemporary Art in Portland, Oregon, Catharine Clark Gallery in San Francisco, California, and Marc Straus Gallery in New York City, New York.

== Selected exhibitions ==
- Vantage Point: The Contemporary Native Art Collection. National Museum of the American Indian, Smithsonian Institution. (2010)
- Unsuspected Possibilities: Leonardo Drew, Sarah Oppenheimer, and Marie Watt. SITE Santa Fe. (2015)
- Indelible Ink: Native Women, Printmaking, Collaboration. University of New Mexico Art Museum. (2020)
- Making Knowing: Craft in Art, 1950–2019. Whitney Museum of Art. (2019–2022)
- Spirit in the Land. Nasher Museum of Art at Duke University. (2023)
- Spirit in the Land. Pérez Art Museum Miami. (2024)
- Marie Watt: Land Stitches Water Sky. Carnegie Museum of Art. (2024)

== Awards and fellowships ==
- 2005 Eiteljorg Museum Artist Fellowship
- 2005 Seattle Art Museum Betty Bowen Award
- 2006 Joan Mitchell Foundation Fellowship
- 2007 Anonymous Was A Woman Award
- 2009 Bonnie Bronson Fellowship
- 2017 Hallie Ford Fellowship in the Visual Arts
- 2019 Harpo Foundation Visual Arts Fellowship
- 2024 Herb Alpert Award in the Arts
- 2025 Heinz Award

== Selected Collections ==
- Albright-Knox Gallery (Buffalo, NY)
- Denver Art Museum (Denver, CO)
- Detroit Institute of Arts (Detroit, MI)
- Eiteljorg Museum of American Indians and Western Art (Indianapolis, IN)
- The Metropolitan Museum of Art (New York, NY)
- The National Gallery of Art (Washington, DC)
- National Gallery of Canada (Ottawa, Ontario, CA)
- Portland Art Museum (Portland, OR)
- Smithsonian American Art Museum, Renwick Gallery (Washington, DC)
- Smithsonian National Museum of the American Indian (Washington, DC)
- Seattle Art Museum (Seattle, WA)
- Whitney Museum of American Art (New York, NY)
- Yale University Art Gallery (New Haven, CT)
