= Fernanda D'Agostino =

American artist

- Education: George Washington University
- Alma mater: The Corcoran School
- Known for: Personal, societal and environmental concerns
- Notable work: Urban Hydrology
- Awards: Bonnie Bronson Fellowship
- Website: Fernanda D'Agostino's website

Fernanda D'Agostino is an American artist and sculptor from Portland, Oregon. Her 30-year career includes works that "integrated personal, societal and environmental concerns" into public art installations. Her new media works frequently incorporate technically sophisticated interactive elements.

D'Agostino was awarded a Bonnie Bronson Fellowship in 1995, a Flintridge Foundation Award for visual artists in 2002, and an Oregon Arts Commission Fellowship in 2016 among other honors.

Monographs on D'Agostino's work have been published twice by The Art Gym, Offering: An installation in 1989 and Method of Loci in 2013. Her work is held in the collections of the Museum of Fine Arts, Houston, the Yellowstone Art Museum, and the Missoula Art Museum.

== Career ==
D'Agostino studied at George Washington University/The Corcoran School, earned her BS in Education at the College of New Jersey in 1973 and her MFA in Sculpture from the University of Montana in 1984.

D'Agostino's work has been exhibited nationally and internationally, including at the Hermitage Museum in St. Petersburg, Russia in Russia's largest annual New Media Festival, ‘CYBERFEST’ in 2012.

In 2013, The Art Gym presented a retrospective exhibition of D'Agostino's work, The Method of Loci which was described in Artforum as "a feast of sensory experience and symbolic power."

Her video installation, Borderline, is the first encountered in the 2019 exhibition at the Portland Art Museum entitled The map is not the territory, "the central event for the Center for Northwest Art [that] is the Arlene and Harold Schnitzer Curator of Northwest Art, Grace Kook-Anderson’s reimagining of its Contemporary Northwest Art Awards (CNAA) exhibition." Critic Laurel Reed-Pavic called it, "a standout show."

== Public art works ==
D’Agostino has been commissioned to make many major public works of art.

Garden of Strength, 2008, is installed at the Mayfair Community Center in the Mayfair neighborhood of San Jose, California. It was inspired by the diversity, and the rich cultural history, of the Mayfair area and by the spirit of growth and renewal embodied in the flourishing Mayfair Community Garden adjacent to the site.

Intellectual Ecosystem is located at the Portland State University Associated Student Recreation Center and was noted as one of 2011's 40 best public artworks in the United States and Canada by the Americans for the Arts “Public Art Year in Review.”.

Urban Hydrology is a series of twelve outdoor 2009 granite sculptures installed along the Portland Transit Mall, part of the City of Portland and Multnomah County Public Art Collection courtesy of the Regional Arts & Culture Council.

Celestial Navigation is an 18-foot-tall (5.5 m) glass and metal sculpture of a navigational quadrant in the International Boulevard plaza of SeaTac/Airport light rail station.

Fluid Dynamics is on the Waterfront Bay Trail at 66th Avenue in Oakland, California commissioned by the City of Oakland and East Bay Regional Park District.
