= Karin Clarke Gallery =

- Established: 2002
- Location: 760 Willamette Street, Eugene, Oregon, USA
- Coordinates: 44.051518°N 123.0929094°W
- Type: Art gallery
- Curator: Karin Clarke
- Website: karinclarkegallery.com

Karen Clarke at the Gordon
- Established: 2021
- Location: 590 Pearl Street, Suite 105, Eugene, Oregon, USA
- Type: Art gallery annex

Karin Clarke Gallery is a fine art gallery located in Eugene, Oregon, owned by artist Karin Clarke. It was originally opened in 2002, but closed due to slow sales in June 2011. For the subsequent year it operated inside The Art Annex, another Eugene art gallery, where it was robbed during its opening reception. It opened again as its own structure in Fall 2012. It is considered an essential element of the city's status as an "art town" and a "museum-quality" showcase of Pacific Northwest art.

The first Eugene Biennial Juried Art Show as held at the gallery in 2016. The show replaced the previous Mayor's Art Show.

Clarke opened an annex to the gallery in 2021 at the Gordon Hotel.

== History ==
On a visit to Italy with her mother, painter Margaret Coe, Karin Clarke was inspired to open an art gallery to sell the work of her mother, her father Mark Clarke, and other regional artists. Coe said that during her years of painting with her husband, she had hoped Eugene would become a "first generation art scene" that would draw tourists to the city. Clarke said that it was something her family had discussed for years, having generations of artists in the family. Her grandfather C. Claire Coe, a businessman, had also been an artist and a jazz musician who played in the Kansas State Agricultural College band. Clarke's brother is also a jazz musician.

In September 2002, she opened the gallery on Willamette Street near another gallery, which she said was not for competition, but rather to draw people interested in art to a particular area of Eugene in what she hoped would become a cluster of art galleries. The gallery grossed $17,000 on its opening, which featured an exhibition of her parents' paintings.

The gallery only sells high-end art that costs thousands of dollars, the main customers being art collectors. During its first ten years, it sold the works of David McCosh, Carl Hall, and other prominent Oregon artists. As a result, over the subsequent decade, sales were slow, and eventually Clarke was forced to close the gallery due to financial troubles. During its closer, she ran her business through expeditions inside of The Art Annex, another local art gallery. During her opening reception and first exhibition of ceramic art, a Faye Nakurama standing piece was stolen.

After a year inside another art gallery, Clarke was able to re-open again as a standalone gallery. The building has two walls made entirely of glass so that the artwork can be seen from the street and from the businesses that face the other side. The opening show was by painter Adam Grosowsky in fall 2012. Clarke's showing of a local artist "legitimized" Eugene's art scene.

When the non-profit gallery inside the Hult Center for the Performing Arts closed in 2016, the annual Mayor's Art Show also ended. Clarke offered her business as the inaugural site for the proposed Biennial Juried Art Show. She said that losing the show would create a gap that was an important part of arts in the city. A group show without any business revenue was unusual for Clarke, which featured more than 30 artists competing for prizes. In 2019, she advocated to address the gender pay gap in art with an all-women show, and she works hard to ensure women artists are not undervaluing their work.

During the COVID-19 pandemic Clarke filmed the expeditions and distributed them online in lieu of in-person visits. The success of virtual art gallery shows resulted in an uptick of customers and the opening of an annex of her gallery in 2021 at the Gordon Hotel on Pearl Street.
