= Pat Boas =

American artist

- Education: MFA, Portland State University; BFA, Pacific Northwest College of Art; BA, University of Akron
- Known for: Painting, Drawing, Contemporary Art
- Awards: Bonnie Bronson Fellowship; Juror's Award, Portland Art Museum
- Website: patboas.com

Pat Boas is an American contemporary artist. She holds a Bachelor of Fine Arts degree from Pacific Northwest College of Art and a Master of Fine Arts degree from Portland State University, where she currently teaches and serves as the director of the School of Art + Design.

== Career ==
Boas' drawings, paintings, prints and digital projects explore the act of reading and the obliteration and confusion of meaning in language. Her work was exhibited in the 2016 Portland Biennial, curated by Michelle Grabner. From 2002 to 2006, Boas was a contributing editor for Artweek and has also been an art critic for Artweek, Art Papers, and artUS.

== Teaching ==
Boas teaches in the Master of Fine Arts in Contemporary Art Practice program at Portland State University in Portland, Oregon and, from 2007 until 2012, served as the program's coordinator. Her pedagogy frequently fosters exchange between practices in art and writing. She regularly teaches a graduate seminar on the artist as writer and, in 2012, she began the publication [STUDIO] with Kristan Kennedy and Lisa Radon, in which students in the Portland State University Contemporary Art Practice MFA program respond to works, lectures, and studio meetings from visiting artists.

== Awards and accolades ==
- 2014 – Regional Arts & Culture Council Artist Project Grant for collaborative drawing with Linda Hutchins and Linda Austin
- 2012 – Bonnie Bronson Fellowship
- 2012 – Pollock-Krasner Foundation Fellowship for Byrdcliffe Artist Colony Residency
- 2012 – Ford Family Foundation Golden Spot Award for Crow’s Shadow Artist Residency
- 2011 – Ford Family Foundation Connective Conversations Critic’s Studio Visit Award, School of Architecture and Allied Arts, University of Oregon
- 2009 – Regional Arts & Culture Council Project Grant for exhibition catalog
- 2009 – Grant for Record Record catalog, Harold and Arlene Schnitzer CARE Foundation
- 2006 – Jurors’ Award, 2006 Oregon Biennial, Portland Art Museum
- 2005 – Professional Development Grant, Regional Arts & Culture Council
- 2005 – Professional Development Grant, Pacific Northwest College of Art
- 2002 – Artist Project Grant, Regional Arts & Culture Council
- 2001 – Drawing Residency, Oregon College of Art & Craft
- 2001 – Installation Art Space Grant, Regional Arts & Culture Council, Portland, OR

== Work in collections ==
- Bonnie Bronson Collection
- RACC Portable Works Collection
