= Melanie Manchot =

German photographer (born 1966)

- Born: 1966 (age 59–60); Witten
- Education: New York University
- Occupations: photographer, visual artist

Melanie Manchot (born 1966 in Witten) is a London-based visual artist who works with photography, film, video and installation as part of a performative and participatory practice. Her projects often explore specific sites and public spaces to locate notions of individual and collective identities. The work investigates particular gestures and forms of movement or activities that become the marker of a group or community.

== Early life and education ==
Born in Witten, Germany in 1966, Manchot studied in New York at New York University (1988–1989) before moving to London to continue her studies at City University and later at the Royal College of Art. From 1992 until 2005 Manchot was a lecturer at various institutions including Goldsmiths College of Art, Central St Martins, London College of Communication and Middlesex University.

== Work and exhibitions ==
Manchot first came to prominence in the mid- to late nineties for an early series of portraits taken entirely of her mother who she photographed naked both in the studio and against a variety of city- and landscapes. When first exhibited the works received widespread attention and contributed to a growing debate around the representation of women, age and contested notions of body politics.

Since 2000 Manchot's practice has increasingly incorporated film and video installation with the frame of reference expanding to include archive film, experimental film and cinematic history. Manchot's methodology is based around participatory processes, often involving groups or communities and creating expanded portraits of people, both their individual and social selfs.

Manchot's work has been widely exhibited in galleries, museums and film festivals internationally. Notable solo exhibitions include Celebration (Cyprus Street), Whitechapel Gallery, London (2010); Portland Institute for Contemporary Art, Oregon; Moscow Girls und Andere Geschichten, Haus am Waldsee, Berlin (2006), Melanie Manchot, Cornerhouse, Manchester (2002) and Stories from Russia, The Photographers' Gallery, London (2005). In 2023, Manchot's first feature film, Stephen, was released, a 'docudrama' in which 'members of the Liverpool addiction and trauma recovery community partake in a Freudian re-enactment', in which 'the line between fact and fiction is thin to vanishing'.

Manchot has also exhibited extensively in group shows around the world at institutes such as MOTinternational, London; Centre for Contemporary Arts, Glasgow; Moscow Museum of Modern Art; Istanbul Biennal (2009) and the New Forest Pavilion, 52nd International Art Exhibition – Venice Biennale (2007).

Manchot is a trustee of The Photographers' Gallery, London. She is also on the editorial board of numerous art journals. In 2020, Manchot was awarded an Honorary Fellowship of the Royal Photographic Society, Bristol.

== Monographs ==
- Look at You Loving Me, Katja Blomberg, Val Williams and Friedrich Reinhardt, Switzerland, 1998, ISBN 978-3-7245-1039-0
- Love is a Stranger, Klaus Honnef, Janet Hand and Stuart Horodner, Prestel, Germany, 2001, ISBN 3-7913-2532-9
- Moscow Girls, Katja Blomberg and John Slyce, Haus am Waldsee, Germany, 2006
- 100. Engelberg Mountain Railways, Switzerland, 2013

== Other publications ==
- Musee D'art Contemparain Du Val-De-Marne, France, 2010, ISBN 978-2-916324-58-6
- let+s dance, MAC/VAL
- The Art of Walking, a field guide, David Evans, Black Dog Publishing, UK, 2012, ISBN 978-1-907317-87-3
- Situation(s), MAC/VAL Musee D'art Contemparain Du Val-De-Marne, France, 2012, ISBN 978-2-916324-69-2
- Ageing selves and everyday life in the north of England, Years in the making. Cathrine Degnen, New Ethnographies, Manchester University Press. United Kingdom and USA, 2012, ISBN 978-0-7190-8308-2
- Walk On, From Richard Long to Janet Cardiff, 40 years of Art Walking, Mike Collier and Cynthia Morrison-Bell, Art Editions North. UK, 2013, ISBN 978-1-906832-08-7
- Participa(c)tion. MAC/VAL Musee D'art Contemparain Du Val-De-Marne, France, 2013 ISBN 978-2-916324-76-0
- History of Photography, Volume 37, Number 3. Routeledge, Taylor & Francis, United Kingdom, 2013. ISSN 0308-7298
- Feminist Studies, Volume 40, Number 1, Ashwini Tambe, USA, 2014, ISSN 0046-3663/301.412
