= Margaret Coe =

American painter (born 1941)

- Born: 1941 (age 84–85)
- Education: University of Oregon (BA, MFA)
- Style: Impressionism
- Spouse: Mark Clarke
- Children: Karin Clarke, Tim Clarke
- Relatives: Descendants of Robert Coe

Margaret Coe (born 1941) is an American painter known for her Impressionist art works painted en plein air in Oregon. Her paintings are preserved in the Oregon Legislative Assembly's One Percent for Art Collection, at the Jordan Schnitzer Museum of Art, and in the Smithsonian Libraries and Archives. Crater Lake #2 (2010) is on display at the Oregon State Capitol.

== Biography ==
Coe, also known as Peg, was born in Coats, Kansas to Curtis and Pearl Coe (née Haney). She is the 8th great granddaughter of Robert Coe, a New England Colonist and public official. When she was 12 years of age, her family moved to Oregon. She began painting from a young age leading her to attend the University of Oregon (UO) for Fine art, first obtaining a Bachelor of Arts and then a Master of Fine Arts in 1978. She studied under David McCosh and Frank Okada. She taught art at the Maude Kerns Art Center, Lane Community College, and UO. Laura Ross-Paul is a contemporary of Coe.

She met her husband, artist Mark Clarke, at UO. They exhibited many of their paintings together beginning in the 1960s. Clarke was the curator of the University of Oregon Museum of Art for more than twenty years. He died on January 11, 2016. Their daughter, Karin Clarke, owns the Karin Clarke Gallery and its annex in Eugene. Their son Tim Clarke is a jazz musician.

== Paintings ==
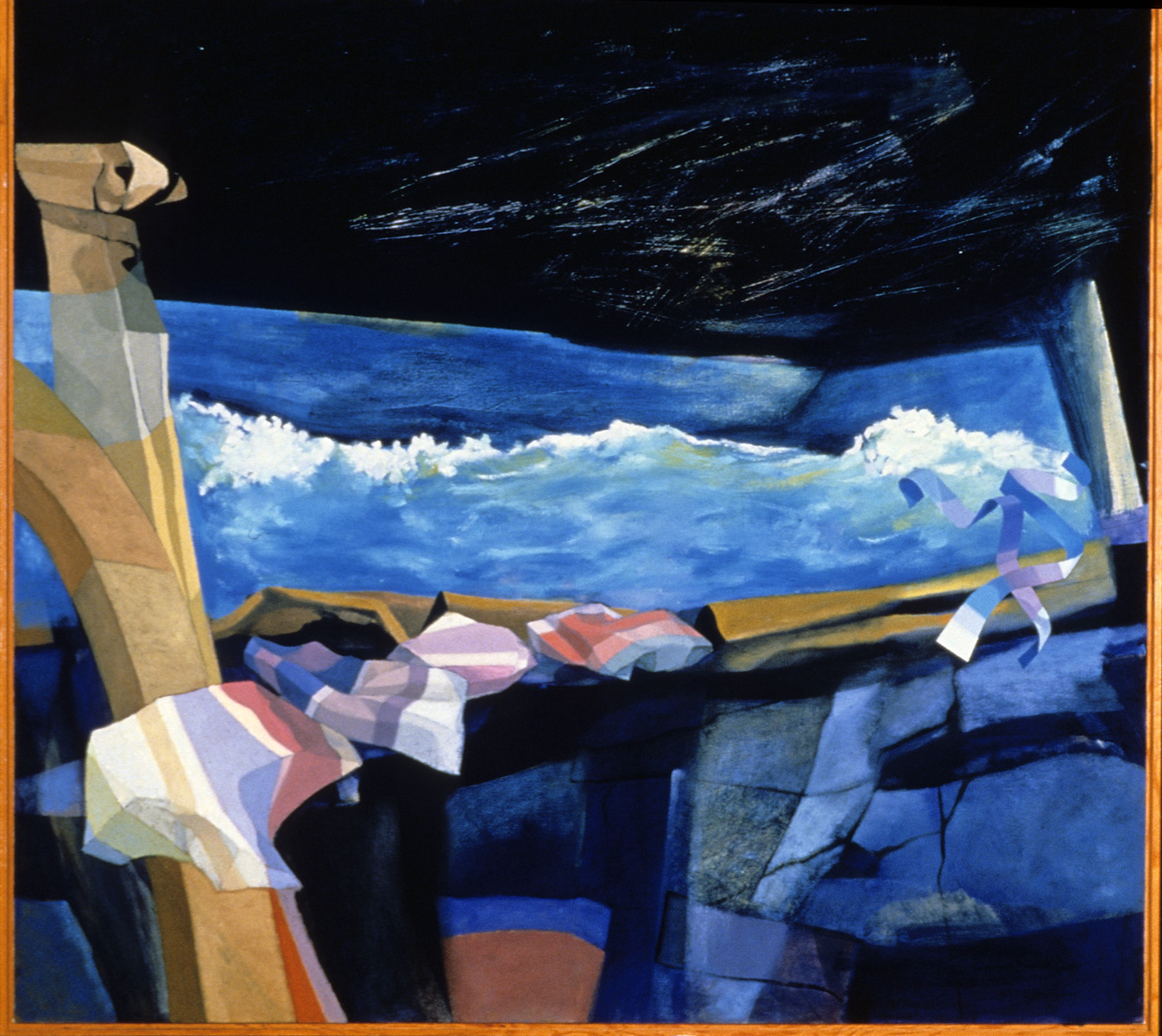
Steps to the Sea (1986) on display at the University of Oregon

Coe's chosen medium is oil on canvas. Her style is impressionist. She paints plein air landscapes from observation as a base before she returns to her studio in Laurel Hill. In her studio she re-interprets the pieces retrospectively. She was influenced by Charles Heaney and Clayton Sumner Price, both Oregon-based modernist painters.

Coe is one of Eugene, Oregon's most recognized artists. Eugene Weekly said she is one of the artists which has "influenced generations of artists as well as the direction of painting in the region."

Coe and Clarke were honored with a 6-month retrospective in 2017—2018 by the Jordan Schnitzer Museum of Art. The curator for the museum said it was a "dream project" for the museum. A book created by the museum to accompany the exhibition, Mark Clarke and Margaret Coe: our lives in paint, is archived at the Smithsonian Libraries and Archives.

Seven of her paintings were acquired by the Oregon Legislative Assembly in the One Percent for Art Collection, the first law in the United States setting aside funds to purchase and preserve artwork by recognized artists in the state. Crater Lake #2 (2010), Coe's interpretation of the landscape of Crater Lake National Park, is hanging in the Oregon State Capitol. Several pieces are in colleges and government buildings around the state.

Coe's paintings are also in collections at the Hallie Ford Museum of Art, the Coos Art Museum, and Morbihan.

== Awards ==
- Oregon Arts Commission Individual Artist Fellowship Award, 1986
- Eugene Arts and Letters Award, 2006
- Alfred and Trafford Klots Residency at Rochefort-en-Terre, 2004-2006
