= Laura Ross-Paul =

American painter (born 1950)

- Born: Laura Ross; 1950 (age 75–76); Portland, Oregon
- Education: Oregon State University; Fort Wright College (BFA); Portland State University (MFA, BS)
- Movement: American Realism
- Website: lauraross-paul.com

Laura Ross-Paul (born 1950) is an American realism painter in the Pacific Northwest known primarily for her work in Oregon. Ross-Paul paints figures using a custom technique using oil paint, resin, and wax. Second Creek (2008) is on display at the Oregon State Capitol, acquired through the One Percent for Art Collection by the Oregon Legislative Assembly.

She was awarded the Bonnie Bronson Fellowship in 2009, after her work was transformed around her experience with breast cancer as the first cryoablation patient in the United States.

== Biography ==
Laura Ross-Paul was born in Portland, Oregon in 1950. Her mother died of breast cancer when she was still a student at Wilson High School at eighteen. After graduating in 1968, Ross-Paul attended Oregon State University (OSU) to study art. While there, she was the political cartoonist and illustrator OSU's Vietnam-era underground anti-war newspaper, The Scab Sheet 10 cents for the Truth. There she met Alex Paul, whom she married in 1970. They moved to Washington, where she earned a Bachelor of Fine Arts in Painting in 1974 from Fort Wright College. She then returned to Oregon, where she attended Portland State University (PSU) and graduated with her Master of Fine Arts in Painting in 1976 and a Bachelor of Science in Arts in 1978.

Ross-Paul taught art at PSU, Lewis and Clark College, Pacific Northwest College of Art, Oregon College of Arts and Crafts, and Hoffman Center for the Arts.

In 2014, Ross-Paul, her husband, and her oncologist, Peter Littrup, published They're Mine and I'm Keeping Them through the self-publishing service CreateSpace, an account of her experience with breast cancer and the first cryoablation patient in the United States. Ross-Paul illustrated the book.

== Paintings ==
Ross-Paul paints in the genre of American Realism with a unique twist referred to as "Supernatural Realism" by th Seattle Post-Intelligencer. She specializes in figure painting, using Pacific Northwest landscapes as metaphorical backgrounds. She paints with oil and watercolor paints in studio. She also adds wax and resin to her oil paintings using a technique she invented. Her style was inspired by Mark Tobey, Kenneth Callahan, and Morris Graves, and has been compared to Claude Monet and Caspar David Friedrich by 1859 Oregon's Magazine. The Oregonian referred to her as a "venerable [figure] from Portland's long established vanguard" of art. She is a contemporary of Margaret Coe.

Twelve of Ross-Paul's paintings were purchased by the Oregon Legislative Assembly in One Percent for Art Collection, the first law of its kind that dedicates tax dollars to acquiring works from the state's most well-known artists. Her 2008 painting, Second Creek, is hanging at the Oregon State Capitol.

== Awards and accolades ==
- Bonnie Bronson Fellowship (2008)
- Oregon Arts Commission fellowship
