= Urban Hydrology =

Sculpture series in Portland, Oregon, U.S.

- One of twelve pieces of Urban Hydrology in 2016
- Artist: Fernanda D'Agostino
- Year: 2009
- Type: Sculpture
- Medium: Granite
- Subject: Diatoms
- Location: Portland, Oregon, United States; 45.511°N 122.683°W
- Owner: City of Portland and Multnomah County Public Art Collection courtesy of the Regional Arts & Culture Council

Urban Hydrology is a series of twelve outdoor 2009 granite sculpture by Fernanda D'Agostino, installed along the Portland Transit Mall in Portland, Oregon, United States. The work is part of the City of Portland and Multnomah County Public Art Collection courtesy of the Regional Arts & Culture Council, which administers the work.

== Description ==
Fernanda D'Agostino's Urban Hydrology was installed along three blocks of Southwest Sixth Avenue (between Hall and Mill) on the Portland Transit Mall, adjacent to the Portland State University campus, in 2009. It features a series of twelve carved granite stones, each measuring 5 feet (1.5 m) x 5 feet (1.5 m) x 1 foot (0.30 m), bioswales, and native plants. The sculptures are based on scanning electron microscope photographs of diatoms used for determining water quality in urban waterways. The $84,000 project was commissioned by TriMet; other partners included the Environmental Studies Department at Portland State University and the city's Water Bureau.

== See also ==
- 2001 in art
