= Dawn Cerny =

American visual artist

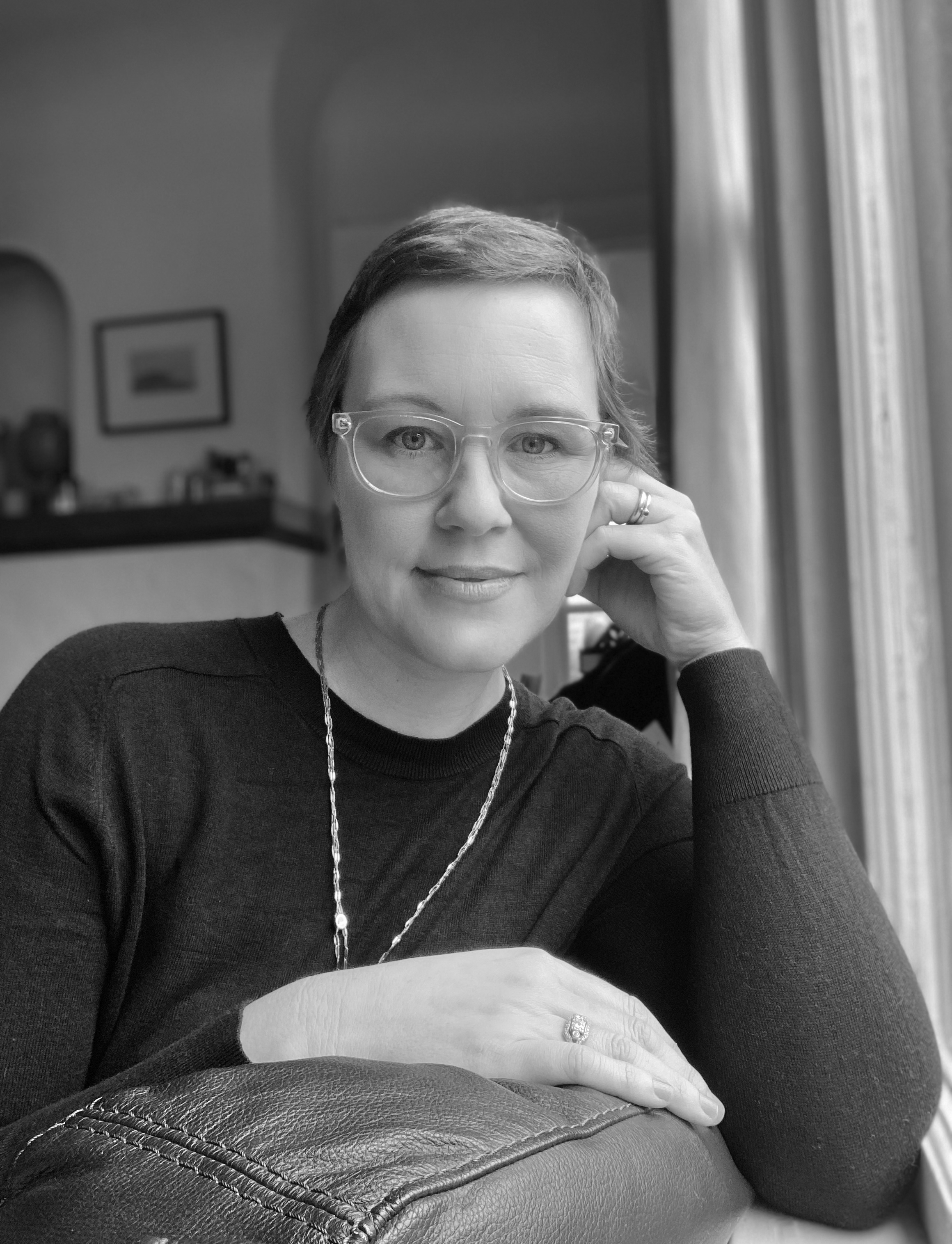
- Portrait of Dawn Cerny
- Born: Carpinteria, California, U.S.
- Education: BFA, Cornish College of the Arts (2002); MFA, Milton Avery Graduate School of the Arts at Bard College (2012)
- Known for: Sculpture, visual arts
- Movement: Contemporary art

Dawn Cerny is an American visual artist known for her sculptural works that explore domesticity, humor, and the human body through abstract, furniture-like forms.

Cerny was born in Carpinteria, California, and currently lives in Seattle, Washington. She earned her Bachelor of Fine Arts from Cornish College of the Arts in 2002 and her MFA in Sculpture from the Milton Avery Graduate School of the Arts at Bard College in 2012.

Cerny has collaborated with several artists, including Victoria Haven.

== Notable exhibitions ==
- Frye Art Museum, Portmeirion, Seattle, WA (2025)
- Seattle Art Museum, Les Choses, Seattle, WA (2021)
- Portland Art Museum, Dawn Cerny, Portland, OR (2017)
- Henry Art Gallery, Fun. No Fun., Seattle, WA (2017)
