= Samantha Wall =

American artist (born 1977)

- Born: 1977 (age 48–49); Seoul, South Korea
- Website: www.samanthawall.com

Samantha Wall (born 1977, Seoul, South Korea) is a Korean-American visual artist known for her drawings and mixed-media works that explore identity, race, and the female experience. She is based in Portland, Oregon.

Wall was born in Seoul and immigrated to the United States at a young age. She received her MFA in Visual Studies from the Pacific Northwest College of Art in Portland, Oregon, and a BFA in Painting from the University of South Carolina.

== Work ==
Wall's work often features large-scale, expressive portraits of women, rendered in graphite, ink, and watercolor. Her practice explores the psychological and emotional dimensions of identity, particularly as it relates to her experience as a biracial woman. Her subjects frequently include women of color.

In her series Shame on Me, Wall uses conté crayon, charcoal, and graphite to explore introspective emotions such as shame, humiliation, and pride. These works are described as "chronicling of emotions that the body holds," and are intended to expose internal psychological mechanisms.

== Exhibitions ==
Wall has exhibited widely in the United States, including solo exhibitions at:

- The Portland Art Museum
- The Schneider Museum of Art
- The Jordan Schnitzer Museum of Art

== Awards and recognition ==
Wall has received numerous awards and fellowships, including:

- Oregon Arts Commission Individual Artist Fellowship
- Joan Mitchell Foundation MFA Grant
- Hallie Ford Fellowship in the Visual Arts
