= Portland Institute for Contemporary Art =

Contemporary performance and visual arts organization in Portland

Portland Institute for Contemporary Art (PICA)

- Location within Portland, Oregon
- Established: 1995
- Location: 15 NE Hancock St, Portland, Oregon, USA
- Coordinates: 45.53680°N 122.66828°W,
- Directors: Reuben Roqueñi (Executive Director); Erin Boberg Doughton and Kristan Kennedy (Artistic Directors)
- Website: http://pica.org

The Portland Institute for Contemporary Art (PICA) is a contemporary performance and visual arts organization in Portland in the U.S. state of Oregon. PICA was founded in 1995 by Kristy Edmunds. Since 2003, it has presented the annual Time-Based Art Festival (TBA) every September in Portland, featuring contemporary and experimental visual art, dance, theatre, film/video, music, and educational and public programs from local, national, and international artists. As of 2023, it is led by Executive Director Reuben Roqueñi and Artistic Directors Erin Boberg Doughton and Kristan Kennedy.

== History ==
PICA was founded in 1995 by Kristy Edmunds, at the time the Director of the Portland Art Museum's "Art on the Edge" program. The organization's exhibition and performance program was built largely around an itinerant model, utilizing vacant space or rented venues throughout the city of Portland rather than programming a single gallery or theatre year-round. The majority of PICA's performance programming was grouped into its annual performance seasons, which it produced for seven years before the organization began presenting the Time-Based Art Festival in 2003. The organization's signature event during this time was an annual costume party fundraiser known as the Dada Ball, which it held from 1996 until 2001 in a variety of vacant spaces throughout the city.

PICA's offices were housed at Boora Architects from its founding until about 2001, and then moved to the headquarters of Wieden+Kennedy in Northwest Portland. PICA housed its offices within those of Wieden & Kennedy until 2012, and operated an additional 2,200 square feet (200 m^{2}) exhibition space in the building until 2004.

In September 2003, PICA began presenting its annual Time-Based Art Festival, a ten-day international festival of contemporary performance and visual art modeled after those in Edinburgh and Adelaide (Fringe or main Festival?). The TBA Festival built upon PICA's itinerant model of utilizing multiple venues around the city, including sites such as the former Washington High School building in Southeast Portland, which would later become Revolution Hall.

In 2012, PICA moved to a leased third floor space on Southwest 10th Avenue, allowing the organization's offices and resource library to also be used a gallery and performance space when programs required it.

On April 19, 2016, PICA announced that the organization was gifted a 20-year no-rent lease on a 16,000 square feet (1,500 m^{2}) building along the North Williams Avenue corridor by donor Allie Furlotti and the Calligram Foundation. In September 2016, PICA began utilizing this space as a box office, performance venue, and gallery for their 2016 TBA Festival while maintaining offices in downtown Portland. In November 2017, PICA's offices were relocated to the renovated Northeast Portland space.

=== Leadership ===
Founder Kristy Edmunds left PICA in 2005 to become artistic director for the Melbourne International Arts Festival. She is now Director at MASS MoCA in western Massachusetts. Mark Russell (producer of The Public Theater's Under the Radar Festival and former director of P.S.122) and Cathy Edwards (former director of programming for the International Festival of Arts and Ideas) operated as the organization's two guest artistic directors from 2006 until 2011. Victoria Frey was appointed PICA’s Executive Director in 2004 and guided PICA through numerous transitions and astounding growth. Under her leadership, PICA presented thousands of artists from around the world; established a home and community hub at our flagship building in Northeast Portland; and developed deep and ongoing relationships with artists, audiences, foundations, partners, and neighbors. Angela Mattox, the former Performing Arts Curator at Yerba Buena Center for the Arts, was hired as the organization's permanent artistic director in 2011. Mattox left PICA in 2017 following the end of that year's Time-Based Art Festival, her sixth as artistic director.

PICA announced on November 28, 2017, that long-time programming staff members Roya Amirsoleymani (previously Director of Community Engagement), Erin Boberg Doughton (previously Performing Arts Program Director), and Kristan Kennedy (previously Visual Art Curator) had been selected as the organization's Artistic Directors. In 2023, Reuben Roqueñi was appointed Executive Director after serving nearly 20 years in arts philanthropy. He was formerly Director of Transformative Change Programs at the Native Arts and Cultures Foundation (NACF), a national organization headquartered in Portland, Oregon.

== Programming ==
=== Performance ===
PICA has presented works from performance artists and musicians such as Philip Glass, Laurie Anderson, Karen Finley, Spalding Gray, Marina Abramović, Miranda July, Mike Daisey, and Reggie Watts, among others.

Since its inception, PICA has programmed both performances and exhibitions, while also hosting educational events such as lectures, public conversations, and artist-led workshops. Its first performance series ran from 1995-1996. PICA ceased its seasonal performance series when it began presenting the Time-Based Art Festival in 2003, though still presents some performances during other parts of the year.

=== Visual Art ===
PICA has presented work by visual artists such as William Pope.L, Matthew Day Jackson, Francis Alÿs, Emily Roysdon, A.L. Steiner, Erika Vogt, Abigail DeVille, Carlos Motta and others. Since 2005, PICA's visual art programming has been curated by Kristan Kennedy.

As with PICA's itinerant model to performance presentation, the organization has not had a single exhibition space for most of its history. From 2000–2004, PICA did run a year-round gallery out of a corner of the Wieden+Kennedy Building in Northwest Portland's Pearl District, designed by early PICA supporter Brad Cloepfil. During that time, visual art curator Stuart Horodner presented work from artists such as Janine Antoni, Dana Schutz, and Melanie Manchot in the space. Horodner left the organization in 2004.

The Time-Based Art Festival has included visual art curated by Kennedy as part of its artistic program since 2006 under the "On Sight" program strand. On Sight exhibition programs often include performance-based or otherwise non-conventional visual art modes in addition to traditional gallery spaces. The exhibition-based visual art projects are generally exhibited for two to four weeks after the conclusion of each year's TBA. In 2016, the On Sight exhibition was titled "Makeup on Empty Space" and included a multi-channel video installation by A.K. Burns, a performance art piece by Keijaun Thomas, a performance by Dylan Mira, and an exhibition-turned-artist-residency by Bunny Brains and collaborators.

== Community Engagement, Education and Public Programs ==
PICA offers a variety of education, outreach, contextual and public programs, often presented in tandem with its artistic programs but sometimes independent of them. As part of the annual TBA Festival, PICA offers an education, engagement, and public programs strand called the "Institute" that brings festival artists, guest scholars, and writers into dialogue. Institute programming includes workshops, discussions, panels, lectures, and (since 2013) the Field Guide series, in which expert facilitates engage in focused workshops and dialogues with members of the public about a particular performance or program.

=== Precipice Fund ===
In 2011, PICA announced that the organization had received money from the Andy Warhol Foundation for the Visual Arts' Regional Regranting Program to create a regranting program for small, artist-led visual art projects that do not otherwise qualify for project support through traditional granting mechanisms. Dubbed the Precipice Fund, PICA began distributing its first round of grants in 2013. As of 2016, $225,000 has been redistributed over three grant periods to 57 projects in the region.

=== Resource Room ===
Since 2000, PICA's offices have included a public reference library known as the Resource Room. The PICA Resource Room collects a variety of art publications, housing over 4,000 books and periodicals on its shelves. The Resource Room also collects video documentation from the organization's 20-year history of artistic presentation. From 2012–2015, the Resource Room Residency gave artists the opportunity to engage with the space and collection of archival materials.

== See also ==
- Culture of Portland, Oregon
