= Lynne Woods Turner =

American contemporary abstract painter (born 1951)

Lynne Woods Turner (born 1951) is an American contemporary abstract painter. She holds a B.A. from Stephens College, Columbia, MO and an M.F.A. from University of Iowa, Iowa City. Stephanie Snyder, curator at the Cooley Gallery at Reed College, describes her work as having "emerge(d) through the artist's passionate exploration of mathematical relationships, natural phenomena, and the visceral responses of the human body." She shows at Greg Kucera Gallery Inc., Seattle, Danese/Corey, New York, and Gallery Joe, Philadelphia. Her work is in numerous public art collections including the MOMA Collection, the Judith Rothschild Foundation and the Fogg Art Museum, Harvard University, and the National Gallery of Art.
