= Lucinda Parker =

American artist (born 1942)

Lucinda Parker (1942) is an American artist living in Portland, Oregon, who has painted public projects in Oregon, Washington and California.

== Early life and education ==
Parker is originally from the Boston area. She grew up in Wayland, Massachusetts, and attended The Putney School.

She earned Bachelor of Arts degree jointly from Reed College and The Museum School (now Pacific Northwest College of Art), and an M.A. from Pratt Institute in Brooklyn.

== Critical reception ==
Art in America's Sue Taylor wrote of Parker's "impressive career that includes ambitious public projects in Oregon, Washington and California".

== Selected exhibitions ==
Portland Art Museum held a mid-career retrospective of Parker's work in 1995, and in 2002, Boise Art Museum held a one-person exhibition of her work.

Parker has public commissions at the Oregon Convention Center, Portland City Hall, and the federal courthouse in Bakersfield, California.

== Collections ==
- Hallie Ford Museum of Art at Willamette University
- Portland Art Museum
- Seattle Art Museum
- Museum of Northwest Art

== Documentary ==
Parker was the subject of a 2014 documentary, Lucinda Parker: Water & Clouds directed by Michael Annus.
