= Time-Based Art Festival =

Portland, Oreogon arts festival

- Status: Active
- Genre: Interdisciplinary art and performance
- Frequency: Yearly
- Locations: Portland, Oregon
- Country: United States
- Years active: 23
- Inaugurated: 2003
- Founder: Kristy Edmunds
- Organiser: Portland Institute for Contemporary Art
- Website: www.pica.org/tba

The Time-Based Art Festival (TBA) is an annual interdisciplinary art and performance festival presented each September in Portland, Oregon by the Portland Institute for Contemporary Art (PICA).

== History ==
TBA is modeled on similar European and Australian Festivals, including the Edinburgh and Adelaide Festivals. It holds events in diverse venues across the city of Portland, OR, through partnerships with the Pacific Northwest College of Art, Reed College, Northwest Film Center, and other local institutions.

The first TBA Festival occurred in 2003; it was curated by Kristy Edmunds, who founded PICA in 1995.

TBA uses a variety of venues across the city for events each year, including the theaters of the Portland'5 Centers for the Arts, BodyVox, Portland State University's Lincoln Hall, among others. From 2009 to 2012, the festival made use of the then-vacant Washington High School building and campus in Southeast Portland as its hub. In 2016, the organization signed a long-term lease on a building along the North Williams Avenue corridor that would serve as a permanent hub for the Festival's late night programming, box office, and provide additional theater and gallery space.

The festival inspired the Austin, Texas-based Fusebox Festival.

== See also ==
- Culture of Portland, Oregon
