= Bora Architects =

Architecture firm in Portland, Oregon, U.S.

- Industry: Architecture
- Founded: 1958
- Area served: Portland, Oregon, U.S.
- Website: bora.co

Bora Architects is an architectural firm based in Portland, Oregon, United States.

== History ==
The company's former name, Boora Architects, was derived from the names of now-retired foundational partners Broome, Oringdulph, O'Toole, Rudolf, and Associates. In 2021, Bora and Ennead Architects' Phil and Penny Knight Campus for Accelerating Scientific Impact at University of Oregon (Eugene, Oregon) was recognized with an American Institute of Architects Education Facility Design Award.

== Governance ==
Amy Donohue has been a principal at the firm since 2007. In April 2017, Becca Cavell, principal of the Hacker firm, joined Bora.
