= BMW Art Car =

Art project

Coordinates: 48.1765°N 11.5591°E

The BMW Art Car Project was introduced by the French racecar driver and auctioneer Hervé Poulain, who wanted to invite an artist to create a canvas on an automobile.

In 1975, Poulain commissioned American artist and friend Alexander Calder to paint the first BMW Art Car. This first example would be a BMW 3.0 CSL which Poulain himself would race in the 1975 24 Hours of Le Mans endurance race.

Since Calder's work of art, many other renowned artists throughout the world have created BMW Art Cars, including David Hockney, Jenny Holzer, Roy Lichtenstein, Robert Rauschenberg, Frank Stella, and Andy Warhol. To date, a total of 20 BMW Art Cars, based on both racing and regular production vehicles, have been created. Frank Stella also made one unofficial art car at the behest of race car driver Peter Gregg. The most recent artist to the join BMW Art Car program is Julie Mehretu in 2024 with her BMW M Hybrid V8. Artists for the BMW Art Car Project are chosen by a panel of international judges.

According to Thomas Girst, who has been in charge of the BMW Art Cars project since 2004, the purpose of the project has changed over time: "In the beginning the cars were raced. There wasn't much of a public relations effort around them... Since then, some of the Art Cars have been used in advertisements to show that BMW is a player in the arts. With the Eliason work, part of what we are doing is raising awareness of alternative and renewable energy sources."

For the 50th birthday of the BMW Art Car Project in 2025, a world tour has been scheduled that will take the art cars to various museums and events around the world.

== BMW Art Cars ==
No.	Photo	Artist	Model	Year
1		Alexander Calder	3.0 CSL	1975
2		Frank Stella	3.0 CSL	1976
3		Roy Lichtenstein	320	1977
4		Andy Warhol	M1 Group 4	1979
5		Ernst Fuchs	635 CSi	1982
6		Robert Rauschenberg	635 CSi	1986
7		Michael Nelson Jagamarra	M3	1989
8		Ken Done	M3 Group A	1989
9		Matazo Kayama	535i	1990
10		César Manrique	730i	1990
11		A. R. Penck	Z1	1991
12		Esther Mahlangu	525i	1991
13		Sandro Chia	M3 DTM Prototype	1992
14		David Hockney	850CSi	1995
15		Jenny Holzer	V12 LMR	1999
16		Olafur Eliasson	H2R	2007
17		Jeff Koons	M3 GT2	2010
18		John Baldessari	M6 GTLM	2016
19		Cao Fei	M6 GT3**	2017
20		Julie Mehretu	M Hybrid V8	2024

** Car shown in the BMW Museum, without the original digital lighting enhancements that were part of the art.

== Miniatures ==
Since 2003, BMW has released the Art Cars (at the time, this encompassed the entire series) as 1:18 scale miniature diecast.

They are sold in limited edition by BMW dealers and shops with the name "museum edition". All of them have an elegant acrylic display and a grey base, iconic package with red box and an "art car" booklet inside. The first two to be released were Alexander Calder's BMW 3.0 CSL and Jenny Holzer's BMW V12 LMR. Initially 3000 copies each were to be produced with an MSRP of $125 (now $145) each. Nowadays there are 18 miniatures, but there are 20 Bmw art cars, simply of 2 there are no miniatures. Only the works of Olafur Eliasson and Cao Fei do not have official miniatures because they are conceptual works.

== Public display ==
In 2009, the Art Cars began a North American tour, starting at the Los Angeles County Museum of Art from February 12–24. The second stop was in New York City from March 24 to April 6, in a special exhibit at Grand Central Terminal held in its Vanderbilt Hall. The Cars were exhibited in México, first in MARCO, Monterrey, and later in Guadalajara and Mexico City. In July 2012 a selection of the cars were presented by the Institute of Contemporary Arts in a Shoreditch car park as part of the London 2012 Festival, entitled Art Drive!.

=== 2025 Cars at the Capital Unloading Incident ===
On September 17, 2025 a delivery driver for Reliable Carriers Inc was pinned under and killed by the Andy Warhol M1 Group 4 Art Car when a winch broke whilst unloading the car from a flatbed. The car was to be featured on Washington, DC's National Mall as part of the "Cars at the Capital", an annual event held by Hagerty where the car added to that years National Historic Vehicle Register is displayed in public for a week. The event was canceled following the incident.

== Unofficial BMW Art Cars ==
In addition to the work commissioned by BMW, other artists have created unofficial BMW art cars. In 1979 racing driver Peter Gregg purchased a BMW M1 Procar and commissioned his friend Frank Stella to paint it for him; this car is the only BMW painted by an artist who was also part of BMW's own Art Car program. and was sold from the Guggenheim Museum to a BMW dealer in Long Island, New York in 2011. The car is part of Stella's "Polar Coordinates" series, created to commemorate Stella's friend Ronnie Peterson who had died in a racing incident at Monza in 1978. In 1990 Keith Haring painted a red BMW Z1 at Hans Mayer Gallery, Düsseldorf. In 1996 Artist Dennis Simon was commissioned to create a BMW Motorsport tribute on the flanks of a 1965 BMW 1800 Ti/SA for BMW's 80th birthday at the Monterey Historics in Laguna Seca, CA. In 2007, Portland's Museum of Contemporary Craft commissioned artist Tom Cramer to paint a 1977 BMW 320i for their grand opening at the DeSoto Building. In 2016, the Cultural Council of Greater Jacksonville commissioned artist Christie Chandler to paint a BMW X6 for their annual awards gala at TPC Sawgrass.

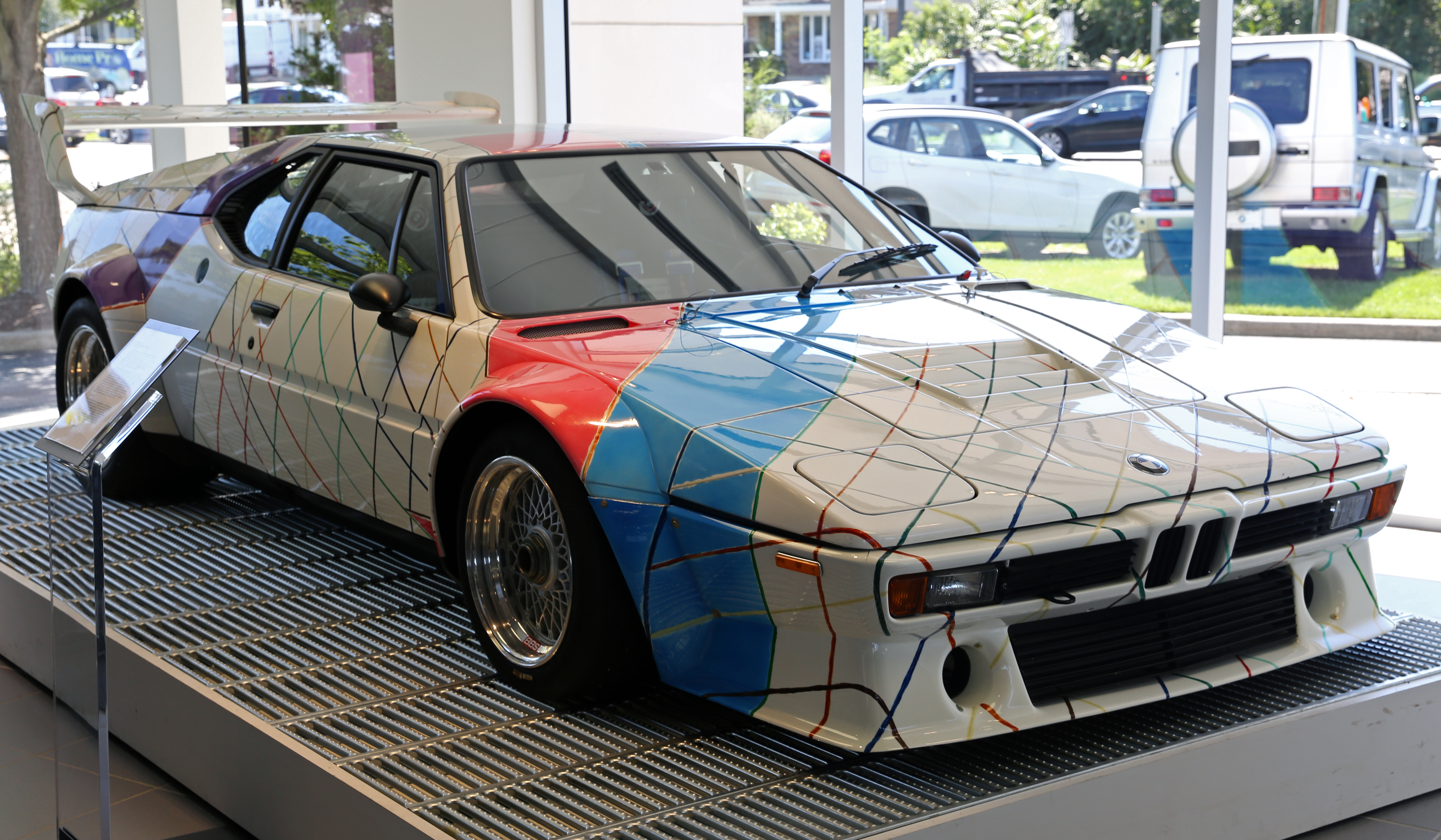
BMW M1 by Frank Stella (1979)

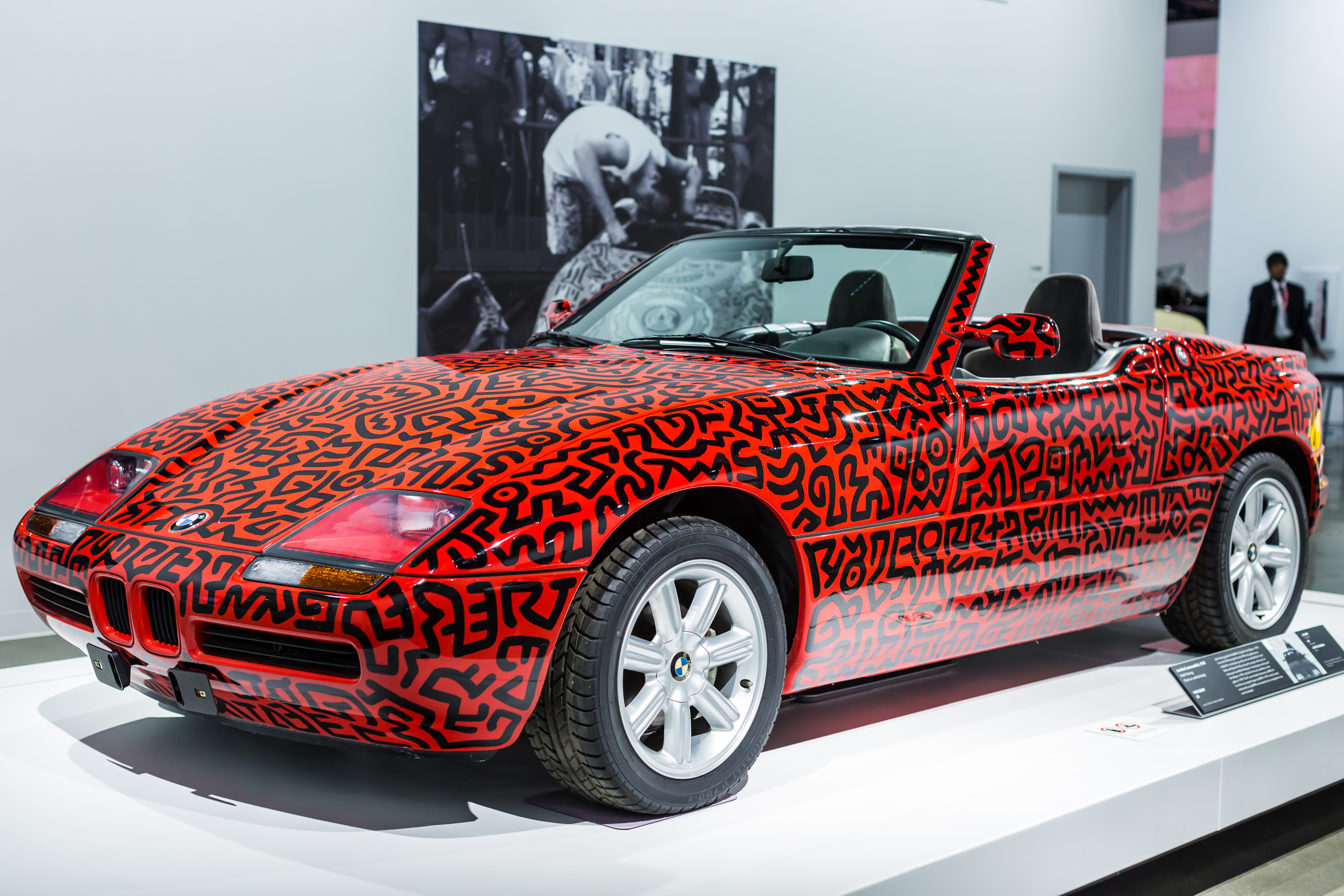
BMW Z1 by Keith Haring (1990)

== See also ==
- Art car
- PaykanArtCar, another car related art project
