= Museum of Contemporary Craft =

Museum in the United States

- Location within Portland, Oregon
- Established: 1937
- Dissolved: 28 February 2016
- Location: Portland, Oregon, United States
- Coordinates: 45.524444°N 122.677759°W
- Type: private: art

The Museum of Contemporary Craft (MoCC) (1937-2016) in Portland, Oregon was the oldest continuously-running craft institution on the west coast of the United States until its closure in 2016. The museum's mission was "to enliven and expand the understanding of craft and the museum experience." It was known as one of the few centers in the United States to focus on the relationships between art and craft, programming robust shows exploring a wide variety of artists, materials and techniques.

The organization was founded by Lydia Herrick Hodge in 1937 as the Oregon Ceramic Studio and led by her until 1960. The original art deco building was designed pro bono by Henry Abbott Lawrence for Lawrence, Holford, & Allyn, and built with assistance from the Works Progress Administration (WPA) and others.

Located at 3934 SW Corbett Avenue at its founding in 1937, the museum was relocated to 724 NW Davis Street, in downtown Portland's Pearl District, as of July 2007. The museum housed a permanent collection of over 1200 objects, all of them gifts, that documented the history of craft in the Pacific Northwest for over seven decades.

== History ==
=== Oregon Ceramic Studio ===
Lydia Herrick Hodge studied at the University of Oregon, as did ceramicist Victoria Avakian (later Ross). After graduating in 1927, Hodge went to Paris. After her return, Hodge founded the University Alumni Art League, which opened its first exhibition on April 1, 1935. In 1937, she founded the Oregon Ceramic Studio, which was later renamed the Museum of Contemporary Craft. The studio's building first opened in 1938. Other early organizers included Victoria Avakian and Katherine Macnab. Their intent was to augment the educational programs offered by local institutions, working with students and teachers and offering artists the use of their large kiln. They also sought to enable artists to show and sell their work.

MoCC's first location, 3934 SW Corbett Avenue, was home to the museum for 70 years. Land for the project was donated by the Portland Public School district on condition that it would serve local teachers and classes. Hodge was strongly supported by Ellis Lawrence, the first dean of the University of Oregon School of Architecture and Allied Arts. The art deco style building was designed pro bono by architect Henry Abbott Lawrence, working for his father's firm, Lawrence, Holford, & Allyn. Ellis Lawrence also raised funds for the project and convinced university vice-president Burt Brown Barker to apply for construction grants for it from the Works Progress Administration (WPA). For much of its life, the organization was run by volunteers, most of them women. Lydia Herrick Hodge was the studio director from 1937 until her death in 1960.

=== Contemporary Crafts Gallery ===
Artist-in-residence Ken Shores became the first paid director in 1964, changing the organization's name in 1965 from The Oregon Ceramic Studio to the Contemporary Crafts Gallery. He diversified its collections, and initiated an active project for Craftsmen in the Schools. By 1971, he was succeeded as director by interior designer Gordon Smyth. Smyth was interested in encouraging new artists, such as textile artist Bonnie Meltzer. Smyth was succeeded by Marlene Gabel in 1978. Gabel reached out to the glass-blowing community, holding annual glass exhibitions and group shows. In 1987 the organization celebrated its fiftieth anniversary, which was marked by the publication of 3934 Corbett: Fifty Years at Contemporary Crafts by Jane Van Cleeve.

The building underwent several renovations, most notably in 1998 when the Marlene Gabel Gallery was built, designed by Northwest Regional style architect William Fletcher. The Marlene Gabel Gallery served as the permanent collection space.

=== Museum of Contemporary Craft ===
In 2002, David Cohen became executive director and the Contemporary Crafts Gallery was renamed the Contemporary Crafts Museum & Gallery. Namita Gupta Wiggers became Curator in 2004, continuing in that position until 2012, then as Director and Chief Curator until 2014. In 2005, the museum board decided to move the museum's location, in response to concerns that it was hard for people to visit its location.

In 2007, the organization relocated to 724 NW Davis Street in the historic DeSoto Building on Portland's North Park Blocks, and was renamed the Museum of Contemporary Craft. As part of the grand opening at its new location, Portland artist Tom Cramer was commissioned to paint an unofficial BMW Art Car. The museum's collections were profiled in Unpacking the collection: selections from the Museum of Contemporary Craft (2008) marking a shift in emphasis on the organization as a museum, not just a space for the making or even the sale of craft works.

The new building was designed by Richard Brown Architects and provided the institution with nearly twice its previous space. Costs of transforming the organization were estimated at $6.5 million. Sale of the original Corbett Avenue site only resulted in $2 million. The new 15,000 square foot location increased foot traffic and visibility for the museum. It was the site of many exhibitions that featured local, national and international artists. However, it did not prove a successful relocation in terms of fundraising and ongoing financial support.

== Partnership with Pacific Northwest College of Art ==
In January 2009, MoCC integrated with the Pacific Northwest College of Art (PNCA), making the joint institution one of the largest organizations devoted to the visual arts in the state of Oregon. It was hoped that the merger would stabilize MoCC, which became known as the Museum of Contemporary Craft in partnership with Pacific Northwest College of Art.

PNCA announced in February 2016 that MoCC would close, with the collection being transferred to a new Center for Contemporary Art and Culture at PNCA.

== See also ==
- Culture of Portland, Oregon
