= House painter and decorator =

Tradesman who paints and decorates buildings

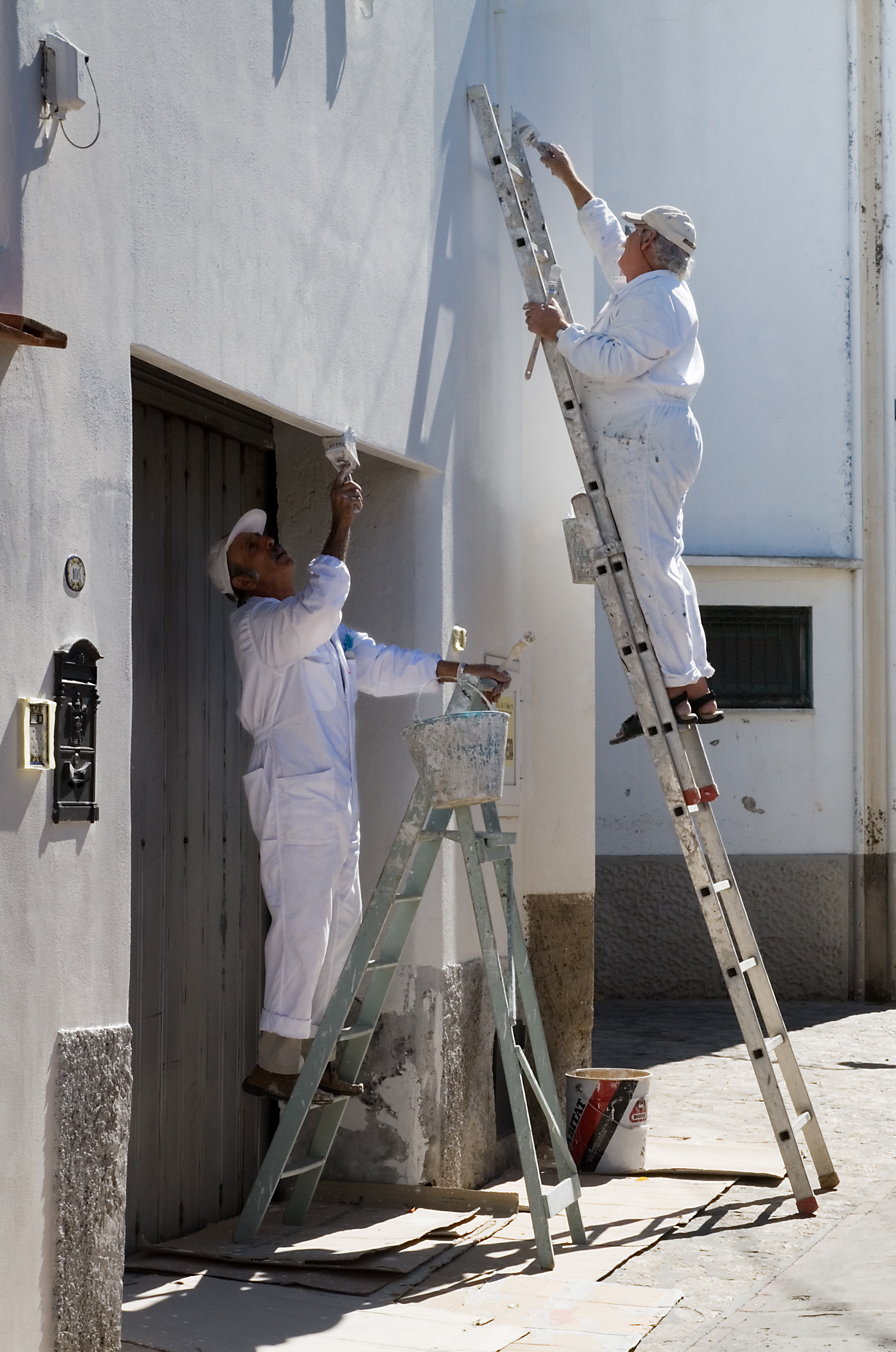
- House painters working in Capri, Italy

Occupation
- Occupation type: Vocational
- Activity sectors: Construction

Description
- Competencies: Patience, steady hand, physically strong
- Education required: Apprenticeship
- Fields of employment: Construction
- Related jobs: Plasterer

A house painter and decorator is a tradesperson responsible for the painting and decorating of buildings, and is also known as a decorator, or house painter. The purpose of painting is to improve the appearance of a building and to protect it from damage by water, corrosion, insects and mold. House painting can also be a form of artistic and/or cultural expression such as Ndebele house painting.

== History of the trade in England ==
In England, little is known of the trade and its structures before the late 13th century, at which point guilds began to form, amongst them the Painters Company and the Stainers Company. These two guilds eventually merged with the consent of the Lord Mayor of the City of London in 1502, forming the Worshipful Company of Painter-Stainers. The guild standardised the craft and acted as a protector of the trade secrets. In 1599, the guild asked Parliament for protection, which was eventually granted in a bill of 1606, which granted the trade protection from outside competition such as plasterers.

The Act legislated for a seven-year apprenticeship, and also barred plasterers from painting, unless apprenticed to a painter, with the penalty for such painting being a fine of £5. The Act also enshrined a maximum daily fee of 16 old pence for their labour.

Enforcement of this Act by the Painter-Stainers Company was sought up until the early 19th century, with master painters gathering irregularly to decide the fees that a journeyman could charge, and also instigating an early version of a job centre in 1769, advertising in the London newspapers a "house of call" system to advertise for journeymen and also for journeymen to advertise for work. The guild's power in setting the fee a journeyman could charge was eventually overturned by law in 1827, and the period after this saw the guild's power diminish, along with that of the other guilds; the guilds were superseded by trade unions, with the Operative United Painters' Union forming sometime around 1831.

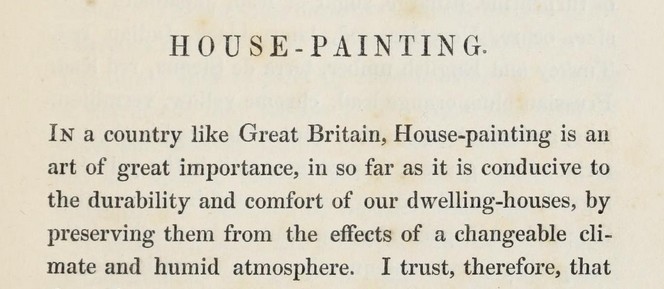

In 1894, a national association formed, recreating itself in 1918 as the National Federation of Master Painters and Decorators of England and Wales, then changing its name once again to the British Decorators Association before merging, in 2002, with the Painting & Decorating Federation to form the Painting & Decorating Association. The Construction Industry Joint Council, a body formed of both unions and business organizations, today has responsibility for the setting of pay levels.

== Activities of the trade ==
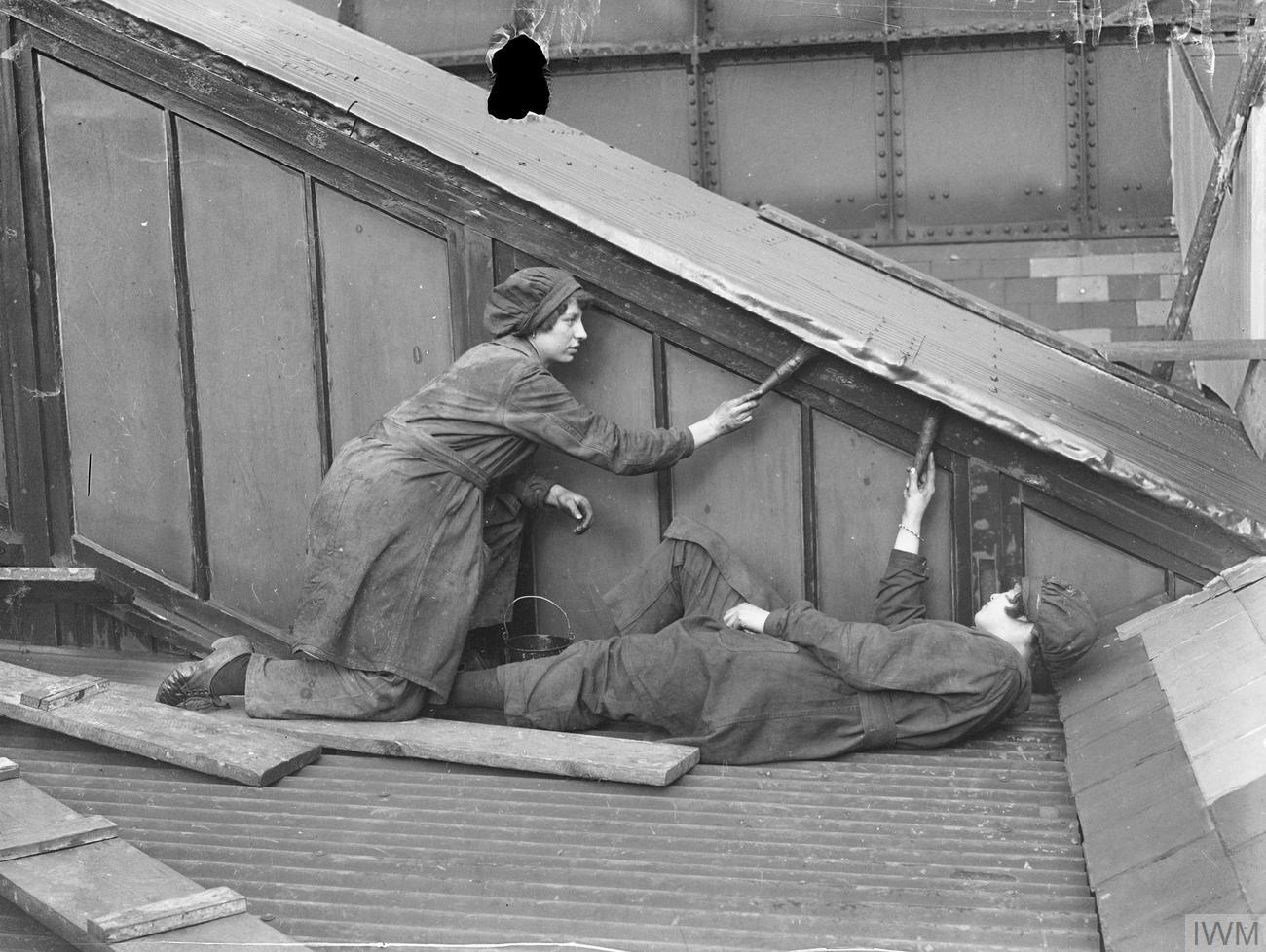
Two painters applying a coat of paint to the exterior of a train station

Historically, the painter was responsible for the mixing of the paint; keeping a ready supply of pigments, oils, thinners and driers. The painter would use their experience to determine a suitable mixture depending on the nature of the job. In modern times, the painter is primarily responsible for preparation of the surface to be painted, such as patching holes in drywall, using masking tape and other protection on surfaces not to be painted, applying the paint and then cleaning up.

Larger firms operating within the trade were generally capable of performing many painting or decoration services, from creating an accent wall to sign writing, to the gilding of objects or the finishing or refinishing of furniture.

Painter-work is described in the 1911 Encyclopædia Britannica Eleventh Edition where the relevant skills include preparing surfaces, mixing paint, gilding, distemper, and faux-finishes including marbleizing and graining.

More recently, professional painters are responsible for all preparation prior to painting. All stucco or popcorn or texture scraping, sanding, wallpaper removal, caulking, drywall or wood repair, patching, stain removal, filling nail holes or any defects with plaster or putty, cleaning, taping, preparation and priming are considered to be done by the professional contracted painter.

== Gallery ==
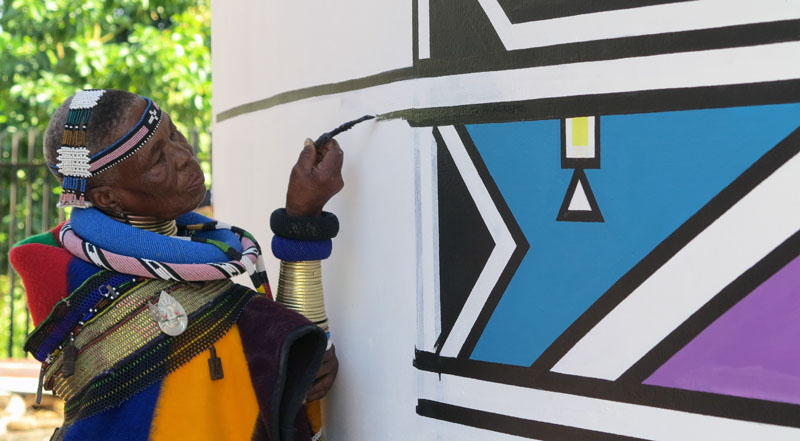
South African artist Esther Mahlangu painting in the distinctive Ndebele house painting style.

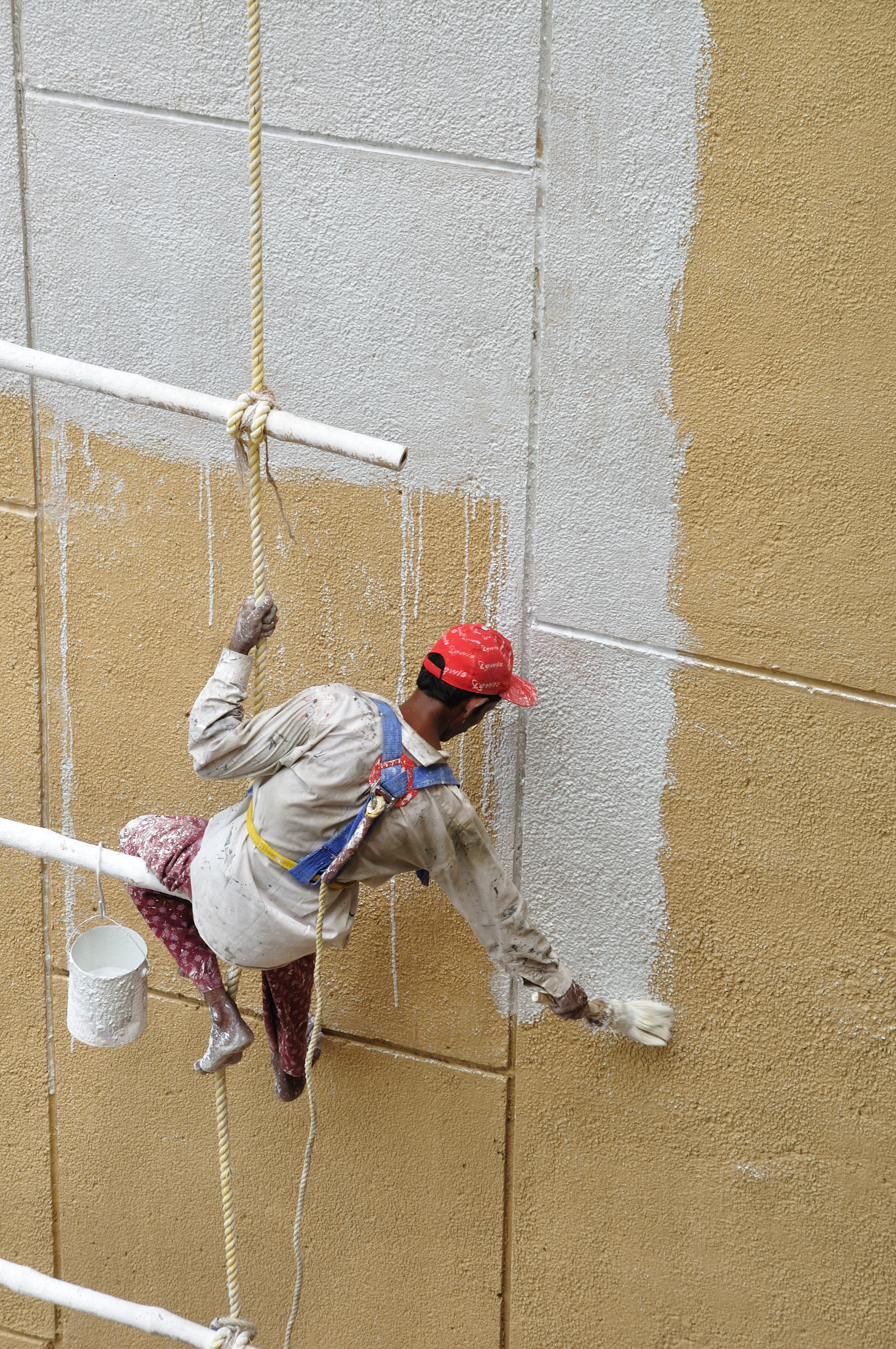
A painter working on an exterior wall in Kolkata, 2010

== See also ==
- Accent wall
- Adhesion testing
- Coating
- Environmental impact of paint
- List of painting tools and equipment
- Painting and Decorating Contractors of America
- Popcorn ceiling
- Volatile organic compounds
- Wallpaper
