= PDCA (disambiguation) =

PDCA is plan–do–check–act, or plan–do–check–adjust, an iterative four-step management method.

PDCA may also refer to:

- Painting and Decorating Contractors of America, former name of the Painting Contractors Association
- Muramoylpentapeptide carboxypeptidase, an enzyme
- Patiala District Carrom Association, affiliated to Punjab State Carrom Association, India
- Pyridinedicarboxylic acid, a group of organic compounds
