= Namita Gupta Wiggers =

American curator, educator, and writer

- Born: 1967 (age 58–59); Cincinnati, Ohio
- Known for: Craft, curator, artist, art history, educator
- Awards: Windgate Foundation, 2015; Award to Critical Craft Forum, Smithsonian Institution, 1992; Award for Museum Leadership

Namita Gupta Wiggers is a noted expert in the field of contemporary craft, museum curator, educator, and a writer based in Portland, Oregon. Her prior experiences as a studio jeweler, video ethnographer/design researcher, and museum educator shape her multidisciplinary thinking and consideration of craft in material, conceptual, and theoretical ways.

== Early life and education ==
She was born to Indian immigrants in Cincinnati, Ohio and received a BA in art history and English from Rice University in Houston, Texas in 1989. In 1994, she earned her MA in art history at the University of Chicago.

== Career ==
Namita began working as a Portland-based studio jeweler who sold some of her work to the Museum of Contemporary Craft (MoCC) in Portland. In 2004, she joined the MoCC as the head curator, and in 2012 she was promoted to head curator and director. In 2014, Namita stepped down from her position at MoCC.

She has lectured at The Pacific Northwest College of Art (PNCA) and taught an MFA of Applied Craft and Design at Oregon College of Art + Craft (OCAC).

Warren Wilson College appointed her director of MA in Critical and Craft Studies.

In 2008, Namita Gupta Wiggers cofounded Critical Craft Forum with Elisabeth Agro out of a desire for a place create a dialogue that spans the craft community. Namita is on the Board of Trustees to the American Craft Council and the Curatorial Board of AccessCeramics.

== Publications ==
Wiggers has contributed to multiple online and print articles and books. She serves as the exhibition reviews editor for The Journal of Modern Craft and on the editorial board for Garland Publishing. Her publications include Unpacking the Collection (2008), Ken Shores: Clay Has the Last Word (2010), and Generations: Betty Feves (2012).
