= Thomas Girst =

German author and cultural manager (born 1971)

Thomas Girst (born 4 July 1971, in Trier) is a German author and cultural manager.

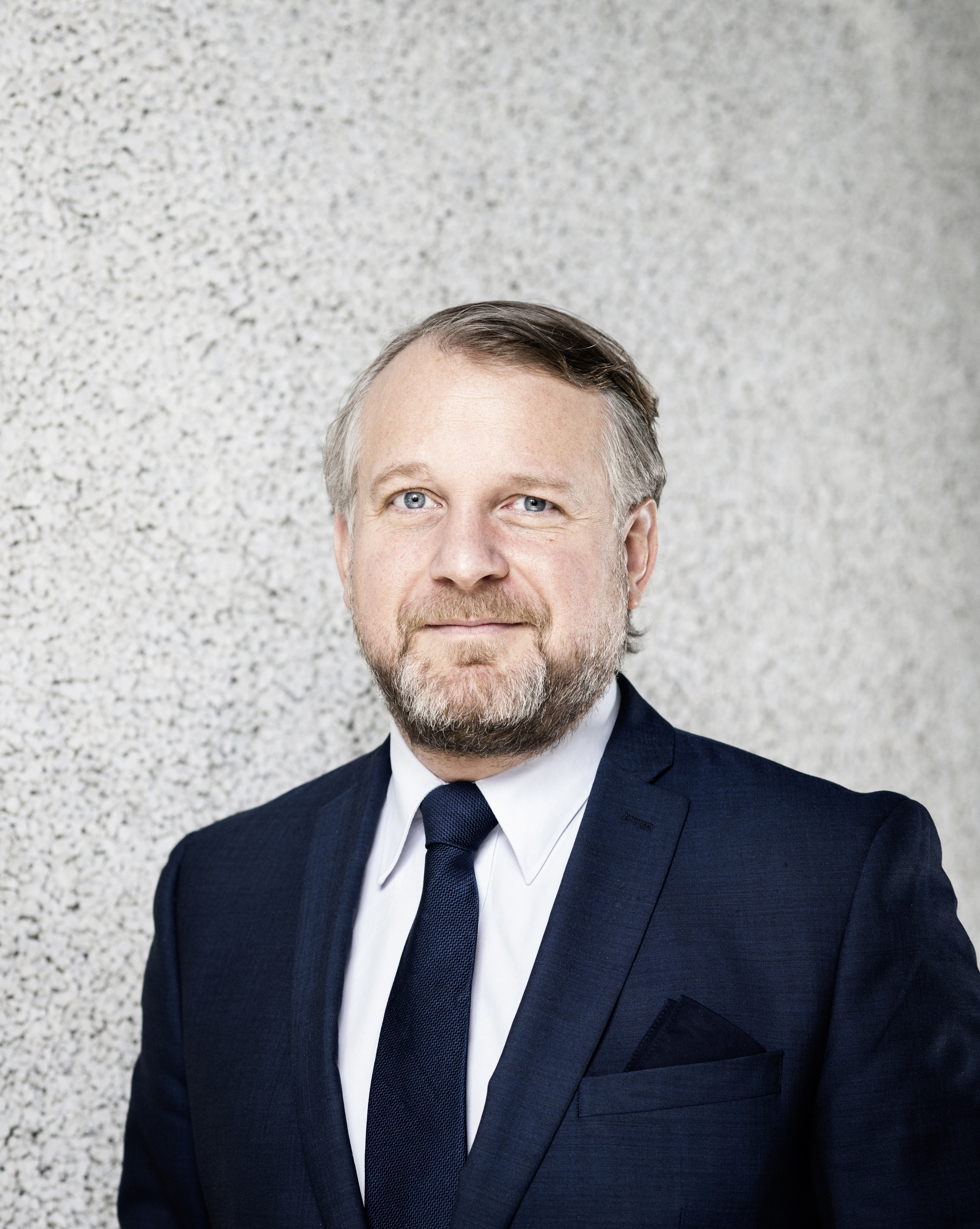

== Life ==
Girst graduated from Liverpool High School (New York State) and Rotenbuehl High School in Saarbruecken, Germany. He studied art history, American Studies and German Literature at Hamburg University and New York University. The subject of his PhD thesis was "Art, Literature, and the Japanese American Internment" during World War II. He lived in New York between 1995 and 2003, at first on a DAAD academic scholarship. After working at a gallery starting in 1998, in 2000 he became research manager of Toutfait.com, the first electronic resource for Marcel Duchamp studies under the Art Science Research Laboratory's publishing arm. During that time he also was the cultural correspondent for the German daily “Die Tageszeitung.” Since 2003 he is the Head of Cultural Engagement at the BMW Group, Munich, overseeing hundreds of long-term partnerships worldwide ranging from opera houses to orchestras, museums to art fairs, as well as initiatives in the fields of modern and contemporary art, film, design, architecture, classical music and jazz. [2] He has worked and collaborated extensively with artists over many years, among them Esther Mahlangu, Jeff Koons, Ólafur Elíasson, Julie Mehretu, Cao Fei, John Baldessari and Juan Manuel Echavarría.

In 2016, he was honored with the "European Cultural Manager of the Year" award.

Girst was the founding editor and publisher (together with the poet Jan Wagner) of "Die Aussenseite des Elementes" (1992–2003), an international anthology of prose, poetry, illustration and art. As a curator, he organized numerous exhibitions, including “Alive and Kicking: the Collages of Charles Henri Ford" at the Scene Gallery in New York as well as "Marcel Duchamp in Munich 1912" at the Lenbachhaus in Munich. Girst teaches at LMU Munich, at the Academy of Fine Arts, Munich, as well as at the Academy of Applied Sciences in Zurich. Between 2005 and 2009, he was a member of the Board for Arts Sponsorship within the Association of Arts and Culture of the German Economy at the Federation of German Industries, and since 2010, he sits on their panel for literature. He is a member of the Board of Spielmotor e.V. as well as for the Association of the Architecture Museum, Munich. Since 2012, Girst is cultural representative for the Nymphenburg Porcelain Manufactory. Since 2015, he is a member of the Council of the University of Music and Performing Arts in Munich and a member of the board of trustees of the Friends of Haus der Kunst, Munich. In 2016 he was appointed member of the advisory board for Sky Arts. In 2017, he joined The Indian Biennale Effects and Ecosystems Advisory Board and in 2018 the advisory panel of the Museum of Art and Photography in Bangalore. In 2019, Girst was appointed ambassador of the Saarland by the state's chief minister.

Since 2023, he is a member of the Board of Trustees at the Center for Culture and Arts of the Technical University of Munich, and since 2025 he serves on the advisory board of the Bergson Kunstkraftwerk.

== Teaching ==
Girst is honorary professor at the Academy of Fine Arts, Munich as well as adjunct professor at the IE Business School in Madrid. He also teaches as a lecturer at LMU Munich's Faculty of History and the Arts. Aside from international guest lectures he also is a lecturer at the Zurich University of Applied Sciences (ZHAW) and at the IED Instituto Europe di Design in Venice.

== Publications (selection) ==
Besides his work as a cultural correspondent for Die Tageszeitung between 2000 and 2003,[9] Girst has published widely online and in print within international newspapers, magazines, catalogues and academic journals, including Amerasia Journal, Tate Modern, The Nordic Journal of Aesthetics, Science Ltd., Staatsgalerie Stuttgart, Museo Jumex, Serpentine Galleries, Cooper Hewitt Smithsonian Museum of Design, Kunsthalle Schirn, ICA, ZKM Karlsruhe, The Andy Warhol Foundation, Museum for Applied Arts Cologne, Staatliches Museum Schwerin, Art in America, Frieze, Sotheby's, The Art Newspaper, Frankfurter Allgemeine Zeitung, Art, NYArts, Financial Times, Frankfurter Rundschau, SZ-Magazin, Welt, Wirtschaftswoche, Artnet, Weltkunst, Wallpaper, Forbes, Bloomberg, Vogue, The Brooklyn Rail.

=== Author ===
- Aftershock: The Readymade in Postwar and Contemporary American Art, New York: Dickinson, 2003 (with Francis M. Naumann) ISBN 978-1885013354
- Martin Eder: Die kalte Kraft, Berlin: Hatje Cantz, 2004, ISBN 978-3-7757-1474-7 (German, English)
- The Indefinite Duchamp, Berlin: Hatje Cantz, 2013, ISBN 978-3-7757-3414-1 (German, English)
- The Duchamp Dictionary, London and New York: Thames and Hudson, 2014, ISBN 9780500239179 (English, Korean, Chinese)
- Art, Literature, and the Japanese American Internment, Frankfurt & New York: Peter Lang, 2015, ISBN 978-3631659373
- 100 Secrets of the Art World, London: Koenig, 2016 (with Magnus Resch), ISBN 978-3863359614
- Alle Zeit der Welt, München: Hanser, 2019 ISBN 978-3446261877 (German, Italian, Korean)
- Esther Mahlangu: To Paint is in my Heart, London and New York: Thames and Hudson, 2024 ISBN 978-0500028124 (with Azu Nwagbogu, Hans Ulrich Obrist)

=== Editor ===
- Die Außenseite des Elementes Nr. 1-11, Berlin and New York: non profit Art Movement (NPAM), 1992–2003
- Editor-in-chief, Tout-Fait: The Marcel Duchamp Studies Online Journal Nr. 1–5, New York: Art Science Research Laboratory, 1999–2003
- Marcel Duchamp in Munich 1912, Munich: Schirmer/Mosel, 2012 ISBN 9783829605915 (German, English) (with Helmut Friedl, Matthias Mühling, Felicia Rappe)
- BMW Art Cars, Berlin: Hatje Cantz, 2014 (revised edition 2025) ISBN 978-3-7757-3344-1 (German, English, French)
