= Accent wall =

Wall in a room whose design differs from the other walls

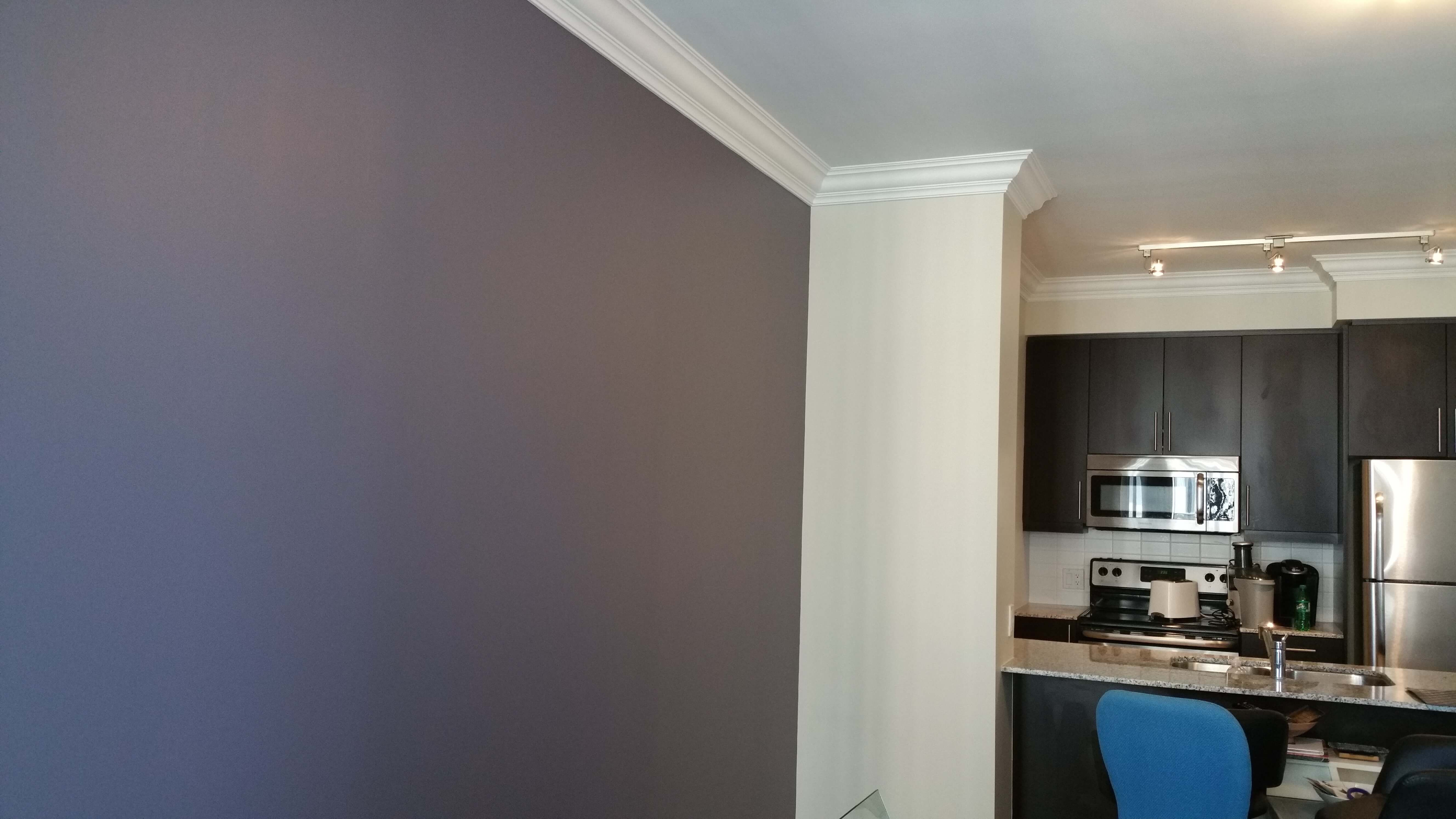
A dark purple accent wall

An accent wall or feature wall is an interior wall whose design differs from that of the other walls in the room. The accent wall's color can simply be a different shade of the color of the other walls, or have a different design in terms of the color and material. Accent wall offers a simple, stylish way to add colours to a room.

Accent walls are typically intended to break up the pattern created by the other walls, especially when the walls are painted a single flat tone. However, a room may be wallpapered and have an accent wall that is untextured and undecorated, serving the same purpose. The point of this can be for aesthetics alone or to highlight or frame some decorative element, such as a painting.

== See also ==
- House painter and decorator
