= Dads' Gates =

- U.S. National Register of Historic Places
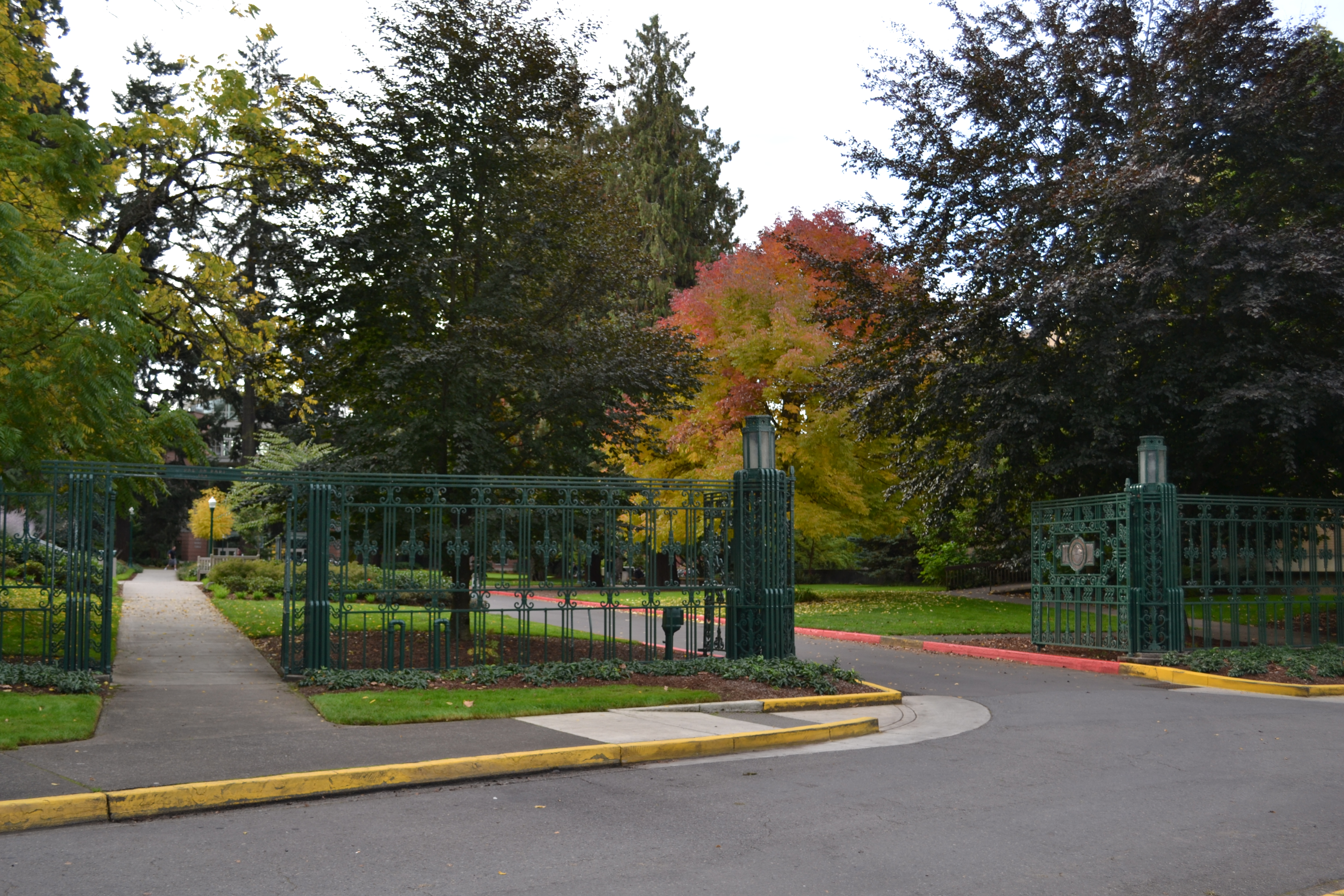
- The gates in 2011

- Location within Oregon Location within the United States
- Location: 11th Ave. E. bet. Kincaid St. and Franklin Blvd., Eugene, Oregon
- Coordinates: 44°02′51″N 123°04′39″W
- Area: less than one acre
- Built: 1938
- Architect: Dawson, O.B.; et al.
- NRHP reference No.: 04000829
- Added to NRHP: August 11, 2004

Dads' Gates, located on the University of Oregon campus in Eugene, Oregon, are listed in the National Register of Historic Places.

== Background ==
Oregon's Dads' Gates are large wrought iron gates that are located on 11th Ave. E. between Kincaid St. and Franklin Blvd. in Eugene, Oregon at the entrance to the University of Oregon campus. At their beginning, Dads' Gates were supposed to offer one of the most spectacular entrances to a campus found anywhere in the country. The construction of Dads' Gates began in 1938 as an art project funded by the Works Progress Administration in order to help create work for skilled craftsmen due to the recent Depression. Dads' Gates historical and current functions can be described as a "work of art" and as a "landscape object."

The Gates are decorated with a commemorative plaque that helps identify its significance to those curious enough to investigate them. The plaque reads, "These gates and enclosures are dedicated to the memory of the forty-seven University of Oregon men who died in the service of their country in 1917-1918" showing their dedication towards the University's former soldiers. Dads' Gates were created with a collaborative effort from Henry Abbott Lawrence and Orion Benjamin Dawson.

== Description ==
Dad's Gates are 8 feet tall and 120 feet long with each door being 10 feet wide allowing for a 20-foot entry. Both doors are mirror images of each other and each contain the bronze University seal. They have a very intricate design to them that combine both linear and curvilinear elements. Design elements such as a scroll, cross, flower, lyre, and spear motifs can be seen throughout the wrought iron. Above each gate is written "Oregon Dads 1940" and on top of each pylon there are large glass lanterns similar to those outside of Knight Library on the University of Oregon campus. However, when Dad's Gates were originally dedicated in 1941 the lanterns were not in place. It is unclear as to when they were installed but photos indicate somewhere after 1946 and before the University Theater was built in 1949.

== Background on Orion Benjamin Dawson ==
Orion Benjamin Dawson produced Dads' Gates with design help from Henry Abbott Lawrence. Dawson learned the blacksmithing trade through an apprenticeship in high school and while in World War I he was in charge of shoeing horses. It was in France where he met another blacksmith that showed him how to make gates and decorative elements out of wrought iron. Many believe that Dads' Gates were a collaborative effort between Dawson and Abbot more than anything. Dawson wrote in his unpublished autobiography that he felt the design was beautiful and unlike anything he had ever see. He stated, "[T]hey are somewhat modern and yet designed in such a way that every part had to go through the fire and be forged…[w]hen I saw Abbott's design I knew we had something, something that could make these gates the most beautiful campus entrance to be found anywhere in the country."

During the Depression, Dawson acquired work through the Works Progress Administration for various art projects. His first project was designing and producing the wrought iron gates inside of the new University of Oregon Library. He then received commissions to work at the Oregon State University campus as well as being assigned the task of producing all of the wrought iron work at Timberline Lodge. He also produced the Howe Memorial Gates for the University of Oregon, which have a striking resemblance to the ones he produced for Dads' Gates.

== Dedication of Dads' Gates ==
O. B. Dawson began production on Dad's Gates in 1938 and they were funded by the Works Progress Administration. Burt Brown Barker, who at the time was unpaid President of the University and also an Oregon dad, heavily funded the gates. Barker was head of the WPA Department of Art in Oregon and he was approached by Ellis Lawrence to build the gate and was told that the federal government would pay for the cost of labor while the Dads were to take care of material costs and expenditures incurred while shipping and installing the gate.

While initial costs were estimated to be around $1,500 with Barker paying $500 and the Dads raising $1,000, however, costs continued to rise and in the end Barker poured in over $1,600 of his personal funds along with the Dads bringing the total cost to about $5,000. Including the WPA grant, the total cost of Dads' Gates came to be $25,000. Donors were promised by Barker that, "[W]hen you look through the Dad's Gate along the mall to the library building, you will have an unobstructed and inspiring vista, the like of which may not be found on any other western campus."

One of the reasons for Dads' Gates being produced was that "the working of iron for ornamental uses was rapidly becoming a lost art until the federal government revived it as a means of providing work for skilled craftsmen during the recent depression." The dedication of Dads' Gates came on February 8, 1941 during Dad's Weekend. President Donald M. Erb and Joseph F. Reisch presented them with the slogan "The Gates are Open Dad." However, Barker was quoted saying that "[B]y the time the ceremonies were concluded the marching through the open gates was that of a rain soaked crowd seeking shelter. Because of the heavy rain very few of those present took time to study the gates carefully so as to appreciate their beauty."

== Historical significance ==
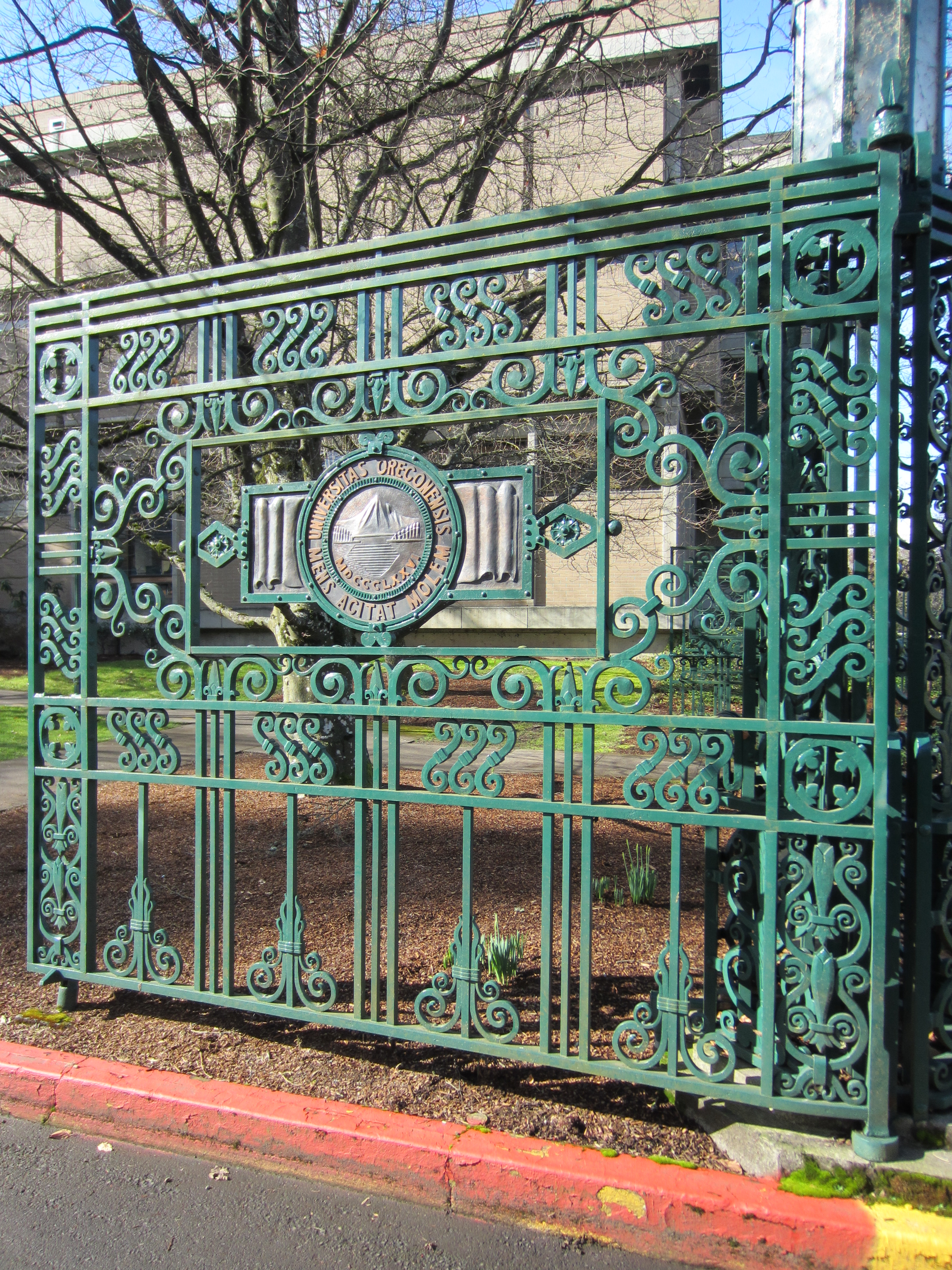
Part of the gates in 2013

In the National Register of Historic Places Registration Form it states that certain criteria must be met for something to be qualified as a "historic place." One of the criteria that must be met is that, "[P]roperty is associated with events that have made a significant contribution to the broad patterns of our history" and Dads' Gates easily qualify for this criterion. Dads' Gates are significant to Oregon's history because they are associated with the Great Depression and the Works Progress Administration which are both events that have made significant contributions to the broad patterns of the history of Oregon and University of Oregon.

Another criterion that must be met under the Historic Places guidelines is, "Property embodies the distinctive characteristics of a type, period, or method of construction or represents the work of a master, or possesses high artistic values, or represents a significant and distinguishable entity whose components lack individual distinction."

Dads' Gates are an example of the old wrought iron methods of construction used during this era and they fall into both the "art" and "landscape architecture" areas of significance.

The Gates are also of local significance because of the small number of Works Progress Administration art projects that were actually completed in Eugene and because they are so intrinsically linked with the famous Oregon architect Ellis Lawrence and the University of Oregon.
