= Burt Brown Barker =

Oregon historian, administrator (1873–1969)

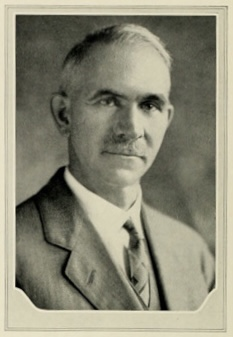
- Burt Brown Barker c. 1928
- Born: November 3, 1873
- Died: January 29, 1969 (aged 95)

Burt Brown Barker (November 3, 1873 – January 29, 1969) was a lawyer, arts advocate, university administrator, federal program administrator, regional historian and preservationist. Over the course of his long life he extensively researched the people and places of his home state and was described as the "grand old man of Oregon history."

Born in Waitsburg, Washington, and raised in Salem in northwestern Oregon, Barker was a school friend of future U.S. president Herbert Hoover. Educated at Willamette University, University of Chicago, and Harvard Law School, Barker worked as a lawyer in Chicago and New York before he joined University of Oregon in 1928 as vice president and acting president. He was heavily involved in organizing and funding the creation of the campus' Dads' Gates. Barker commissioned or purchased the campus statue Pioneer Mother from artist Alexander Phimister Proctor. Pioneer Mother was either dedicated to or modeled after Barker's mother, Elvira Brown Matheny, who came to the Oregon Country by wagon train when she was three years old.

Barker served as the director of Region 16 for the Public Works of Art Project from 1933 to 1934, and director of the Federal Art Project office based in Portland. He was also a president of the Oregon Historical Society. Barker is noted as being the first person to obtain access to the records of the Hudson's Bay Company in London, which had previously been closed to researchers.

As a preservationist he was involved in conserving the Hoover–Minthorn House in Newberg (Hoover's childhood home), the Lee Parsonage and Jason Lee House at what is now the Willamette Heritage Center, and the Ox Barn at the Aurora Museum.

Barker retired from practice in 1938, died in 1969 at age 95, and was buried in the Riverview Cemetery Mausoleum. He was survived by his daughter Mrs. John Sprouse of Portland and sister Mrs. Blanche Walker of Tacoma.
