= Ndebele house painting =

African art style

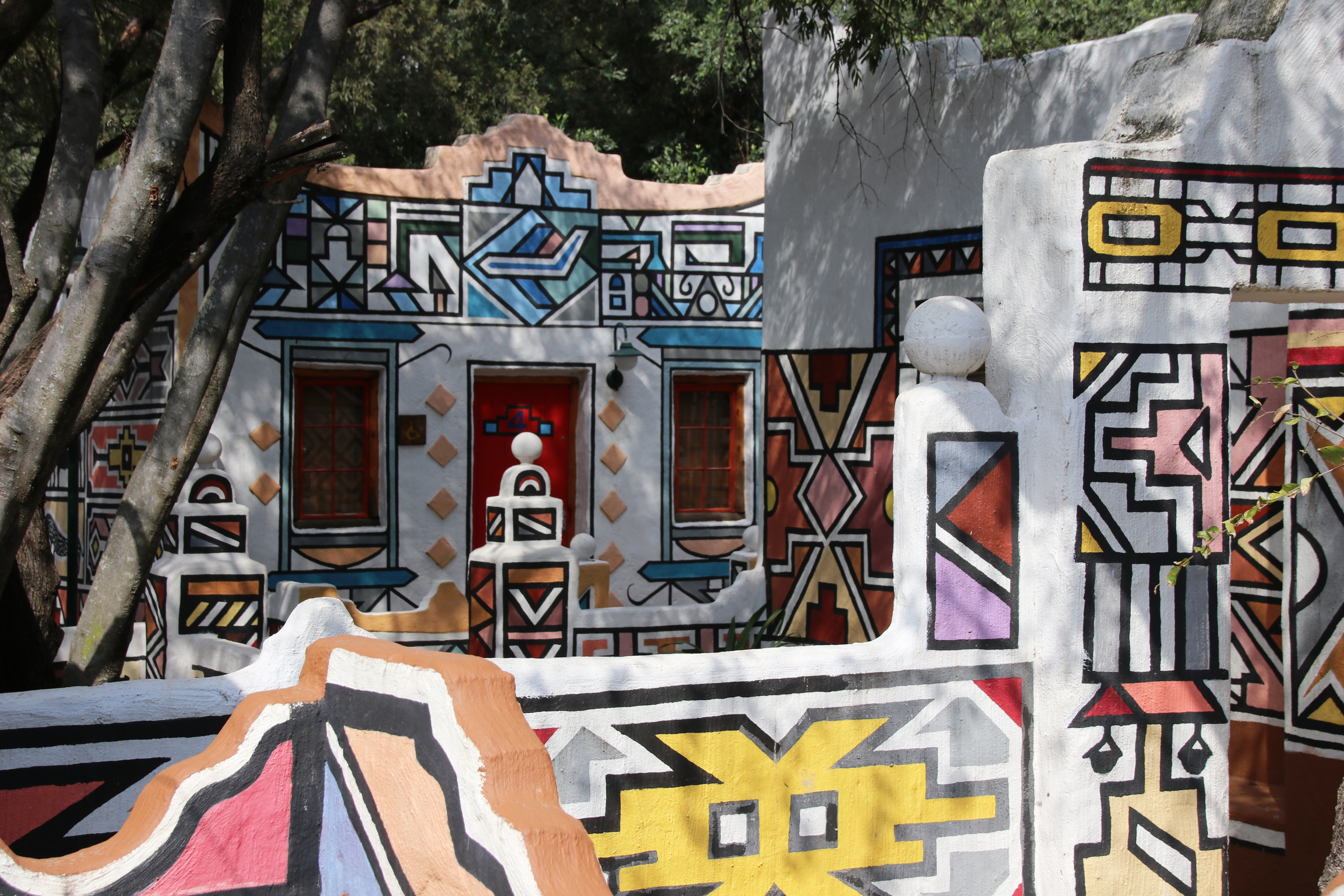
Ndebele house painting is noted for its use of geometric patterns and bright color combinations.

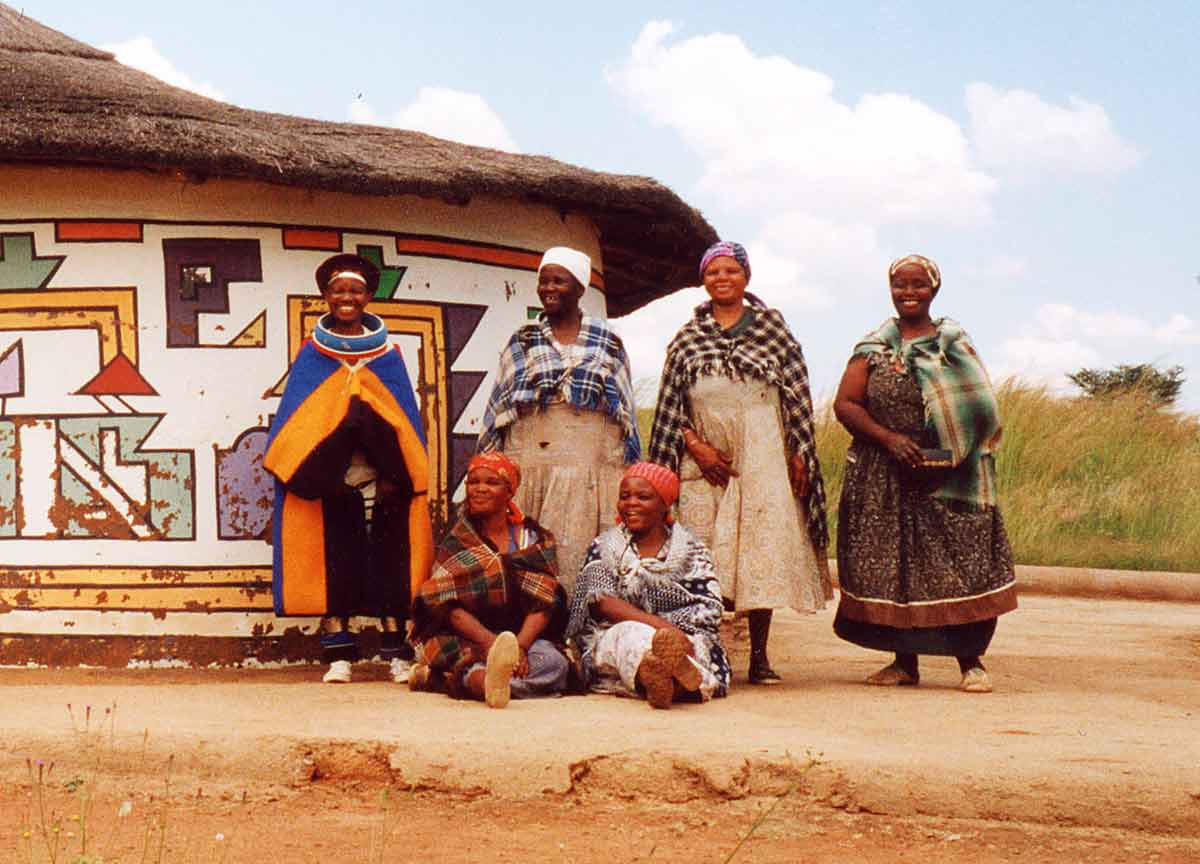
Ndebele women standing in front of a painted rondavel.

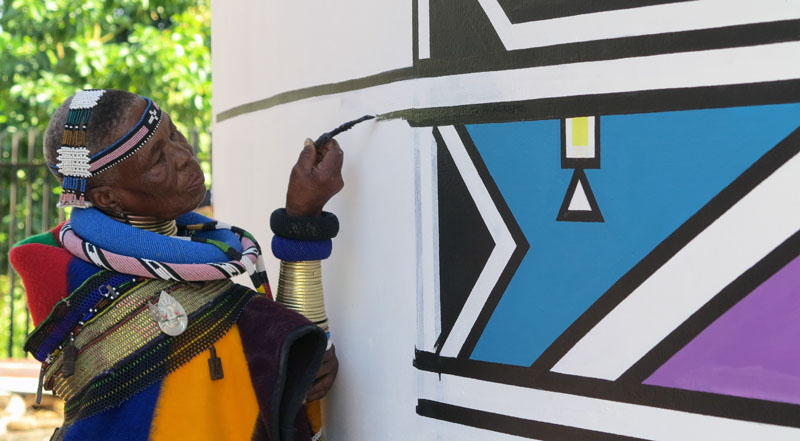
The Ndebele artist Esther Mahlangu painting on a wall.

Ndebele house painting is a form of African art practiced by the Southern Ndebele people of South Africa and the Northern Ndebele people in Matobo, Zimbabwe. It is practiced predominantly by Ndebele women.

== History ==
The art found in the traditional homestead of the Ndebele people dates back to a thousand years and is evidenced by the rock art found in the Matopos attributed to the Khoi-San. In 2016 the US Ambassador's' fund for Cultural preservation (AFCP) awarded a grant to document the Ndebele traditional art form of hut painting and decoration. This comes as it is important to pass on the skills and knowledge from one generation to the other.

During the 18th century, the Ndzundza Ndebele people of South Africa created their tradition and style of house painting. Until the late 1900s, the Ndebele noted warriors and large landowners. In the autumn of 1883, they went to war with the neighboring Boers. The loss of the war brought on a harsh life and horrible punishments for the Ndebele. Through those hard times, expressive symbols were generated by the suffering people expressing their grief. These symbols were the beginning of the African art form.

The Ndebele tribe originally in the early 18th century lived in grass huts. They began using mud-walled houses in the mid-18th century when these symbols begin to be created on their houses and walls. These expressive symbols were used for communication between sub-groups of the Ndebele people. They stood for their continuity and cultural resistance to their circumstances. The Boer farmers did not understand the meaning and viewed it as cultural art that was not harmful, so it was allowed to continue. These wall paintings done by the women were their secret code to their people, disguised to anyone but the Ndebele.

The vibrant symbols and expressions portray communications of personal prayers, self-identification, values, emotions, and marriage. Sometimes the male initiation, known as UkuWela (The Crossing), was a reason for repainting, but the ritual was not expressed. One quality of life that has never been expressed or directed through their walls is sacred expression. The rituals and religions have never been a part of the Ndebele's house paintings. The women of the Ndebele are often the traditional carriers and the main developer of the wall art of their home. The tradition and style of house painting are passed down in the families from generation to generation by the mothers. A well-painted home shows the female of the household as a good wife and mother. She is responsible for the painting of the outside gates, front walls, side walls, and usually the interior of her home. One thing that has changed since the beginning of house painting and present-day wall art is their styles.

At the beginning of house painting, their symbols and patterns were often based on Ndebele's beadwork. The patterns were tonal and painted with the women's fingers. The original paint on the house was a limestone whitewash. The colors added to make the paintings were mostly natural pigments consisting of browns, blacks, and others. Most of the patterns were of a V shape and a very simple triangle on a large shape color. The patterns, earth tones, directions, and sizes were more important than the present-day vivid and bright colors.

== Colors ==
Over time, the colors and shape became a key aspect of the overall design. In the late 1968s, the new style was evident. What was once a finger-painted creation was now created using bundled twigs with feathers as brushes. The walls are still originally whitewashed, but the outlines and colors have significantly changed. The patterns and symbols can be seen today with a rich black outline and a vivid color inside. There are five main colors represented: red and dark red, yellow to gold, sky blue, green, and sometimes pink. The colors give an intensified symbolic meaning to the Ndebele. They can mean the status or power of the home's owners, offer prayer, announce a marriage in the home, or can represent a current protest. The paintings express an abstract meaning with no real. This is the most direct way to show their expression to the people outside their far distinct family, showing the talent and the taste of the mother. The color white is always used as the background because it makes the bright patterns stand out more.

== Patterns ==
The pink patterns are one of the most important aspects of their communication through painting. They are usually repeated throughout their design with only a very slight variation and different color choices. The geometric patterns and shapes are first drawn with the black outline and later filled in with color. The patterns are grouped throughout the walls in terms of their basic design structure. Creating the right tools to allow accuracy and freedom become a difficult task. The tools can't restrict the painter from creating her art. They have to have tools for the large geometric shapes of flat color and small brushes for the very small areas, outlines, and sacks. The advancement of tools has allowed faster and more complex designs throughout the Ndebele's homes.

These very simple-looking painted houses are a complex system of tradition and creation. This painted tradition is still alive today. As every generation passes it down little changes begin to exist. This is their way of communication and expression through their home. The women work long and hard to finish these walls and are noticed by the outside community because of their talent and expression.

== See also ==
- Esther Mahlangu
