= Painting and Decorating Contractors of America =

American painting and decorating non-profit association

The Painting Contractors Association (PCA) is a non-profit association established in 1884 to represent the painting and decorating industry. It was founded as the Master House Painters Association of the United States and Canada, and became the Painting and Decorating Contractors of America (PDCA). PCA has established industry standards, issues publications, and has a contractor accreditation program through their 'Contractor College' website. Members of PCA can be found throughout the United States, Canada and other countries. They are served regionally and locally by more than 100 volunteer based Councils, Chapters and Forums.

== Scholarships ==
The A. E. Robert Friedman/PDCA Scholarship Fund of PDCA was formed in 1978, to honor Bob Friedman on the occasion of his fortieth anniversary as legal counsel for the PDCA. Since 1978, over 158 scholarships have been given to students between the ages of 18 and 24 of any background and career choice that have been nominated by an active member of PDCA. It is intended to show the commitment of PDCA members to supporting the educational efforts of young people in search of promising careers. In 2013, seven scholarships of $3,000 per recipient were awarded, up from five scholarships the previous year.

== Annual convention ==
The association hosts an annual convention, the "Painting Contractors EXPO", which presents new developments in the painting industry. During the event, PCA presents awards to members of the industry.

== Education ==
PDCA offers online education and an accreditation program at Contractor College. Publications created by PDCA have been recognized by other professional organizations for training purposes and reference.

== Industry leadership ==
PCA has connected with a variety of groups to provide services to the painting and decorating profession. Some examples of these initiatives have focused on improving occupational safety and health, and the role of women in painting
