= Tom Cramer =

American artist

- Born: February 9, 1960 (age 66); Portland, Oregon, U.S.
- Education: Pacific Northwest College of Art Pratt Institute
- Known for: Painting

Tom Cramer (born 9 February, 1960) is an American artist working in Portland, Oregon noted for his intricately carved and painted wood reliefs and ubiquity throughout the city of Portland. Often called the unofficial Artist Laureate of Portland, Cramer is one of the most visible and successful artists in the city. The influences on his work are both organic and technological.

He is widely collected and is in many prominent West Coast museums and private collections. He is in the permanent collections of the Portland Art Museum in Portland, Oregon; the Halle Ford Museum in Salem, Oregon; the Jordan Schnitzer Museum in Eugene, Oregon, the Boise Art Museum in Idaho.

== Biography ==
Cramer made a name for himself in the 1980s and 1990s, becoming a bridge between historical Oregon artists like Clifford Gleason and Milton Wilson and the international influx of new artists to the city since the mid-1990s. Tom Cramer grew up in Portland, Oregon in a musical family and played French horn in the Portland Youth Philharmonic in the late 1970s. He started drawing in 1973 during this period and gradually became more interested in visual art. His first serious art classes in high school were followed by later instruction at the Museum Art School (later called the Pacific NW College of Art) in Portland, Oregon as well as Pratt Institute in New York. Cramer went to the same high school as Gus Van Sant and appeared briefly in his feature film My Own Private Idaho. A Cramer painted VW Van appeared in Van Sant’s Even Cowgirls Get the Blues.

While in New York, Cramer encountered the likes of many artists, including Keith Haring, Jean-Michel Basquiat, Mike Bidlo, Kent Floeter. The Primitive/Modern show and High/Low shows had special influence, as did the burgeoning East Village art scene.

The 1977 BMW 320i art car, painted by Tom Cramer in 1987, pictured in front of a mural.

Cramer returned to Portland, Oregon, in the mid-1980s and quickly became well known via many shows at the Folkcraft Gallery and later the Jamison Thomas Gallery. There he expanded his show base to Los Angeles and San Francisco - as well as the Jamison Thomas Gallery in New York. He later had one-person shows at the Blue Gallery, the Butters Gallery, the Pulliam Gallery, and the Mark Woolley Gallery. From 2006 to 2013, he was with the Laura Russo Gallery.

Currently he is represented by The Augen Gallery in Portland and the Imogen Gallery in Astoria. A show of carved wood reliefs and drawings for the Jordan Schnitzer Museum of Art took place in Fall 2019. Tom Cramer has always been heavily influenced by classical as well as modern popular music. He has cited an improvisational approach to his creative process that is not unlike a musical approach. Key musical influences include Bach, Beethoven, Bruckner, Klaus Schulze, Future Sound of London and Miles Davis. He became well known in the 1980s and 1990s for his painted cars as well as large-scale colorful murals.

He later designed costumes and sets for James Canfield's, "Jungle" with a soundtrack by the Future Sound of London. In the 1980s, he began his painted and carved wood reliefs, which became his most noteworthy works. He also does carved/painted furniture and objects, as well as continues his work in drawing and oil painting. His best-known mural, "Machine", from 1989, was demolished in 2017. However, he has recently been doing a series of new murals around Portland, Oregon. Several recent trips to India, Egypt and Europe have expanded his base of influences.

Tom Cramer continues to work in a variety of media, including drawing, painted relief carving, murals and oil on canvas paintings.

== The Machine ==
Cramer's best-known mural, “Machine” was painted in 1989. In February 2016, the building on which "Machine" was painted changed ownership, and “Machine” became endangered. This sparked a community response to save the mural at a time when new developments were threatening sites throughout a city noted for its artistic personality. "Machine" was demolished in 2017 and a new mural by Cramer now resides on the new building in its place, a bridge between so called "Old Portland" and "New Portland".
