= Esther Mahlangu =

South African artist (born 1935)

Esther Nikwambi Mahlangu OIS
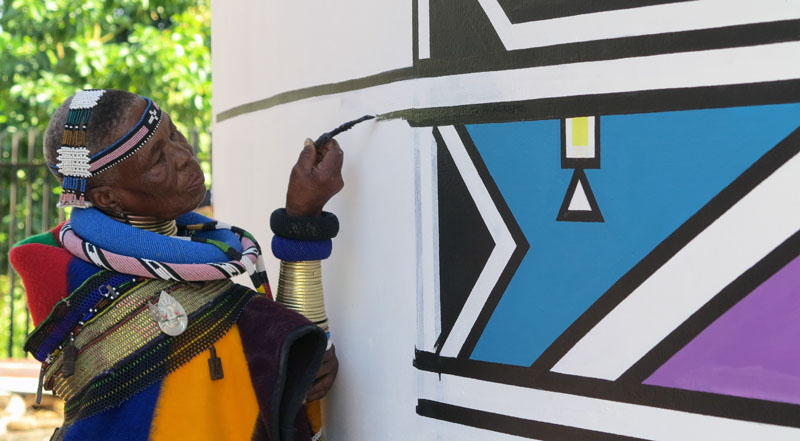
- Mahlangu painting on a wall.
- Born: 11 November 1935 (age 90); Middelburg, Mpumalanga, South Africa
- Style: Ndebele house painting
- Website: esthermahlanguart.com

Esther Nikwambi Mahlangu OIS (born 11 November 1935) is a South African artist known for her bold, large-scale paintings inspired by her Ndebele heritage. Raised on a farm in the Mpumalanga region, she began painting as a child but did not receive critical recognition until the late 1980s. She is one of the most prominent contemporary practitioners of Ndebele house painting and has brought international attention to the art form by adapting its style to alternative materials such as canvas, metal, and clothing.

Her work has been exhibited internationally and has appeared in collaborations with global brands including BMW and Rolls-Royce. In addition to her artistic work, Mahlangu has been involved in teaching and cultural preservation, and opened an art school in her hometown to pass on traditional Ndebele painting techniques to younger generations. She is one of South Africa's most well-known artists.

== Early life ==
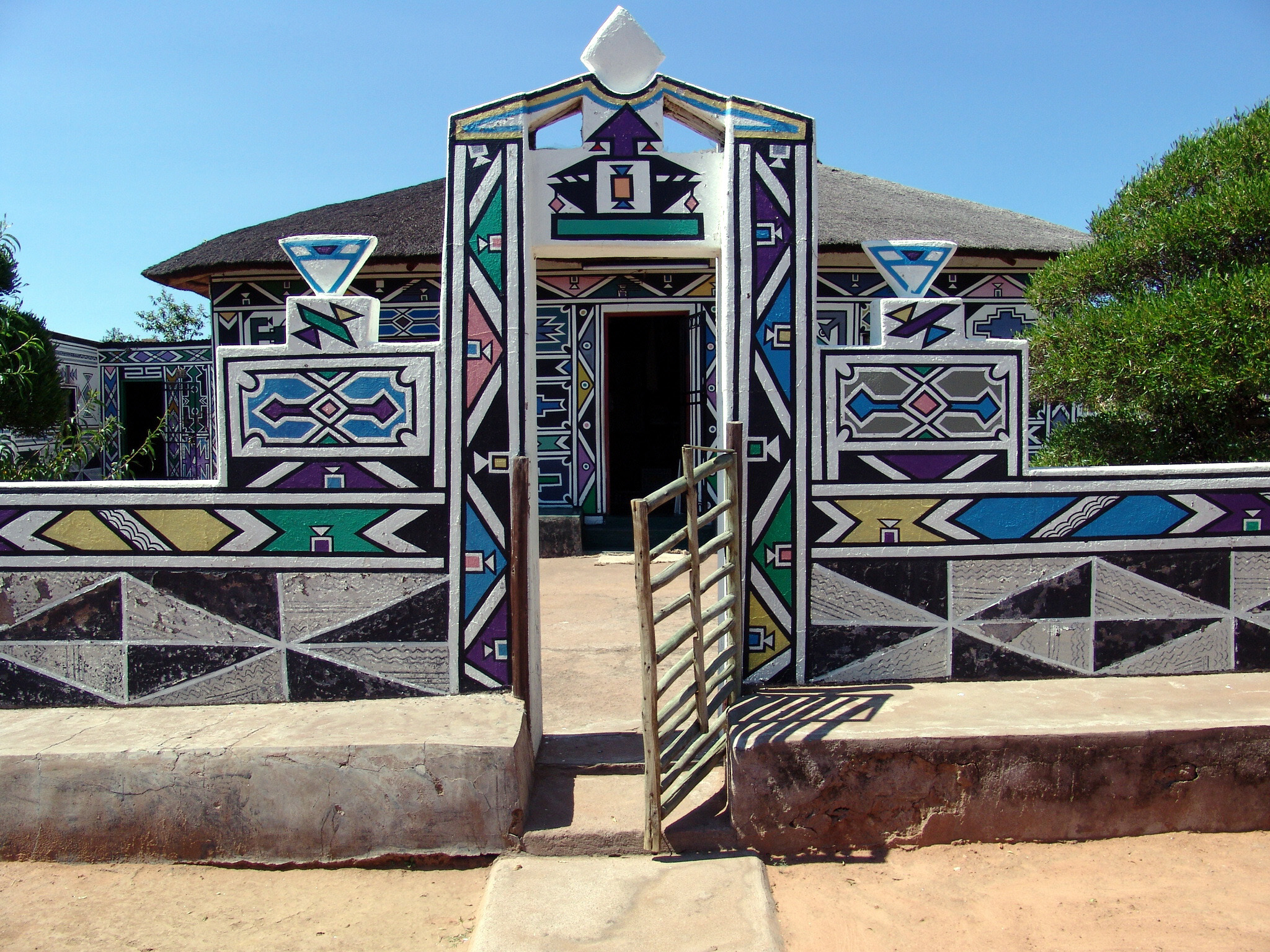
The entrance to Esther Mahlangu's homestead in Mapoch, South Africa

Mahlangu was born on 11 November 1935 on a farm outside Middelburg, Mpumalanga, South Africa. She is the eldest of nine children, with six brothers and two sisters, and is a member of the Southern Ndebele people. She began painting at the age of 10, having been taught by her mother and grandmother in accordance with Ndebele tradition, in which adolescent girls learn to paint in preparation for decorating the exterior of their homes after marriage.

== Career ==
Between 1980 and 1991, Mahlangu was a resident at the Botshabelo Historical Village, an open-air museum dedicated to educating visitors about Ndebele culture. She first received global recognition in 1989 at the Magiciens de la terre (Magicians of the Earth) group exhibition, held at the Centre Pompidou and Grand halle de la Villette in Paris. She was invited after researchers from the French Embassy, including associate curator André Magnin, visited South Africa in 1986 and saw the paintings on her home. Upon arriving in Paris, she found that exhibition organizers had constructed a full-scale replica of her house, which she painted before an audience of thousands. The exhibition aimed to challenge Eurocentrism in the art world by presenting contemporary art from non-Western countries, and its success brought Mahlangu's work to an international audience. During her two-month stay in France, she also completed a mural inside the Angoulême Museum of Fine Arts. By 1990, she had received invitations to paint murals internationally and to exhibit her work in more than 12 countries.

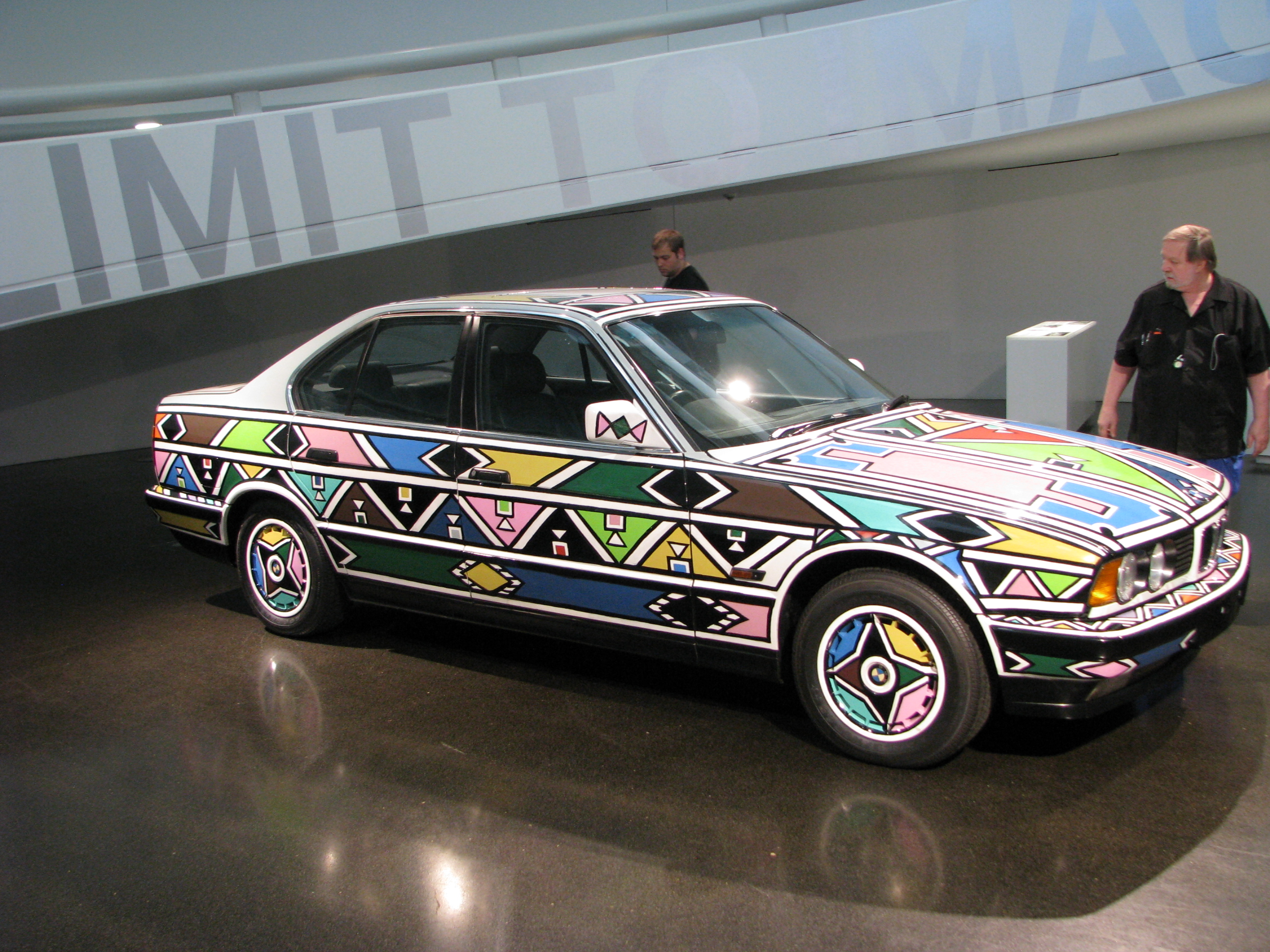
Mahlangu's BMW Art Car

In 1991, Mahlangu was commissioned by BMW to create an art car, joining earlier contributors such as Andy Warhol, David Hockney, and Frank Stella. She was the first non-Western artist and the first woman to design a BMW Art Car. The collaboration, intended to mark the end of apartheid, came five years after BMW opened a plant in Rosslyn, South Africa, and one year after Nelson Mandela was released from prison. Her design, painted on a BMW 525i, featured traditional Ndebele motifs and was her first work created on a surface other than a wall. The car was later exhibited at the National Museum of Women in the Arts in Washington, D.C., in 1994, and was featured in the exhibition South Africa: The Art of a Nation at the British Museum in London from October 2016 to February 2017.

In 1992, Mahlangu was commissioned to paint a five-story mural for the Johannesburg Civic Theatre.

In August 1994, Mahlangu travelled to the United States for the first time, where she created a mural at the National Museum of Women in the Arts to mark the opening of her solo exhibition, Esther Mahlangu, South African Muralist: The BMW Art Car and Related Works. The mural was painted on a vacant building that would soon become a new wing of the museum. To complete the mural, Mahlangu was assisted by her son Elias, American muralist Rachel Cross, volunteer Marion Levy, and another painter. She began painting on 25 August and continued until the exhibit opened on 15 September. During this period, pedestrians and motorists gathered daily to watch the artists at work. The exhibit ran until 13 November and included paintings on canvas, photographs of wall paintings, and her BMW Art Car.

In 2014, Mahlangu completed a one-month residency at the Virginia Museum of Fine Arts in Richmond, Virginia, during which she created two murals for the museum's African art gallery. Her work has been exhibited internationally, and her pieces are included in major private and institutional collections, including the Contemporary African Art Collection of Jean Pigozzi.

=== Other collaborations ===
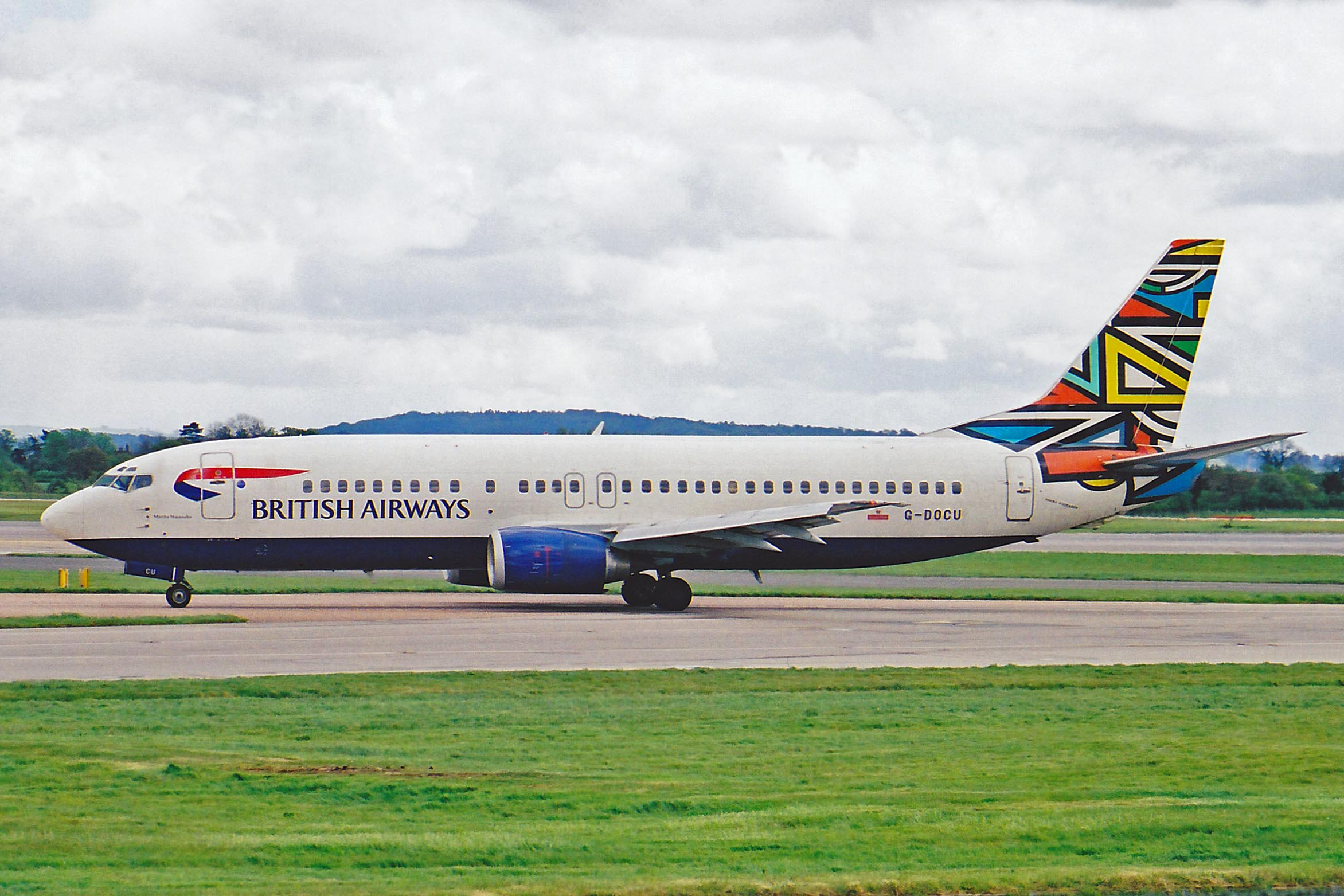
British Airways plane with tail fin painted by Mahlangu.

In 1997, Mahlangu was commissioned to paint the tail fins of several British Airways planes. In 2007, she painted a Fiat 500 for the Why Africa? exhibition in Turin, Italy. In 2016, she designed a Product Red bottle for Belvedere Vodka, with fifty percent of the proceeds donated to the Global Fund to fight HIV/AIDS, malaria, and tuberculosis. That same year, she collaborated with Swedish fashion brand Eytys to design a pair of sneakers featuring traditional Ndebele designs, marking the first use of embroidery in her work. She has also collaborated with Brazilian shoe brand Melissa as well as Japanese fashion label Comme des Garçons.

In 2016, Mahlangu painted the interior of a BMW 7 Series sedan which was exhibited at the Frieze Art Fair in Regent's Park, London, as part of a collection co-curated between BMW and 34FineArt. In 2020, she painted a custom interior for a Rolls-Royce Phantom, which includes a 'gallery' in the dashboard designed to display artwork. She was the first South African artist commissioned to create an artwork for the car. The work was displayed during Cape Town Art Week 2020 at The Melrose Gallery. In 2024, she collaborated with BMW to create the i5 Flow Nostokana, a concept car featuring a color-changing exterior adorned with Ndebele designs rendered using E Ink technology.

=== Education and cultural preservation ===
In 2024, an art studio dedicated to Mahlangu's work was opened at her home in Mpumalanga, South Africa. She previously established a self-funded art school in her backyard to teach Ndebele painting and design techniques to young artists.

== Exhibitions ==
Mahlangu has held numerous solo exhibitions in South Africa and internationally. Notable exhibitions include Esther Mahlangu, South African Muralist: The BMW Art Car and Related Works (1994) at the National Museum of Women in the Arts, her first solo exhibition; Esther Mahlangu (1998) at the Musée national des Arts d'Afrique et d'Océanie in Paris; Esther Mahlangu: An Artistic Residency (2014) at the Virginia Museum of Fine Arts; Where Two Rivers Meet (2023) at Almine Rech in London, and When Heart and Mind Agree (2025) at Jenkins Johnson Gallery in San Francisco.

In 2024, Mahlangu presented her first retrospective, Then I Knew I Was Good at Painting: Esther Mahlangu, a Retrospective, a 50-year travelling exhibition that originated at the Iziko South African National Gallery. The exhibition was curated by Nontobeko Ntombela.

She has also participated in numerous group exhibitions, including Magiciens de la Terre (1989), Documenta 9 (1992), and the Venice Biennale (2024), and has exhibited at international art fairs such as Frieze Art Fair (2016) and the Investec Cape Town Art Fair (2019).

== Style ==
Mahlangu is known for adapting Ndebele mural art, which is traditionally painted on adobe walls, to alternative surfaces such as canvas and metal alloys. Her signature designs often feature white-bounded lines arranged diagonally or in chevron patterns. Her compositions have been described as "more engaging and complex than that of her contemporaries," with particularly intricate border designs.

Mahlangu's art draws on patterns found in the traditional clothing and jewellery of the Ndebele people. Her designs are typically colourful and geometric, and her paintings are often large in scale, created using a paintbrush made from chicken feathers. She signs her beadwork using beads to form her initials.

== Awards and honours ==
In 2006, the Government of South Africa awarded Mahlangu the Order Of Ikhamanga in Silver for "excellent contribution to the development of the indigenous Ndebele arts." In 2019, she received the Southern Africa NGO and Multi-Stakeholder Award from the United Nations High Commissioner for Refugees. In April 2024, she received the Lifetime Achievement Award at the inaugural South African Creative Arts Awards. In July of the same year, she was bestowed with the Officier de L'Ordre des Arts et des Lettres by the French Ministry of Culture, becoming the fifth South African citizen to receive the award.

Mahlangu has also received several honorary degrees in recognition of her contributions to the arts and the preservation of Ndebele culture. In April 2018, she was awarded an honorary doctorate by the University of Johannesburg in recognition of her cultural legacy. That same year, the Durban University of Technology conferred upon her an honorary doctorate in visual and performing arts, acknowledging her role in promoting Ndebele heritage. In 2022, the Tshwane University of Technology awarded Mahlangu an honorary doctorate in arts and design. In 2024, she received an honorary Doctor of Philosophy in mathematics from the University of South Africa in recognition of her artistic career and "mathematical prowess."

== Personal life ==
Mahlangu married her husband in 1947. The couple had three sons; she outlived both her husband and all three children.

On 19 March 2022, Mahlangu was assaulted and robbed in her home, during which money and a personal firearm were stolen. Police launched a manhunt, and two suspects were later arrested and charged with house robbery and possession of an unlawful firearm.
