= Cassils (artist) =

Canadian artist, body builder, and personal trainer

Cassils is a visual and performance artist, body builder, and personal trainer from Montreal, Quebec, Canada now based in Los Angeles, California, United States. Their work uses the body in a sculptural fashion, integrating feminism, body art, and gay male aesthetics. Cassils is the recipient of a Guggenheim Fellowship, a Creative Capital Grant, a United States Artists Fellowship, a California Community Foundation Visual Artist Fellowship (2012), several Canada Council for the Arts grants, and the Rema Hort Mann Foundation Visual Arts Fellowship. Cassils is gender non-conforming, transmasculine, and goes by singular they pronouns.

== Education ==
In 1997, Cassils received a BFA from Nova Scotia College of Art and Design (NSCAD) in Halifax, Canada. NSCAD's unconventional curriculum (where figure drawing classes included nude models jumping on a trampoline) and its faculty (in particular Jan Peacock and Garry Neil Kennedy) influenced their early political and feminist work in video and performance.

Upon graduating from NSCAD in 1997, Cassils moved to New York City in 1997, interning at the Franklin Furnace assisting Martha Wilson with the digitization of the archive. In this context, they created early exhibitions and performances at the Holland Tunnel Gallery (1998), the Limelight, and PS122. Cassils left in 2000 to attend California Institute of the Arts on a merit scholarship; they received an MFA in 2002.

== Collaborative practice with the Toxic Titties ==
At CalArts, Cassils, Clover Leary, and Julia Steinmetz co-founded the Toxic Titties, a performance collective that was active for nearly a decade. Toxic Titties performed and exhibited nationally at such locations as: the Advocate Gallery (2000), Track 16 Gallery (2002), the California Institute of the Arts (2001–02), Michael Dawson Gallery (2002), LA FreeWaves Festival (2002), Intersectional Feminisms conference at UC Riverside in Los Angeles (2002), REDCAT at the Walt Disney Concert Hall (2003), Center on Contemporary Art, Seattle (2005), USC Center for Feminist Research, Los Angeles (2006), Art in General (2006), Los Angeles Contemporary Exhibitions, Los Angeles (2008) and Yerba Buena Center for the Arts (YBCA) San Francisco, CA (2009).

Internationally Toxic Titties exhibited at Manifesta in Frankfurt, Germany (2000), Schnitt Ausstellungsraum in Cologne, Germany (2000), Outside Field: International Festival, Ex-Teresa Arte Actual, Mexico City (2003), and MUCA Roma, Mexico City (2003). In collaboration with artist Dorit Margrieter, they created the 16mm film 10104 Angelo View Drive, a work set in John Lautner's modernist Sheats-Goldstein Residence in Beverly Hills exploring the relationship between architecture and desire. This project was featured in solo exhibitions at Art Basel Miami Beach and at MUMOK, the Museum Moderner Kunst Stiftung Ludwig Wien, Vienna, Austria (2006), as well as at Trinity Square Video in Toronto, Canada (2008).

The Toxic Titties' work received critical attention from significant scholars such as Amelia Jones, Jennifer Doyle, Christine Ross, and José Esteban Muñoz. Many of these scholars first encountered the work of the Toxic Titties when Cassils and Leary were hired to perform in Vanessa Beecroft's VB46 at the Gagosian Gallery in Beverly Hills. Having infiltrated the behind the scenes process of Beecroft's practice, they launched a parasitical performance, Beecroft Intervention (2001). Undermining power structures of identity, class, feminism and art commerce, Toxic Titties hijacked Beecroft's piece by engaging the female performers, who had been homogenized and objectified, in critical dialogue. Their influence unionized the group and forced an increase in the cost of their labor. They documented this performance through the essay Behind Enemy Lines: Toxic Titties Infiltrate Vanessa Beecroft published in Signs: Journal of Women and Culture in Society (2006), and reprinted in Art Metropole's Commerce By Artists (2011).

== Emerging solo career ==
In 2007, Cassils was awarded a merit scholarship to participate in a residency program at the Banff Centre for the Arts and a Creation Grant from the Canada Council of the Arts Intra Arts department, which allowed them to create an experimental documentary and performance titled Simulation In Training. This piece investigated the theater of war present in the American mass media, and demonstrated the overlap between Hollywood and the military–industrial complex.

In 2009, Cassils won the Franklin Furnace Performance Art Fund for the performance Hard Times, their first piece integrating these aesthetic, physical and political concerns. The resulting film was subsequently screened at the Asian Experimental Video Festival in Hong Kong, China, Festival Ciné à Dos in Koulikoro, Mali, at Art Cinema Zawya in Cairo, Egypt. and Cultureel tetras de Kaaij, Nijmegen in the Netherlands.

Next Cassils created the performance Tiresias, a five-hour durational performance for an exhibition at Los Angeles Contemporary Exhibitions called Gutted (2010). During the live performance they used their body heat to melt a neoclassical Greek male torso carved out of ice, recasting the myth of Tiresias as a story of endurance and transformation. Cassils has performed Tiresias at the ANTI International Contemporary Art Festival in Kuopio Finland (2012); at the FADO Performance Art Center in Toronto, Canada; at the City Of Women Festival in conjunction with The Kapelica Gallery in Ljubljana Slovenia; at the Performatorium Festival of Queer Performance, Regina, Canada (2013); and at Performance Studies International at Stanford University (2013). Most recently the piece was installed at the National Gallery of Art in Sopot, Poland (2015). Articles about Tiresias have appeared in well respected academic journals, including an essay in The Drama Review by Maurya Wickstrom, and another in Performance Research Journal by Megan Hoetger. Both journals featured images from the performance on their cover (2014).

== Mid-career achievements ==
In 2010, Cassils was awarded a Los Angeles Contemporary Exhibitions Artist Research Grant as part of LACE's contribution to Pacific Standard Time, an initiative of the Getty with arts institutions across Southern California, showcasing cultural production from 1945 to 1980. LACE chose Cassils to make a new performance for their exhibition Los Angeles Goes Live: Exploring a Social History of Performance Art in Southern California (LAGA) in which they were invited to use LACE's archive as a springboard from which to create a new work. Cassils created Cuts: A Traditional Sculpture, a large body of work that began with a six-month durational performance and generated video installations, photographs, watercolors, and a magazine. This performance is a reinterpretation of Eleanor Antin's 1972 performance Carving: A Traditional Sculpture, in which Antin crash dieted for 45 days and documented her body daily with photographs from four vantage points. Instead, Cassils used their mastery of bodybuilding and nutrition to gain 23 pounds of muscle over 23 weeks, transforming their physique into a traditionally masculine muscular form. Elements from CUTS have been exhibited at Rutgers University, the Stamp Gallery at the University of Maryland, the Utah Museum of Contemporary Art (2013), as well as at SOMArts San Francisco, and MU Art Space, Eindhoven, the Netherlands (2014).

Cassils also collaborated with photographer and makeup artist Robin Black to create Advertisement: Homage to Benglis, in which Cassils staged a series of self-empowered representations of trans embodiment, substituting a ripped masculine physique for Benglis's double-ended phallus. This piece received critical acclaim and became the subject articles in the LA Weekly (2011), and X-Tra Contemporary Art Quarterly (2012). It is a key subject of Lianne McTavish's book Feminist Figure Girl: Look Hot While You Fight The Patriarchy (2015), and was featured in the publication Art and Queer Culture by Richard Meyer and Catherine Lord (2013). Advertisement: Homage to Benglis was featured in Cassils's solo exhibition at Ronald Feldman Fine Arts, BODY OF WORK, and it is currently on view and being used as the key art for an exhibition in Berlin at the Schwules Museum* and Deutsches Historisches Museum called Homosexualities (2015). The film Fast Twitch// Slow Twitch, also part of the CUTS series, was screened at Moving Image Fair, and the ICA London, UK in 2013, as well as at screenings at the Armory Center for the Arts in Pasadena, the This Is What I Want Festival in San Francisco (2012) the Dirty Looks On Location Festival in NY, and Festival Everybody's Perfect in Geneva, Switzerland.

=== Becoming an Image ===
In 2012, Cassils commenced a new body of work called Becoming An Image, originally conceived as a site-specific work for the ONE National Gay & Lesbian Archives in Los Angeles, the oldest active LGBTQ archive in the United States. Becoming an Image has been exhibited widely, including: Material Traces: Time and Gesture in Contemporary Art curated by Amelia Jones (2013); The Edgy Woman Festival in Montreal, Canada (2013); SPILL International Performance Festival in London, Fierce Festival in Birmingham, UK. (2013); in Cassils' solo exhibitions BODY OF WORK, at Ronald Feldman Fine Arts in New York and Cassils: Compositions at Trinity Square Video in Toronto.

Becoming an Image is a multi-medium work, beginning with a performance piece by Cassils. First performed in 2012, the artist brings viewers into a darkened room, where within sits a 2,000 pound block of wet clay. As the performance begins, all light in the room will be darkened until the only sensory input comes from the sounds of Cassils utilizing their physical training to attack the clay. This attack is intermittently lit by camera flashes. The newly shaped clay is displayed for the remainder of time Becoming an Image is exhibited, accompanied by Ghost, a four channel sound installation which recreates the sounds of exertion created by Cassils during the performance, the four channels allowing the disembodied sounds to seemingly move around the listener. In more recent iterations of Becoming an Image, previous images of Cassils performing the pieces are installed within the exhibit.

Becoming an Image has received significant positive critical reception. and written about by Jennifer Doyle and David Getsy. Getsy subsequently wrote about the performance and the related sculpture, The Resilience of the 20%, as the conclusion to his 2015 book Abstract Bodies. Becoming an Image was reviewed positively on the cover of the arts section of The Guardian newspaper in London, UK (2013), as well as in publications including The Huffington Post, The Daily Beast, Artsy Editorial, and C File Magazine, and Canadian Broadcasting Corporation (CBC). Additionally, Amelia Jones published writings on Cassils's solo practice in Reading Contemporary Performance: Theatricality Across Genres, co-edited with Gabrielle Cody (2015).

In 2015 Cassils was awarded a Creative Capital Grant to cast in bronze the sculptures called The Resilience of the 20% or the Monument Project, which were used in their 2017 performance piece Monument Push. In addition to the Creative Capital Grant, Cassils has been awarded numerous grants and awards including a California Community Foundation Visual Artist Fellowship (2012), and a two-year Canada Council for the Arts, Long Term Assistance Grant to Visual Artists (2012–2014). Cassils was awarded a MOTHA Art Awards (Museum of Transgender Hirstory and Art) for Best Solo Exhibition of 2013, for their show at Ronald Feldman Fine Arts. and first ever appointed ANTI Festival International Prize for Live Art.

Incendiary, Cassils first European solo show was at MU in the Netherlands in 2015. This exhibition was the largest and most ambitious to date and featured live performances and the resulting performative objects. The first monograph on Cassils's work was published by IDEA press in conjunction with the exhibition.

== Collaborations ==
Cassils features in the music video for Lady Gaga's song "Telephone" from Gaga's 2009 album The Fame Monster.

Cassils choreographed a music video by LCD Soundsystem (commercial for Gillette) directed by Michel Gondry. Cassils' job was to match the athlete's movements with the beats and sounds the musicians wanted to generate, creating a physical symphony.

Cassils won a competition to create the album cover for Black Sabbath's single "God is Dead?". Cassils collaborated with designer Cathy Davies on this project.

== Exhibitions ==
=== Solo exhibitions ===
- 2018: "Cassils: SOLUTIONS" Station Museum, Houston, TX
- 2019: Perth Museum of Contemporary Art, Australia
- 2020 Walter Phillips Gallery, BANFF Center for Arts and Creativity, BANFF, Canada
- 2021 "Human Measure" HOME Manchester, Manchester, UK
- 2021 "$HT Coin by 'White Male Artist'", Phillips Gallery One, NYC, NY
- 2022 SITE Santa Fe, Sante Fe, New Mexico
- 2023 Walter Phillips Gallery, Banff Center for the Arts, Alberta
- 2023 Ana Anna Leonowens Gallery, Halifax, Nova Scotia
- 2024 "Cassils: Movement" Walter Phillips Gallery, Banff Center for the Arts, Alberta

== Publications ==
- David Getsy, "Abstraction and the Unforeclosed," in Abstract Bodies: Sixties Sculpture in the Expanded Field of Gender (Yale University Press, 2015)
- Amelia Jones, Reading Contemporary Performance: Theatricality Across Genres, coedited with Gabrielle Cody (London: Routledge: 20152013)
- Lianne McTavish, Feminist Figure Girl Look Hot While You Fight The Patriarchy. State University of New York Press. 2015
- Richard Meyer and Catherine Lord, Art and Queer Culture, Phaidon Press, London, UK
- "Behind Enemy Lines: Toxic Titties Infiltrate Vanassa Beecroft", Heather Cassils, Clover Leary, Julia Steinmetz. Luis Jacob, Commerce by Artists, Art Metropole, pp 318–335
- Eliza Steinbock, Photographic Flashes: On Imaging Trans Violence in Heather Cassils' Durational Art (Photography and Culture, Volume 7, Issue 3, 2014)

== Awards ==
- 2009 Franklin Furnace Performance Art Fund
- 2012 (CCF) California Community Foundation Visual Artist Fellowship
- 2013 MOTHA Art Awards (Museum of Transgender Hirstory & Art) for Best Solo Exhibition of 2013
- 2014 Rema Hort Mann Foundation Visual Arts Fellowship
- 2014 ANTI Festival International Prize for Live Art
- 2015 Creative Capital Visual Artist Award
- 2017 Guggenheim Fellowship
- 2017 COLA Individual Artist Fellowship
- 2018 Fellowship, The Rockefeller Foundation, Bellagio Center
- 2018 United States Artists Fellowship
- 2018 Herb Alpert/MacDowell Fellowship, Theater
- 2019 Canada Council for the Arts Explore and Create Grant
- 2019 Canada Council for the Arts Touring Grant
- 2019 Canada Council for the Arts Travel Grant
- 2020 Princeton Arts Fellowship Finalist
- 2020 Art Matters Foundation (for In Plain Sight)
- 2020 Andy Warol (for In Plain Sight)
- 2020 Agnus Gund (for In Plain Sight)
- 2020 Krupp Family Foundation (for In Plain Sight)
- 2020 Quiet Foundation (for In Plain Sight)
- 2020 Center for Cultural Power (for In Plain Sight)
- 2020 Occidental College of the Arts (for In Plain Sight)
- 2020 Museum of Contemporary Art Los Angeles (for In Plain Sight)
- 2020 Goodworks Foundation (for In Plain Sight)
- 2020 For Freedoms (for In Plain Sight)
- 2020 Canada Council for the Arts Explore and Create Grant Three Year Consolidation Support Grant
- 2020 Fleck Fellowship & Residency, BANFF Centre for Arts and Creativity
- 2021 Art Matters Foundation Artist 2 Artist Fellowship
- 2021 Canada Council for the Arts Residency Grant
- 2021 Canada Council for the Arts Travel Grant
- INMATT Foundation Grant
