= Fealy =

Fealy is a surname. Notable people with the surname include:

- Barbara Fealy (1903–2000), American landscape architect
- Maude Fealy (1883–1971), American actress

== See also ==
- Feely
