= John Storrs =

John Storrs may refer to:

- John Storrs (sculptor)
- John Storrs (architect)
- John Storrs (priest)

== See also ==
- J. Storrs Hall, American nanotechnologist
- John Storr, Royal Navy officer
