= Christine Ross =

Christine Ross may refer to:

- Christine Ross (art historian)
- Christine Ross (rugby union)
- Christine Ross Barker, née Ross, Canadian pacifist and suffragist
