= Oregon College of Art and Craft =

Former art school from 1907 to 2019 in Portland, Oregon

- Motto: Make. Here. Now.
- Type: Private college
- Active: 1907–2019
- President: Jiseon Lee Isbara
- Undergraduates: 140
- Location: Portland, Oregon, United States; 45°30′38″N 122°45′43″W
- Website: ocac.edu

The Oregon College of Art and Craft (OCAC) was a private art college from 1907 to 2019 in Portland, Oregon, United States.

The college granted Bachelor of Fine Arts and Master of Fine Arts degrees as well as art-focused certificates. The college offered an Artist-in-Residence program and provided continuing education in the arts to the local community. It was founded by Julia Christiansen Hoffman, a photographer, painter, sculptor, metal worker and weaver, out of her desire to foster the Arts and Crafts movement through classes and exhibitions. The college closed at the end of the spring 2019 semester.

== History ==
The college was founded in September 1907 as the Arts and Crafts Society. Initial classes were held in the homes of members of the society, and included classes on sculpting, painting, metal works, and photography, among others. The school moved to a permanent site in Downtown Portland, the Kramer Building, in 1934 before merging with the Allied Art and Metal Guild in 1952. After the merger, the combined schools moved to Northwest Portland where in 1962 they moved into a larger space at a former hospital building.

The school grew and became known as the "Oregon School of Arts & Crafts" in 1978. Also that year, the school expanded its campus, adding 46,000 square feet (4,300 m^{2}) of space at a cost of $1.5 million. Architect John Storrs designed the new campus. The college began offering a bachelor of fine arts degree in 1994.

In 1996, the school changed its name to reflect its college status, from "Oregon School of Arts and Crafts" to the "Oregon College of Art and Craft".

About 2005 the school started a capital campaign in order to raise over $14 million to expand the campus and double the size of their facilities. Plans called for a new library and studios for their painting, drawing, and photography programs that would add 55,000 square feet (5,100 m^{2}) of space on campus. In September 2008, a groundbreaking ceremony was held for the 15,000 square feet (1,400 m^{2}) studios building, with plans calling for completion in summer 2009. The building opened in September 2010 as the Jean Vollum Drawing, Painting and Photography Building. Plans for the new library, however, fell through.

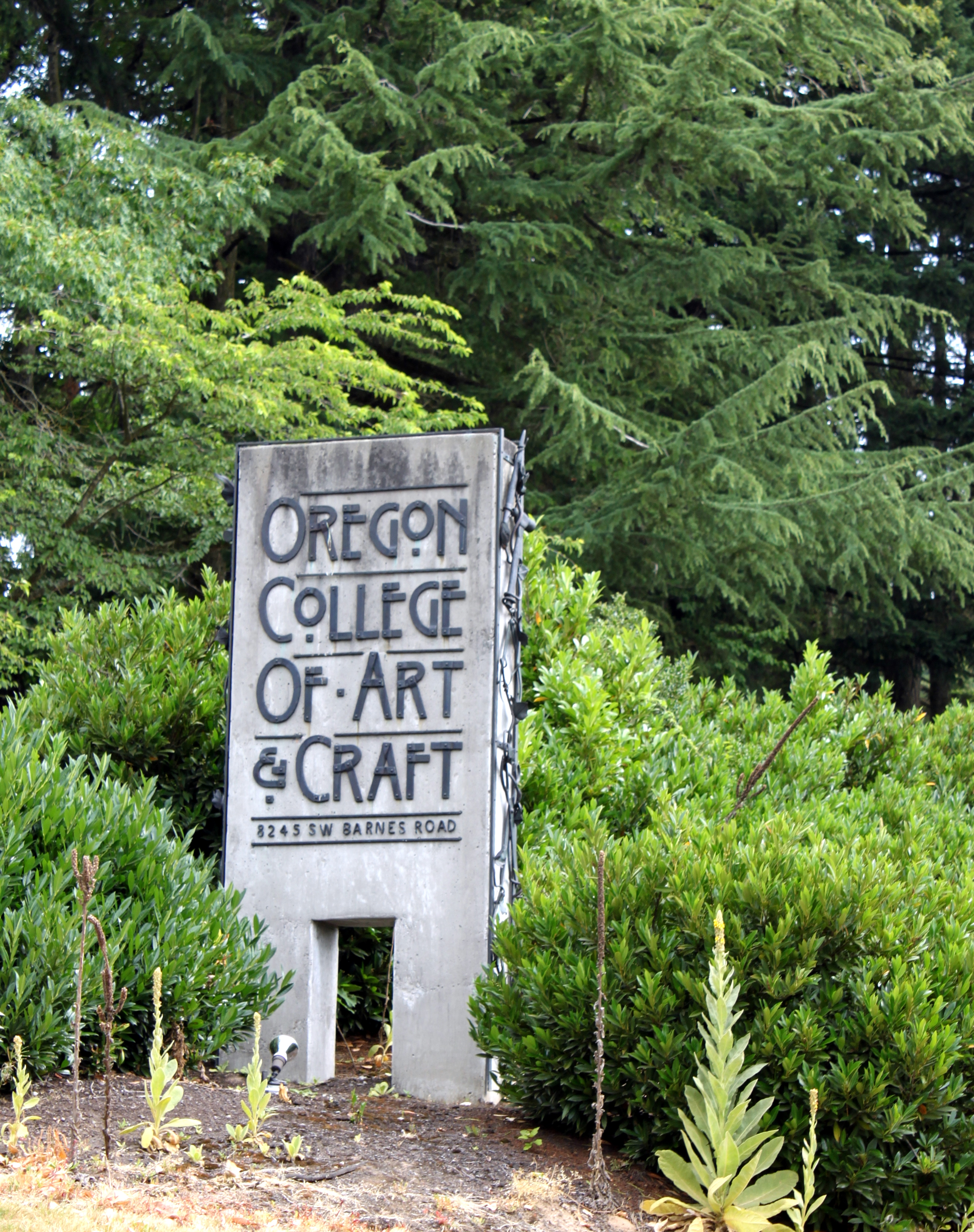
Entrance to the school

OCAC announced a joint master's in fine art program for applied craft and design with the Pacific Northwest College of Art in October 2008. College president Bonnie Laing Malcolmson announced her resignation in December 2009, effective May 2010. Denise Mullen was then named as president of the school in June 2010, taking office on August 23. The college added a masters in fine arts in applied craft and design offered in collaboration with the Pacific Northwest College of Art. in 2011. In fall 2013, OCAC began offering a Master in Fine Arts in craft.

Throughout the 2010s, the college explored many restructuring options to address the rising costs of running a small art college. In late 2018, the college briefly explored merging with the Pacific Northwest College of Art but both institutions' boards decided against the merger. In early 2019, Portland State University announced that it would not continue discussions on a possible merger that would bring OCAC into PSU. A few months later, after collecting spring tuition, the college's board of trustees decided to close the college at the end of the spring 2019 semester, leaving hundreds of students to abruptly find continuing education options without financial refund for an incomplete final semester. In April 2019 the campus was sold to the nearby Catlin Gabel School for $6.5 million, which plans to use it for an expanded middle school.

== Academics ==
Enrollment in the BFA program ranged from 140-200 full-time students. Most students were between 18 and 27 years old. The college's MFA program held 10 full-time students. The Continuing Education and Art Adventures children's programs served more than 2,000 students per year.

The school was a member of the Association of Independent Colleges of Art and Design(AICAD) and was accredited by the National Association of Schools of Art and Design (NASAD) and the Northwest Commission on Colleges and Universities (NWCCU). The school's library held more than 9,000 books and was a member of the Washington County Cooperative Library Services (WCCLS).

== Faculty ==
OCAC employed around 15 full-time faculty and 8 part-time faculty in the degree program, as well as a number of instructors in the Studio School continuing education program.

== Campus ==
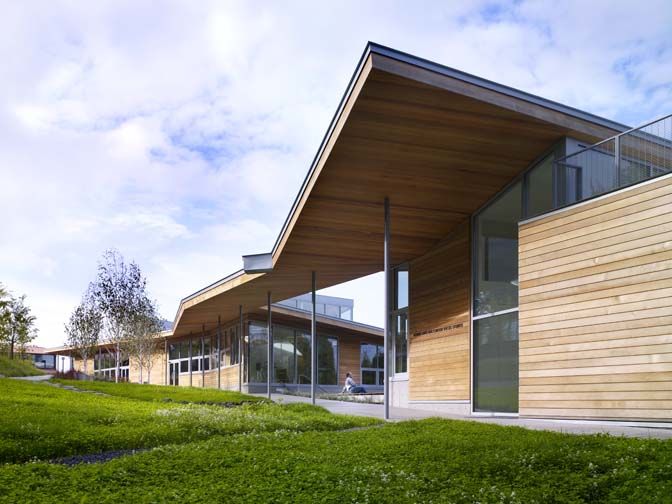
Jean Vollum Drawing, Painting, and Photography Building

OCAC was located on a wooded 9.5-acre (38,000 m^{2}) campus, approximately 3 miles from Downtown Portland in unincorporated Washington County. The campus was designed by Barbara Fealy, a landscape architect, and John Storrs, a Portland architect.

=== Centrum ===
The Centrum was the primary building and hub of the campus. It housed the front desk, school shop, the Hoffman Gallery, the campus' IT office and computer lab, and Nicoletta's Cafe.

=== Cafe ===
OCAC long held a strong relationship with the Hands On Cafe, serving the campus gourmet comfort foods for many years. With the retirement of a family member, the family owning the café decided not to renew their contract with the college in late 2013. Beginning on January 20, 2014, Leather Storrs, son of architect John Storrs, took up a lease with the college for the café space, continuing his family's legacy and connection to OCAC. Storrs' Eight|Three|One Cafe served similarly styled food to the Hands On team, maintaining the rustic at-home feel the campus provided.

=== Library ===
The OCAC Library was located in the Yellow House, owned by the college. Residing in the basement level of the remodeled house, the library provided access to a unique collection of diverse resources that supportrd curricular and research activities at OCAC. The library held more than 10,000 materials, including books, student theses, media, ephemera and more pertaining to fine art and craft. The library housed a slide library made up of 28,000 slides and also subscribed to over 90 periodicals (magazines) and four primary art databases for community use. The library was a participating member of the Washington County Cooperative Library Services, which gave OCAC students, faculty and staff access to over a million library resources and dozens of additional databases. Although the Library was dedicated to supporting the College community, it was also open to the public for research and checkout.

The library facility was staffed by a librarian (the Director of library Services) and 8-10 student workers. Operating from 9am to 5pm most days, the librarian assisted students in research of art, craft, technique and more. In addition, staff held events in the library and on campus. These included knitting circles, resume workshops, class lectures, and other events to support the students' progress through their education.

== Art On the Vine ==
Art On the Vine was OCAC's yearly gala and fundraiser. All proceeds directly supported scholarship funding for BFA and MFA students, and for youth attending OCAC's Art Adventures Camps. The event featured a silent auction of roughly 120 pieces of art (including student works, faculty, alum, local artists and beyond) and roughly 35 wine packages.

== Notable alumni ==
- Mary Catherine Lamb
- Cynthia Lahti
- Tuesday Smillie
