= Tuesday Smillie =

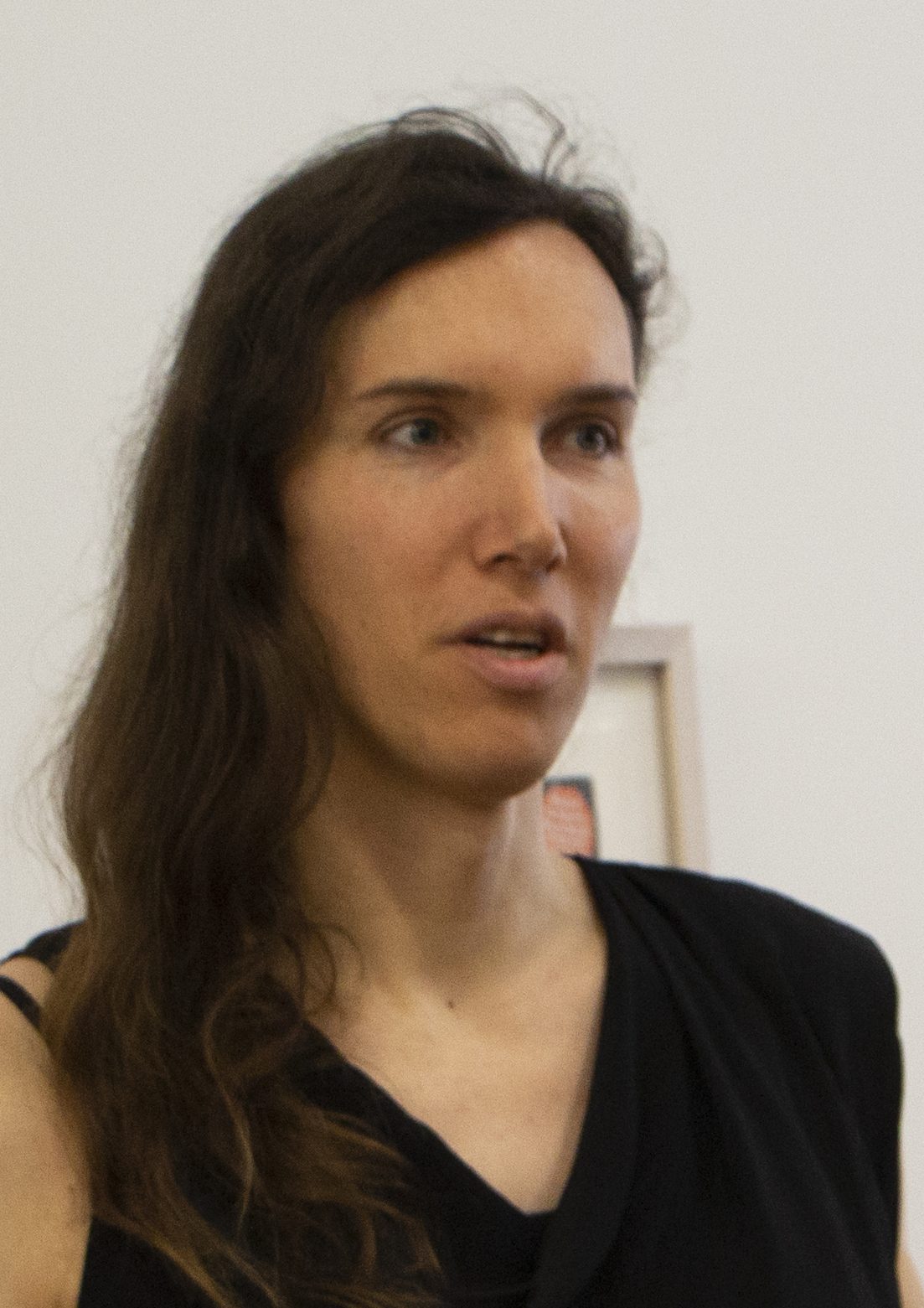
Tuesday Smillie at Participant Inc, 2018

Tuesday Smillie (born 1981 in Boston, Massachusetts) is an American interdisciplinary artist based in Brooklyn, New York. Her work focuses on trans-feminist politics and the aesthetics of protest.

Smillie has been recognized for her reinterpretation of protest banners through traditional craft materials. Writer Johanna Fateman describes work like Smillie's Street Transvestites 1973 (2015) as "ornate, meticulously sewn and painted trans-liberation banners" that "could not get their radical point across more lovingly."

== Life and work ==
Smillie holds a BFA from Oregon College of Art and Craft (OCAC) with a concentration in Book Arts.

Many of Smillie's collections take inspiration from feminist science fiction author Ursula K. Le Guin, primarily her novel The Left Hand of Darkness about gender-fluid inhabitants of the planet Gethen. Smillie has held solo exhibitions at the Rose Art Museum, Participant Inc, and her work has been included in group exhibitions at the Rubin Museum of Art, Artists Space, Brooklyn Museum, and the New Museum. She led a Study Session at the Whitney Museum of American Art. Smillie's work has been featured in several news sources of prestige including Artforum, ARTnews, Wall Street International Magazine and The Boston Globe. She was the first resident artist of the Museum Of Transgender Hirstory & Art (MOTHA).

In 2016 a series of watercolor paintings inspired by LeGuin’s novel were displayed at Haverford College. The exhibition was organized by the Haverford College Libraries in conjunction with the exhibition “Bring Your Own Body: transgender between aesthetics and archives," an exhibit curated by Jeanne Vaccaro and Stamatina Gregory at the 41 Cooper Gallery in New York.

In 2018, she had two solo exhibitions and one group exhibition: "Reflecting Light into The Unshadow," which ran from 1 July until 5 August at Participant Inc. located in New York, "To build another world," which ran from 7 September through 9 December at the Rose Art Museum, and “Face of the Future," which ran through 4 November at The Rubin Museum of Art. Taking the Le Guin novel The Left Hand of Darkness as inspiration, Smillie displayed an array of textile collages and banners as well as prints and works on paper including several watercolor paintings. In "Face of the Future," contemporary artists were challenged to create artwork taking inspiration from the classical sci-fi genre as well as their own imaginings of the future. Smillie’s work was presented alongside works by Maia Cruz Palileo, Tammy Nguyen, Sahana Ramakrishnan and Anuj Shrestha.

== Awards and residencies ==
=== Awards ===
- Rose Art Museum's Ruth Ann and Nathan Perlmutter Artist-in-Residence Award
- Grant from Art Matters

=== Residencies ===
- Kala Art Institute
- Freehold Art Exchange in New York
- The Museum of Transgender Hirstory and Art's inaugural artist residency

== Exhibitions ==
Selected solo exhibitions

- Reflecting Light Into The Unshadow, Participant Inc. (2018)
- To build another world, Rose Art Museum at Brandeis University (2018)
- The Right Brain of Darkness, Haverford College (2016)

Selected group exhibitions

- Nobody Promised You Tomorrow, Brooklyn Museum (2019)
- Feminist Histories, São Paulo Museum of Art (2019)
- Face of the Future, Rubin Museum (2018)
- Trigger: Gender As A Tool And A Weapon, New Museum (2017)
