= Julia Christiansen Hoffman =

American artist (1856–1934)

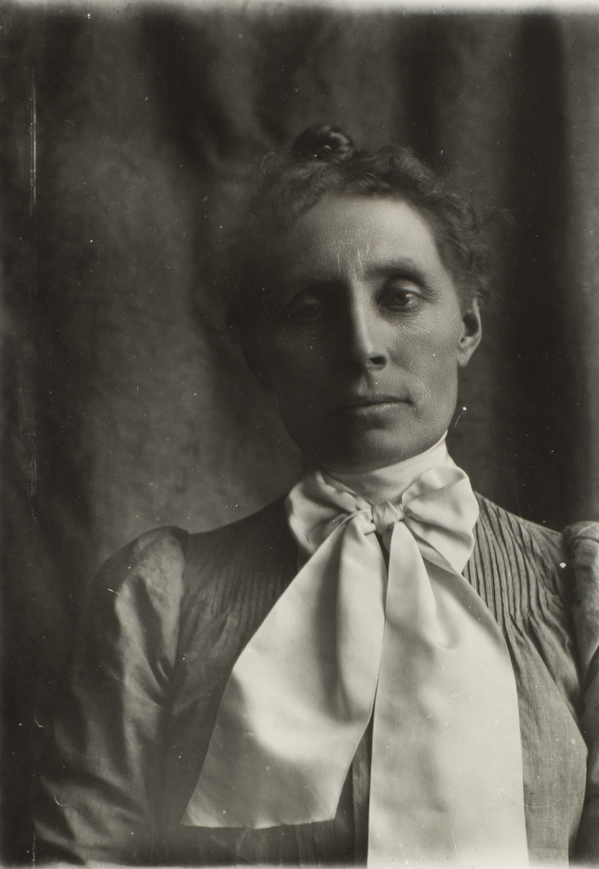
- Self-portrait, ca. 1890s
- Born: Julia Elizabeth Christiansen; March 30, 1856; Manti, Utah, U.S.
- Died: November 30, 1934 (aged 78); Portland, Oregon, U.S.
- Resting place: Riverview Cemetery, Portland, Oregon
- Known for: Arts and Crafts Society of Portland
- Movement: Arts and Crafts
- Spouse: Lee Hoffman
- Children: 2, including Margery Hoffman Smith
- Honours: eponym of Hoffman Gallery at the Oregon College of Art and Craft

Julia Christiansen Hoffman (March 30, 1856 – November 30, 1934) was an American artist and arts patron who fostered the Portland Arts and Crafts movement in the state of Oregon, through exhibitions and art classes. In 1907 she led the establishment of the Arts and Crafts Society of Portland, a forerunner of the Oregon College of Art and Craft (OCAC).

== Biography ==
Julia Elizabeth Christiansen, daughter of Danish immigrants Hamond and Elizabeth Christiansen, was born March 30, 1856, in Manti, Sanpete County, Utah, northeast of Gunnison. She moved to Portland in 1881, and in 1883 married Lee Hoffman (1850–1895), a Portland builder. In 1887, when he completed the Morrison Bridge, the first bridge across the Willamette River, Julia Christiansen Hoffman was "the first person to 'walk across the Willamette' ". The Hoffmans had two children: their son Lee Hawley was born in 1884, and daughter Margery was born in 1888.

Hoffman's husband died in a shooting accident in 1895, and Hoffman moved her family to Boston, seeking better educational opportunities for her children. In the late 1890s, Hoffman joined the Society of Arts and Crafts, Boston; she took classes at Grundemann Studios of the Boston Art Students' Association, and studied with master silversmith George Christian Gebelein. She made trips at least annually back to Portland, and in 1902 became the first lifetime member of the Portland Art Association, precursor of the Portland Art Museum. She provided the salary of the first design instructor of the Museum Art School, precursor of Pacific Northwest College of Art (PNCA). By the summer of 1906, she returned to make Portland her permanent residence, studying with Frank Dumond.

== Arts and Crafts Society of Portland ==
At the Portland Art Museum on October 7, 1907, Hoffman was among 150 people who met to establish the Arts and Crafts Society of Portland, which became the Oregon School of Arts and Crafts in 1978, and Oregon College of Art and Craft in 1996. Hoffman was a "photographer, painter, sculptor, metal worker and weaver" who wanted "to foster the Arts and Crafts movement through classes and exhibitions". According to Richard S. Christen, she was also "one of Portland's leading citizens and perhaps its most avid craftsperson". Christen wrote, "More than any other individual, Hoffman had generated an interest in handicrafts in the city. She also helped draft the new society's constitution and bylaws and, as one of its original trustees, its second president, and its primary spokesperson for thirty years, infused the institution with her vision of arts and crafts."

Hoffman made arrangements with Henrietta Failing, curator of the Portland Art Museum, to exhibit "top-flight craft work" of "America's most successful and respected craft artists". Portland's weekly Spectator said it was "the most interesting and instructive exhibit ever given at the museum".

Hoffman believed the Arts and Crafts Society of Portland could help improve the lives of blue collar workers and their families, and she sought a wide variety of accessible venues to sponsor activities and exhibits — "fairs, schools, libraries, department stores". Her daughter Margery Hoffman Smith wrote that her mother "felt strongly that there is a creative impulse in all human beings that needs outlet... for such impulses to be expressed was essential for the well being of the individual".

On November 6, 1934, Hoffman was struck by a car as she was crossing a Portland street. She sustained a concussion and a broken shoulder, and she died less than a month later, on November 30, 1934.

Hoffman Gallery at OCAC is named in her honor.

== Photographs ==
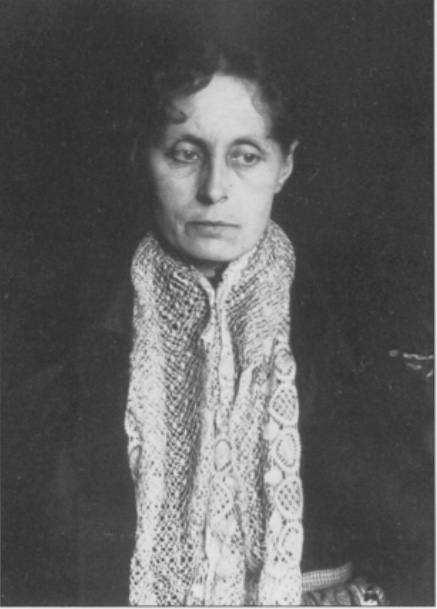
Self portrait, 1885

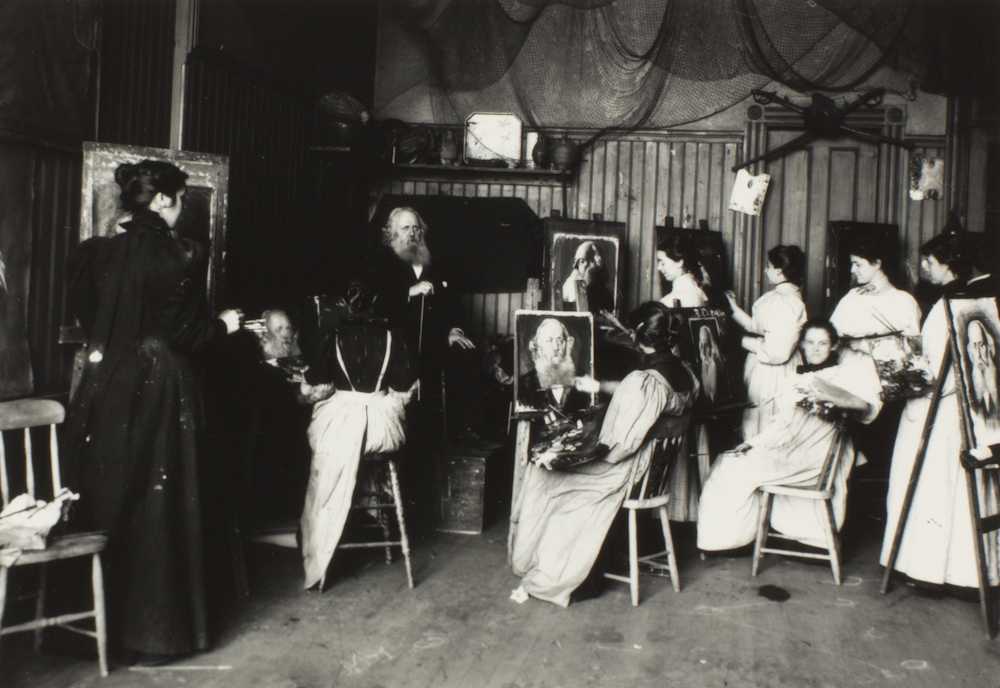
Painting class taught by Frank DuMond in Christiansen Hoffman's studio, ca. 1895

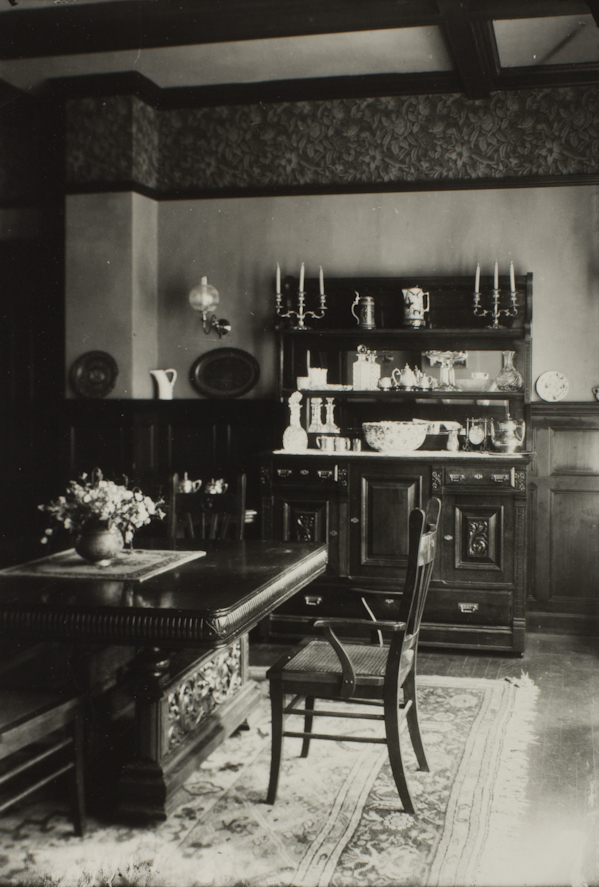
714 Everett Street, Portland, ca. 1890

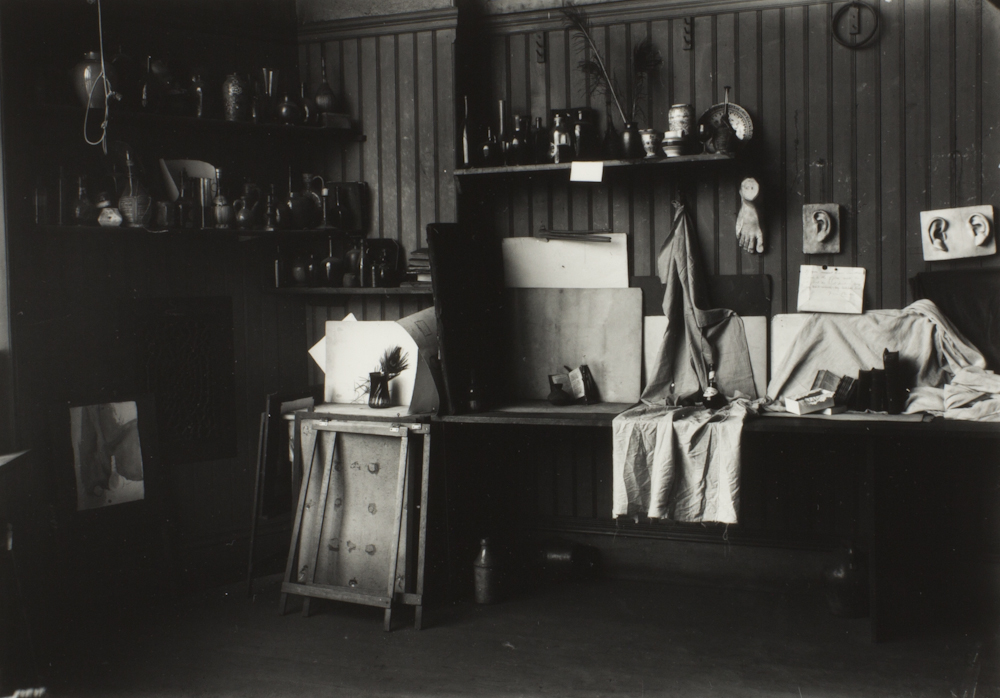
Christiansen Hoffman's studio, ca. 1890s

== External sources ==
- Mershon, Helen L. (February 11, 1995). "Crafty interiors: An exhibit shows rooms decorated in the Art and Crafts style". The Oregonian.
- OCAC grows up
- Rocchia, Andy (January 26, 1978). "Julia Hoffman made imprint on Oregon art". Oregon Journal.
