= Margery Hoffman Smith =

American painter, craftsperson, interior designer, and lecturer

- Born: Margery Elizabeth Hoffman; August 30, 1888; Portland, Oregon, U.S.
- Died: March 8, 1981 (aged 92)
- Resting place: Cypress Lawn Memorial Park, Colma, San Mateo County, California, U.S.

Margery Hoffman Smith (1888–1981) was an American painter, craftsperson, interior designer, and lecturer, known as the "grande dame of arts and crafts" for her design work at the Timberline Lodge.

== Early life and education ==
She was born August 30, 1888, in Portland, in the U.S. state of Oregon, the daughter of Lee Hoffman and Julia Christiansen Hoffman. In 1911, Hoffman earned a bachelor's degree from Bryn Mawr; she also took design coursework with Arthur B. Dow at the Art Students League of New York, and studied painting at the Portland Museum Art School.

In January 1918, she married Ferdinand C. Smith, who was in the U.S. Army at Camp Lewis. He had fallen ill with scarlet fever, and as soon as they said their vows he went into quarantine. They moved to San Francisco in the 1940s, where he later became a partner in the brokerage firm Merrill, Lynch, Pierce, Fenner, and Beane. After he died, she opened her own interior design studio in 1959.

== Timberline Lodge ==
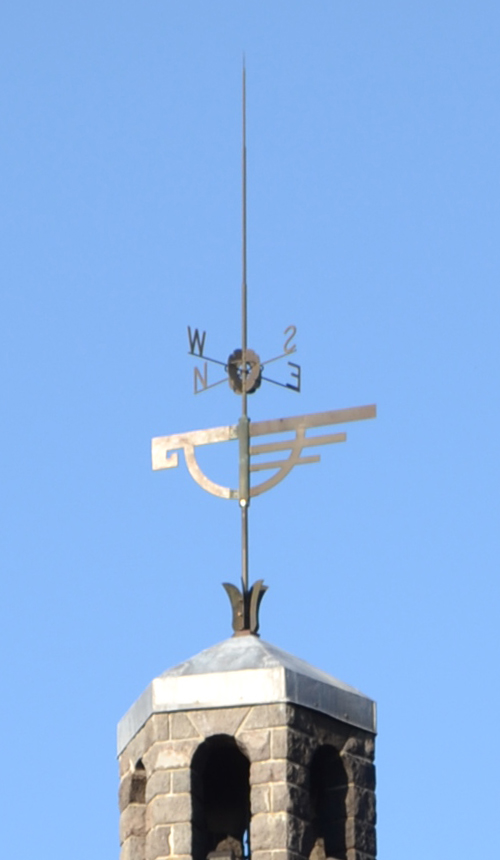
Smith's iconic bronze "snow goose" weather vane above the head house at Timberline Lodge

Oregon Arts Project administrator for the Federal Arts Project, Smith is best known for directing the art work at Timberline Lodge, a mountain lodge on the south side of Mount Hood constructed from 1936 to 1938 by the Works Progress Administration. She created many designs for textiles and rugs, and designed the iconic "snow goose", the 750-pound bronze weather vane above the head house. Smith based the abstract forms incised into the lodge chimney on the art of the local Tenino people. Likely acquainted with William Gray Purcell, a fellow resident of Portland, Smith saw that the Prairie School aesthetic was carried through in tables, chairs, sectional sofas, columns, bedspreads, draperies, lampshades and pendant lighting fixtures. She commissioned murals, paintings and carvings from Oregon's WPA artists.

== Awards ==
In 1979, Governor Vic Atiyeh awarded Hoffman the Governor's Award for the Arts.
