= Barbara Fealy =

American landscape architect

- Born: Barbara Vorse; 1903; Salt Lake City, Utah, US
- Died: December 30, 2000 (aged 96–97)
- Education: University of Illinois
- Occupation: Landscape architect

Barbara Vorse Fealy (1903 – December 30, 2000) was an American landscape architect. In 1985, Fealy was elected a fellow of the American Society of Landscape Architects, making her the first woman member in Oregon.

Her works, which centered in Portland, Oregon, and the broader Pacific Northwest, have been recognized in several ways, including several which have been listed on the National Register of Historic Places. Fealy worked on landscape design for Timberline Lodge, which was later named a National Historic Landmark.

== Biography ==
Fealy was born in Salt Lake City, Utah, in 1903 to Albert Justin Vorse, the operator of a large plant nursery, and Bettie Vorse. As a child Fealy worked with her father in the nursery. She studied landscape architecture the University of Illinois from 1921 to 1925. She was taught by scholars including Jens Jensen and Stanley Hart White.

After graduating in 1925, she took a job with her father. In either 1926 or 1928 Fealy moved to Denver, where she worked for McCrary, Culley and Carhart. She formed her own architectural firm in 1929, returning to Salt Lake City. In 1932, she was hired by the Utah State Planning Commission.

Fealy moved to Oregon in 1947 with her husband, where she worked on a number of landscape designs, including those at the Oregon College of Art and Craft and the Leach Botanical Garden. In 1985, Fealy was elected a fellow of the American Society of Landscape Architects, making her the first woman member in Oregon. She died in 2000.

== Personal life ==
In 1932, Fealy married Morris Hoag. She had at least two daughters.

== Notable works ==
Barbara Fealy was involved in landscape design for a number of locations, including:

Work	Image	Location
Catlin-Gabel School		Portland, Oregon
Eagle Crest		Redmond, Oregon
First Unitarian Church		Portland, Oregon
Leach Botanical Garden		Portland, Oregon
Oregon School of Arts and Crafts		Portland, Oregon
Sokol Blosser Winery		Newberg, Oregon
Timberline Lodge		Government Camp, Oregon
Waverly Country Club		Lake Oswego, Oregon
Western Forestry Center		Portland, Oregon
Yurigawa Park		Sapporo, Japan
