= John Storrs (architect) =

American architect

- Born: 1920; Bridgeport, Connecticut
- Died: August 31, 2003 (aged 83); Portland, Oregon
- Occupation: Architect
- Buildings: Sokol Blosser Winery; Salishan Lodge; Oregon College of Art & Craft

John W. Storrs (1920 – August 31, 2003) was an American architect in Oregon. A native of Connecticut, the World War II veteran was known for designs in the Northwest Regional style. His notable works include Salishan Lodge, the original tasting room at the Sokol Blosser Winery, and the campus of the Oregon College of Art & Craft, among others.

== Early life ==
Storrs was born in 1920 in Bridgeport, Connecticut. Growing up he joined the Boy Scouts and achieved the rank of Eagle Scout. He then attended Dartmouth College in New Hampshire where he was an all-American swimmer, and graduated in 1942. Storrs then joined the United States Navy where he was in command of a sub chaser during World War II. Following the war, he graduated from the Yale School of Architecture with a master's degree in architecture in 1949. He married Frances, and had four children.

== Career ==
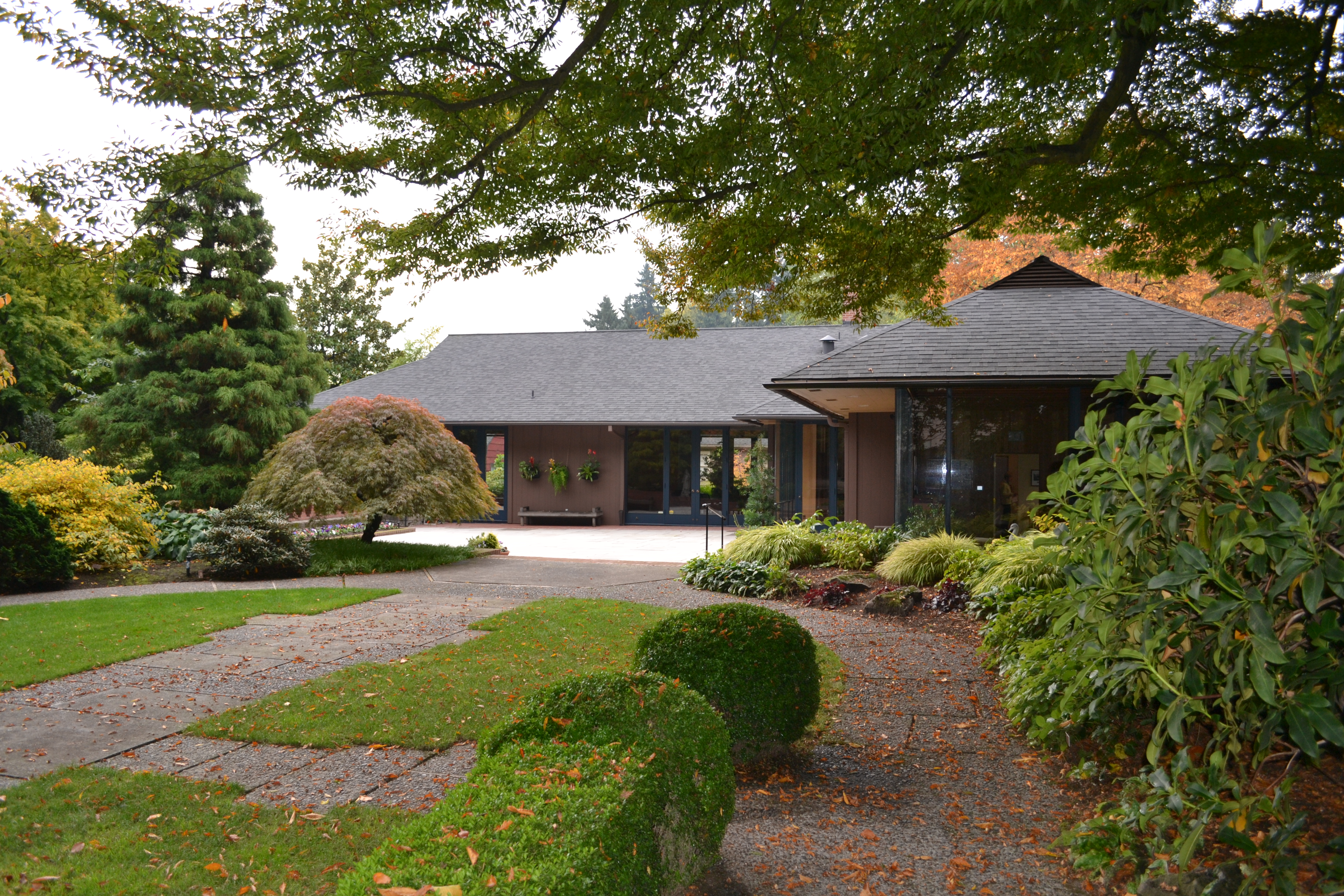
The Portland Garden Club

After hearing a lecture by Oregon architect Pietro Belluschi, Storrs moved to Portland, Oregon, in 1954 after practicing in Fairfield, Connecticut, for a few years. In Portland, he got his big break when he received the commission for the Portland Garden Club in the Goose Hollow area of Southwest in 1956. Storrs next big project came in 1959 when he designed the Lumber Industry Pavilion at the Oregon Centennial. The wood hyperbolic paraboloids were destroyed in 1962 by the Columbus Day Storm. He designed a similar one, Marineland at Pier 99, located along Interstate 5 near the Washington border. The upper level and hyperbolic paraboloid roof of Marineland at Pier 99, formerly known as the Totem Pole Marina, located at 1415 North Pier 99 Street, was demolished in July 2023.

Other projects designed by Storrs include the Oregon College of Art & Craft, Lake Oswego's Lakeridge High School, the World Forestry Center at Washington Park in Portland, St. Mary's Catholic Church in Corvallis, Central Catholic High School in Portland, the Mazama Lodge, and Congregation Ahavath Achim, among others. He also designed Sokol Blosser Winery's original tasting room in 1977, with his final project as a conversion of a closed mattress factory into the John's Landing Water Tower building with retail and office space. Storrs' most notable design is the Salishan Lodge resort at Gleneden Beach, Oregon, along the Oregon Coast.

== Later life ==
Storrs studied the culinary arts in London in the 1970s, but only prepared meals for his family and friends. He died on August 31, 2003, in Portland at the age of 83.
