= Sokol Blosser Winery =

Vineyard, tasting room and winery facility in Dayton, Oregon, U.S.

Coordinates: 45.25121°N 123.0495°W

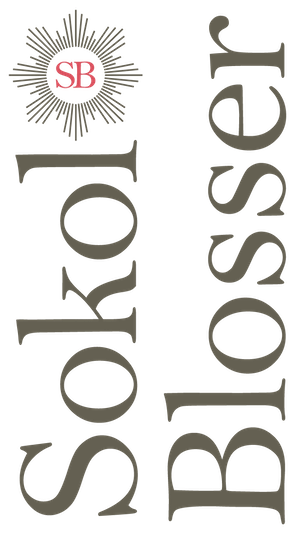
- Location: Dayton, Oregon, USA
- Appellation: Oregon
- Other labels: Evolution, Meditrina
- Founded: 1971
- First vintage: 1977
- Key people: Susan Sokol Blosser, Bill Blosser, Alison Sokol Blosser, Alex Sokol Blosser
- Cases/yr: ~65,000
- Known for: Pinot Noir, Pinot Gris, Chardonnay, Rosé
- Varietals: Pinot Noir, Pinot Gris, Riesling, Müller-Thurgau, Chardonnay
- Distribution: All 50 states and 16 countries internationally
- Website: www.sokolblosser.com

Sokol Blosser Winery is a historic vineyard, tasting room and winery facility located northeast of Dayton, Oregon in the Red Hills of Dundee in Yamhill County. It was founded by Bill Blosser and Susan Sokol Blosser in 1971 in what is now known as the Dundee Hills AVA. Sokol Blosser Winery is family owned and operated by second-generation President Alex Sokol Blosser, and is the 6th largest wine producer in Oregon. Sokol Blosser is considered to be “synonymous with sustainability,” and produces Pinot Noir, Pinot Gris, Chardonnay, Sauvignon Blanc, Müller-Thurgau, Pinot Blanc, and proprietary blends Evolution White, Red, Pinot Noir, Sauvignon Blanc and Riesling and a range of other Evolution wines, and small quantities of single block Pinot Noirs, Rosé of Pinot Noir, White Riesling dessert wine, and sparkling wine. In 2023 the Winery introduced red and white Aperitif Wines, produced from a blend of alcohol distilled from their grapes and a blend of herbs.

== History ==
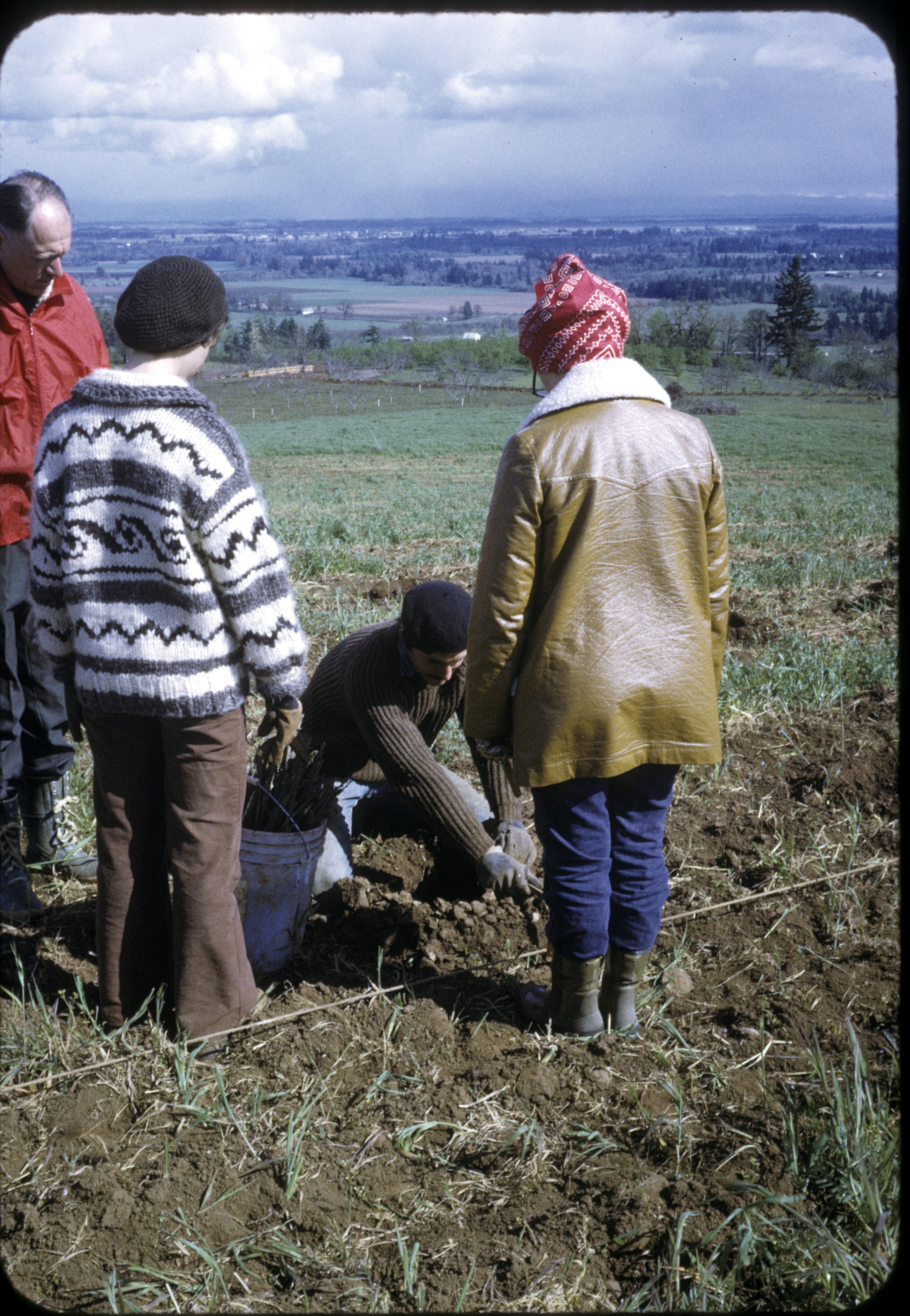
Bill Blosser demonstrates how to plant vines - 1972

As one of the pioneering wineries of Oregon, Sokol Blosser Winery has played a key role in developing and shaping the now prominent Oregon wine industry. The first Pinot Noir vines were planted on a 5-acre plot on a former prune orchard in 1971, and the first vintage was produced in 1977. In 1978, they built the first tasting room in Oregon, designed by noted Oregon architect John Storrs.

In 2006, founder Susan Sokol Blosser wrote At Home in the Vineyard: Cultivating a Winery, an Industry, and a Life, a memoir published by University of California Press about the experience of founding the winery. An expanded and revised edition was published in 2017 as The Vineyard Years: A Memoir with Recipes by West Margin Press.

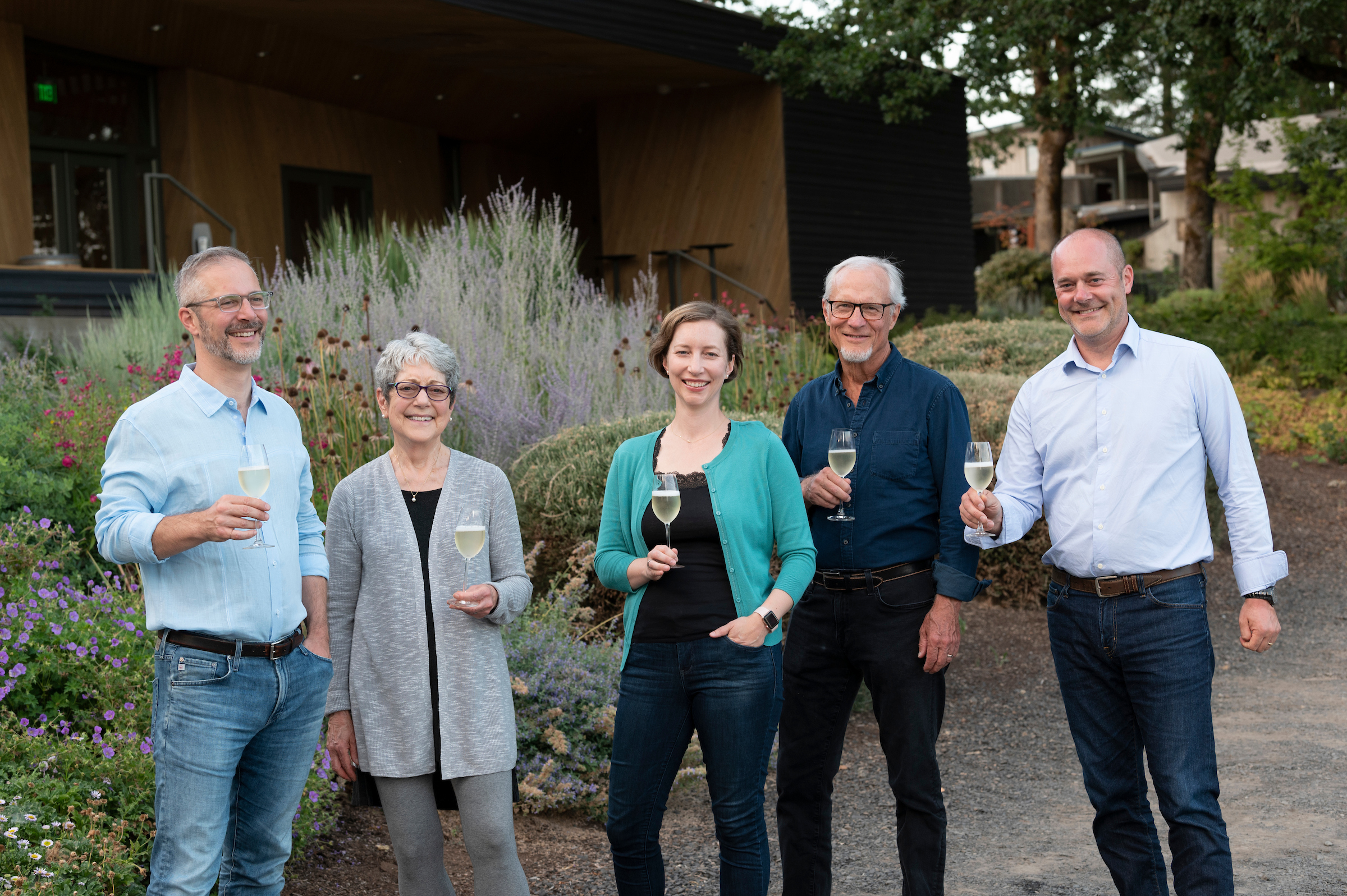
The first and second generation Sokol Blossers. (Nik, Susan, Alison, Bill, and Alex)

The winery opened a new tasting room in 2013, designed by architect Brad Cloepfil of Allied Works Architecture. The Tasting Room received the American Institute of Architects - Northwest and Pacific Region 2013 Design Award and has been written about in numerous architectural publications.

Adjacent vineyard land was purchased in the following years, bringing the estate total to 89 acres. They also lease land in the Eola Hills and in 2021 bought a 65-acre parcel in the Yamhill-Carlton AVA called Kalita Vineyard.

=== Second generation transition ===
When the Blossers started the vineyards and winery, they had no idea if any of their three children (Nik, Alex, Alison) would be interested in taking over. Alex was the first one to show an interest and studied viticulture in college and worked as a vineyard foreman for another producer. Then, after a stint as a wine salesman, he came full-time to the winery in 1998 to help manage the vineyards and lead sales. While working, he got his MBA at Portland State University and certification from the University of California at Davis in winemaking. Meanwhile, Alison completed college, got an MBA and worked for several startups. Then, she too felt the lure of the winery and came to work in sales and marketing in 2004. After a year of slowly taking over operations, Susan completed the transition from her 25-year management of the company to Alex and Alison as co-presidents in 2008. In 2013 Alex took over as winemaker from Russ Rosner, who retired after 15 years as winemaker. Alex transferred winemaking duties in 2023 to Robin Howell when he took over as President and Alison retired from her Co-President position.

Bill and Susan continue active involvement in the winery, serving on the board of directors and helping out during crush and public events. Nik has also been very involved in the board of directors and major decision making over the years. He also led the creation of an aperitif wine which debuted in 2023.

Nik, Alex and Alison have created a plan to familiarize the third generation (Alexander, Jacob, Avery, Nikolas, Anna, Dario, Luca and Isabelle) with the winery and vineyards, and to enable them to work during the summers and harvest. They have created an internship program for those who graduate from college, if they want further involvement in the winery.

== Sustainability ==
Sokol Blosser Winery has been Certified Organic by the Oregon Department of Agriculture since 2005. In 1996, Sokol Blosser's vineyards were the first to be certified Salmon-Safe, a program launched by the Pacific Rivers Council to publicize products produced without using pesticides and causing runoff that would harm salmon. Sokol Blosser's underground barrel cellar became the first US winery to receive LEED (Leadership in Energy and Environmental Design) Certification for an industrial building. At the north end of a main Pinot noir vineyard block is a 24 kW photovoltaic solar panel array, which was installed in 2006 and provides approximately 25% of the Winery's energy needs.

In 2007, Sunset magazine honored both founder Susan Sokol Blosser and Sokol Blosser Winery with their prestigious "Green Winery of the Year" award. Also in 2007, Sokol Blosser Winery was recognized by the City of Portland, Oregon’s Office of Sustainable Development for its commitment to green practices with the “BEST (Businesses for an Environmentally Sustainable Tomorrow) Practices for Sustainability—Small Company” award. In 2008, Sokol Blosser Winery was recognized by Oregon Secretary of State Bill Bradbury with a prestigious Oregon Sustainability Award, honoring the winery as an organization that had taken dramatic and comprehensive steps to incorporate sustainability into operations. TreeHugger awarded Sokol Blosser Winery with their Best Green Winery award in their inaugural Best of Green Awards in 2009. The Winery was certified in 2015 as a Certified B Corporation, testifying to its commitment to people, planet and profit. B Corporation awarded the Winery for the third time its Best in the World Environment award in 2021.

Sokol Blosser Winery is a participant in the Carbon Reduction Challenge, an initiative begun by Oregon Governor Ted Kulongoski in 2009 as the Carbon Neutral Challenge, with the goal of inspiring businesses to measure and progressively reduce greenhouse gases. The Winery has been ranked multiple times as one of Oregon Business magazine's Top 100 Best Green Companies to Work For.

The Winery publishes a Sustainability Report annually (available on its website).

== Vineyards ==
=== Red Hills of Dundee ===
The Winery's 89 acres of estate vineyards are all USDA certified organic and comprise 14 southeast- and southwest-facing parcels spread over the slopes of the hills. The soils are Jory clay loam in the vineyards lying between approximately 500 and 800 feet elevation, which varies in depth from approximately 1 to 6 feet, and Willakenzie silty clay loam, which varies from about 6 to 10 feet depth and lies between about 200 and 500 feet in elevation.

Pinot Noir is the predominant grape planted and includes the Wadenswil, Pommard, Pinot Droit and the Dijon clones 777, 677, and 115. In addition, there are smaller plantings of Chardonnay, Pinot Gris, White Riesling and Müller-Thurgau. The vineyards were originally planted on their own roots because there was thought to be no phylloxera in Oregon. But, by the 1990s it became evident that phylloxera was slowly invading the vineyards and they were slowly replanted on rootstocks, using cuttings from the original vines.

Depending on the vintage, the Winery produces single-vineyard wines from selected barrels in some blocks, including Goosepen, Old Vineyard, Big Tree, Peach Tree, Twelve Row, Blackberry, Watershed and Orchard.

=== Eola-Amity Hills AVA ===
The Winery leases and farms organically a 20+ acre vineyard called Blossom Ridge in the Eola-Amity Hills AVA. This site is more exposed to the cool westerly winds from the ocean and therefore the grapes ripen later than in the Dundee Hills. This vineyard on Jory soils is planted entirely to Pinot Noir, although the Winery intends to plant Chardonnay in 2022. The grapes from the vineyard are used principally for the Rosé of Pinot Noir and sparkling wines.

=== Yamhill-Carlton AVA ===
In 2021 the Winery purchased the 65-acre Kalita Vineyard (only 23 acres are plantable). The vineyard was about 12 years old and is planted almost entirely to Pinot Noir, with an additional 3 acres of Pinot Meunier in 2024. The soils are Goodin, which is a silty clay loam derived from marine deposits ranging up to about 5 feet deep. The vineyards lie between about 500 and 700 feet elevation with a southerly exposure. This is the first vineyard with non-volcanic soils owned by the Winery and will produce wines distinctly different from the Dundee and Eola-Amity Hills. The overall degree days on this site are similar to the Dundee Hills. The vineyard will be converted to organic farming beginning in 2022.

== Winery ==
The construction of the main winery building began in 1976 and the first crush was in 1977. A warehouse was added in 1979. In 2002 the Winery constructed an adjacent underground barrel cellar that was the first winery building to receive the U.S. Green Building Council's LEED (Leadership in Energy and Environmental Design) certification as a green building. A storage and shipping fulfillment warehouse was constructed in 2022.

The winery processes approximately 1000 tons per year from its own vineyards and grapes purchased from other growers. The winemaking philosophy emphasizes minimum intervention. The Pinot Noirs destined for single-vineyard designations are gently destemmed and whole-berry fermented in open-top 2.5 ton fermenters using wild yeasts. These Pinot Noirs are barrel-aged in French oak for 14–16 months before bottling.

== Production and distribution ==
The Winery sells approximately 65,000 cases per year in 50 states and 16 countries. In addition to premium wines sold under the Sokol Blosser label, the winery also produces a line of wines under the Evolution label.

Sokol Blosser wines: Pinot Noir, Chardonnay, White Riesling, Sauvignon Blanc, Pinot Gris, Pinot Blanc, Müller-Thurgau, Pinot Noir Rosé and three sparkling wines (Bluebird Cuvée, Blanc de Blanc, and Rosé of Pinot Noir).

Evolution wines: Pinot Noir, Chardonnay, Lucky No. 9 White (a blend of 9 grapes), Big Time Red, and Riesling.
