= Chris E. Vargas =

American artist and video maker

- Education: University of California Santa Cruz and University of California, Berkeley
- Awards: Creative Capital Grant
- Website: www.chrisevargas.com

Chris E. Vargas is an artist and video maker whose work explores the ways that queer and trans people negotiate institutions and popular culture. Vargas is the founder of the Museum of Transgender Hirstory and Art (MOTHA), a project that blurs artist and curatorial practice. MOTHA has no permanent space, instead it has been presented at venues such as the Henry Art Gallery, Cooper Union, ONE National Gay & Lesbian Archives, Yerba Buena Center for the Arts, and the Hammer Museum. Vargas videos have screened at SFMOMA, Ann Arbor Film Festival, Pacific Film Archives, Boston Museum of Fine Arts, MIX NYC, Palais de Tokyo, Outfest, amongst other venues. Vargas completed a BA at University of California Santa Cruz and MFA at University of California, Berkeley.

== Work ==
Vargas video work explores queer and trans culture. He and Greg Youmans collaborated on the nine episode webseries "Falling in Love... with Chris and Greg" that explores a relationship between a cisgendered gay man (Greg) and his trans boyfriend (Chris). The sitcom-style videos cover the challenges and rewards of the life of this couple.

Vargas was among those who created a miniature replica of Christopher Park and placed monuments to narrate the events of the Stonewall Riots that followed the police raid of the Stonewall Inn gay bar in 1969 New York. Christopher Park became a site of riots since it was close to the Stonewall Inn bar that got raided and Vargas states the recreation of that park includes monuments that memorialize the modern LGBTQ rights movement.

== Museum of Transgender Hirstory and Art ==
The Museum of Transgender Hirstory and Art (abbreviated as MOTHA), is a museum founded by Vargas in 2013 dedicated to the preservation and representation of transgender and gender non-conforming history and art. Vargas remains the executive director. The museum does not have a building of its own, or fixed location; MOTHA functions as a floating museum, hosting exhibitions in art galleries, museums, and public spaces across the United States. Greg Youmans, in Elsa Gidlow's garden describes the museum as blurring the line between artistic and curatorial practice.

Without a consistent stationary space for his art exhibition, Vargas points out that there is not as much of a need to define borders and boundaries for trends and trans identification. He notes, "Without a physical space, and by doing it as occasional iterations, exhibitions, events, or performances, I get to be a little looser."

== History ==
The museum was created in 2013 by founder and Executive Director Chris E. Vargas. Vargas is a San Francisco-based artist and performer. MOTHA functions as a floating museum, hosting exhibitions in art galleries, museums, and public spaces across the United States.

== Exhibitions ==
Trans Hirstory in 99 Objects is a project that takes inspiration from Smithsonian's History of America in 101 Objects. It and focuses on trans experiences in the Pacific north-west and juxtaposes archival materials and contemporary art.

- Trans Hirstory in 99 Objects, August 13, 2016 – June 4, 2017 at The Henry Art Gallery, Seattle, WA
- Transgender Hirstory in 99 Objects: Legends and Mythologies, March 21 – July 11, 2015 at the ONE Archives, Los Angeles, CA

== Resident artist program ==
The museum has an amorphous residency program that offers no physical structure and makes no demands of the resident artist. Tuesday Smillie was the inaugural resident artist.

=== Exhibitions ===
Trans Hirstory in 99 Objects is a project that takes inspiration from Smithsonian's History of America in 101 Objects. It focuses on trans experiences in the Pacific north-west and juxtaposes archival materials and contemporary art.

- Trans Hirstory in 99 Objects, August 13, 2016 – June 4, 2017 at The Henry Art Gallery, Seattle, WA
- Transgender Hirstory in 99 Objects: Legends and Mythologies, March 21 – July 11, 2015 at the ONE Archives, Los Angeles, CA

=== Resident artist program ===
The museum has an amorphous residency program that offers no physical structure and makes no demands of the resident artist. Tuesday Smillie was the inaugural resident artist.

== Residencies and awards ==
Vargas received a 2016 Creative Capital Grant in Emerging Fields, was a Community Engagement Artist in Residence at Yerba Buena Center for the Arts, and received a Fire Island Artist Residency. Vargas' videos have won prizes at the Ann Arbor Film Festival.

In 2025, Vargas was awarded a Guggenheim Fellowship.
