= Christine Ross (art historian) =

Canadian scholar

- Citizenship: Canadian
- Scientific career
- Fields: Art history
- Institutions: McGill University

Christine Ross is a Canadian scholar specializing on contemporary media arts, in particular: the relationship between media, aesthetics and subjectivity; visuality; spectatorship and interactivity studies; augmented reality; and reconfigurations of time and temporality in recent media arts.

Professor Ross has been the Director of Media@McGill a research hub on issues of media, technology and culture at McGill University.

Dr. Christine Ross was awarded the Queen Elizabeth II Diamond Jubilee Medal and the Artexte Research prize in contemporary art in 2013.

== Bibliography ==
The following is a selection of works written or edited by Christine Ross:

- The Past is the Present; It's the Future Too The Temporal Turn in Contemporary Art. New York: Bloomsbury Academic, 2012.
- The Aesthetics of Disengagement: Contemporary Art and Depression. Minneapolis: University of Minnesota Press, 2006.
- Images de surface: l'art vidéo reconsidéré. Montréal: Éditions Artextes, 1996.
