= Campus of the University of Oregon =

College campus in Eugene, Oregon, US

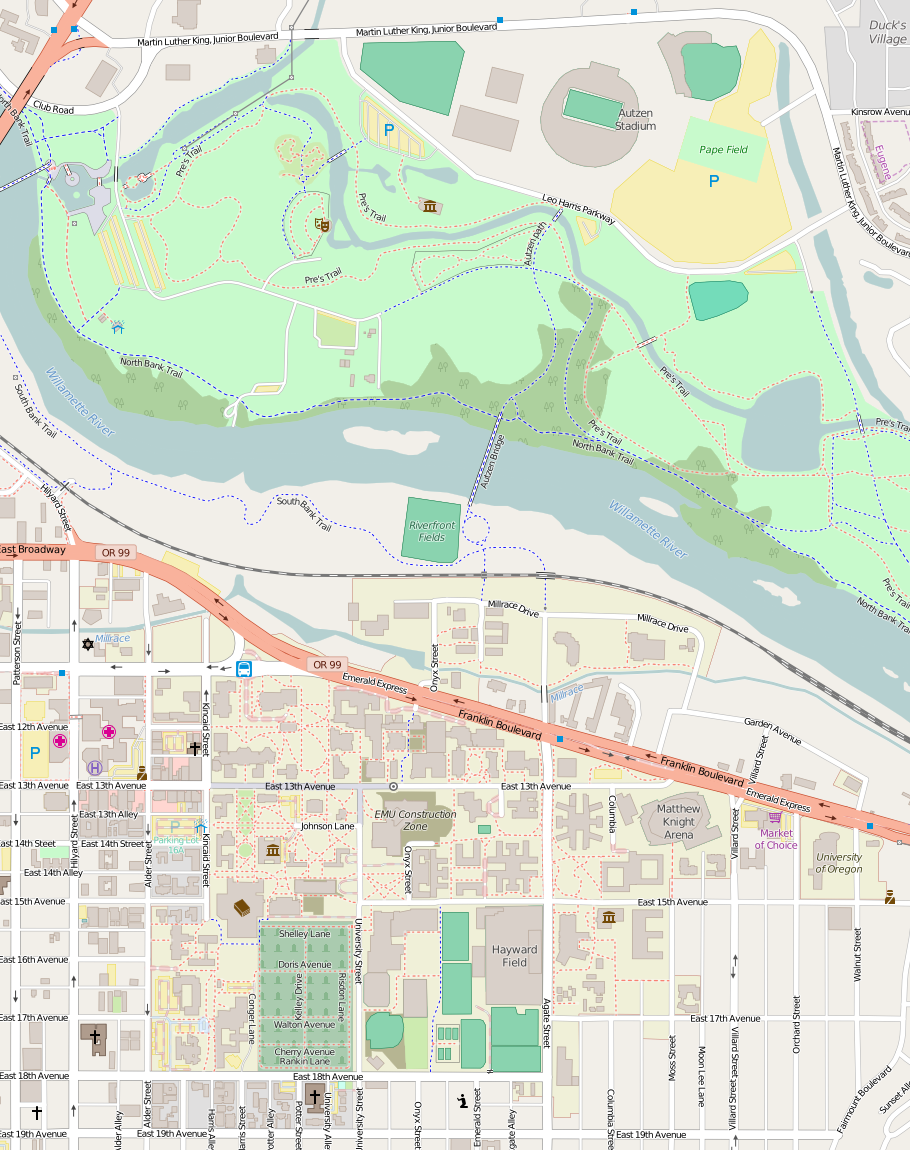
Map of the campus

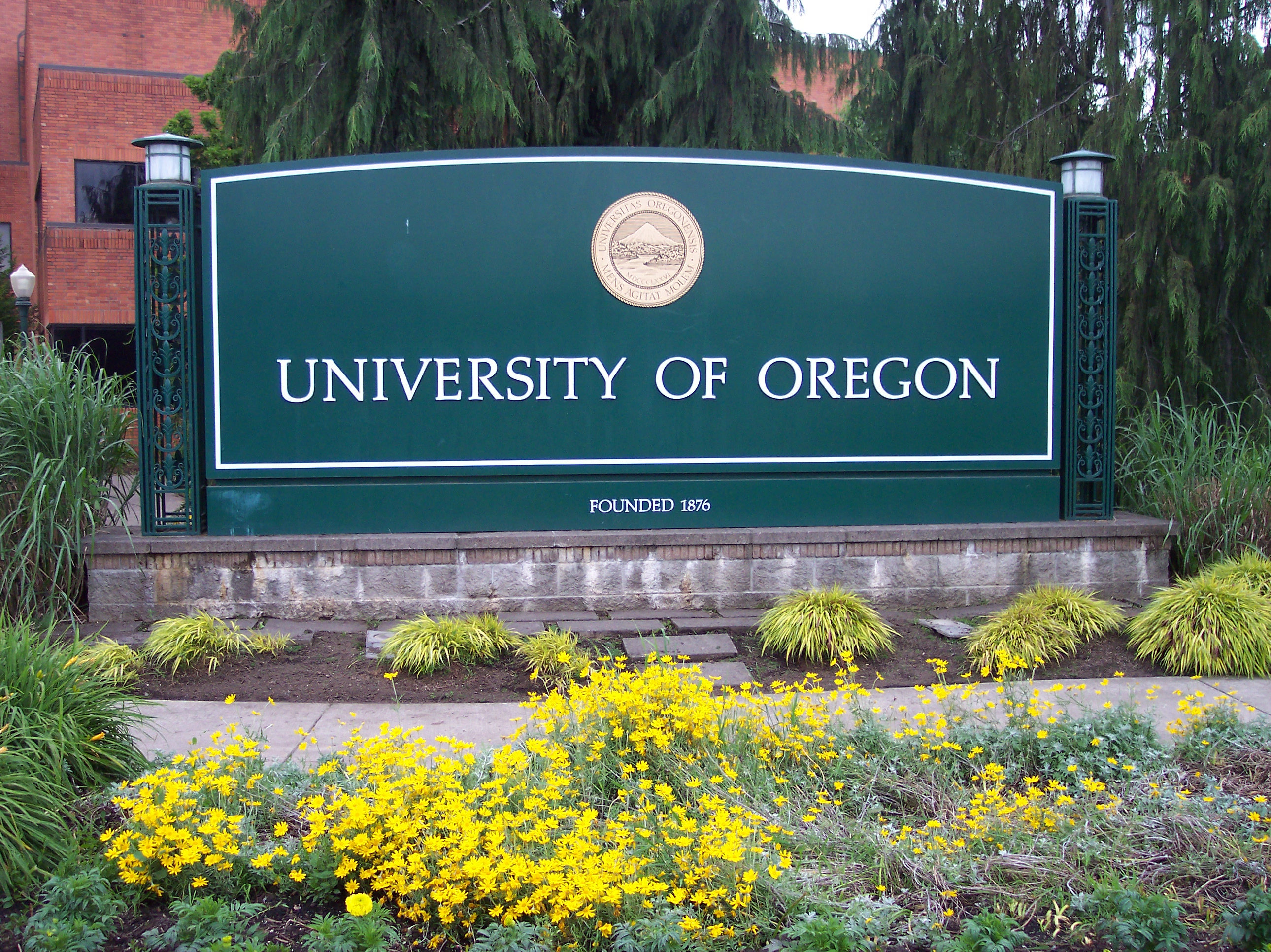
Main sign at the Agate Street entrance to the University

The campus of the University of Oregon is located in Eugene, Oregon, and includes some 80 buildings and facilities, including athletics facilities such as Hayward Field, which has been the site of the Olympic Track and Field Trials since 2008, the Matthew Knight Arena, and off-campus sites such as nearby Autzen Stadium and the Riverfront Research Park. An online guide published by the University of Oregon Libraries, Architecture of the University of Oregon, describes campus buildings and provides timelines of key architectural events linked with campus history.

== History ==
=== Inception Era (1876–1913) ===
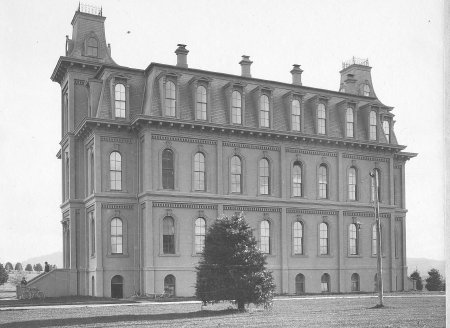
A view of Deady Hall soon after construction. Image courtesy of the Oregon State Library.

The campus opened in Eugene on October 16, 1876, in an 18-acre former wheat field purchased from Reverend J. H. D. Henderson. Henderson's land had been part of Hilyard Shaw's original donation land claim. Work on the first campus building, named Deady Hall in 1893, would not yet be completed until 1877, and school began on the building's first floor with hammering noise and other carpenter sounds coming from the floors above. Judge Joshua J. Walton, organizer of the Union University Association, the organization responsible for bringing the university to Eugene, kept his cattle on the property even after classes began. Judge Walton later erected a fence to separate his cattle from the students. The campus had no sidewalks, only two oak trees, and a great quantity of mud.

Financial difficulties had dogged the university since before opening day, and in 1881 the Oregon Supreme Court ruled that the campus could be sold to pay the debts of the university. The court also found that the conveyance of campus property from the Union University Association to the university's board of directors in 1873 and then to the Board of Regents in 1876 was made with intent to defraud the university's creditors. Henry Villard, president of the Northern Pacific Railway, averted the sale of the campus by paying many of the debts himself, and he later established a $50,000 endowment. The university's second building, Villard Hall, was constructed in 1886 and named in honor of the first benefactor.

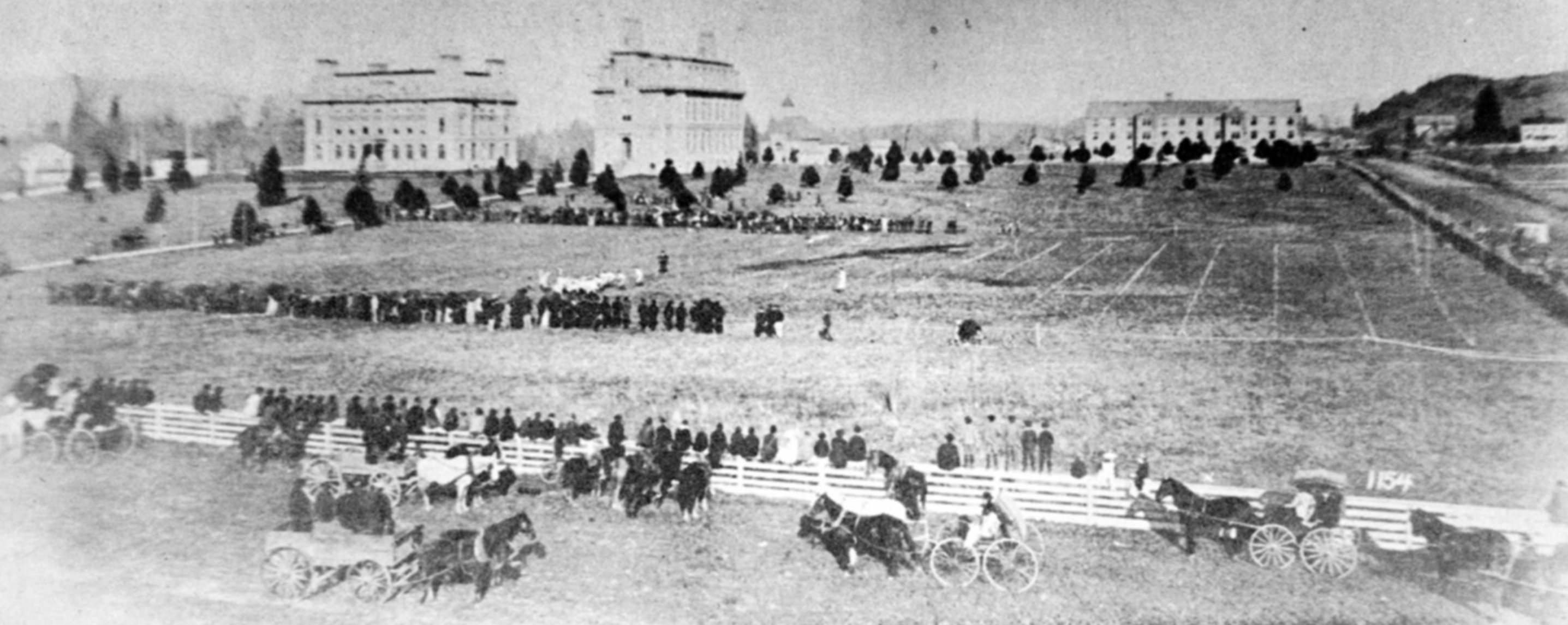
Some old-campus buildings are visible in this view of the first American football game played at the University of Oregon on March 24, 1894. Villard Hall and Deady Hall are in the upper left, and the gymnasium is in the distance behind Deady Hall. Friendly Hall and Collier House are in the upper right. The football field is roughly on the site of the modern Lillis Business Complex and the Computing Center. Kincaid Street is in the foreground, and the lines of 13th Avenue are along the right. Image courtesy of the Oregon Daily Emerald.

Other surviving buildings from the inception era, sometimes called the old-campus era, include a dormitory and a library. Constructed in 1893 and named in 1915 for Sampson H. Friendly, an early donor and founding member of the Board of Regents, Friendly Hall began as a dormitory but was converted into classrooms in 1928. Although the university library had been housed in various locations, a library building was constructed in 1906 and named in 1938 for a donor, Judge William D. Fenton, shortly after being remodeled to house the law school.

Buildings in the area of the old campus were arranged around the Old Campus Quadrangle, an informal space with natural vegetation and sidewalks located along the approximate lines of earlier boardwalks.

The university purchased Collier House from physics professor George Collier in 1896. The house had been constructed in 1886, shortly before Villard Hall, and became the second oldest building on campus. The purchase of Collier House included a barn that was converted to classroom space and used as an observatory. Additionally, the house came with 9.5 acres of land which enabled the campus to expand south of 13th Avenue. A brief description of Collier and his property, including mention of other members of the historic university community, was prepared by Friends of the Eugene Masonic Cemetery.

Preservation has not always been a policy on campus, and sometimes the needs of expansion have caused destruction. Former buildings in the old campus area include McClure Hall, the Gymnasium, and Mechanical Hall, although Mechanical Hall has been partly preserved as a corner of Lawrence Hall.

The old-campus era ended in the second decade of the 20th century when it became evident that the university needed a campus planner.

=== Lawrence/Cuthbert Era (1914–1946) ===
Ellis F. Lawrence joined the university in 1914 as the campus planner, and in that year he prepared the first campus master plan. The plan was based on a formal design of buildings around a quadrangle. Where the Old Campus Quadrangle had been a casual collection of buildings designed by several architects, Lawrence quadrangles were open spaces with elements of formal gardens. And notably, Lawrence would design the buildings as agreed in his contract with the university. In 1915 he became the university's architect, and he founded the architecture school. Between 1916 and 1937, Lawrence designed and built 25 buildings at the university. Lawrence arrived during a time of Gothic Revival architecture on some college campuses. It was fashionable to design campus buildings in the style of the University of Oxford, making them seem historic. Historian John Thelin observed, "The newer the campus was, the older it appeared to be."

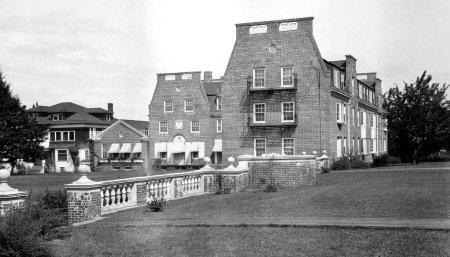
A view of Hendricks Hall in the Women's Memorial Quadrangle. To the left is the Mary Spiller House, a dormitory that was destroyed in 1951 to open that area of campus to formal landscaping. Image courtesy of the Oregon State Library.

But Lawrence resisted the copy-Oxford fashion, and he designed in a variety of other styles, often influenced by his Beaux-Arts training. And he combined styles with ease. The style of the campus library, later named the Knight Library, was listed as "Beaux Arts Eclecticism" on its NRHP nomination form.

A quote from the NRHP nomination form prepared for the art museum, later named the Jordan Schnitzer Museum of Art, indicates that the structure combined many styles and was difficult to classify:

Stylistically, the museum is somewhat of an enigma. Contemporary reports called it Romanesque. A 1974 survey referred to it as Modernistic. Professor Marion Ross of the Art History department of the University of Oregon discussed its relationship to Romanesque, Gothic, Islamic, and Modernistic architecture and to Victorian eclecticism of taste. He concluded it was Eclectic modified with North Italian Romanesque.

Two of Lawrence's quadrangles, the Memorial Quadrangle and the Women's Memorial Quadrangle, are listed on the NRHP along with buildings as contributing resources.

Frederick A. Cuthbert joined the university in 1932 as the landscape architect. Later he would head the landscape architecture department. In 1940, Cuthbert designed formal entrance gates to the university, including a motorway that would lead visitors past the old campus area to the new Memorial Quadrangle. Although the motorway was not constructed, the Dad's Gates were completed and have NRHP site designation. Cuthbert is credited with the X and O patterns in the Memorial Quadrangle.

More than any other planners, Lawrence and Cuthbert defined the campus of the University of Oregon. A recent survey of 21 landscapes found that 14 were significantly influenced by the Lawrence/Cuthbert era. Visitors to campus sometimes remark that the era is characterized by beautiful outdoor spaces and architectural harmony.

=== Mid-century Era (1947–1974) ===
After World War II, enrollment at the university dramatically increased, partly because of a federal education subsidy known as the G.I. Bill, and the mid-century era is partly characterized by dormitory construction. Where the previous era had relied upon the design skills of a single architect trained in the Beaux-Arts style, the new era awarded contracts to many architects. A predominant style, however, was European Modernism with its simple forms and absence of decoration. Landscaping became more complex in the decentralized planning process.

The campus added new science buildings during this era to keep up with demand for increasingly technical degree programs, and with increased attendance at football games, Autzen Stadium opened in 1967, shifting the football program away from Hayward Field and off campus.

== The Oregon Experiment ==
The university is known for being the site of a pioneering participatory planning experiment known as the Oregon Experiment (which is also the subject of a book of the same name). The two major principles of the project are that buildings should be designed, in part, by the people who will ultimately use them (usually with the help of an 'architect facilitator'), and that construction should occur over many small projects (as opposed to a few large ones).

== List of Buildings ==
The list of buildings divides the campus into regions and identifies most structures of interest on and off campus. Buildings that have been removed and single-family residential structures are not included. Whenever possible, a discussion of proper names and the year of construction are listed.

== Atlas of Trees ==
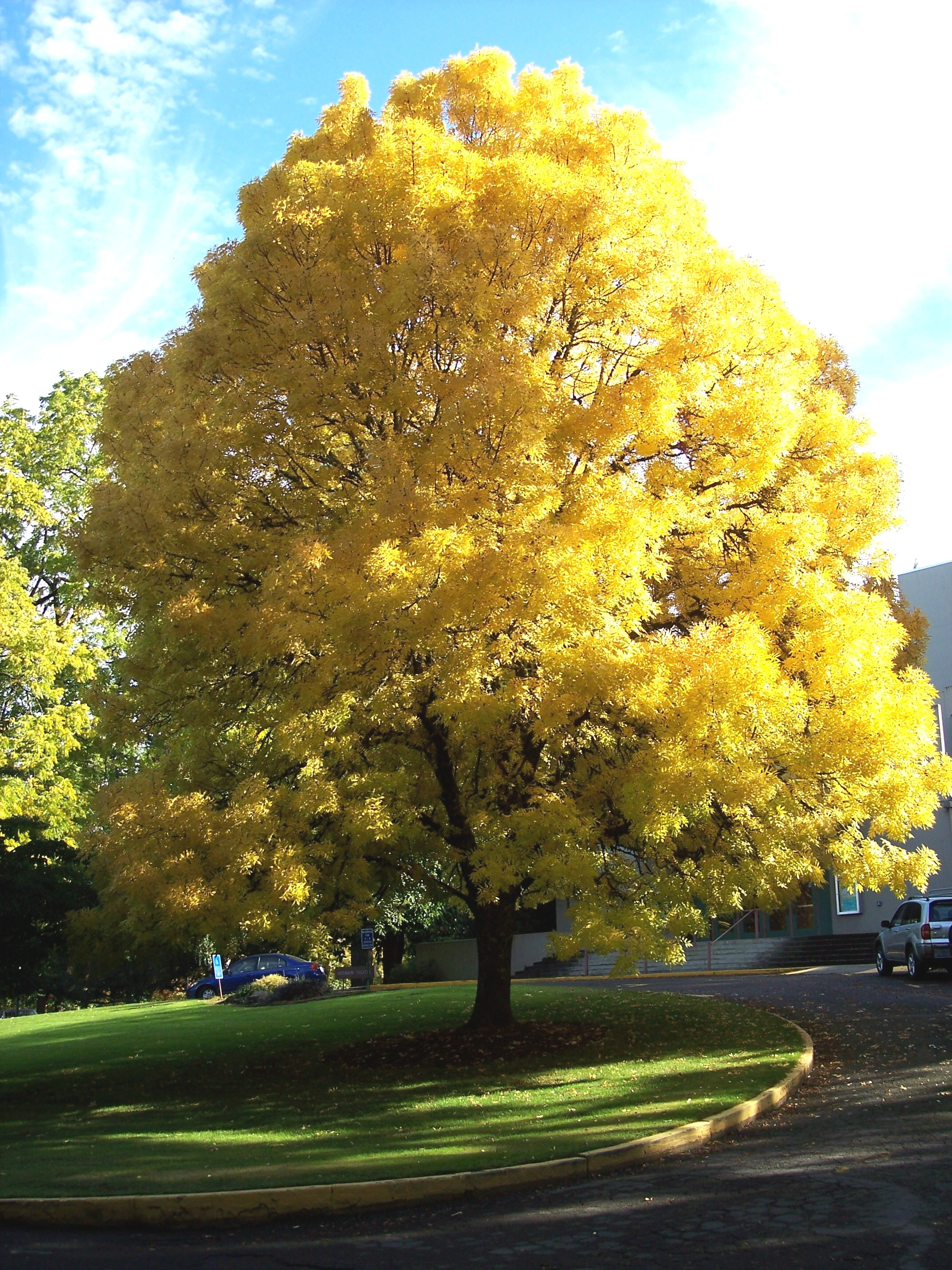
A European yellow ash, Fraxinus excelsior aurea, listed in Knapp as 56F3 and in the Atlas as FREXA. The tree was lost to expansion when construction began on the Miller Theatre Complex.

The university community has a longstanding interest in campus trees. A "Biological Map of the University of Oregon Campus" was prepared in 1913. The map placed each tree in proximity to buildings and streets in the area of the old campus.

In 1975 a former landscape architecture student, Kenneth W. Knapp, published an inventory of trees on campus. The work featured a numerical, abbreviated coding system offered by George Carroll, a professor of biology, that included the family, genus, and species of each tree on campus. The work also identified each tree on an indexed set of 53 campus maps provided by the Physical Plant, a forerunner of Campus Operations. Carroll suggested that 59 families of trees could exist in the campus climate, and Knapp identified trees from a subset of 40 families already growing on campus. Knapp's research was important for two reasons. The placement and nurture of campus trees had already become central to the emerging pattern language of campus planning, a critical part of the Oregon Experiment. But Knapp's work also developed an early framework for more extensive uses.

In the 1990s, campus planners developed a new inventory of trees. They adopted an alphabetical coding system practiced by the International Association for Plant Taxonomy. They also created a database to include all available information about individual trees. They found 71 families of trees, 537 species, and 3908 individual specimens located across 117 campus maps. Parts of the database were published as the University of Oregon Atlas of Trees in 1996. The work was digitized from a second edition published in 2006 and is available online.

== Public Art ==
- Akbar's Garden
- The Lady
- Prometheus, an abstract sculpture on the northwest of the Art museum
- Path / Weg II, 2009 by Susi Rosenberg

== Chronology ==
The following is a list of important dates and events leading to the creation of the buildings present on the University campus today.

=== 19th century ===
- 1873 - Construction begins on Deady Hall, the first building on the University of Oregon campus.
- 1876 - Deady Hall opens as the State University Building
- 1886 - Collier House is completed at the corner of 13th and University Streets, as the personal residence of Physics professor George Collier.
- 1886 - Villard Hall opens as the second building on campus.
- 1893 - Friendly Hall, the first dormitory, is completed near Collier House.
- 1896 - Collier House purchased by the University from George Collier's estate.

=== 1900 to 1909 ===
- 1901 - Mechanical Hall is completed (now incorporated into the modern Lawrence Hall).
- 1906 - Fenton Hall opens as the Library.

=== 1910s ===
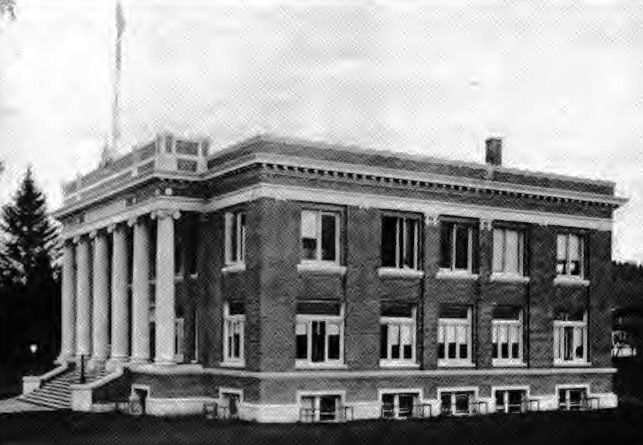
Administration Building circa 1920

- 1914 - Architecture Building opens, facing Franklin Boulevard. The building was renovated and now forms part of Lawrence Hall.
- 1914 - Addition to Fenton Hall provides stacks for the library.
- 1915 - Johnson Hall is opened as the Administration Building.
- 1916 - Peterson Hall is completed, called the Education Building.
- 1917- Construction begins on the Drill Hall, attached to the Men's Gymnasium.
- 1918 - The women's dormitory, Hendricks Hall, opens on University Street.
- 1919 - The east grandstand is built at Hayward Field.

=== 1920s ===
The firm Lawrence & Holford designed all University buildings in the 1920s.

- 1920 - The Class of 1920 Fountain was dedicated.
- 1921 - Gerlinger Hall opens as Woman's Memorial Hall.
- 1921 - The Education Building is completed, along with the adjoining University High School.
- 1921 - Commerce Hall (now Gilbert Hall) opens directly facing Peterson Hall.
- 1921 - Susan Campbell Hall is completed, and together with Gerlinger and Hendricks Halls forms Women's Memorial Quadrangle.
- 1923 - Journalism Building opens near the modern Allen Hall (later incorporated into the Journalism School when Allen Hall was built).
- 1923 - Architecture and Allied Arts Building completed (would later form much of Lawrence Hall).
- 1924 - The School of Music is completed near 18th Street.
- 1924 - The Power Plant and University Depot are built along Franklin Boulevard (the plant is now part of Lawrence Hall).
- 1925 - Condon Hall is completed on the corner of 13th and Kincaid Streets.
- 1925 - The West Grandstand is constructed at Hayward Field.
- 1926 - McArthur Court is erected.
- 1928 - John Straub Memorial Building (Men's Dormitory) is completed, now called Straub Hall.

=== 1930s ===
- 1932 - Museum of Art opens after lying empty for two years.
- 1936 - Fenton Hall is again renovated, this time to expand it for use as the Law School.
- 1936 - Construction ends on the new Physical Education Building, now called Esslinger Hall.
- 1937 - The Library, now called Knight Library, is completed near 15th and Kincaid Streets.
- 1939 - Chapman Hall is completed to mirror Condon Hall, along 13th Street.

=== 1940s ===
- 1948 - Central Power Plant is built north of Franklin Boulevard along the Willamette River.
- 1949 - Carson Hall is completed to house women students.
- 1949 - University Theater (now called Robinson Theater) is added to Villard Hall.

=== 1950s ===
- 1950 - Addition to Knight Library completed.
- 1950 - Erb Memorial Union opens at 13th and University.
- 1952 - Science Building (now Pacific Hall) opens.
- 1954 - Allen Hall opens.
- 1955 - Virgil D. Earl Hall (now Earl Complex) opens to house University students.
- 1957 - Additions to the Architecture and Allied Arts Building are completed; building is renamed Lawrence Hall in honor of the late architect.
- 1958 - First units of Walton Hall (later Walton Complex) are completed near Agate Street.
- 1959 - Five units are added to Walton.
- 1959 - Leighton Pool opens at 13th and University, where Columbia Hall stands today.

=== 1960s ===
- 1960 - Geology Building (now Columbia Hall) opens.
- 1961 - Onyx Bridge is completed, spanning part of Onyx Street.
- 1962 - Hamilton Complex is opened as a student dormitory.
- 1963 - Westmoreland Housing (off campus) is completed. The complex was sold by the University in 2006.
- 1964 - Bean Complex opens near Hamilton.
- 1964 - Prince Lucien Campbell Hall (nicknamed PLC) opens near Knight Library, and becomes the tallest building on campus.
- 1966 - College Inn opens (later acquired by the University and renamed Barnhart Hall.
- 1966 - Addition to Knight Library adds 100,000 square feet (9,300 m^{2}) to the original building.
- 1966 - Student Health Center opens.
- 1967 - Autzen Stadium opens across the Willamette River.
- 1967 - Computing Center is completed.
- 1967 - Klamath Hall is opened as Science II.
- 1969 - Clinical Services Building opens near the Music School.
- 1969 - Gerlinger Annex is built.

=== 1970s ===
- 1970 - Law Center is completed (now McKenzie Hall).
- 1973 - Huestis Hall is dedicated as Science III.
- 1974 - Oregon Hall is built to house the University registrar and other administrative offices.

=== 1980s ===
- 1980 - South Building is added to the Education Building, and renovations are made to the EMU Fishbowl.
- 1984 - Agate Hall is acquired by the University.
- 1986 - Millrace I and II are completed for the School of Architecture and Allied Arts.
- 1986 - Chiles Business Center opens (now part of the Lillis Business Complex).
- 1987 - The Museum of Natural History opens.

=== 1990s ===
- 1990 - The new science buildings - Cascade Hall, Deschutes Hall, Streisinger Hall, and Willamette Hall - open for classes, marking the completion of the Science Complex.
- 1991 - University Athletics completes the Bowerman Family Building (near Hayward Field) and Casanova Athletic Center (at Autzen Stadium).
- 1994 - Final addition to Knight Library adds another 132,000 square feet (12,300 m^{2}) to the building.
- 1998 - EMU Amphitheater is completed at the corner of 13th and University.
- 1998 - The Moshofsky Sports Center, the only practice facility of its kind in the Pac-10, opens near Autzen Stadium.
- 1999 - The William W. Knight Law Center opens to house the Law School.
- 1999 - The Student Recreation Center opens, which includes a remodel of the adjacent Esslinger Hall.

=== 21st century ===
- 2003 - Lillis Business Complex opens, including Lillis Hall, Chiles Center, Peterson Hall, and Gilbert Hall.
- 2005 - New Many Nations Longhouse opens near the Law School.
- 2006 - Living Learning Center opens, the first new dormitory in over 40 years.
- 2008 - Lorry I. Lokey Laboratories, an underground nanotechnology research facility, opens.
- 2009 - Jaqua Center, a dedicated academic facility for student athletes, opens.
- 2009 - The construction of Matthew Knight Arena begins on February 9
- 2011 - First basketball game is played at Matthew Knight Arena on January 13.
- 2012 - The Global Scholars Hall opens in the fall of 2012.
- 2012 - The Lewis Integrative Science Building opens in the fall of 2012.
- 2013 - Allen Hall reopened in 2013 after an extensive renovation and expansion project.
- 2013 - The Hatfield-Dowlin Complex, a massive football operations facility, opens in 2013.
- 2015 - Student Recreation Center (SRC) reopened in January after an extensive renovation and expansion project.
- 2015 - Straub Hall reopened in March after an extensive renovation and expansion project.
- 2016 - Erb Memorial Union (EMU) reopened after an extensive renovation and expansion project.
- 2016 - The rechristened Allan Price Science Commons and Research Library reopens after an extensive renovation and upgrade.
- 2017 - Kalapuya Ilihi Residence Hall opens near the Law School.

== See also ==
- Christopher Alexander
- Ellis F. Lawrence
- Lists of Oregon-related topics
- The Oregon Experiment
