= John Wesley Johnson (academic administrator) =

President of the University of Oregon (1836–1893)

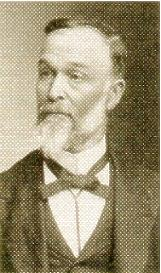

1st President of the University of Oregon
- In office July 26, 1876 – September 14, 1893

Personal details
- Born: March 22, 1836 Missouri, USA
- Died: September 14, 1893 (aged 57) Eugene, Oregon
- Education: Pacific University; Yale University
- Profession: Administrator and Professor

John Wesley Johnson (born 22 March 1836 – September 14, 1893) was an American academic administrator and a notable figure in the early development of Oregon's higher education. He is probably best known today as the first President of the University of Oregon, serving from 1876 to his death in 1893.

== Early years ==
In 1850, John Wesley Johnson and his family immigrated from Missouri to the Oregon Territory. Like many families who ventured West on the Oregon Trail, the Johnsons experienced many hardships. Johnson's mother and sister both died on the journey near Ash Hollow, Nebraska. At 14, Johnson was tasked with driving the family's team of oxen along the 2,000-mile trek to their new home in Corvallis, Oregon. During this period, Corvallis was one of the most politically influential cities in the territory, making it a leading destination for many pioneers. Corvallis briefly served as the territorial capital in 1855.

While growing up in Missouri, Johnson had no formal education and first learned to read and write at the age of 10. As a 17-year-old, Johnson began attending school in Corvallis and was said to have excelled academically. Amongst his teachers, he had a reputation as a brilliant student, which allowed him to graduate early. In 1855, he enrolled in Pacific University in Forest Grove. Johnson completed the college's available higher-level curriculum over the next year and then returned to Corvallis to serve as the first instructor and principal of Corvallis Academy (1856–1860). The academy, which eventually became Oregon State University, offered the first form of public higher education to residents of the Oregon Territory and later the state of Oregon.

Johnson applied to Yale University while still administering Corvallis Academy. However, the cost of attending the prestigious school was too high, and he alone did not have the means to pay for the education. At 24-years-old he secured a loan to cover his tuition and set out by ship for the Eastern Seaboard. The voyage took him South along the Pacific Coast to Panama, where he hiked 10 miles inland to board the newly constructed Isthmus of Panama Railroad. During the trip, he fell ill and later reported that the physical cost of the trip was so severe he was unable to enlist as a soldier in the Civil War. Upon reaching the Eastern shore, he voyaged North by ship to New York City and then by land to his final destination in New Haven, Connecticut. Within two years, Johnson received his law degree from Yale, ranking sixth out of 100 in his graduating class.

Johnson returned to Oregon, initially to practice law, in 1862. However, the demand for highly educated instructors and administrators at local colleges and universities was greater then. Johnson wound up serving as a teacher and administrator at McMinnville College (now Linfield College) from 1863 to 1867. He was eventually promoted to president. He left Linfield College to work as principal of Portland High School and remained there for six years. In 1873, Johnson was hired by the University of Oregon (known then as Oregon State University) as a Latin professor. On July 26, 1876, the University of Oregon Board of Regents met (immediately upon the state land board's official acceptance of Deady Hall) and elected Johnson the school's first president. Thomas Condon, Mary Spiller and Mark Bailey were also elected to the faculty that day.

== University of Oregon ==
During his tenure at the University of Oregon, Johnson taught Greek and Latin. He served not only as president, but as registrar, business officer, provost, dean of students and secretary. His 17 years as president helped foster great expansion at the Eugene school, including the construction of Villard Hall in 1886 and the dormitory (now Friendly Hall) in 1893. Throughout his career, Johnson was a statewide advocate for public higher education in Oregon and overcame many objections by residents and state leaders to public support of local colleges and universities. Johnson died, unexpectedly at 56, while still serving as president in 1893.

== Legacy ==
In 1918, the Administration Building (completed in 1915) was renamed Johnson Hall in honor of John Wesley Johnson. In 1985, the building was added to the National Register of Historic Places.
