= Nike and the University of Oregon =

Relationship between corporate entity and public university, ongoing for decades

Ties between Nike, Inc. and the University of Oregon are ongoing and have existed for decades. The relationship is so close that the institution is sometimes referred to as the "University of Nike".

== Background ==
The "O" logo was designed by Nike in 1998

Nike, Inc. was founded in 1964 as Blue Ribbon Sports. The firm was co-founded by Bill Bowerman and Phillip Knight. Bowerman coached the famed "Men of Oregon" track program and Knight was coached by Bowerman in the 1950s. Knight graduated from UO in 1959 with a business degree.

As I’ve said many times, my business life was born on Hayward Field.

— Phil Knight, (2018)

== History ==
Steve Prefontaine, a UO distance runner, was believed to be the first athlete signed by Nike. He signed a $5000 contract in 1974.

Knight may have made his first contribution to UO in the late-1980s. By the year 2000 Knight contributed $50 million to the university. As of 2023, Knight has contributed in excess of $1 billion towards the University of Oregon. Knight has contributed significant personal funds towards building and maintaining the university's athletic apparatus. Knight has donated completed buildings to the university's athletic program. Many of these buildings are regarded as extravagant or opulent. Nike designers often play a role in designing interior spaces.

Knight allegedly contributed $40,000 towards UO president Dave Frohnmayer's annual salary in the 1990s.

Bowerman contributed funds to the Bowerman Family Building, which used to be adjacent to Hayward Field. The facility was subsequently demolished.

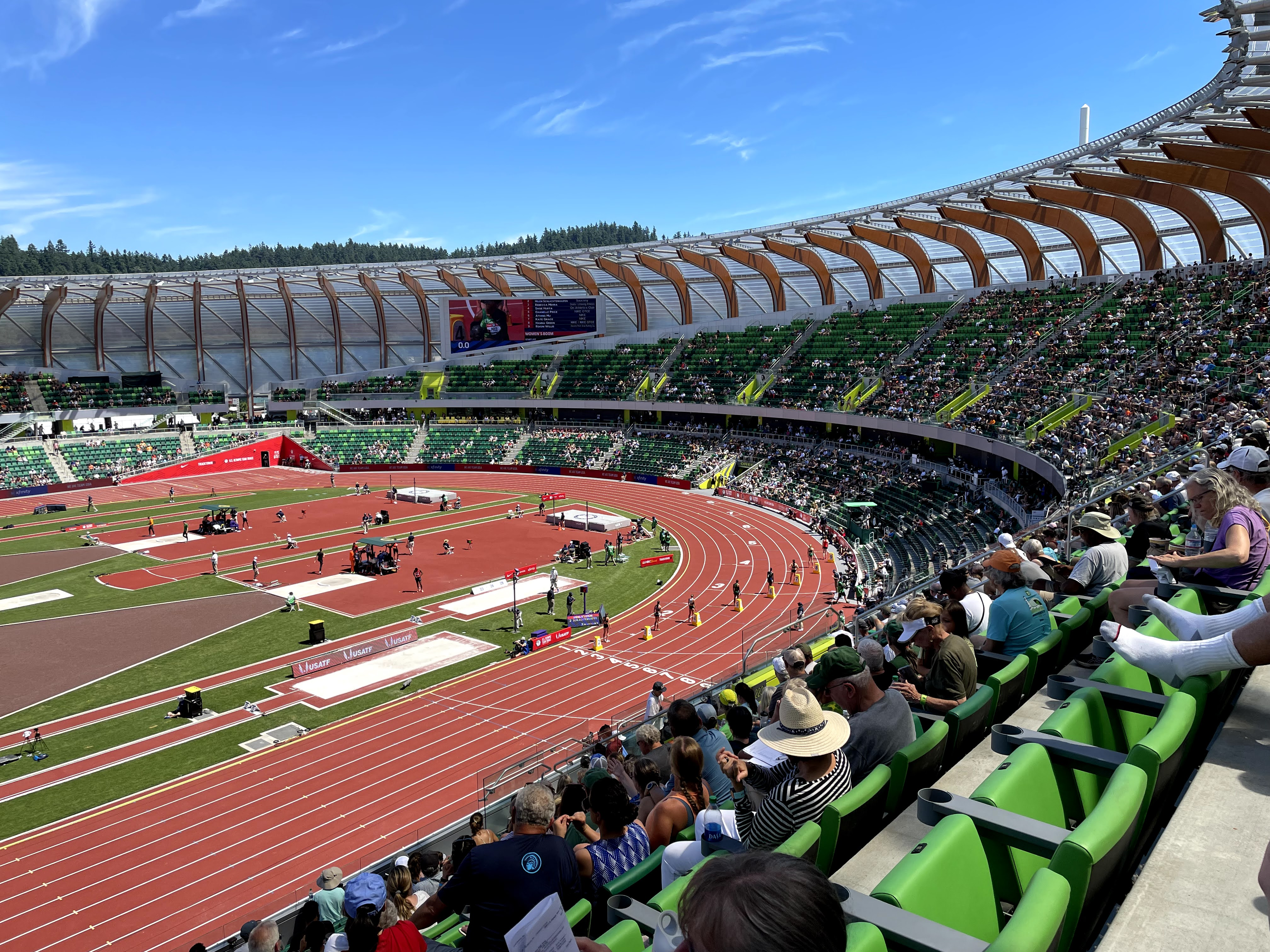
Renovated Hayward Field

The school's "O" logo was designed by Nike in 1998 and sports facility projects on campus typically involve both Knight and Nike. The outside of the logo represents Autzen Stadium and the inside represents Hayward Field. These stadiums house the football and track programs respectively.

Nike designs the University of Oregon football program's team attire. New unique combinations are issued before every game day.

More recently, the corporation donated $13.5 million towards the renovation and expansion of Hayward Field.

In recent years the university has embraced its ties to Nike.

=== Timeline ===
- 1934: Bill Bowerman graduates from UO
- 1948: Bill Bowerman becomes head coach of the track and field team
- 1959: Phil Knight graduates from UO
- 1964: Blue Ribbon Sports formed
- 1974: Nike signs its first athlete, UO's Steve Prefontaine, to $5000 contract
- 1988: Phil Knight makes contribution towards renovation of the Main Library, subsequently renamed Knight Library
- 1998: Bill Bowerman dies
- 1998: Nike designs "O" logo
- 2000: UO joins Workers Rights Consortium
- 2000: Knight withdraws major donation towards Autzen Stadium renovation
- 2002: UO adopts "O" logo campus-wide
- 2007: Knight contributes $100 million to Athletic Legacy Fund
- 2010: Knight funded John E. Jaqua Center for Student Athletes opens
- 2011: Matthew Knight Arena opens
- 2013: Knight funded Hatfield-Dowlin Complex opens
- 2016: Knight makes $500 million gift towards Phil and Penny Knight Campus for Accelerating Scientific Impact
- 2016: Nike pledges $13.5 million towards Hayward Field renovation
- 2020: Knight Campus officially opens
- 2021: Knight makes second $500 million gift to Knight Campus

== Effect on physical plant ==
As of 2023, 16.5% of UO's gross square footage (based on building inventory) is purpose-built for the university's NCAA sports program. UO's NCAA program currently occupies 1,492,802 gross square feet of building space. Many of these facilities are only accessible to student athletes.

UO adopted The Oregon Experiment's campus planning framework in the 1970s, which was developed by UC Berkeley architecture professor Christopher Alexander. In the proceeding decades UO has moved further away from this framework. UO's athletic facilities have embraced different design ideals and do not involve university input. It can be said that the athletic department rejects The Oregon Experiment.

== Controversial nature of relationship ==
Nike, Inc.'s ties are discussed at length in the book University of Nike by Joshua Hunt. Hunt alleges that this relationship became more pronounced due to state higher education disinvestment.

Knight has advocated for the university's sports programs, especially football. Knight's building projects often do not involve university oversight or input. Knight has also advocated for privatising the university and contributed to a Political Action Committee that advanced his wishes. In the early 2010s, with the backing of Knight, the university attempted to breakaway from state higher-ed oversight and obtain $800 million up front from the state legislature.

In the early 2000s Knight controversially withdrew a significant contribution towards renovating the university's football stadium. This was due to the university signing the Workers Rights Consortium. Knight subsequently made amends and made his contribution. However, he went two decades without making a significant contribution to academics.

But for me personally, there will be no further donations of any kind to the University of Oregon. At this time, this is not a situation that can be resolved. The bonds of trust, which allowed me to give at a high level, have been shredded.

— Phil Knight, (2000)

In 2005, Knight allegedly attempted to strong-arm the university's then president, Dave Frohnmayer, into firing both the athletic director and track and field coach. According to reports, Knight threatened to withhold funds towards the construction of a new basketball arena. By 2007 both were gone. Knight allegedly wanted to install his personal friend Pat Kilkenny as the new athletic director. At the time Kilkenny did not have experience managing a multimillion-dollar a year athletic program. Ultimately, Kilkenny became the new athletic director.
