= Johnson Hall (Eugene, Oregon) =

- U.S. National Register of Historic Places
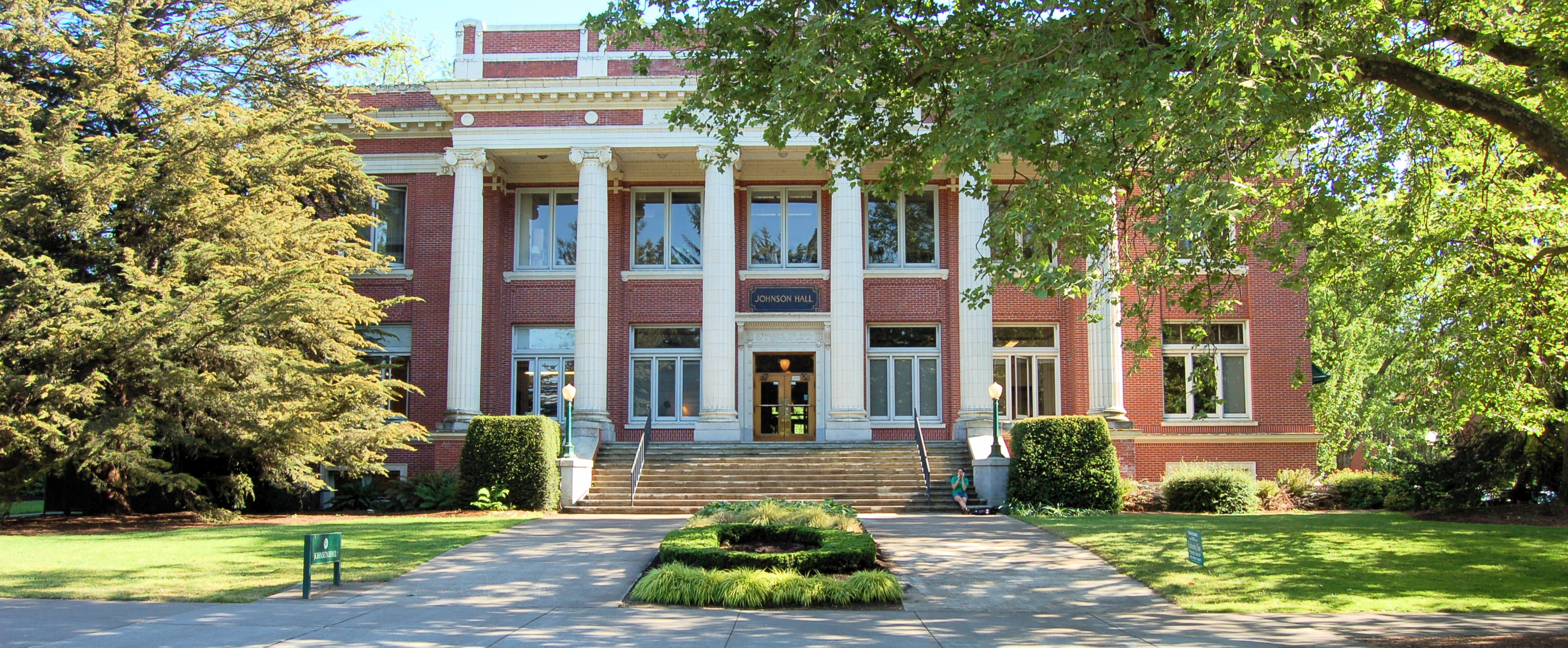
- Johnson Hall in 2006

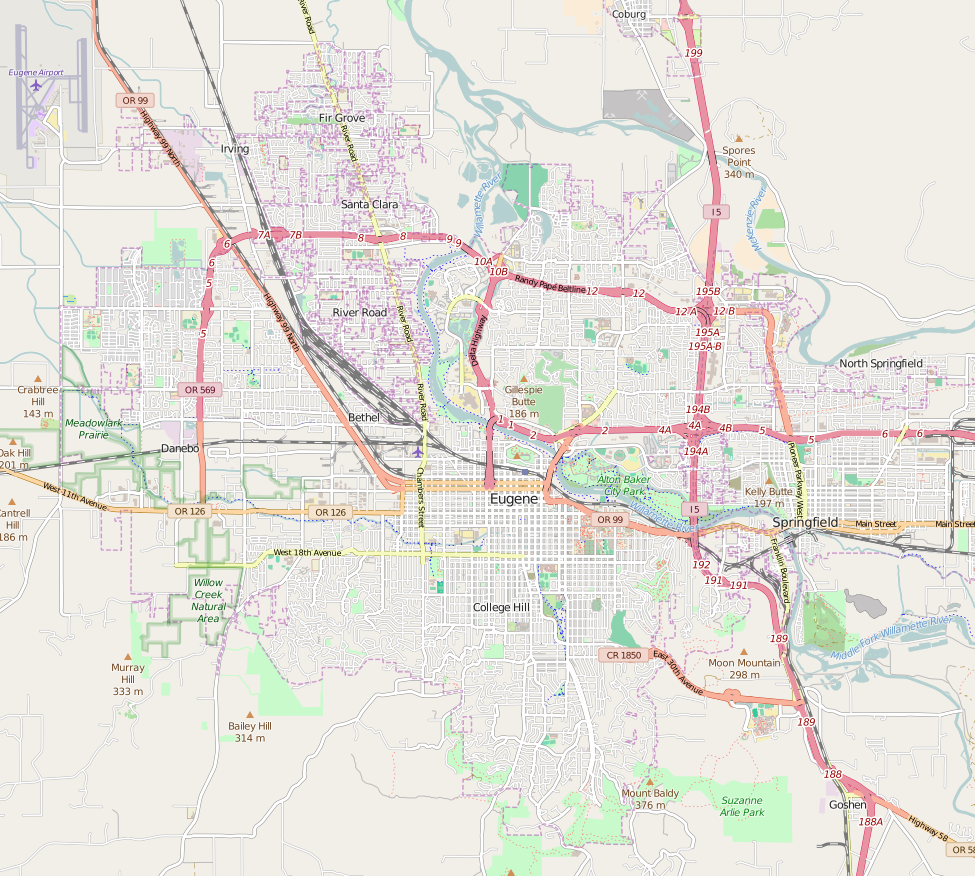
- Location within Eugene OR Location within Oregon
- Location: University of Oregon
- Coordinates: 44°02′42.4464″N 123°04′32.7864″W
- Built: 1915
- Built by: Boyajohn Arnold
- Architect: William C. Knighton
- Architectural style: American Renaissance
- NRHP reference No.: 85001351
- Added to NRHP: June 20, 1985

Johnson Hall, located in Eugene, Oregon, is the main administration building of the University of Oregon. It is listed in the National Register of Historic Places. The building was constructed in 1914–1915 from plans submitted by Oregon State Architect William C. Knighton in the American Renaissance style. The building's name was changed in 1918 to honor John Wesley Johnson, the first president of the university.

== History ==
Johnson Hall, when it was constructed in 1915, was originally designed to house administrative offices and other campus services just like it still does today. The second floor includes the offices of the President, Registrar, Business Manager and all of their related support facilities. All other services were located on the first and basement floors. In its beginnings, Johnson Hall housed the Guild Theater, major department offices, classrooms and a collections exhibit. At the time when the building was completed the total cost of the project amounted to $103,829.96 making it the most expensive building on campus in 1915.

In 1949, renovation removed the Guild Theater whose function was replaced by the "New University Theater" (Robinson Theater at Villard Hall). The beloved glass panels on the roof of Johnson were dispersed after the renovation. Some sections of the panels were located at the Erb Memorial Union until when in 1998 restoration once again moved the stained glass panels. Today some portions of the glass panels can be seen in the Johnson Hall boardroom while others can be seen in the second story windows of Lawrence Hall.

With the late 1960s and early 1970s came the Counterculture and anti-war sentiment. Eugene was flooded with anti-war rallies as students began to take a side against the American conflict in Vietnam. On March 23, 1970 students entered took to Johnson Hall and held an all-night sit-in. Administration allowed the sit-in after talking to the crowd and announcing that as long as the students allowed the administration to return home to their families, they would permit the protestors to remain in the building overnight. The president, however, constantly reminded the students that their occupation of the building was an infraction of the law. According to newspaper reports as many as 200 students spent the night in Johnson Hall.

The sit-in continued all day Thursday and by that evening there seemed to be no resolution in sight. President Robert Clark informed the protesters that he would not allow them to remain in the building for another night. He also told them that if they did not leave peacefully they would be arrested for trespassing. Clark finally made the decision to call the police. Eugene police, backed by Lane County sheriff's deputies, entered the building from the front and rear doors.

Students did not try to resist until they were pulled out of the circle they had formed on the floor of the lobby and handcuffed. After this, chaos erupted at the south entrance of the building while a group of protesters staged a sit-down around the police vans. The police reacted quickly and released tear gas, clearing a way for the vans. It was at that point the National Guard entered. The crowd of spectators swelled outside Johnson Hall that day to about 700 people after the sit-in was dispersed. Many followed the police vans as they made their hurried exit from campus, throwing rocks, trash and anything they could find. The police and national guard intervention resulted in 61 arrests for trespassing and or disorderly conduct that day.

== Architecture ==
Johnson Hall is of the classically derived American Renaissance style. The style and elevations are unique to the Eugene area. The building itself is composed of brick veneer, terra cotta, and reinforced concrete. Through the years the interior of the building has had some renovations but all in all it still retains its original design very well (minus the Guild Theater). When it was first constructed by Knighton in 1915, the building consisted of a four-sided pitched roof with a flat fifth surface in the middle. The middle surface consisted of a large skylight that allowed light in through the center of the building.

Contextually within the campus design, Johnson Hall completes a north/south axis. With its two glass door entrances, the design helps to maintain the relationship between the "Old Quadrangle" and the "Woman's Quadrangle". Further, the building is contextually significant in the campus design, placing the administration building close to the center of campus.

=== Ellis Lawrence Contribution ===
Ellis F. Lawrence, the university's major architect was involved with parts of the design for Johnson Hall in addition to Knighton. President Prince Lucian Campbell referred to Lawrence as the "advisory architect" during the construction and even though his contributions were small, Lawrence was said to have had four inputs during the construction of the building.

1. He found the location and advised from an outside position on its design with Knighton.
2. He attempted to improve the acoustics of the Guild Theater with different drapes and floor covering; however, no one is sure if this was accomplished or not.
3. When the hall was named in honor of the university's first president, Johnson in 1918, Lawrence advised against the terra cotta frieze on which "Administration Building" appeared and instead advocated for using a sign with 6-inch bronze Roman letters over the entrance which read "Johnson Hall". This sign still remains above the entrance today.
4. In 1919 Lawrence advised Glenn Stanton from the school of architecture to design the bronze commemorative sign which is also inside the building today.

== Appearances in media ==
In 1978 Johnson Hall was featured in the American comedy film National Lampoon's Animal House, directed by John Landis. Several scenes were shot inside the Dean's office and outside the building's north entrance.

== See also ==
- National Register of Historic Places listings in Lane County, Oregon
