= Friendly Hall =

Coordinates: 44°2′45.4″N 123°4′30.7″W

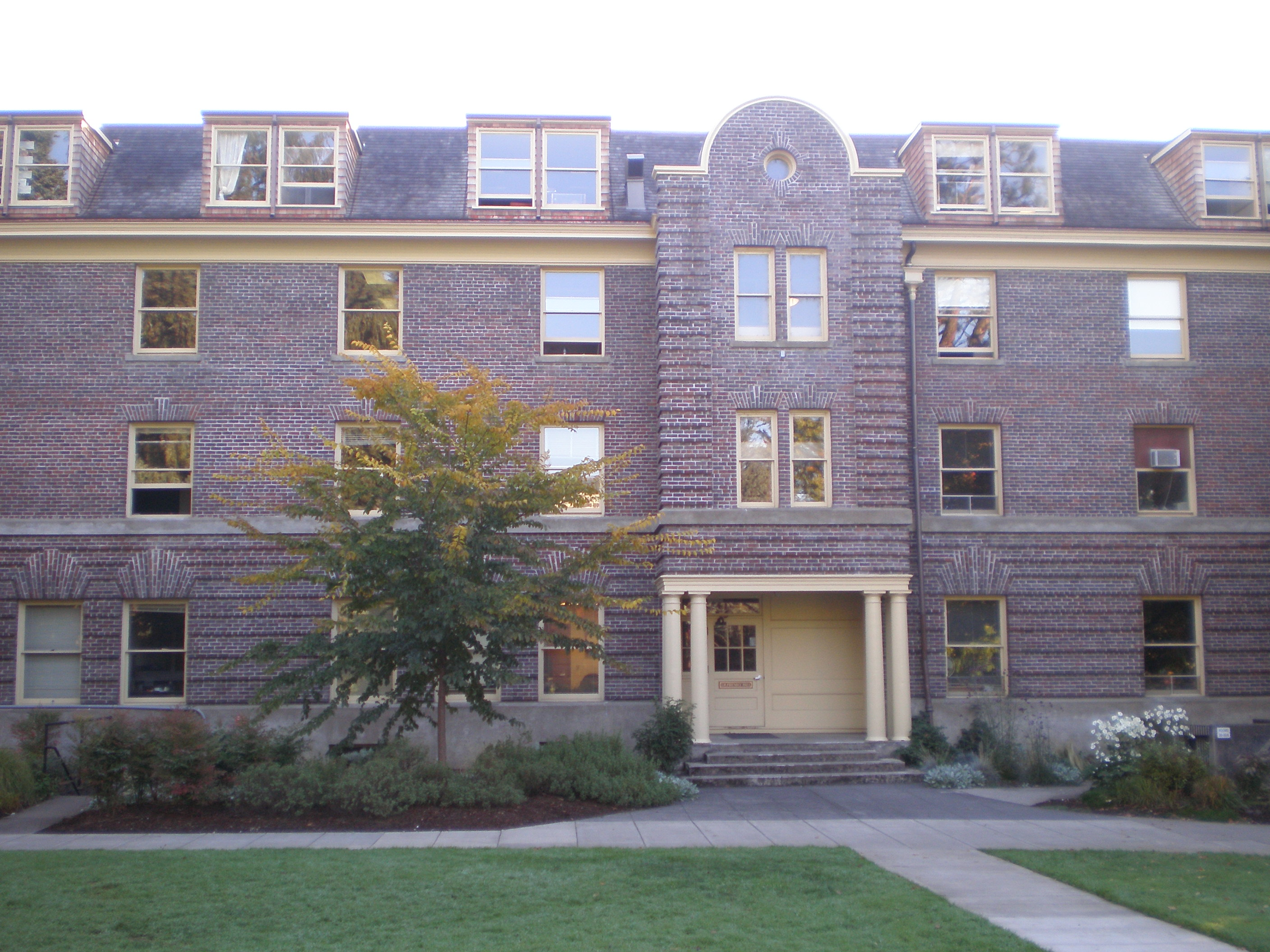
Friendly Hall in 2011

Friendly Hall, built in 1893, is a three-story, red-brick masonry building located on the University of Oregon campus in Eugene, Oregon, United States.

== Description ==
Friendly Hall overlooks the old campus quad, which dates to the founding of the university in 1876 and which includes some of the oldest and most historically significant buildings on campus, including University Hall (1876), Villard Hall (1886) and Fenton Hall (1906). The building was named for Samson Friendly, a Eugene merchant, Eugene city mayor (1893–95) and a member of the Union University Association, which established the university.

== History ==
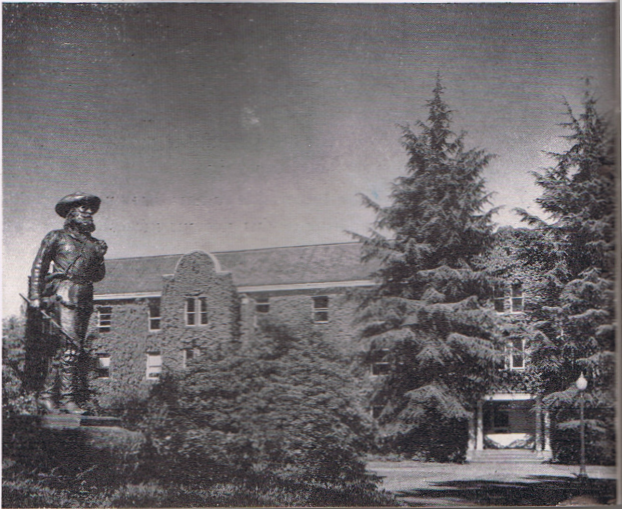
Friendly Hall with The Pioneer statue in the foreground, c. 1958

The building was designed in a Jacobean style by the renowned Portland architectural firm Whidden & Lewis, who devised many of the most significant buildings in Portland, including Portland City Hall. Completed in 1893, the building was intended to be co-ed housing for the students at the school with separate entrances for men in the north and women in the south, and a communal dining area in the center. This idea only lasted for one year before it was converted to a fully male dormitory. The building continued to be used in this fashion until 1928, when Straub Hall opened as the new dorm and it was then converted into office space. The building was renovated in 1914, 1920, 1933, 1957, and 1961, when 27 new rooms were added. It is currently used as offices for the Department of Romance Languages.

== See also ==
- University of Oregon campus
- List of University of Oregon buildings
