= Collier House (University of Oregon) =

Historic landmark in Eugene, Oregon

Coordinates: 44°02′42″N 123°04′30″W

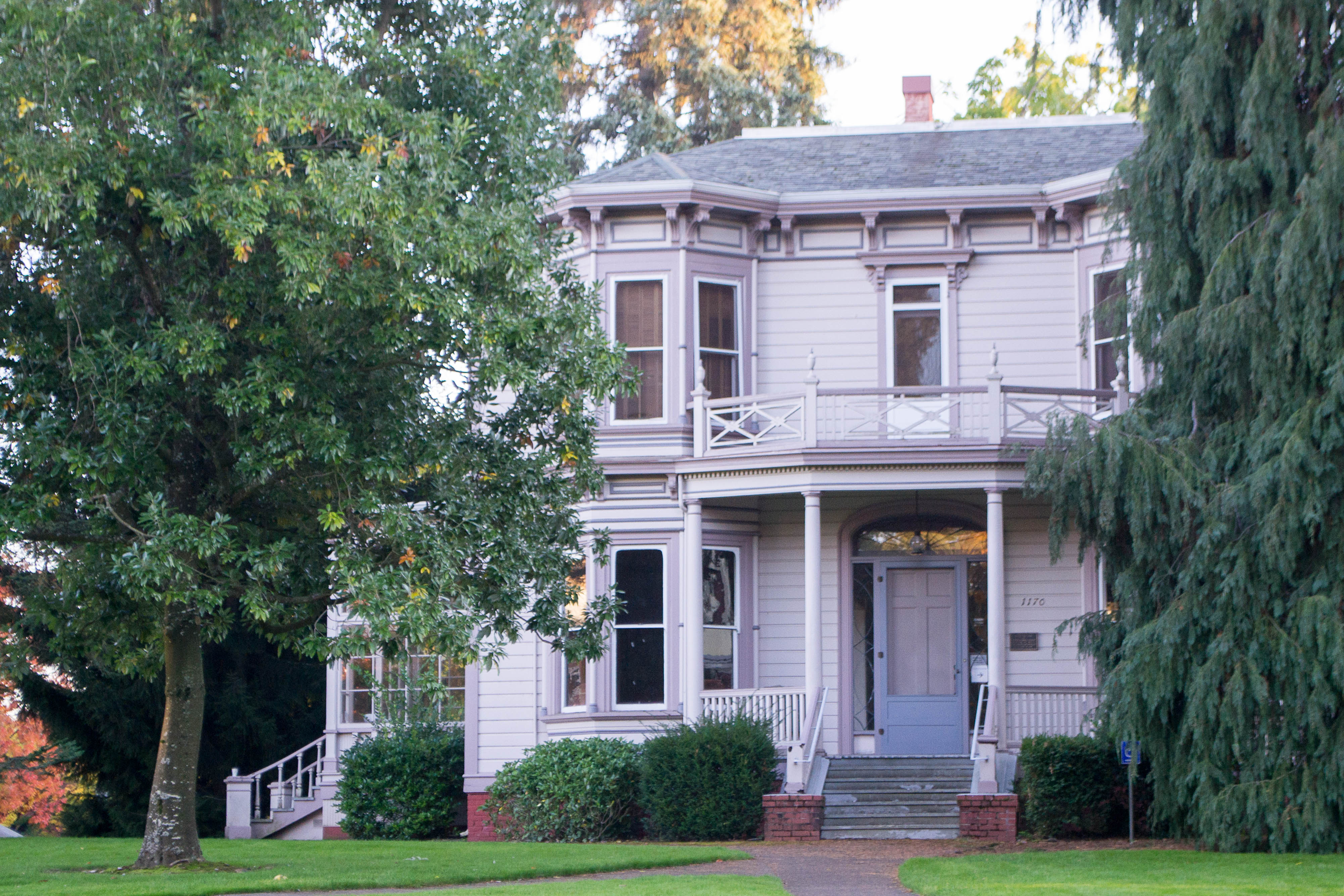
North facade of Collier House

Collier House is a historic landmark building located in Eugene, Oregon, United States. It was built in 1886 by George Collier, a physics and chemistry professor at the University of Oregon, and his two sons to his own design. It was originally built as his residence but was sold to the university in 1893, when it joined University and Villard halls as the third building on the fledgling campus. It lies on the corner of University Street and 13th Avenue.

Over the years the Italianate building has served as a dormitory, the university president's residence, the school's library, the faculty club, offices, a meeting space, and a restaurant and pub. As of autumn 2015, the building is used as classroom, office, and performance space by the musicology and ethnomusicology department in the School of Music and Dance.

In October 2018, it was announced that the university would be looking to build a new 60,000-square-foot classroom and faculty office building, and was exploring various sites on campus. One was the site of the Collier House, located on the corner of University Street and 13th Avenue. On October 19, 2018, the Campus Planning Committee voted unanimously to recommend the current Collier House site as the location of the new classroom building. McArthur Court and the parking lot across the street from Prince Lucien Campbell (PLC) Hall were the other two options.

Due to the Collier House being a Eugene historic landmark structure, the university had to approve a new location to move the building to, rather than simply tear it down. On November 27, 2018, the Campus Planning Committee voted 9–1 to approve the Gerlinger Hall lawn as the new location for the Collier House. The move was projected to be completed sometime between 2019 and 2021, as construction of the new classroom building was slated to be complete in 2021. However, the Campus Planning Committee noted that the proposed move to Gerlinger Hall lawn would have required an amendment to the Campus Plan, which designates the lawn as a green space, and approval of the City of Eugene. As of July 2025, no such amendment to the Campus Plan has been made, and Collier House remains in its original location.

== See also ==
- List of University of Oregon buildings
