= Lillis Business Complex =

Coordinates: 44.04605°N 123.07756°W

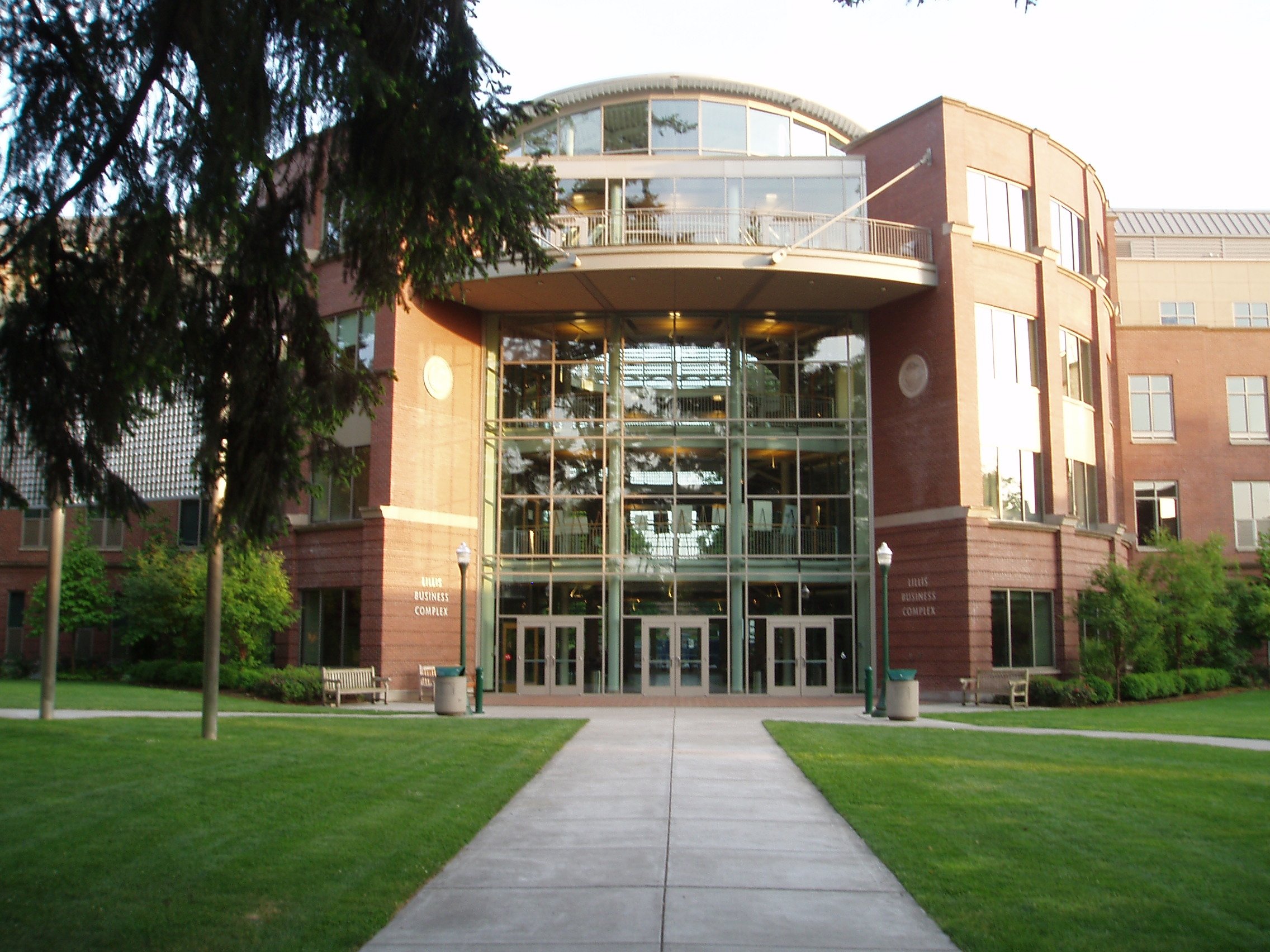
North side of the Lillis Business Complex

The Lillis Business Complex (LCB) is a building on the University of Oregon campus in Eugene, Oregon. It is home to the Charles H. Lundquist College of Business (thus the LCB acronym for the Complex). The complex consists of four buildings; the new main building (called Lillis Hall), completed in 2003, and three older buildings, Anstett Hall, Peterson Hall, and the Chiles Business Center.

== History ==
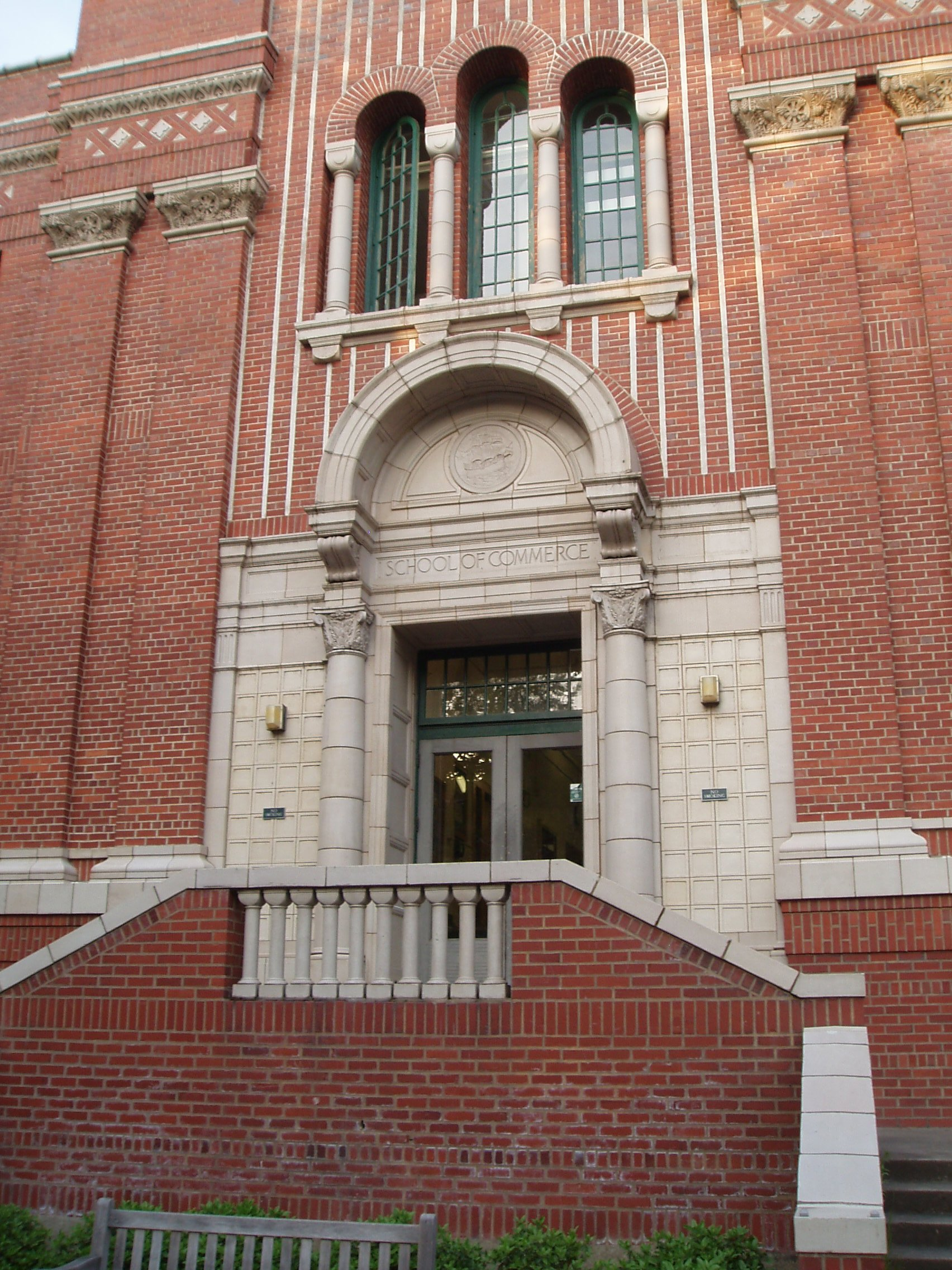
"School of Commerce" still appears above the front doorway of Anstett Hall.

The oldest building is Peterson Hall, which was completed in 1916 as the Education Building. In 1921, Anstett Hall, then called the Commerce Building, was completed to house the Business School. The two buildings were designed as a pair by the University Architect, Ellis F. Lawrence, and were designed to serve as "entry pylons" for the main campus quadrangle (now called the Memorial Quadrangle).

Commonwealth Hall opened in 1952, and connected Oregon Hall (formerly Education) and Commerce. In 1975, Commonwealth Hall was renamed after James H. Gilbert, and Education was renamed Gilbert West, while Commerce became Gilbert East.

The Chiles Business Center was completed (adjacent to the Gilberts) in 1986 to accommodate the expanding Lundquist College of Business. In 2001, Gilbert Hall (the former Commonwealth) was demolished to make way for construction of the Lillis Business Complex. At that time, Gilbert West (formerly Oregon Hall and Education) was renamed Peterson Hall, and later, Gilbert East took the name Anstett Hall.

The 2003 construction of the Lillis Business Complex resulted in the linking of all three existing buildings with the new Lillis "backbone." In addition, Lillis Hall contains numerous faculty offices, classrooms, a lecture hall, and an auditorium.

== Architecture ==
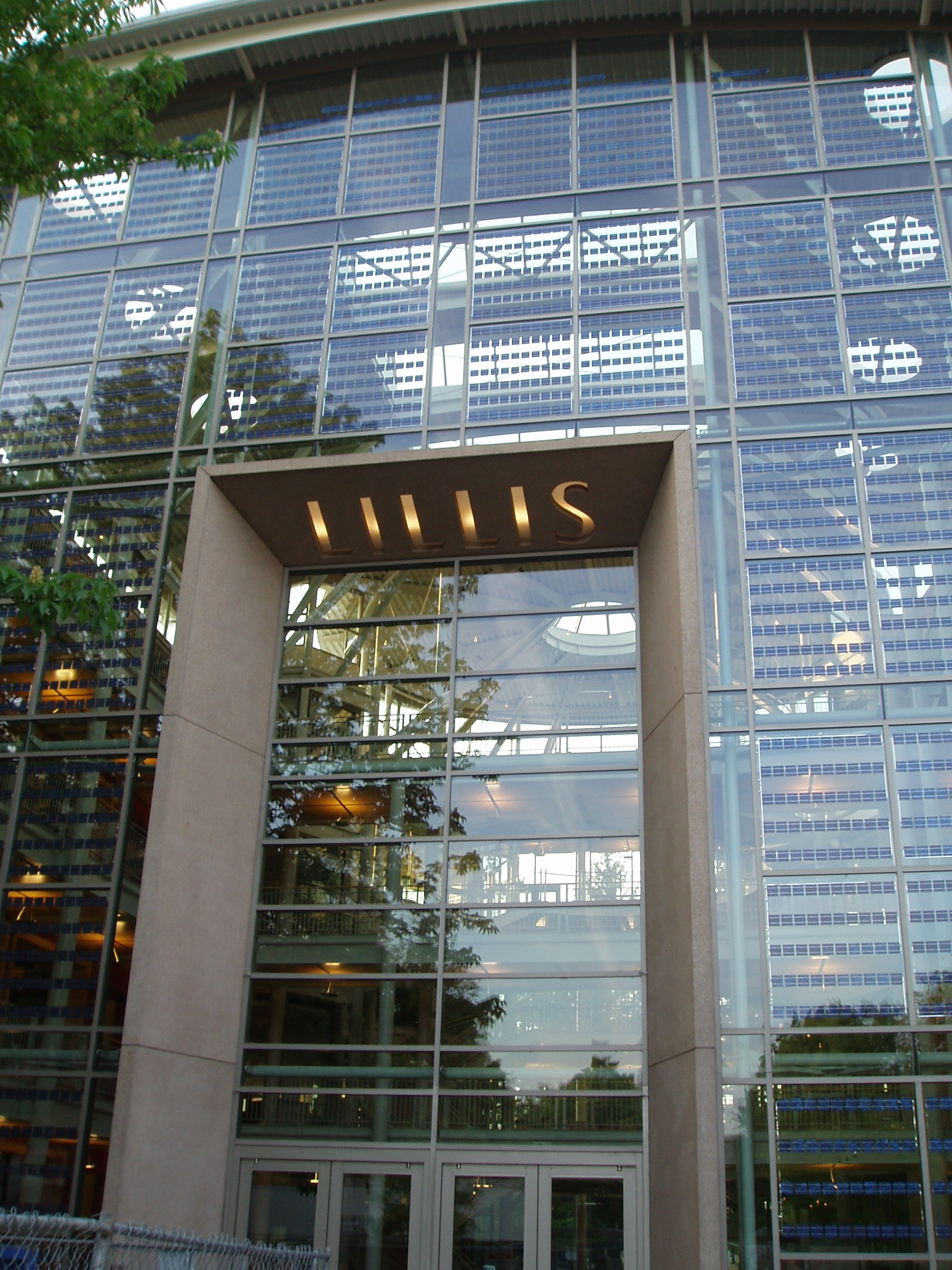
Detail view of the solar glass around the entrance.

The Lillis Business Complex combines 1920s architecture (embodied in the paired Peterson and Anstett Halls, flanking the main entrance to Lillis) with state-of-the-art facilities and sustainable design. The front of the building (facing 13th street and the Memorial Quadrangle) features photovoltaic cells embedded in the glass, which provide a portion of the building's energy. In addition, the building, classrooms, and offices were oriented so as to maximize the use of natural light, and all rooms are outfitted with the latest sensor technology to minimize energy usage.

=== Awards ===
The atrium solar array is the largest installation of architectural solar glass in the Northwest United States, although about a third of the array does not generate power due to a large shade tree and the blocking of the afternoon sun by part of the building. University maintenance crews also placed trash cans in front of the lowest level of the solar panels, ensuring that this section of the array cannot generate electricity.

== See also ==
- List of University of Oregon buildings
- Wind Fence, a sculpture on the north side of the complex
