= Nels Roney =

American building contractor and carpenter

Lord Nelson Roney
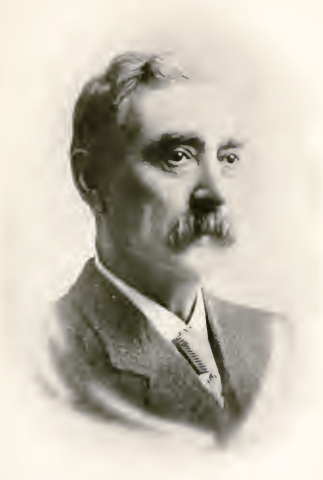
- Born: September 2, 1853; Wapakoneta, Ohio
- Died: November 24, 1944 (aged 91); Eugene, Oregon
- Occupation(s): Carpenter, bridge builder
- Years active: 1876–1918
- Known for: Oregon covered bridges, commercial and residential buildings
- Notable work: Villard Hall, McMorran and Washburne Department Store Building, Shelton McMurphey Johnson House

Lord Nelson "Nels" Roney (September 2, 1853 – November 24, 1944) was a building contractor and carpenter working primarily in the U.S. state of Oregon. He designed and built many of Oregon's early covered bridges, often using the Howe truss. Roney also built bridges for the Oregon and California Railroad from Roseburg, Oregon south to Redding, California, and he constructed commercial buildings and houses in Eugene, Oregon.

== Early life ==
Roney was born in Wapakoneta, Ohio, on September 2, 1853, one of 12 children. His parents named him Lord Nelson in honor of the British admiral and hero, Lord Horatio Nelson. Roney may have found the name pretentious, and he preferred "Nels." The Roneys moved to Missouri where Nels began a three-year apprenticeship as a carpenter, earning 17 cents per day his first year. His wages increased to 36 cents per day his second year, and 54 cents per day his third year.

Roney settled in Eugene City (now Eugene) in 1876, when the local population had almost reached 1,000.

== Bridge building ==
Eugene Skinner had operated a ferry crossing the Willamette River near his Donation Land Claim, but Roney arrived at a time when the growing town of Eugene City needed a bridge. Roney worked on the bridge project, a precursor to Ferry Street Bridge. When many Oregon bridges washed out in the floods of January 1881, Roney was often hired to rebuild.

As the Oregon and California Railroad expanded south into California, Roney took charge of bridge building from Roseburg to Redding.

In 1912 Roney was appointed Superintendent of Lane County bridges.

== Commercial and residential buildings ==
Roney is credited with building many commercial and residential structures in Eugene. A partial list includes

- Villard Hall (with W. H. Abrams)
- McMorran and Washburne Department Store Building
- First National Bank Building
- Smeede Hotel (employed by George H. Park)
- Hoffman House Hotel (demolished)
- Eugene Opera House (demolished)
- Lane County Courthouse tower (demolished)
- Lane County Bank (demolished)
- Shelton McMurphey Johnson House
- Episcopal and Methodist churches

== See also ==
- List of Oregon covered bridges
- National Register of Historic Places listings in Lane County, Oregon
