= McMorran and Washburne Department Store Building =

- U.S. National Register of Historic Places
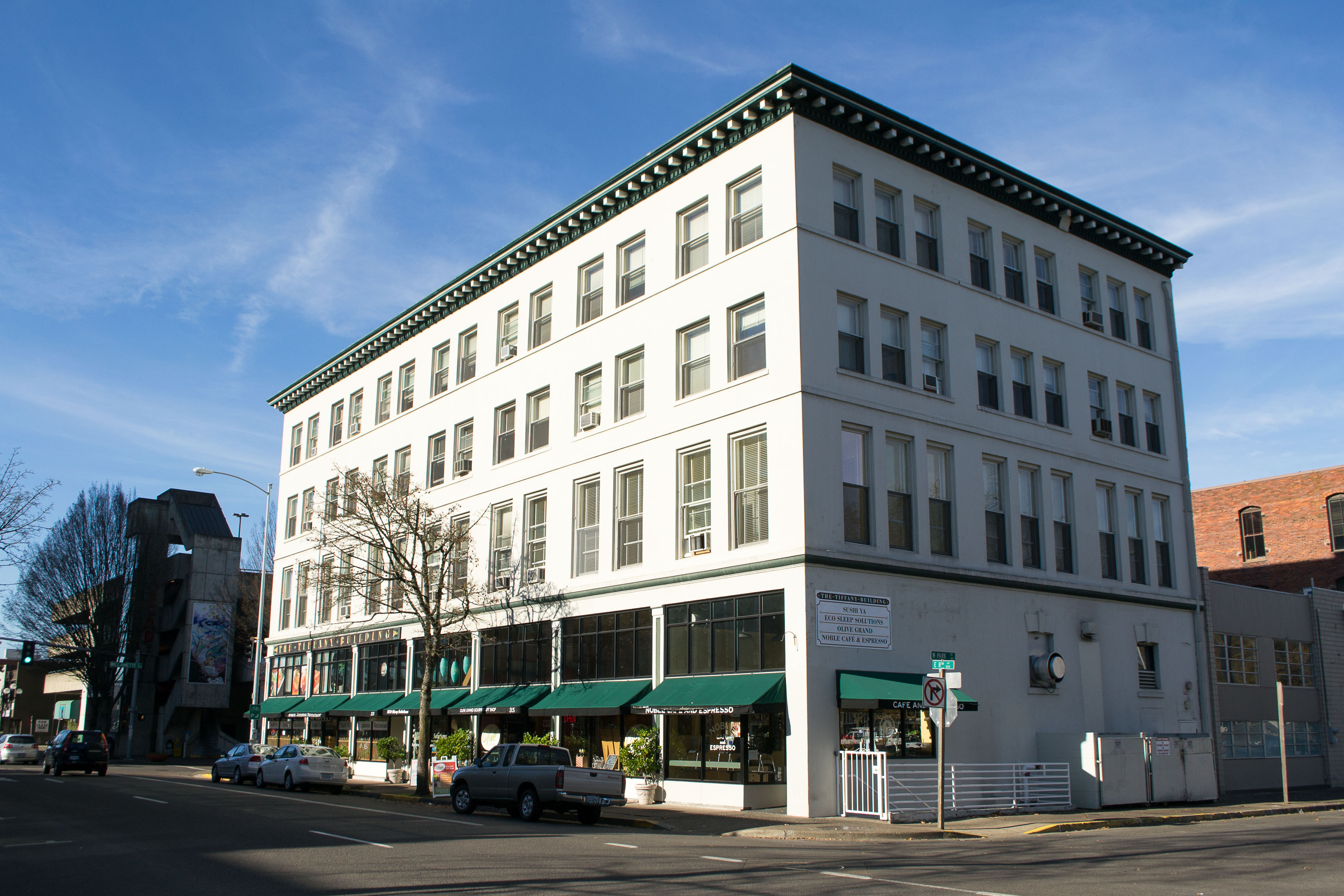
- The McMorran and Washburne Building in 2013
- Location: 795 Willamette Street; Eugene, Oregon
- Coordinates: 44°03′04″N 123°05′33″W
- Built: 1902
- Built by: Nels Roney
- Architectural style: Chicago commercial
- NRHP reference No.: 89000125
- Added to NRHP: March 2, 1989

The McMorran and Washburne Building in 2026

The McMorran and Washburne Department Store Building, also known as the Tiffany Building, is a four-story commercial structure in Eugene, Oregon, in the United States. The original two-story building was constructed in 1902 by Nels Roney as a dry goods store owned by former Eugene mayor J. H. McClung. The building was expanded to four stories in 1913.

== History ==
John H. McClung arrived in Oregon and began farming in 1856. With his uncle, he established the first drug store in Eugene in 1859. In 1902 he built the two-story McClung Building at Eighth and Willamette, operating a dry goods store under the name, Cockerline and Fraley. The building featured elements of what came to be known as Chicago commercial style, with large display windows and reduced ornamentation.

George H. McMorran and Carl G. Washburne became business partners, opening a dry goods store in 1909. The two had worked as store clerks for Samson H. Friendly in Eugene. In 1913 McMorran and Washburne purchased and renovated the McClung building, adding two floors. McMorran and Washburne became Eugene's premiere dry goods store, and in 1927 the store outgrew its location and was moved to a new building at the corner of Broadway and Willamette.

When McMorran and Washburne vacated the building, it was purchased by drugstore owners Albert Tiffany and George Davis, and the name was changed to the Tiffany Building.

The building was listed on the National Register of Historic Places March 2, 1989, under the historic name, McMorran and Washburne Department Store Building.

== Current usage ==
Restaurant and retail businesses occupy the ground floor of the building, and the three upper stories have been converted to apartments.

== See also ==
- National Register of Historic Places listings in Lane County, Oregon
