= MarAbel B. Frohnmayer Music Building =

Coordinates: 44.040712°N 123.078053°W

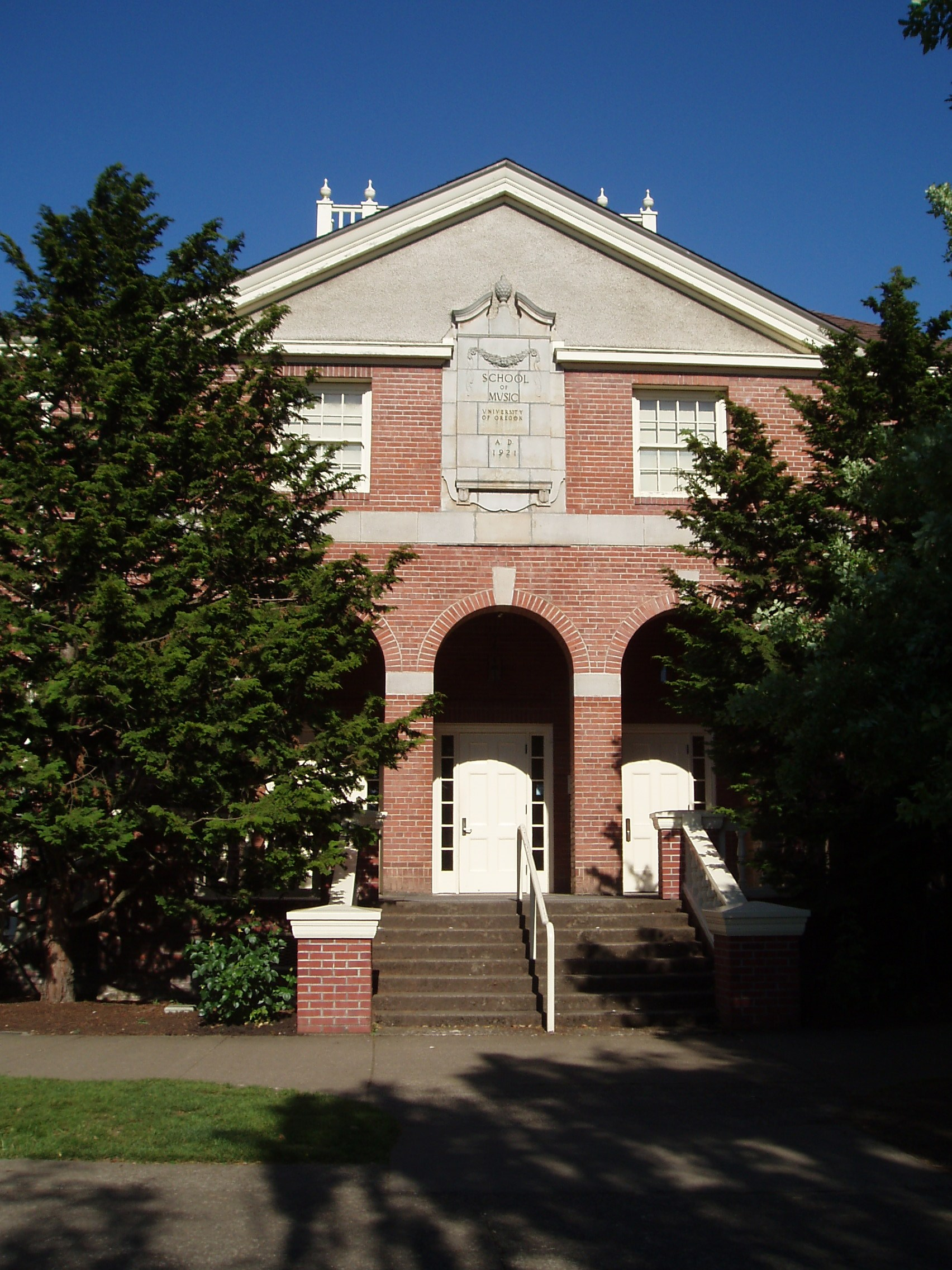
West facade of the Frohnmayer Music Building, at the entrance to Beall Hall. The inscription over the entrance reads "School of Music - University of Oregon - AD 1921."

The MarAbel B. Frohnmayer Music Building is the home of the School of Music and Dance at the University of Oregon in Eugene, Oregon. The building was originally built in 1924, expanded in 1948, 1955, and 1977, and was renamed after MarAbel B. Frohnmayer in 2005.

== History ==
Construction on the original Music Building was started in 1922, with plans designed by Ellis F. Lawrence, head of the University's School of Architecture and Allied Arts and University Architect. It was part of Lawrence's master plan for the University and the original building's architecture is highly reminiscent of that of the Memorial Quadrangle and the School of Education.

Beall Hall, at the northern end of the building, was the last part of the original structure completed. The building was finished in 1924, though the inscription over the entrance to Beall Hall on the west facade gives "AD 1921." Unlike other buildings on campus, which were built around the same time, the Music Building was funded by private capital, which the University repaid with interest in subsequent years. In 1948 and 1955, additional classrooms, offices, and practice rooms were added to the south part of the building, extending it to 18th Avenue. The 1977 addition included large rehearsal rooms and classrooms on the north side of Beall Hall, and an expansion of the student commons in the center of the building.

In 2005, the University announced the renaming of the building and a $15.2 million expansion and renovation. As of May 2007, construction is currently underway, and is expected to be completed by Fall 2008. Lorry I. Lokey, founder of Business Wire, is among the top benefactors.

== Beall Concert Hall ==
Beall Concert Hall (pronounced "bell") is located in the northern part of the Frohnmayer Music Building. It serves as the performance venue for the School of Music's many ensembles and bands, and is used for over 200 performances each year. During the summer, the hall is home to many Oregon Bach Festival concerts. It contains a Jürgen Ahrend organ, which was completed in 1972. A bequest of Robert Vinton Beall, an 1897 graduate of the University, funded the organ and the hall was named in his honor in 1973. The architecture of Beall Concert Hall is reminiscent of the Boston Symphony Hall, which was studied by Ellis F. Lawrence during his time as an architecture student in Boston.

== MarAbel B. Frohnmayer ==
MarAbel Braden Frohnmayer (January 16, 1909 - October 12, 2003), the namesake of the Frohnmayer Music Building, graduated from the University of Oregon with a B.A. in Music in 1932. She was a long-time supporter of the School of Music, and taught elementary and secondary school music classes in McMinnville, Merrill, and Medford. Two of her children received degrees from the School of Music. Mira Frohnmayer (B.Mus. 1960) was Professor and Chair of Vocal Studies at Pacific Lutheran University and Philip Frohnmayer (M.Mus. 1972) was Professor and Chair of Vocal Studies at Loyola University New Orleans. Additionally, her son John Frohnmayer received his J.D. from the University of Oregon School of Law in 1972, and was chairman of the National Endowment for the Arts from 1989 to 1992. Her oldest son, David B. Frohnmayer, was president of the University of Oregon between 1994 and 2009.
