= Erb Memorial Union =

Student union building in the University of Oregon, Eugene, Oregon, United States

Coordinates: 44.044674°N 123.073752°W

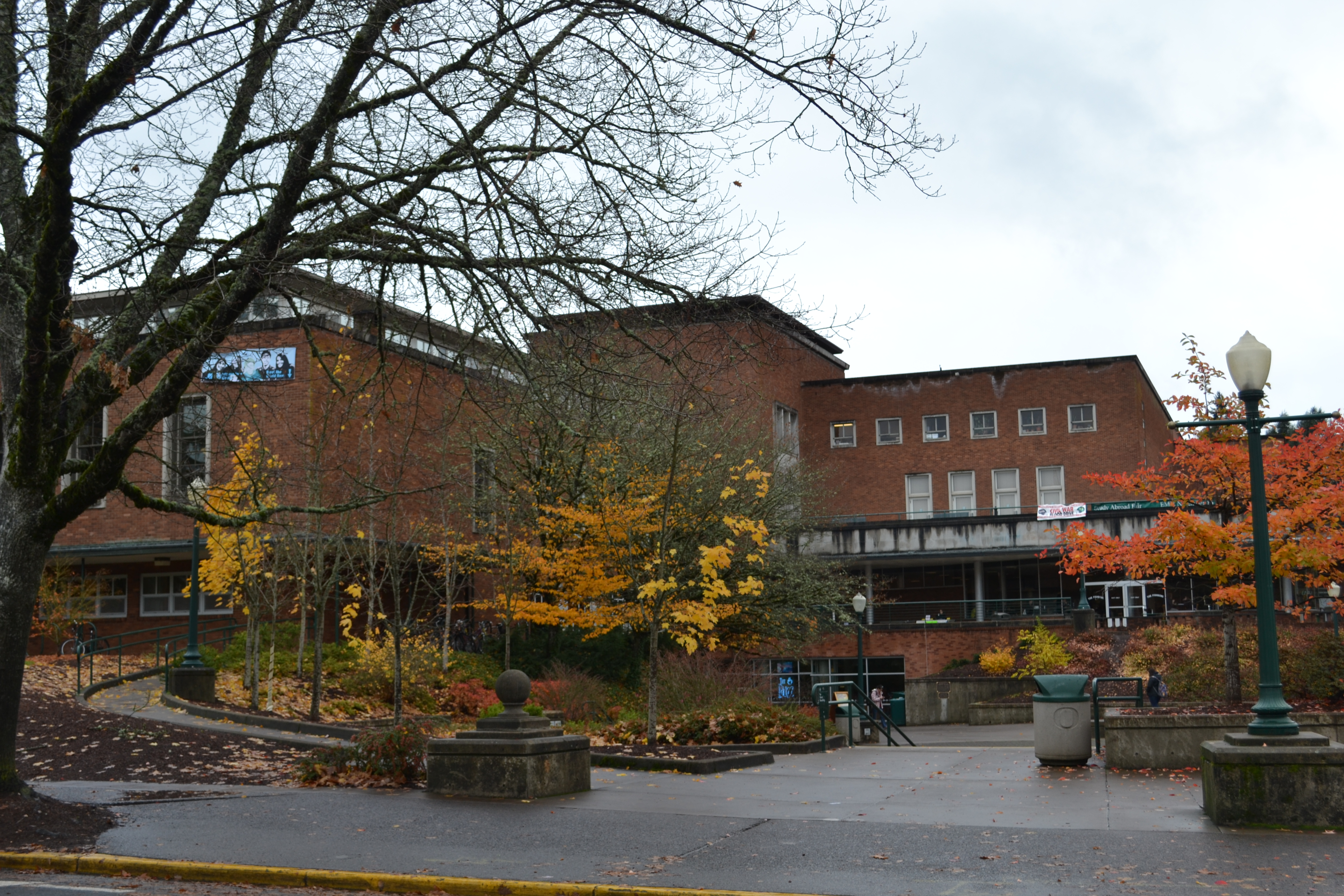
Erb Memorial Union

The Erb Memorial Union (EMU) is the student union building of the University of Oregon in Eugene, Oregon, United States.

== History ==
The building was constructed in 1950. It was named for Donald M. Erb, who served as the University's seventh president from 1938 to 1943. Two subsequent additions were built in 1962 and 1973 respectively.

== Facilities ==
The EMU dining facility known as "The Fishbowl" was the site of the famous food-fight scene in National Lampoon's Animal House.

The EMU Ballroom is a notable concert venue and has hosted shows by acts such as Grateful Dead, R.E.M., and Bob Dylan.

The EMU was the site of Eugene's University Station post office.

== Management and governance ==
The Erb Memorial Union board of directors is responsible for making general policy decisions and long-range plans for the operation of the EMU. The board allocates the EMU's multimillion-dollar budget, assigns space for student groups and advises staff in the management of the EMU. The sixteen-member board consists of twelve students (seven elected in a campus-wide election and five direct appointments from either EMU programs or the Associated Students of the University of Oregon (ASUO), three faculty members appointed by the University of Oregon president and one EMU staff member elected by their peers.

Every fiscal year, the EMU Board prepares a benchmark increase to the ASUO Senate for approval. After the benchmark process, the EMU presents its final budget to the senate, requesting a decrease, increase, or no change in incidental fees to be allocated to the EMU. If the budget request is approved, the budget must be signed by the ASUO President and then the UO President. Unlike the budget process, any general policy decisions by the EMU Board do not require senate oversight or approval.

== Renovation ==
University of Oregon officials have considered a number of projects to modernize the aging building. In the early 2000s there was a push for the building to undergo a significant deferred maintenance project. However, that proposal was scrapped after it was determined that the building's layout and size were not adequate for current enrollment numbers. Additionally, the much-criticized layout resulted in student access concerns.

Ultimately, it was decided that the building would undergo a massive renovation and expansion project. The $95 million project will renovate and modernize the 1950s wing and build a new structure on the site of the 1970s addition.

== Controversy ==
The initial renovation project called for the inclusion of a 1,200-seat concert hall. The concert hall was to be partly funded by private donations. According to a UO official, the Beall Concert Hall, which is the only concert hall on campus, is not an adequate building because it lacks the size to accommodate large shows and there are some noted concerns relating to sound efficiency.

However, student groups did not support this addition. The ASUO president criticized the commercial driven nature of the project.
