= Deady and Villard Halls, University of Oregon =

- University and Villard Halls, University of Oregon
- U.S. National Register of Historic Places
- U.S. National Historic Landmark
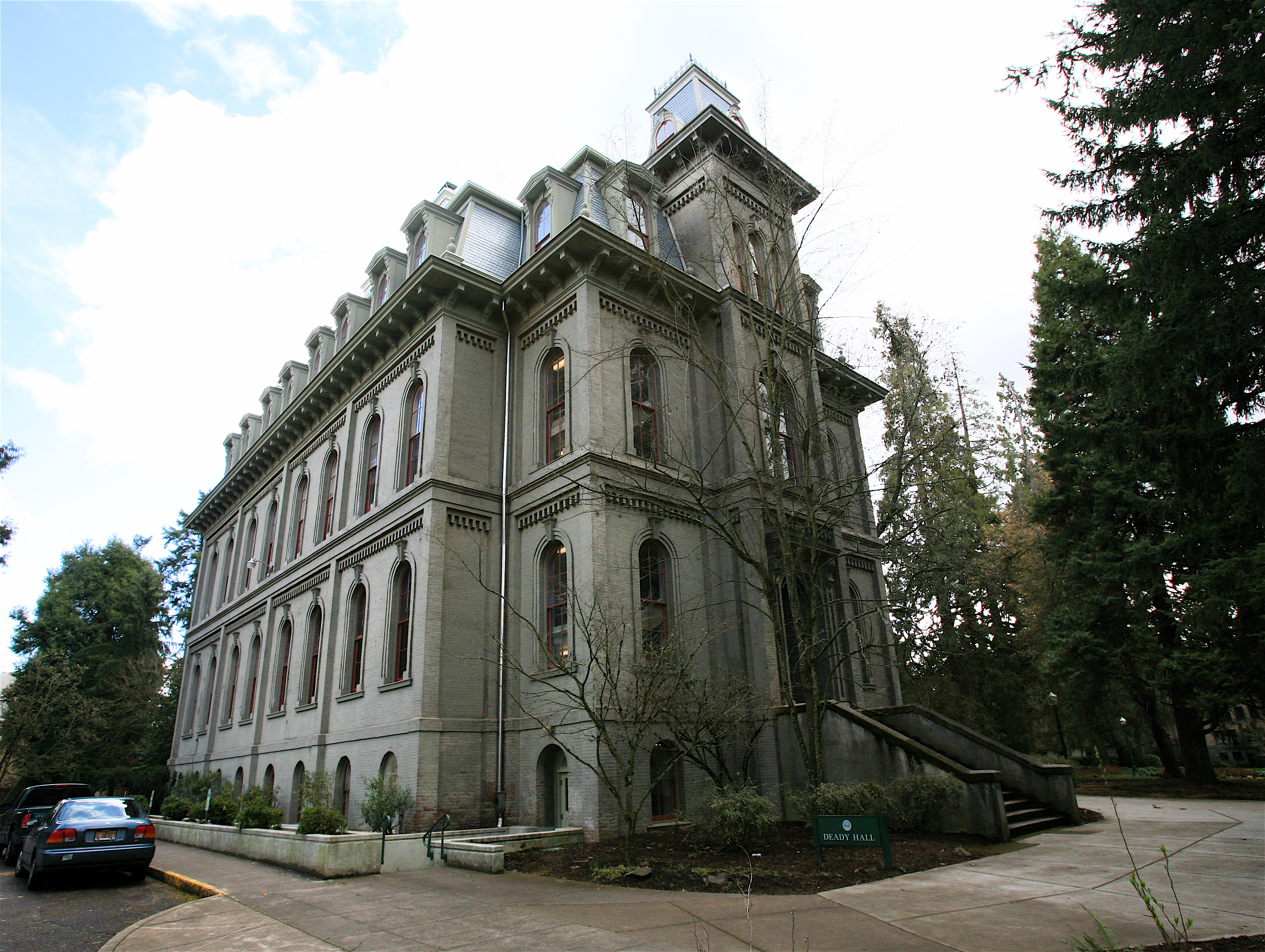
- University Hall

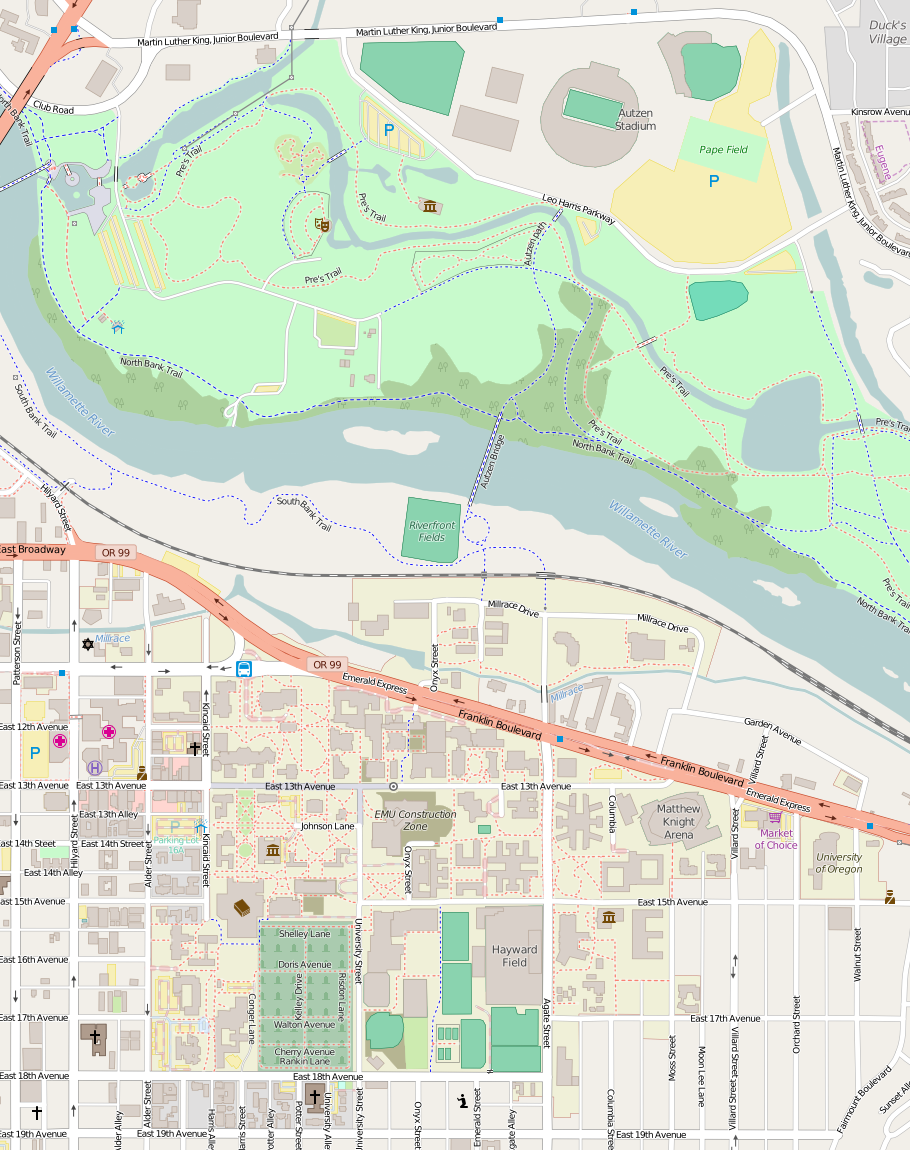
- Location within University of Oregon Campus
- Location: Eugene, Oregon
- Coordinates: 44°2′50″N 123°4′35″W
- Built: 1885
- Architect: Warren Heywood Williams; Lord Nelson Roney
- Architectural style: Second Empire
- NRHP reference No.: 72001082 (Deady Hall); 72001083 (Villard Hall)

Significant dates
- Added to NRHP: April 11, 1972
- Designated NHL: May 5, 1977

University and Villard Halls, University of Oregon are historic academic buildings on the campus the University of Oregon in Eugene, Oregon. Built in 1876 and 1886 respectively, they are among the oldest surviving academic buildings on the west coast of the United States, and are noted for their Second Empire architecture. They were designated a National Historic Landmarks as a pair in 1977.

Both buildings were extensively altered in the 20th century, with University Hall's interior entirely gutted in 1914. The exteriors, in particular wooden trim elements, suffered due to Oregon's coastal climate. They were both given historically sensitive restoration in the mid-1990s, a process in which students were given the opportunity to participate through classes organized for the purpose.

== University Hall ==
University Hall is a three-story brick building, with a mansard roof and mansarded corner towers. Its windows have rounded tops with keystones in the Italianate style, and there are rows of dentil brickwork above the second and third floors. The main cornice is studded with modillions, and the mansard roof is lined with gabled dormers. The hall was built in 1873-76 to a design by William Piper. For ten years, it was the school's only building.

Formerly known as Deady Hall, on June 24, 2020, after pressure from student-led groups, the University of Oregon's Board of Trustees announced that the name "Deady" would be removed as the name of the hall until a date when a new name can be chosen. In the interim, the hall has been named University Hall. Its previous name was named for Matthew Deady, Oregon's first federal judge. Prior to the name change, UO President Michael Schill sent a letter to the Board of Trustees recommending renaming Deady Hall because of Deady's racist views.

== Villard Hall ==
Villard Hall, built in 1886, is a more elaborate expression of Second Empire architecture. Also built out of brick, it is finished with a stucco material, and looks more like it is made of stone. It also has a mansard roof and corner towers, whose roofs are capped by iron cresting. Although its design borrows from the vocabulary used in the older building, it is considerably richer. Windows on its upper level are set in round-top openings, with flanking pilasters both within and part of the surrounding frame. The building was designed by Warren H. Williams, and is named for railroad baron Henry Villard.
