= Smeede Hotel =

- U.S. National Register of Historic Places
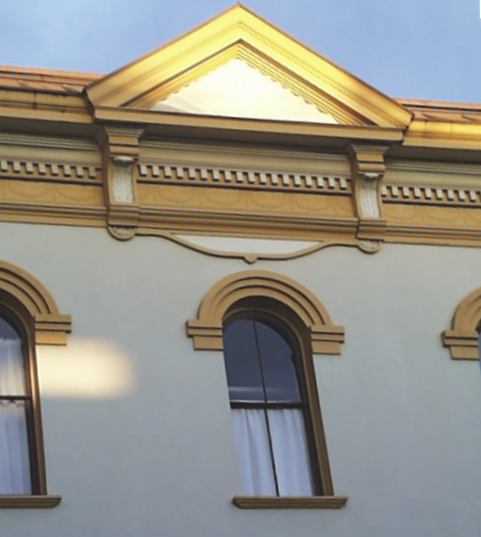
- A pediment at the Smeede Hotel in 2007

- Location within Oregon Location within the United States
- Location: 767 Willamette St., Eugene, Oregon
- Coordinates: 44°03′06″N 123°05′28″W
- Area: 0.1 acres (0.040 ha)
- Built: 1884
- Architect: Park, George H.
- Architectural style: Italianate
- NRHP reference No.: 74001691
- Added to NRHP: January 17, 1974

The Smeede Hotel, located in Eugene, Oregon, is listed on the National Register of Historic Places.

== Description and history ==
George H. Park, a local builder-contractor, began construction in the Italianate style in 1884 at the behest of Charles Baker. The hotel opened in 1885 under the name, Baker Hotel, although Baker had already sold the building to Stephen Smeed for $12,000. In 1892, Smeed improved the property and changed the name to Hotel Eugene. It was again changed to Hotel Smeede in 1907, with the extra 'e' added to the hotel name for embellishment, and in 1914 it became the Smeede Hotel.

The hotel remained in continuous operation until the early 1970s. The Eugene Renewal Agency purchased the three-story structure and began renovations in 1971 for commercial office space. In 1973 the Lane County Pioneer Museum applied to place the building on the National Register of Historic Places.

One noteworthy guest was William Jennings Bryan, in 1896, during his presidential campaign.

== See also ==
- National Register of Historic Places listings in Lane County, Oregon
