= Hatfield-Dowlin Complex =

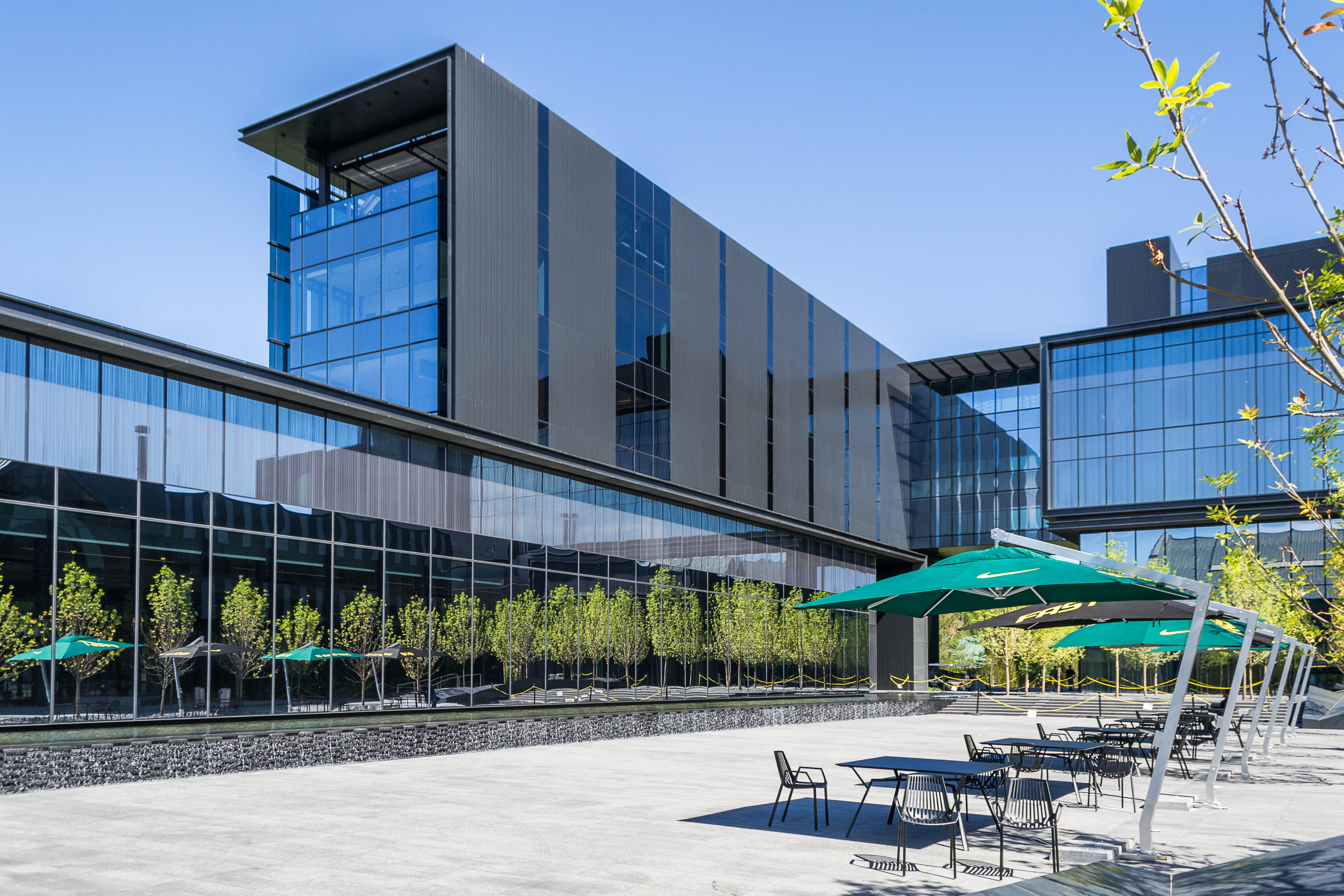
- A view inside the courtyard looking north

General information
- Location: Eugene, Oregon
- Coordinates: 44°3′33.24″N 123°4′17.24″W
- Completed: 2013
- Owner: University of Oregon

Design and construction
- Architect(s): ZGF Architects; Landscape architects - PLACE studio, LLC

The Hatfield-Dowlin Complex houses the Football Operations Center at the University of Oregon in Eugene, Oregon. Completed in 2013 with a donation provided by Phil and Penny Knight, the complex is named for Lota Hatfield, Phil Knight's mother, and Dorothie Dowlin, the mother of Penny Knight. The black granite and glass structure was designed by ZGF Architects, the same firm that designed the John E. Jaqua Center for Student Athletes. The landscape architect of record is PLACE studio. Early estimates suggested a cost of $68 million, although the Oregon Daily Emerald reported the cost at closer to $138 million.

Some features of the 145,000-square-foot complex include a 170-seat theater, a weight room, a cafeteria, a barber shop, locker rooms, saunas, and lounges. Moreover, The Hatfield-Dowlin Complex provides free dining for all student-athletes given that they make the trip to the complex.
