= John E. Jaqua Center for Student Athletes =

John E. Jaqua Academic Center for Student Athletes
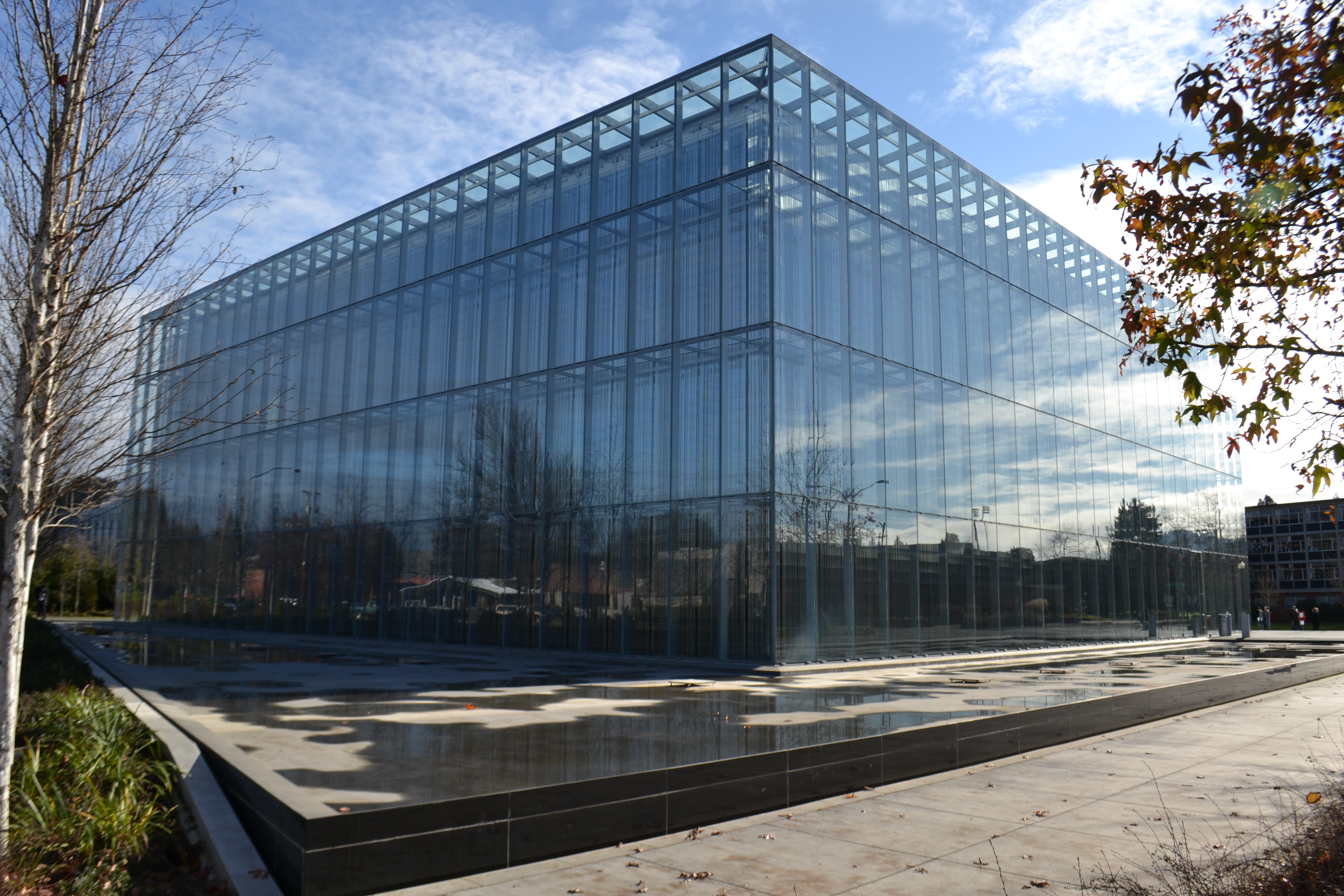
- Interactive map of the John E. Jaqua Academic Center for Student Athletes area

General information
- Location: 1615 E. 13th Avenue, Eugene, Oregon
- Coordinates: 44°2′44.89″N 123°4′9.24″W
- Completed: 2010
- Owner: University of Oregon

Design and construction
- Architect: ZGF Architects
- Main contractor: Hoffman Construction Company

The John E. Jaqua Center for Student Athletes is a learning center for University of Oregon NCAA student-athletes.

== About ==
The facility is located on the University of Oregon campus, and is within walking distance of Matthew Knight Arena. It is named for the late University of Oregon alumnus and founding board member of Nike. The center contains over 40,000 square feet of space, including a 114-seat auditorium, 54 computer stations, 35 tutor rooms, 25 faculty offices, 3 sets of Male and Female restrooms, 1 water fountain, computer laboratory, graphics laboratory, 3D teaching laboratories, a library, and a café. The center is also a place where student- athletes receive Course planning advice and Academic mentoring from their respective Academic Adviser. The John E. Jaqua Center for Student Athletes allows Oregon student athletes to facilitate their academic progress throughout college while maintaining balance with their respective sports, school and social life.

=== Design ===
The designers, ZGF Architects, received the 2011 AIA Institute Honor Award for Interior Architecture. The American Institute of Architects said, "Enlightenment in all its forms is present in this glorious project..."

== Controversy ==
The center was built during a time when new classroom and study space was in high demand. However, aside from a small cafe, lecture hall and restroom facilities on the main floor, the center is for student-athletes only. The center is jokingly referred as the jock (in the) box, The John Jaqua Center for Kids Who Can't Read Good, and other names, because it primarily serves the student-athlete population.

Furthermore, despite claims of operational self-sufficiency made by the University of Oregon Athletic Department, UO's academic side has been covering the facility's tutoring costs.
