= University Hall (University of Oregon) =

- University Hall, formerly Deady Hall
- U.S. National Register of Historic Places
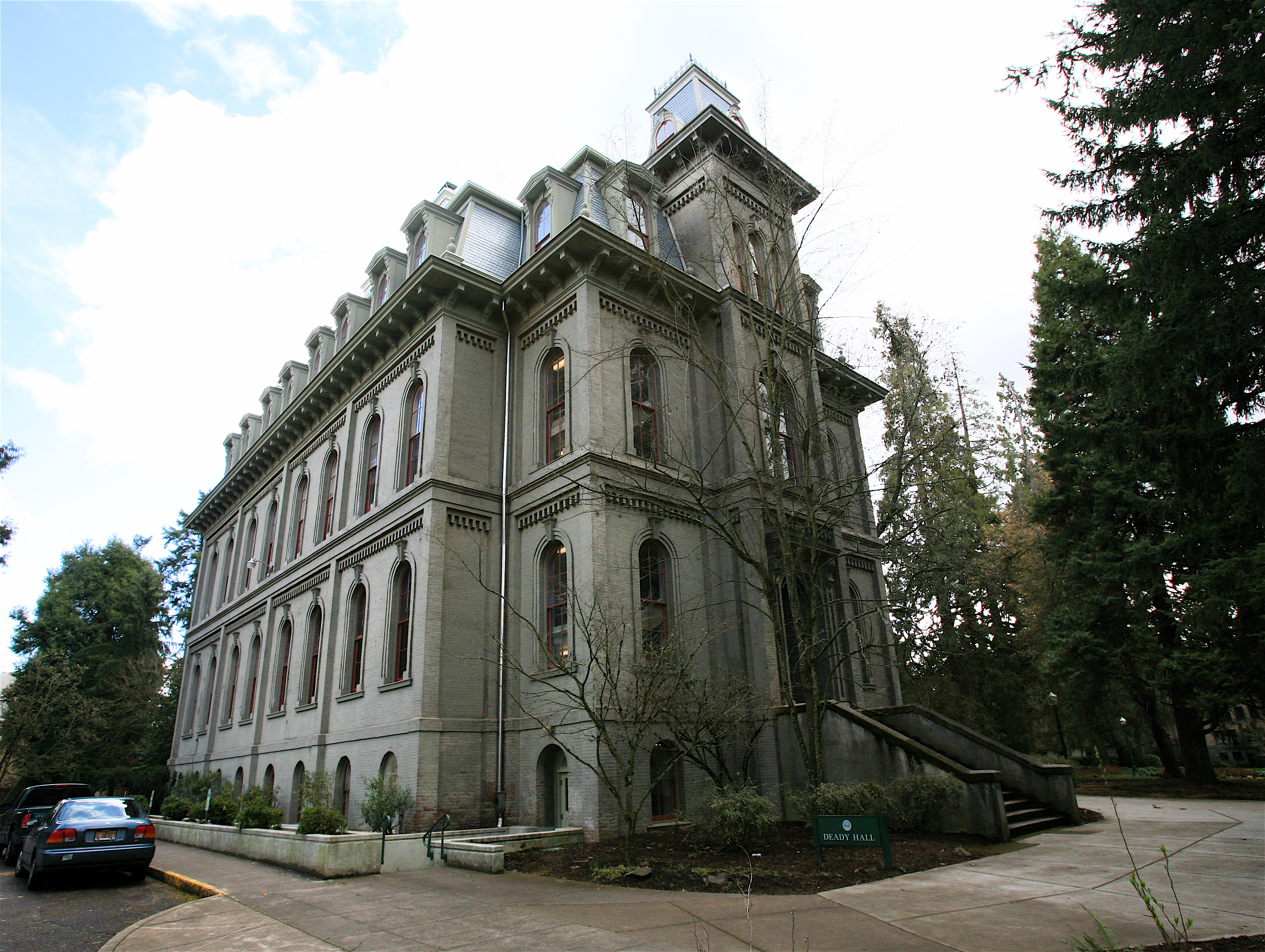

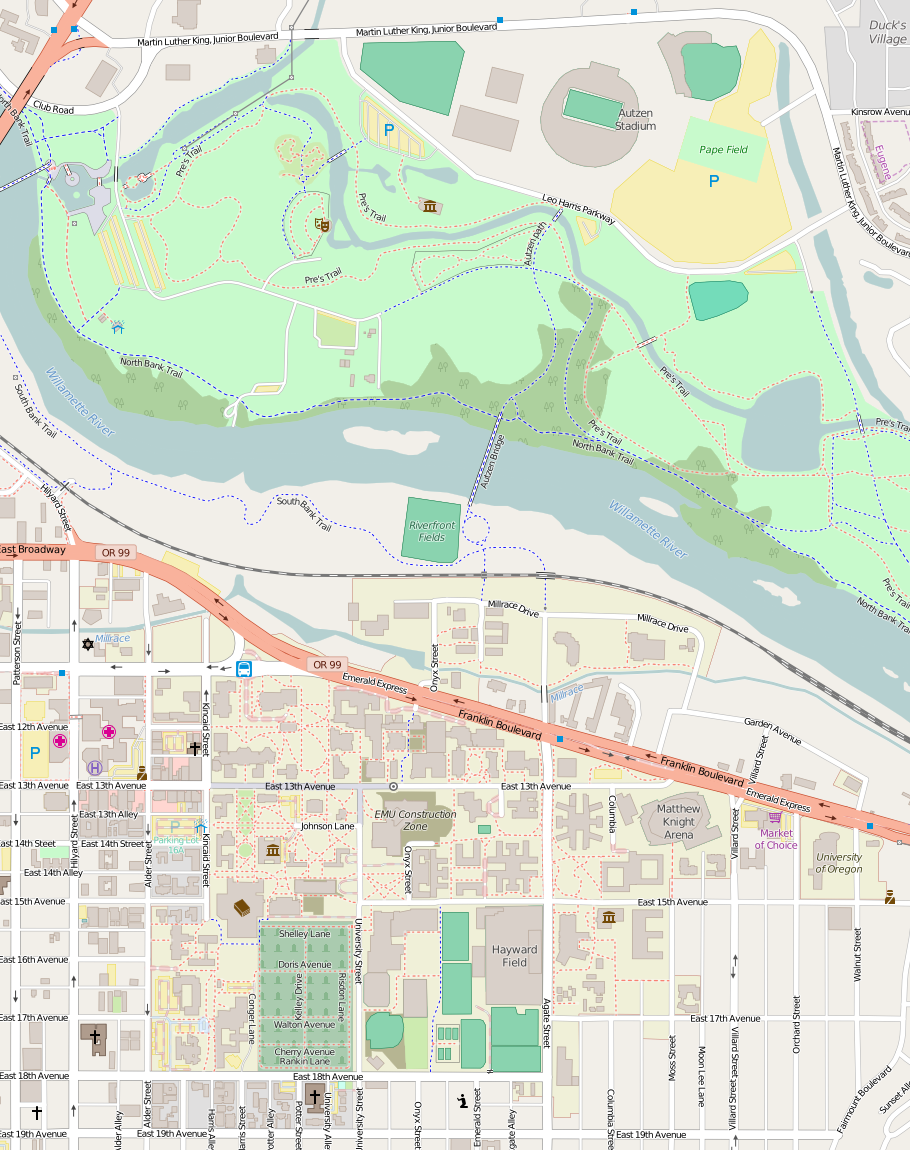
- Location within University of Oregon Campus Location within Oregon Location within the United States
- Location: Eugene, Oregon
- Coordinates: 44.04667°N 123.07643°W
- Area: 1 acre (0.40 ha)
- Built: 1873–1876
- Architect: W.W. Piper
- Architectural style: Italianate
- NRHP reference No.: 72001082
- Added to NRHP: April 11, 1972

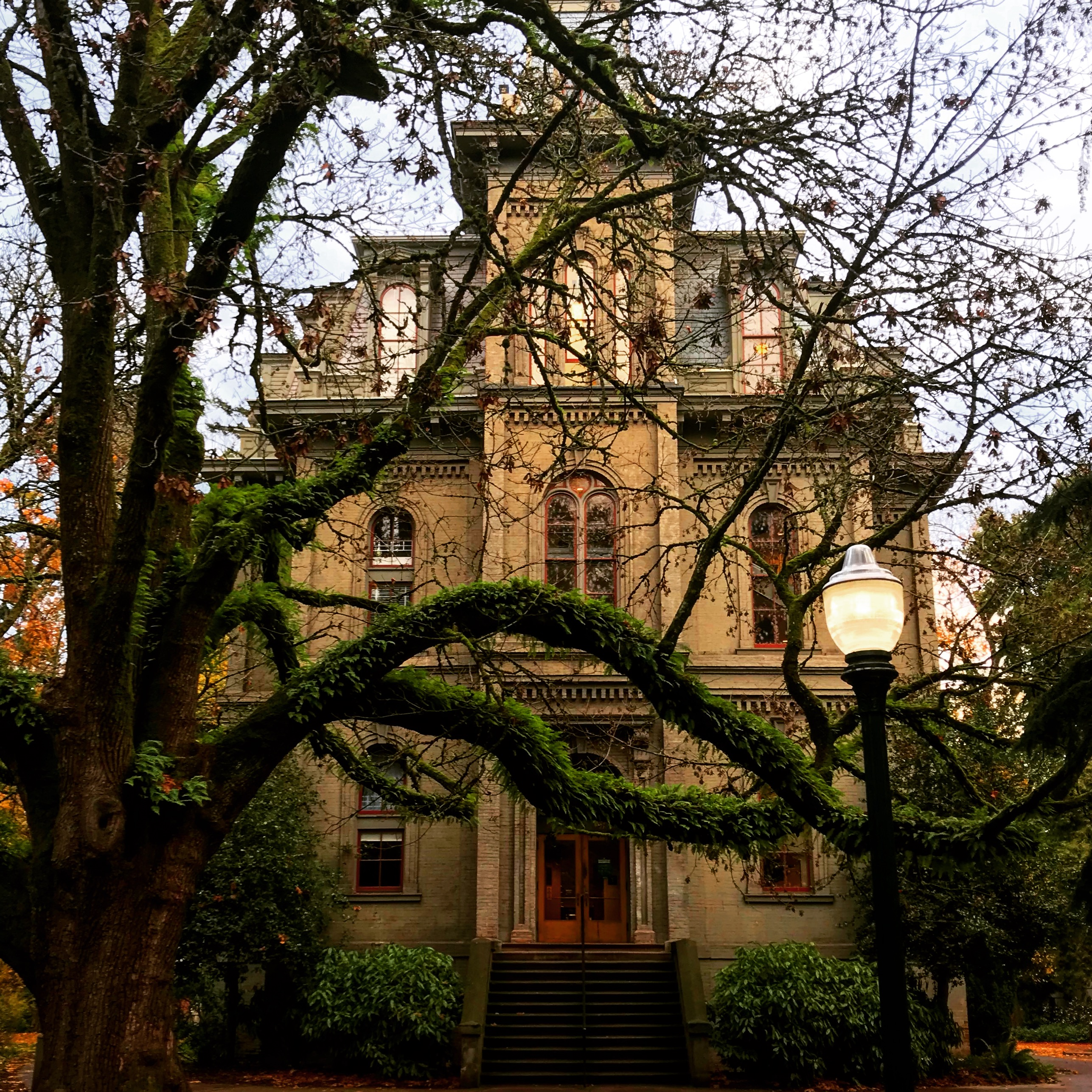

University Hall, formerly Deady Hall, is a historic building located in Eugene, Oregon, United States. It was built from 1873 to 1876 by W. H. Abrams to a design by architect William W. Piper. It was the University of Oregon's first building, and remained the university's only building for almost ten years after its construction. After the university gained other buildings, it was known simply as the "Old Building", but in 1893 it was renamed "Deady Hall" in honor of Matthew Deady, Oregon's first federal judge. Ironically, Deady believed that state universities were of little use to anybody, and in 1857, during the Oregon Constitutional Convention, Deady moved to strike the section authorizing a university from the Oregon State Constitution. His efforts were initially successful, although by the 1870s a state university had become inevitable, and the building that bears his name was constructed in spite of Deady's earlier objections. In another twist of fate, Deady was first president of the university's Board of Regents.

University Hall is variously described as simplified Italianate with Second Empire details or simply as Second Empire (though not as elaborate an example as Villard Hall).

This building was listed on National Register of Historic Places in 1972. It and nearby Villard Hall were together designated as one National Historic Landmark in 1977.

At the Oregon Constitutional Convention in 1857, Matthew Deady had advocated for discrimination towards African Americans, who were not allowed to settle in the new state. Because of these views, Deady Hall became a target of an effort to remove his name from the building. On June 10, 2020, UO President Michael Schill sent a letter to the Board of Trustees recommending renaming Deady Hall because of Deady's racist views. On June 24, 2020, the University of Oregon's Board of Trustees announced that the name "Deady" would be removed as the name of the hall until a date when a new name can be chosen. In the interim, the hall will be named "University Hall."

== See also ==
- Deady and Villard Halls, University of Oregon
