= Villard Hall =

- U.S. National Register of Historic Places
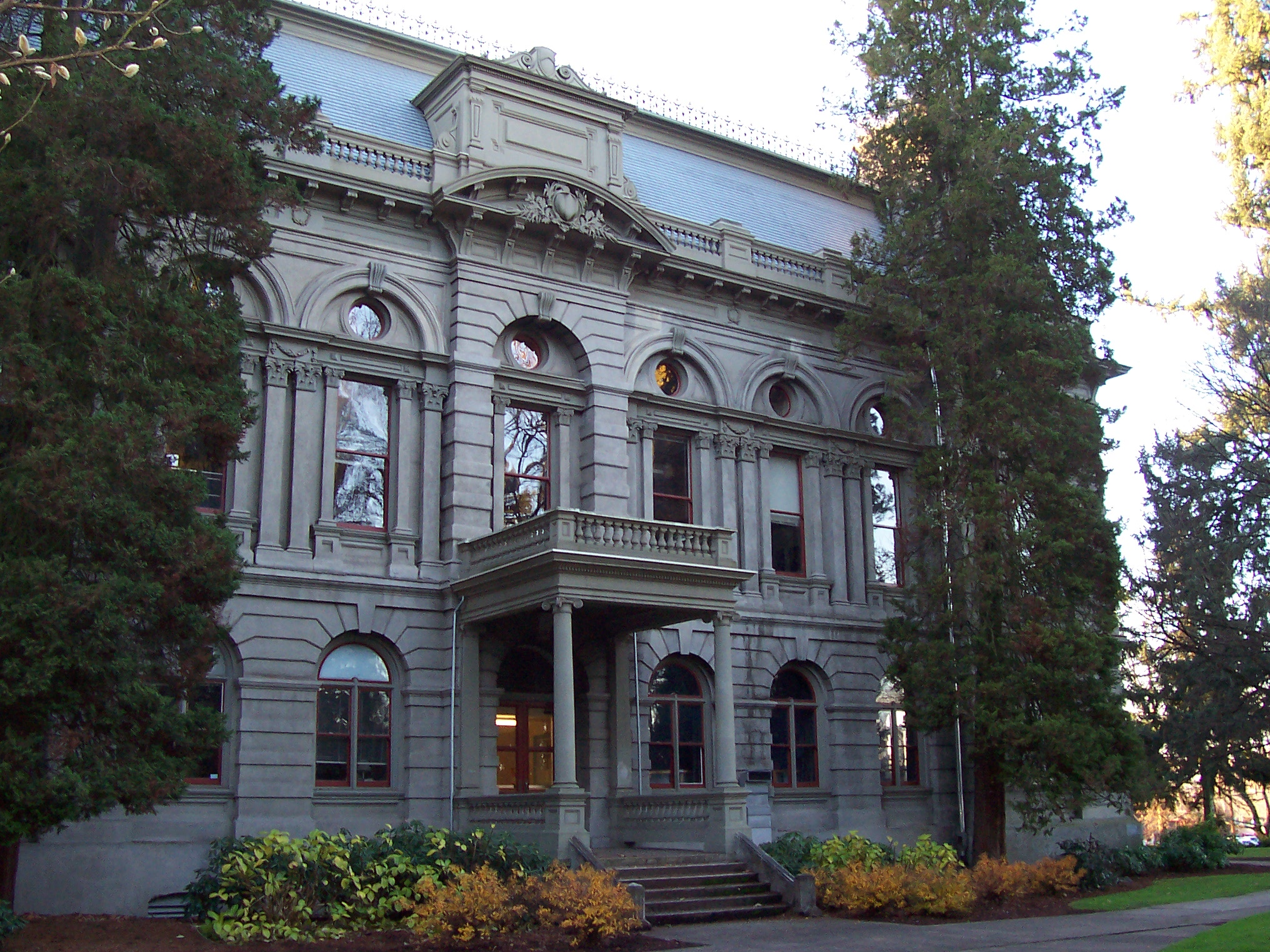

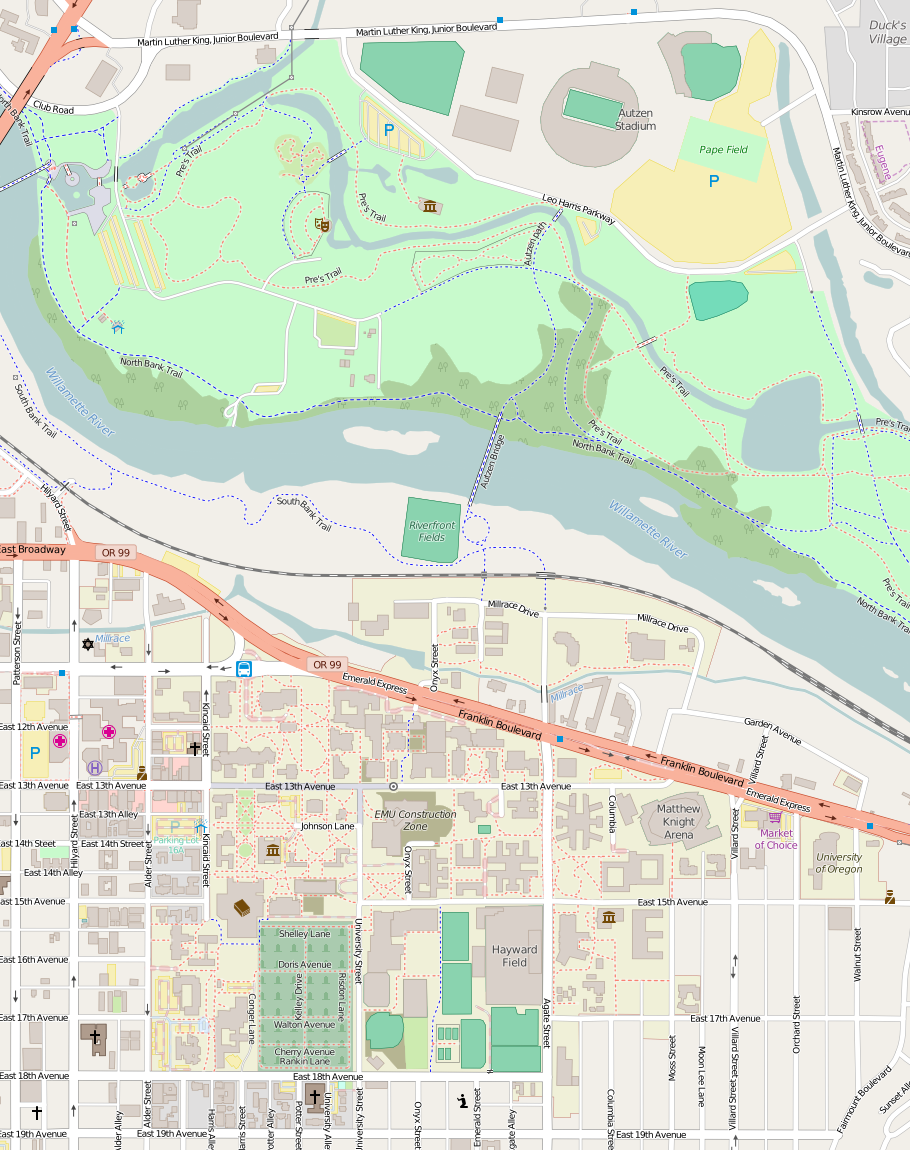
- Location within University of Oregon Campus
- Location: Eugene, Oregon
- Coordinates: 44°2′50″N 123°4′35″W
- Built: 1886
- Architect: Williams, Warren Heywood; Roney, L. N.
- Architectural style: Second Empire
- NRHP reference No.: 72001083
- Added to NRHP: April 11, 1972

Villard Hall is a historic building located in Eugene, Oregon, United States. Completed in 1886, it is the second-oldest building on the University of Oregon campus after University Hall. The Second Empire-style building was listed on National Register of Historic Places in 1972.

University Hall and Villard Hall were together designated as one U.S. National Historic Landmark in 1977.

Villard Hall was named for Henry Villard, a railroad magnate and philanthropist who was the University of Oregon's first benefactor. He provided financial aid to the university in 1886. Before its naming, Villard Hall was known as "the new building."

In 1949 a new 400 seat theater was built as an addition onto Villard Hall. Throughout the late 1950, 1960s and 1970, the studios and transmitter of KWAX were on the third floor. Also on the third floor were studios for KOAC TV, which connected to KOAC in Corvallis via a microwave link, housed in an "outhouse" on the northeast corner of the roof.

The building now houses the university's comparative literature and theater arts departments, as well as the Robinson Theater.

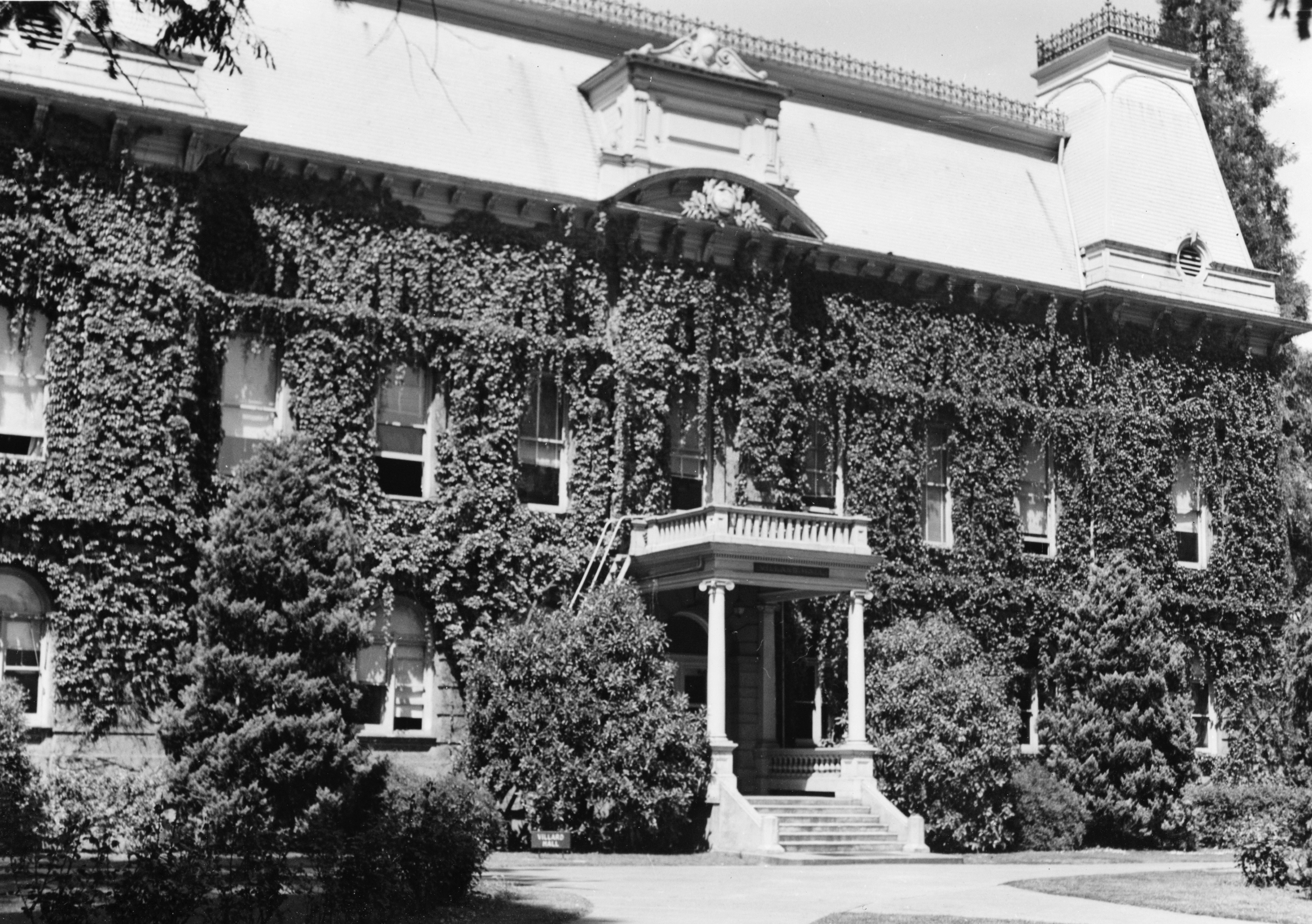
Villard Hall in 1955

== See also ==
- Building circa 1920
- Deady and Villard Halls, University of Oregon
