= List of University of Oregon buildings =

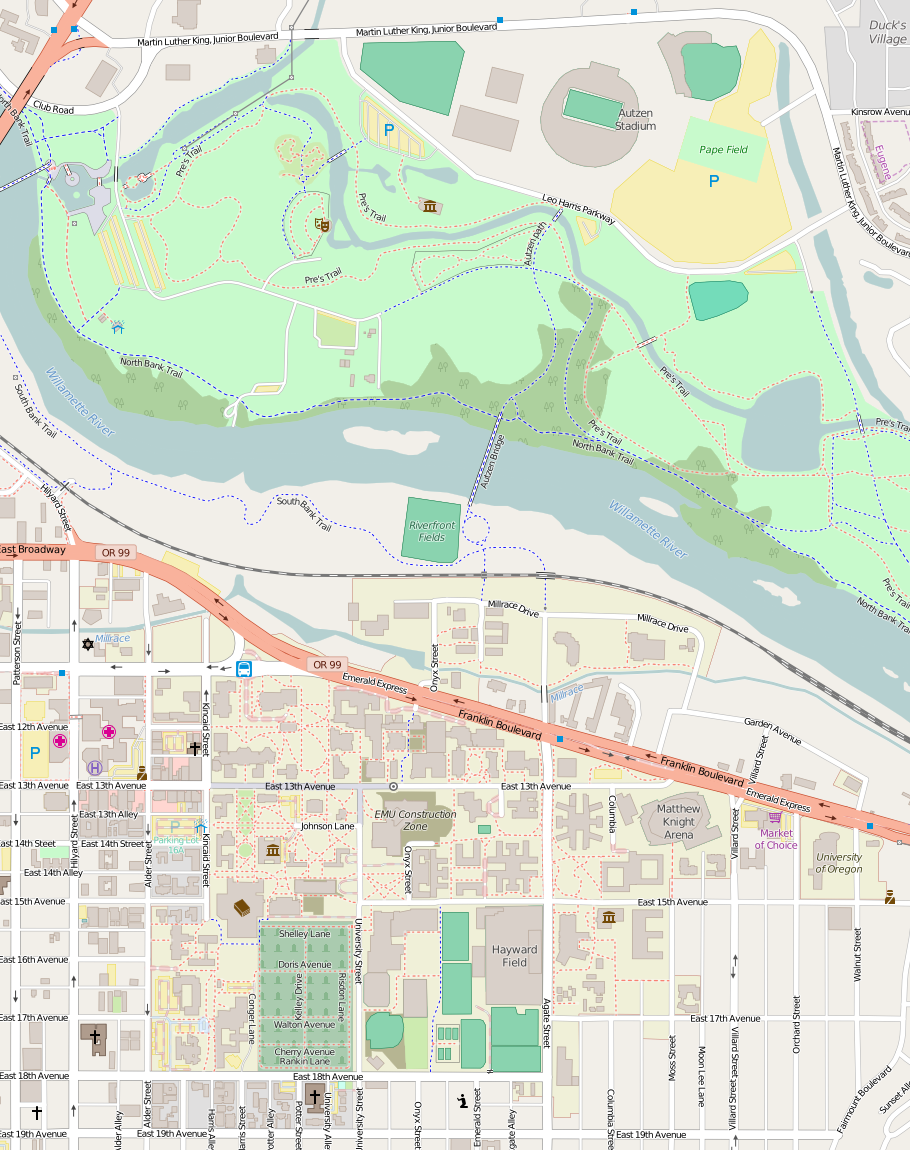
Map of the campus

University of Oregon real estate includes buildings in a variety of architectural styles and eras. Many buildings on the main campus were designed by Ellis F. Lawrence, who joined the university in 1914 as campus planner, but by 1915 he had founded the School of Architecture and had become chief architect of the university. Lawrence also held a commission to design all buildings on campus as long as he remained in charge of the School of Architecture. This commission was a source of extra income for Lawrence, and he designed buildings until his death in 1946. Some of the Lawrence buildings are listed on the National Register of Historic Places. Others are not themselves listed but are included in NRHP site surveys. The Memorial Quadrangle, for example, contains buildings listed as contributing resources in the site survey for the Knight Library. These buildings are Condon Hall, Chapman Hall, and the Jordan Schnitzer Museum of Art, although the museum is also separately listed. The Women's Memorial Quadrangle is listed on the NRHP, and it contains three more Lawrence buildings which are contributing resources, Gerlinger Hall, Hendricks Hall, and Susan Campbell Hall.

Although the Lawrence era was highly significant in defining the real estate of the University of Oregon, some buildings predated Lawrence. University Hall, for example, opened in 1876, and it was known as the "old building" when Villard Hall opened in 1886. Villard was the "new building."

The university continues to design and build, acquire and renovate, with attention to the campus planning process known as The Oregon Experiment. Buildings are seen as solutions in the pattern language of campus planning. The university adheres to the Campus Plan, a document that defines policies and processes within the context of pattern language.

The following table includes most but not all University of Oregon buildings. Bungalow houses in the area of Villard, Moss, and Columbia Streets are not included. Satellite research areas such as Pine Mountain Observatory are not included. Some off-campus buildings in which the university maintains a strategic partnership with other organizations are not included. These structures are listed in the Campus Plan mentioned above. Whenever possible, the origin of proper names is listed in the notes. When the relevant year could not be determined, 0000 is listed.

Name	Year	Location	Image	Description
Computing Center	1967	Historic Core; 44.046358°N 123.078291°W		The computing center was constructed to coordinate campus-wide information services.
University Hall	1876	Historic Core; 44.046604°N 123.076478°W		University Hall, formerly Deady Hall, was named in 1893 for Judge Matthew Deady, Oregon's first federal judge. NRHP Reference: 72001082; Part of the old campus
James F. Miller Theatre Complex	2008	Historic Core; 44.04715°N 123.076385°W		Named for University donor and patron of the arts James F. Miller. The complex includes Villard Hall and the Hope and Robinson theaters.
Villard Hall	1886	Historic Core; 44.04715°N 123.076385°W		The building was named for Henry Villard, the University's first benefactor. Villard Hall is part of the James F. Miller Theatre Complex. NRHP Reference: 72001083; Part of the old campus
Robinson Theatre	1949	Historic Core; 44.047129°N 123.077212°W		Named for Professor Emeritus Horace Robinson. Part of the James F. Miller Theatre Complex.
Fenton Hall	1906	Historic Core; 44.045752°N 123.076348°W		Originally the library and then the law school, Fenton Hall was named in 1938 after Judge William D. Fenton, an early UO benefactor. The courtroom scene from the movie National Lampoon's Animal House was filmed at Fenton Hall. Part of the old campus
Lillis Business Complex	2003	Historic Core; 44.046014°N 123.077614°W		Named for University donors Chuck and Gwen Lillis, the complex is home to the Lundquist College of Business and includes Lillis Hall, Anstett Hall, Peterson Hall, and the Chiles Business Center.
Lillis Hall	2003	Historic Core; 44.046014°N 123.077614°W		Named for University donors Charles and Gwen Lillis, Lillis Hall was constructed on the former site of Gilbert Hall and is part of the Lillis Business Complex.
Anstett Hall	1916	Historic Core; 44.045729°N 123.077356°W		Named for University donors Joseph and Hope Anstett, Anstett Hall opened in the renovated space of the former East Gilbert Hall and is part of the Lillis Business Complex.
Peterson Hall	1916	Historic Core; 44.046604°N 123.076478°W		Named for University donors Ronald and Patricia Peterson, Peterson Hall opened in the renovated space of the former West Gilbert Hall and is part of the Lillis Business Complex.
Chiles Business Center	1985	Historic Core; 44.046604°N 123.076478°W		Named for University donors Earl and Virginia Chiles, the Chiles Business Center houses a business technology center and computer labs at the Lundquist College of Business
McKenzie Hall	1970	Historic Core; 44.047036°N 123.078247°W		Originally constructed to house the new Law Center, the building was renovated in 1999 and renamed Grayson Hall, then in 2002 it was renamed McKenzie Hall and houses information services, computing labs, the Department of History, and the Department of Cinema Studies.
Chapman Hall	1939	Historic Core; 44.045266°N 123.077222°W		Named for Charles H. Chapman, president of the university from 1893 to 1896, Chapman Hall houses the Robert D. Clark Honors College. Part of the Memorial Quad, NRHP Reference: 86001224
Condon Hall	1925	Historic Core; 44.045278°N 123.077973°W		Named for Professor Thomas Condon, the University's first geology professor, Condon Hall houses the Department of Geography. Part of the Memorial Quad, NRHP Reference: 90000370
Jordan Schnitzer Museum of Art	1933	Historic Core; 44.044314°N 123.077255°W		Named for University donor Jordan Schnitzer, the museum received its current name after a major renovation in 2005. Part of the Memorial Quad, NRHP Reference: 90000370; NRHP Reference: 86001224
Knight Library	1937	Historic Core; 44.043639°N 123.077625°W		Named for University donor Phil Knight, the library received its current name after a major renovation in 1994. The library is part of the Memorial Quad, honoring the athletes of the university (1921), students who fought in the Spanish–American War and World War I (1932), and senior class president Robert Bailey who drowned in the mill race (1940). Part of the Memorial Quad, NRHP Reference: 90000370
Prince Lucien Campbell Hall	1968	Historic Core; 44.044283°N 123.078317°W		Named for university president Prince Lucien Campbell, PLC is home to many departments and a large auditorium. The Oregon Companion described PLC as "...a pugnaciously ugly eight-story semi-skyscraper office building" and adds, "He deserved better." Part of the Memorial Quad
Gerlinger Hall	1921	Historic Core; 44.043589°N 123.075372°W		Originally Woman's Memorial Hall, the building was renamed in 1929 for Irene Hazard Gerlinger, first woman regent and fundraising donor. Part of Women's Memorial Quadrangle, NRHP Reference: 92001320
Gerlinger Annex	1969	Historic Core; 44.043365°N 123.076622°W		Gerlinger Annex houses the department of dance. It was named for Irene Hazard Gerlinger, first woman regent and fundraising donor. Part of Women's Memorial Quadrangle
Hendricks Hall	1918	Historic Core; 44.044183°N 123.075136°W		Named for active donor Thomas G. Hendricks and originally a women's dorm, the building is now home to the Career Center, the Department of Women's and Gender Studies, the Department of Planning, Public Policy and Management, the Center for the Study of Women in Society and the Center for Latino/a and Latin American Studies. Part of Women's Memorial Quadrangle, NRHP Reference: 92001320
Susan Campbell Hall	1921	Historic Core; 44.044106°N 123.076396°W		Named for Susan Campbell, wife of university president Prince Lucien Campbell, Susan Campbell Hall was originally a women's dorm Part of Women's Memorial Quadrangle, NRHP Reference: 92001320
Clinical Services Building	1970	Southwest Campus; 44.040519°N 123.079373°W		The Clinical Services Building is part of the College of Education
Alder Building	1921	Southwest Campus; 44.043103°N 123.079819°W		Named for nearby Alder Street, Alder Building houses the Department of Ethnic Studies in the former headquarters building for Greek-lettered social clubs
Lorry I. Lokey Education Building	1921	Southwest Campus; 44.042602°N 123.079422°W		An addition to the original 1921 construction was completed in 1980 and is the university's first pattern language building. The complex was renamed for donor Lorry Lokey in 2007.
HEDCO Education Building	2009	Southwest Campus; 44.041565°N 123.078885°W		Named for donor foundation HEDCO
DeBusk Memorial Center	1923	Southwest Campus; 44.041773°N 123.078322°W		Named for Burchard Woodson DeBusk, professor of education, the DeBusk Center is now part of the Lokey Education Building.
Education Annex	1923	Southwest Campus; 44.041773°N 123.078322°W		Original construction was behind Johnson Hall, the building was moved to its present location in 1979
MarAbel B. Frohnmayer Music Building	1924	Southwest Campus; 44.040724°N 123.078365°W		Home of the School of Music and Dance, the building was renamed in 2005 for the mother of former university president David B. Frohnmayer
Beall Concert Hall	1924	Southwest Campus; 44.041075°N 123.078349°W		The concert hall was constructed as part of the adjacent music building and named in 1973 for donor Robert Vinton Beall
Allen Hall	1953	Historic Core; 44.046319°N 123.075066°W		Named for Eric Allen, first dean of the School of Journalism.
Collier House	1886	Historic Core; 44.045004°N 123.075082°W		Originally the home of George Collier, professor of physics and chemistry, Collier house has been a campus building since 1896.
Erb Memorial Union	1950	Northeast Central Campus; 44.04473°N 123.073853°W		The student union building, named for Donald Erb, seventh president of the university. Erb Memorial Union commemorates members of the university community who served during World War II.
Earl Complex	1955	Northeast Central Campus; 44.04387°N 123.072647°W		Named for Virgil D. Earl, former director of athletics and the person who hired Bill Bowerman, the Earl Complex includes residence halls named for former faculty: McClure, Morton, Sheldon, Stafford, and Young.
Carson Hall	1949	Northeast Central Campus; 44.04512°N 123.07167°W		Named for Luella Clay Carson, professor of English and dean of women, Carson is a residence hall.
Walton Complex	1950	Northeast Central Campus; 44.043967°N 123.070603°W		Named for Judge Joshua J. Walton, credited with bringing the University of Oregon to Eugene, the Walton Complex includes residence halls Adams, Clark, DeCou, Douglass, Dyment, Hawthorne, McAlister, Schafer, Smith, and Sweetser.
Living Learning Center	2006	Northeast Central Campus; 44.043855°N 123.071751°W		North and south residence halls are part of the Living Learning Center.
Friendly Hall	1893	Historic Core; 44.045737°N 123.075119°W		Named for Samson H. Friendly, an early donor and member of the original board of regents, Friendly Hall was constructed as a coed dorm and dining facility. In 1928 the building was converted to classrooms and offices.
Johnson Hall	1915	Historic Core; 44.045178°N 123.075779°W		The Administration Building was renamed in 1918 for John Wesley Johnson, first president of the university. NRHP Reference: 85001351
Lawrence Hall	1914	Historic Core; 44.047113°N 123.075034°W		Home of the School of Architecture, Lawrence Hall is an amalgamation of buildings and renovations near and adjacent to the 1901 Mechanical Hall. It was named for Ellis F. Lawrence, noted architect and founding dean of the school of architecture, in 1957.
Straub Hall	1928	Northeast Central Campus; 44.04384°N 123.073172°W		Originally a men's dormitory, the building was named in 1933 for John Straub, dean of men and professor of Greek.
Agate Hall	1924	East Campus; 44.04018°N 123.069337°W		Originally Roosevelt Junior High School, the building was renamed Condon Elementary School in 1950, and when acquired by the university in 1984 it became Agate Hall, named for nearby Agate Street.
Agate House	1924	East Campus; 44.039914°N 123.068929°W		Agate House was named for nearby Agate Hall when the university acquired the property in 1984. A 1925 bungalo, the house had been owned by the Eugene School District and used for classroom space.
William W. Knight Law Center	1999	East Campus; 44.042613°N 123.069315°W		Named for publishing executive Bill Knight, the building is home to the School of Law.
Many Nations Longhouse	2005	East Campus; 44.042162°N 123.068301°W		The longhouse reflects the university's Native American initiative, and all nine federally recognized tribes in Oregon participated in the dedication.
Oregon Hall	1974	Northeast Campus; 44.045891°N 123.070275°W		Oregon Hall is home to the Registrar and other administrative services
Student Health Center	1966	Northeast Central Campus; 44.045351°N 123.070243°W		The health center provides outpatient services to registered students
Museum of Natural and Cultural History	1987	East Campus; 44.04296°N 123.068323°W		The museum offers a variety of cultural and geologic exhibits
Lorry I. Lokey Science Complex	2006	Northeast Campus; 44.046253°N 123.072657°W		The Science Complex is named for university donor Lorry I. Lokey and includes 12 buildings housing various laboratories, classrooms, and departments of the physical sciences.
Allan Price Science Commons and Research Library	2016	Northeast Campus; 44.046352°N 123.073021°W		Part of the Lokey Science Complex, the building was renamed after an extensive renovation in 2016 for Allan Price, a former UO Vice President.
Cascade Hall	1946	Northeast Campus; 44.04628°N 123.073639°W		Part of the Lokey Science Complex, the building formally housed the natural history museum
Cascade Annex	1946	Northeast Campus; 44.046766°N 123.073628°W		Part of the Lokey Science Complex, the building formally housed the natural history museum
Columbia Hall	1960	Northeast Campus; 44.045714°N 123.07425°W		Part of the Lokey Science Complex, constructed on the former site of the men's gymnasium.
Deschutes Hall	1990	Northeast Campus; 44.045756°N 123.071118°W		Part of the Lokey Science Complex, Deschutes Hall takes a name given by French-Canadian trappers to the Deschutes River, important to Native American livelihood. The building is home to the Department of Computer and Information Science.
Huestis Hall	1973	Northeast Campus; 44.045833°N 123.072019°W		Part of the Lokey Science Complex. Huestis Hall was originally named Science III. In 1986 it was renamed for Ralph Huestis, professor of biology.
Klamath Hall	1967	Northeast Campus; 44.046304°N 123.073634°W		Part of the Lokey Science Complex. Originally named Science II, the building is home to the departments of biology and chemistry and was renamed in 1990 for the Klamath people.
Onyx Bridge	1962	Northeast Campus; 44.046612°N 123.073371°W		Part of the Lokey Science Complex. The building is named for nearby Onyx Street over which the building was constructed.
Pacific Hall	1952	Northeast Campus; 44.046496°N 123.074234°W		Part of the Lokey Science Complex. The building was originally named Science I but renamed in 1990, sometime subsequent to Magellan's naming of the "peaceful sea."
Streisinger Hall	1990	Northeast Campus; 44.046446°N 123.071944°W		Part of the Lokey Science Complex. Named for George Streisinger, professor of molecular biology. Wife Lotte Streisinger founded the Eugene Saturday Market.
Willamette Hall	1990	Northeast Campus; 44.045914°N 123.072781°W		Part of the Lokey Science Complex and home to the Department of Physics. Whilamut is a Kalapuya word meaning, "Where the river ripples and runs fast."
Robert and Beverly Lewis Integrative Science Building	2012	Northeast Campus; 44.046411°N 123.071279°W		Part of the Lokey Science Complex and named for donors Robert and Beverly Lewis.
Volcanology	1936	Northeast Campus; 44.045756°N 123.073725°W		Part of the Lokey Science Complex, originally the building was the infirmary. A physician's apartment was added on the roof in 1951, and the building was retasked and the name changed in 1968, reflecting the importance of the then-new Center for Volcanology.
Riverfront Research Park	1992	Riverfront Area; 44.048274°N 123.068189°W		The Riverfront Research Park is a strategic partnership between the university and various high-tech and research-based companies. Over 70 tenant companies and organizations have located in the park in privately owned buildings on land owned by the State of Oregon.
Wilkinson House	0000	Riverfront Area; 44.048316°N 123.072378°W		Named in 1974 for Jack Wilkinson, professor of art, the house provides office and classroom space.
Millrace I	1986	Riverfront Area; 44.048386°N 123.071933°W		Named for the nearby Millrace, Millrace I is an office area and studio space for art students.
Millrace II	1986	Riverfront Area; 44.048081°N 123.071874°W		Named for the nearby Millrace, Millrace II is an office area and studio space for art students.
Millrace III	0000	Riverfront Area; 44.048328°N 123.071574°W		Named for the nearby Millrace, Millrace III is an office area and studio space for art students.
Millrace IV	0000	Riverfront Area; 44.048328°N 123.071574°W		Named for the nearby Millrace, Millrace III is an office area and studio space for art students.
Fine Arts Studios A, B, C, D	0000	Riverfront Area; 44.048536°N 123.071161°W		Studio and teaching space for art students.
Urban Farm	1986	Riverfront Area; 44.047854°N 123.070973°W		An organic and sustainable farm where students learn to grow their own food
Zebrafish International Resource Center	2000	Riverfront Area; 44.047854°N 123.070973°W		A facility for researching zebrafish genetics and pathologies that also provides animal specimens to the research community.
Central Power Plant	1950	Riverfront Area; 44.048486°N 123.074036°W		The Central Power Plant delivers electricity, water, steam, compressed air, and natural gas to campus buildings.
Campus Operations	0000	Riverfront Area; 44.048748°N 123.073226°W		Campus Operations buildings include departments of Facilities Services, Custodial Services, Utilities Services, and Capital Construction
Franklin Building	2012	Riverfront Area; 44.046477°N 123.06762°W		Named for nearby Franklin Boulevard, the Franklin Building is the temporary home of the Department of Psychology.
Rainier Building	0000	Riverfront Area; 44.045511°N 123.061593°W		University Telecommunications Services are headquartered at the Rainier Building
John E. Jaqua Center for Student Athletes	2010	East Campus; 44.045787°N 123.069144°W		Named for Nike board member John Jaqua, the building is a study center for student athletes.
Cheryl Ramberg Ford and Allyn Ford Alumni Center	2011	East Campus; 44.045116°N 123.067609°W		Named for donors Cheryl and Allyn Ford.
Matthew Knight Arena	2011	East Campus; 44.044946°N 123.066236°W		Named for Matthew Knight, son of donor Phil Knight, the arena is a multi-purpose venue and home to Oregon Ducks basketball teams.
East Campus Graduate Village	2001	East Campus; 44.043967°N 123.065525°W		A residence hall for graduate students.
Bean Complex	1963	East Campus; 44.043793°N 123.067518°W		Named for Robert S. Bean, Chief Justice of the Oregon Supreme Court, the complex includes residence halls named for former faculty, Caswell, DeBusk, Thornton, Willcox, Moore, Parsons, Ganoe, and Henderson.
Hamilton Complex	1962	East Campus; 44.044825°N 123.068861°W		Named for Judge James Hamilton, the complex includes residence halls named for former faculty, Burgess, Collier, Cedar, Robbins, Spiller, Tingle, McClain, Cloran, Boynton, and Watson.
Global Scholars Hall	2012	East Campus; 44.042714°N 123.067255°W		Global Scholars Hall is an undergraduate residence hall.
Moss Street Children's Center	2012	East Campus; 44.041289°N 123.067083°W		The center offers childcare for the university community.
Vivian Olum Child Development Center	2000	East Campus; 44.041688°N 123.068419°W		Named for Vivian Olum, professor of counseling psychology and wife of university president Paul Olum, the center specializes in child development.
High School Equivalency Center	1967	East Campus; 44.041264°N 123.069401°W		The center helps migratory and seasonal farm workers obtain an equivalency diploma.
Labor Education and Resource Center	1977	East Campus; 44.04163°N 123.067255°W		The center offers training in labor related issues.
Military Science Building	0000	East Campus; 44.041507°N 123.069376°W		The National Defense Act of 1916 established military training at the University of Oregon.
McArthur Court	1926	Southeast Campus; 44.041649°N 123.074127°W		Named for Clifton N. McArthur, first student body president, Mac Court was replaced by Matthew Knight Arena in 2011. In 2001, The Sporting News named Mac Court the "best gym in America," and it was one of Sports Illustrated's 1995 twelve toughest places to play in college basketball.
Esslinger Hall	1936	Southeast Campus; 44.042559°N 123.074143°W		The Physical Education Building was named for Arther A. Esslinger, dean of health, physical education, and recreation, in 1975.
Student Recreation Center	1999	Southeast Campus; 44.042972°N 123.073247°W		The center includes strength and fitness training areas.
Bowerman Family Building	1991	Southeast Campus; 44.043099°N 123.071386°W		Named for donors who represent the family of Bill Bowerman, the building is home to the International Institute for Sport and Human Performance
Hayward Field	1919	Southeast Campus; 44.042343°N 123.070833°W		Named for track coach Bill Hayward, the original plan was for a football field, but a cinder track was added in 1921. The field became a track-only venue when Autzen Stadium was constructed in 1967.
Outdoor Program Barn	1991	Southeast Campus; 44.040277°N 123.074154°W		The outdoor program began in 1967, and the barn was constructed to house the 24-year accumulation of gear.
Howe Field	1936	Southeast Campus; 44.040967°N 123.074138°W		Named for Herbert Crombie Howe, a professor of English and advisor to the athletic department, the field was designed for baseball but converted to softball in 1987.
Agate Apartments	0000	Southeast Campus; 44.039748°N 123.070233°W		Named for nearby Agate Street, the apartments are part of student family housing.
Autzen Stadium	1967	Autzen Stadium Complex; 44.057747°N 123.068774°W		Named for the Autzen Foundation and donor Thomas E. Autzen, the stadium is home to the Oregon Ducks football team.
PK Park	2009	Autzen Stadium Complex; 44.059474°N 123.066156°W		Named for fundraiser and former athletic director Pat Kilkenny, the park is home to the Oregon Ducks baseball team and the minor league Eugene Emeralds.
Moshofsky Sports Center	1998	Autzen Stadium Complex; 44.057939°N 123.071296°W		Named for donors Ed and Elaine Moshofsky, the center is an indoor sports practice facility.
Casanova Center	1991	Autzen Stadium Complex; 44.058749°N 123.070909°W		Named for athletic director Len Casanova, the center contains skyboxes, training, and office space.
Hatfield-Dowlin Complex	2013	Autzen Stadium Complex; 44.059312°N 123.071328°W		Named for the maternal families of Phil and Penny Knight, the complex includes training and office space.
Romania Building	2005	Off Campus; 44.044333°N 123.062358°W		The Coca-Cola Bottling Company of Eugene operated from this site in 1947, and the Coca-Cola warehouse was constructed in 1949. In 1960, Chevrolet dealer Lew Williams built a Googie style showroom adjacent to the warehouse. Joe Romania purchased the dealership in 1969, and in 1988 received the University of Oregon Pioneer Award. His son, Steve Romania, sold the property to the university in 2005. Since that time, the building has again been used as a warehouse, and the large, Googie windows have been boarded. The building is named for the Romania family. NRHP Reference: 11000329
UO Police East Building	2011	Off Campus; 44.043577°N 123.060877°W		Headquarters of the university police department
Parking and Transportation Building	2013	Off Campus; 44.044391°N 123.061178°W		Originally the 1960s-era Oregon State Department of Motor Vehicles Eugene office, the building was acquired by the university and renovated.
UO Annex	0000	Off Campus; 44.046448°N 123.079065°W		Office and storage space
Peacehealth North	0000	Off Campus; 44.046766°N 123.082487°W		Administrative office space
Riley Hall	0000	Off Campus; 44.047528°N 123.083222°W		A former dorm at Northwest Christian University, Riley was purchased by the University of Oregon as a residence hall.
Barnhart Hall	1966	Off Campus; 44.048935°N 123.084019°W		Originally the privately owned College Inn, the building became university property in 1975 and was renamed University Inn. It was later renamed for H. Phil Barnhart, director of university housing, in 2001.
Center for Medical Education and Research	0000	Off Campus; 44.046766°N 123.082487°W		The center provides support and guidance to students at Oregon Health & Science University.
Center for Advancement of Sustainable Living	2011	East Campus; 44.039995°N 123.066128°W		The Center for the Advancement of Sustainable Living strives to inspire ecologically and socially conscious living practices through experiential learning.
McMorran House	1925	Off Campus; 44.036681°N 123.067354°W		Named for George McMorran, the original owner, the house was purchased by the university in 1941 as the official residence of the university president.
White Stag Block	1888	Off Campus; 45.523646°N 122.670954°W		A campus named for the White Stag Building, also known as the Hirsch-Weis building in Portland, Oregon, the White Stag Block is home to the Portland campus of the University of Oregon. In 2006 the university purchased, renovated, and combined three buildings, the Bickel Block Building (1888), the Skidmore Block Building (1889), and the White Stag Building (1907). Old Town Historic District NRHP Reference: 75001597
KWAX	1951	Off Campus; 44.060773°N 123.078171°W		KWAX is a listener-supported FM radio broadcast station owned by the university.
Kalapuya Ilihi	2017	East Campus 44°02'29.6"N 123°04'02.6"W		Kalapuya Ilihi is an undergraduate residence hall. The hall is named in honor of the Kalapuya, the indigenous people of the Willamette Valley.

== See also ==
- List of Marylhurst University buildings
- List of Portland State University buildings
- List of Reed College buildings
- List of University of Portland buildings
- List of Willamette University buildings
