= List of Portland State University buildings =

List of buildings on the Portland State University campus in Portland, Oregon, U.S.

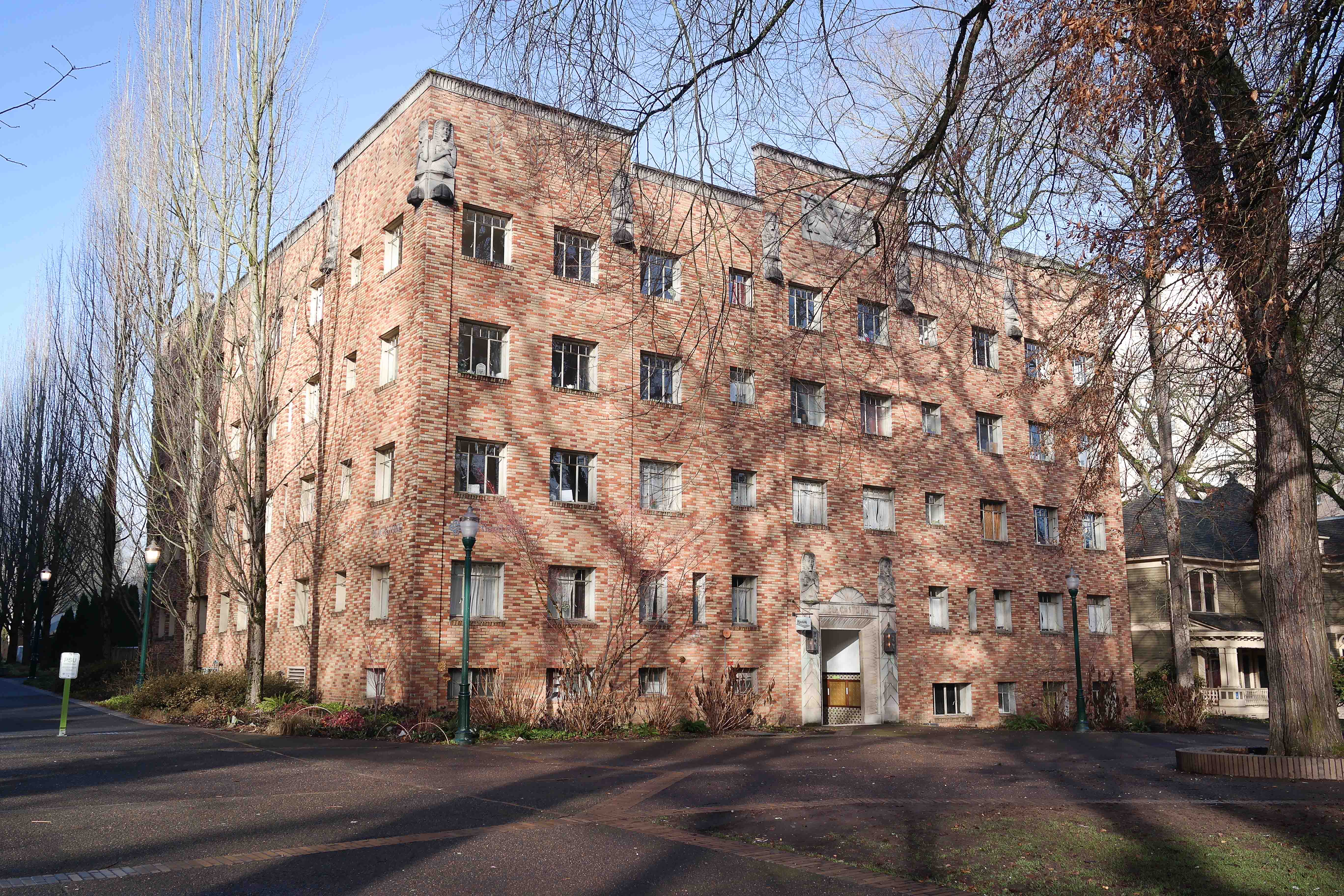
Blackstone Hall, 2014

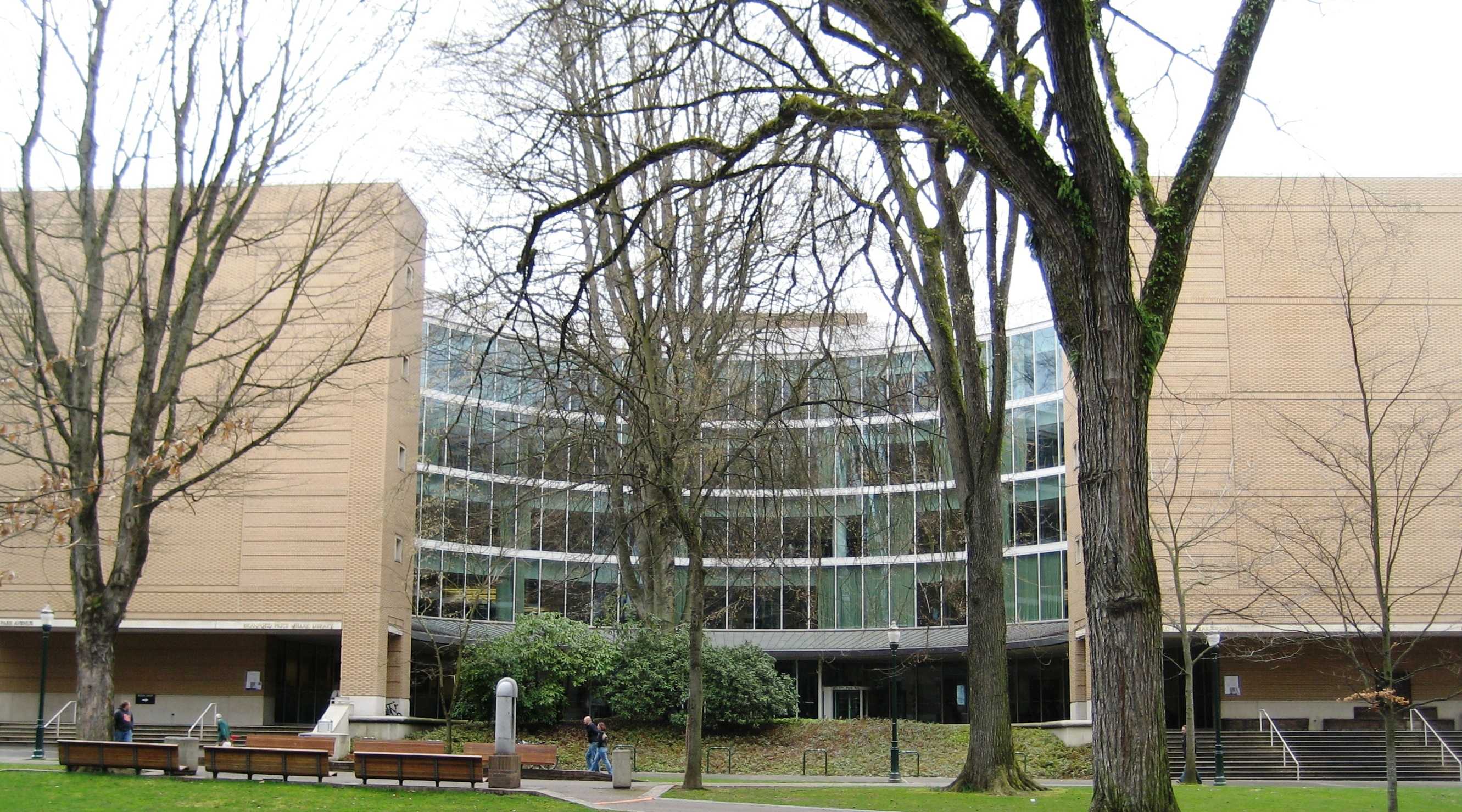
Branford Price Millar Library in 2009

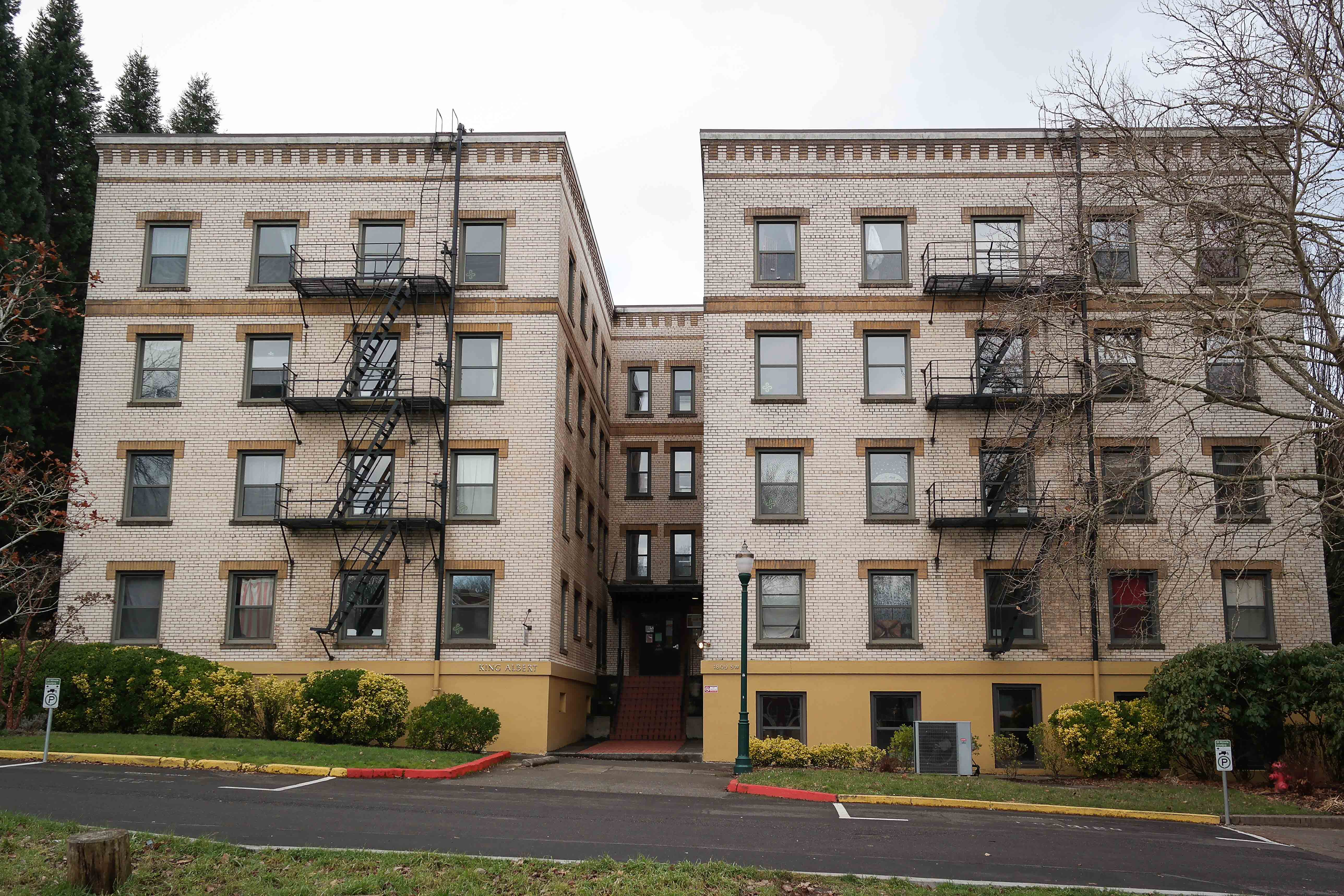
King Albert Hall

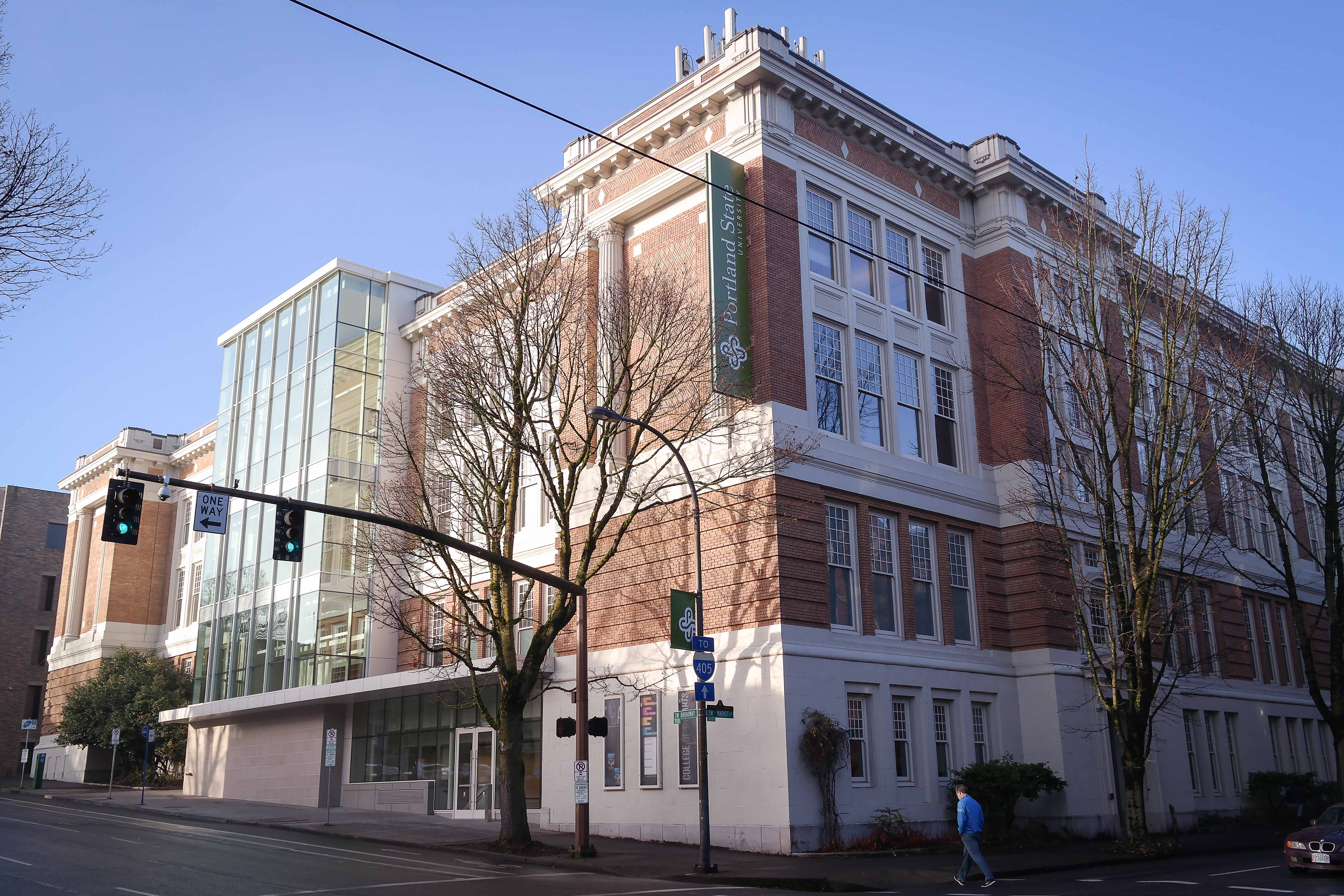
Lincoln Hall, 2014

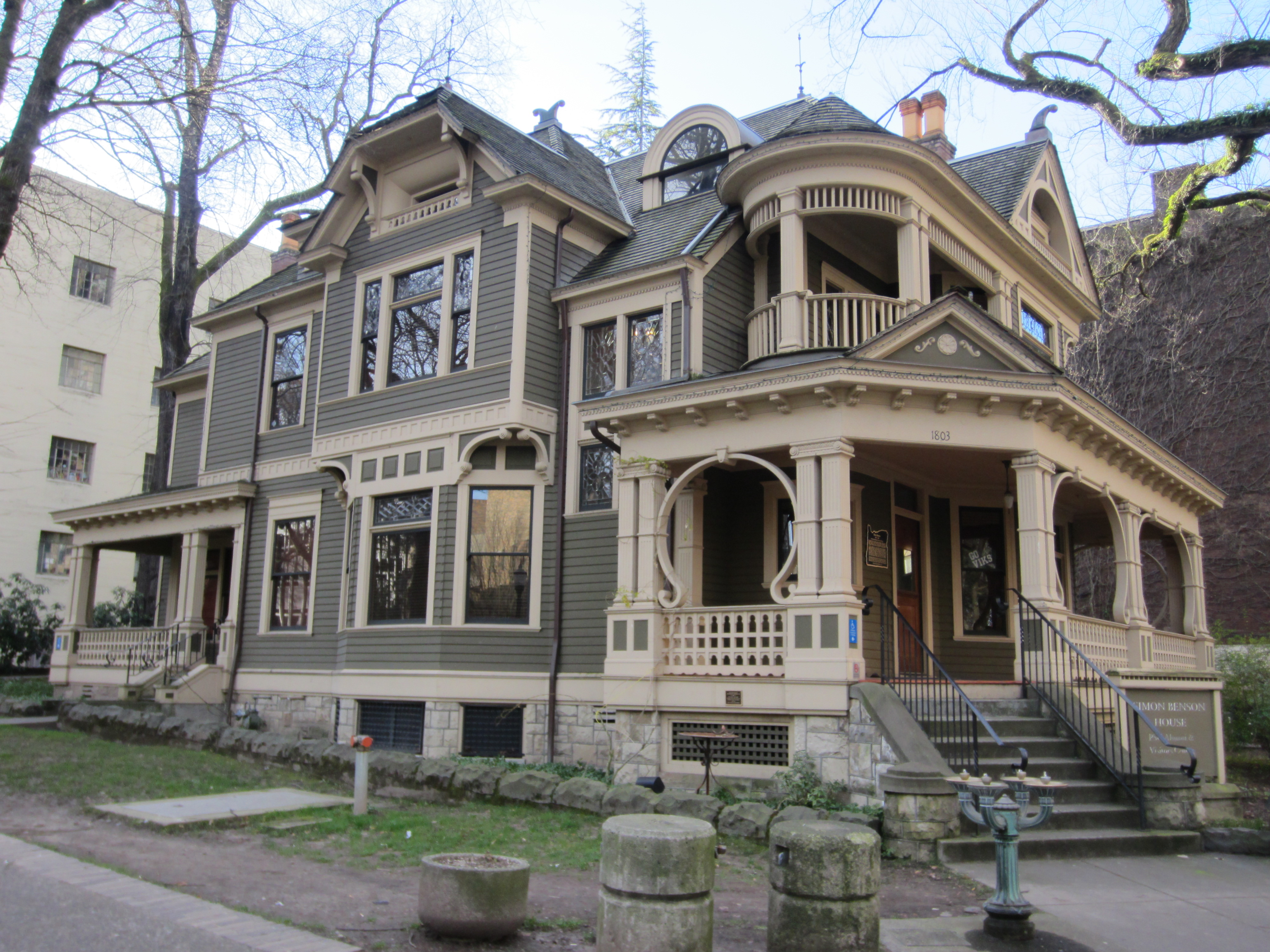
Simon Benson House in 2012

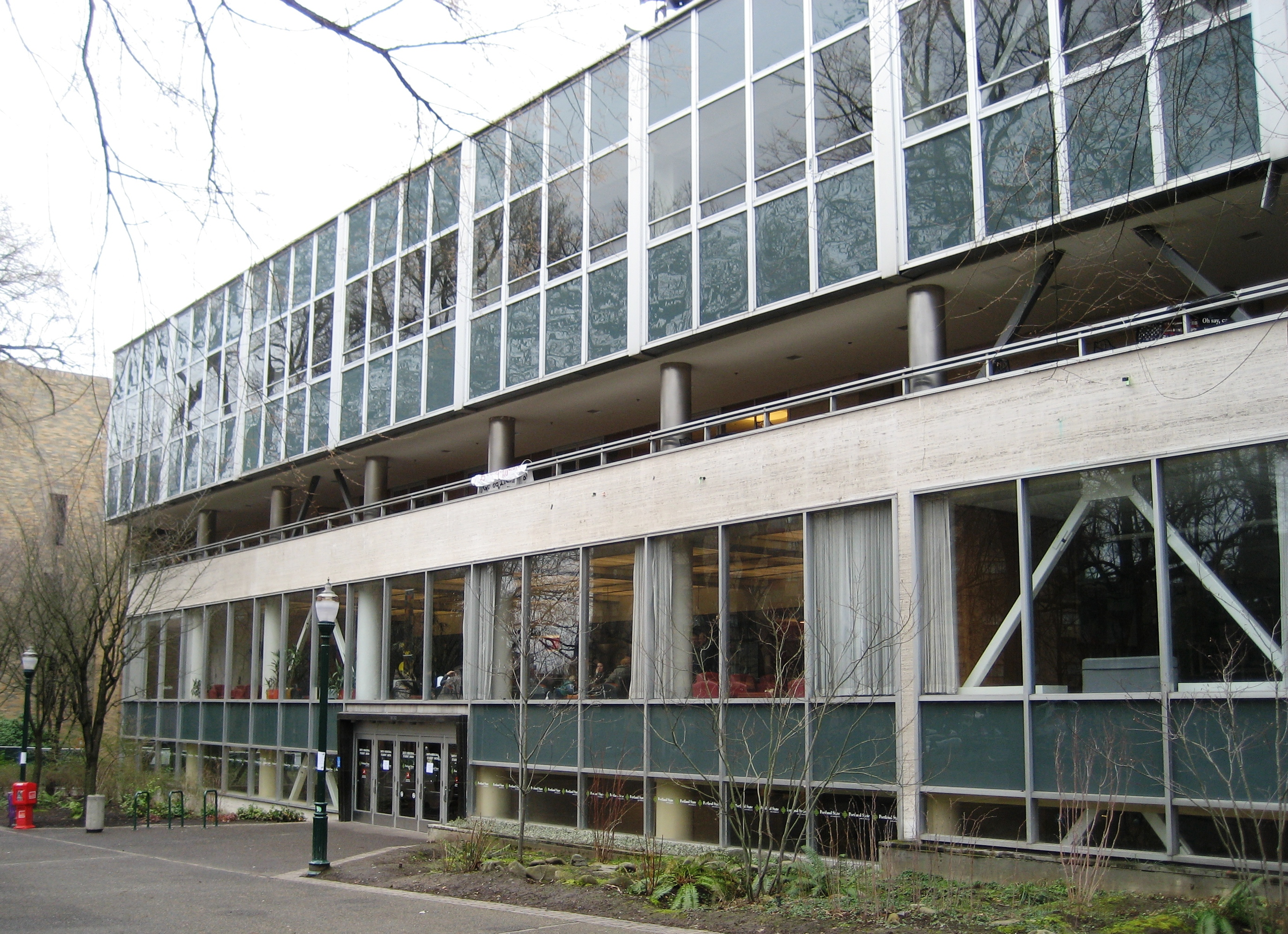
Smith Memorial Student Union, 2009

Buildings and structures on the Portland State University campus include:

- Academic and Student Recreation Center (ASRC)
- Art Building and Annex (AB)
- Blackstone Residence Hall (BLKS)
- Broadway Residence Hall (BDWY)
- Campus and Grounds Trailer (CGT)
- Campus Public Safety (CPS)
- Collaborative Life Sciences Building (CLSB)
- Corbett Building (COR)
- Cramer Hall (CH)
- Crown Plaza (CP)
- Douglas Fir Trailer Pod (DF)
- East Hall (EH)
- Engineering Building (EB)
- Fariborz Maseeh Hall (FMH) (formerly Neuberger Hall)
- Fifth Avenue Cinema (CIN)
- Fifth Avenue Lot (FAL)
- Fourth Avenue Building (FAB)
- George C. Hoffmann Hall (HOFF)
- Harder House (HAR)
- Harrison Street Building (HSB)
- Helen Gordon Child Development Center (HGCDC)
- Joseph C. Blumel Bike Garage (BBG)
- Joseph C. Blumel Residence Hall (BLU)
- Karl Miller Center (KMC)
- King Albert Residence Hall (KNGA)
- Lincoln Hall (LH)
- Millar Library (ML)
- Millar Library Bike Garage (LBG)
- Montgomery Residence Hall (MONT)
- Native American Student and Community Center (NASCC)
- North Greenhouse (NGH)
- Ondine Residence Hall (OND)
- Parking Structure 1 (PS1)
- Parking Structure 2 (PS2)
- Parking Structure 3 (PS3)
- Parkmill (PKM)
- Parkway Residence Hall (PKWY)
- Peter W. Stott Center (PSC)
- Ponderosa Pine Trailer Pod (PP)
- Research Greenhouse (RGH)
- Richard & Maurine Neuberger Center (RMNC) (formerly Market Center Building (MCB))
- Saint Helens Residence Hall (STHL)
- Science and Education Center (SEC)
- Science Building One (SB1)
- Science Research and Teaching Center (SRTC)
- Shattuck Hall (SH)
- Simon Benson House (SBH)
- Smith Memorial Student Union (SMSU)
- South Greenhouse (SGH)
- Stephen E. Epler Residence Hall (SEH)
- Stratford Hall (STFD)
- University Center Building (UCB)
- University Honors (UH)
- University Place (UP)
- University Pointe (PNT)
- University Services Building (USB)
- University Technology Services (UTS)
- Urban Center Building (URBN)
- West Heating Plant (WHP)
- Western Hemlock Trailer Pod (WH)

== See also ==
- List of Marylhurst University buildings
- List of Reed College buildings
- List of University of Oregon buildings
- List of University of Portland buildings
- List of Willamette University buildings
