= Knight Library =

- University of Oregon Library and Memorial Quadrangle
- U.S. National Register of Historic Places
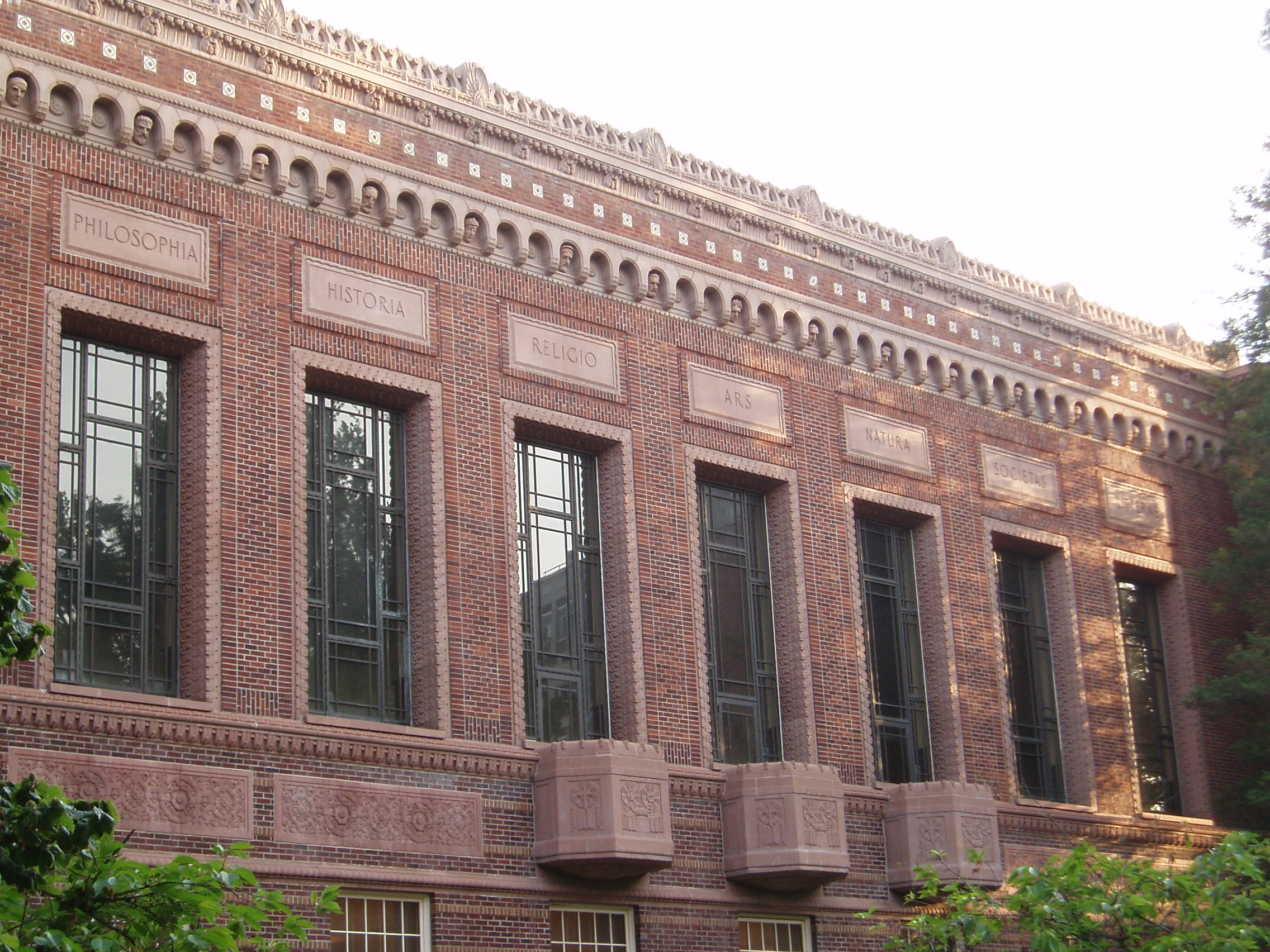
- Detail of north facade.
- Location: Eugene, Oregon
- Coordinates: 44.04325°N 123.0777°W
- Built: 1937
- Architect: Ellis F. Lawrence
- Architectural style: Lombardic Romanesque, Art Deco
- NRHP reference No.: 90000370
- Added to NRHP: 1990

Knight Library is the main facility of the University of Oregon's (UO) library system. It is located on the university's campus in Eugene, Oregon, United States. The library design is emblematic of the architecture of the university's older buildings, and it serves as a hub of student activity. As of 2008 it has a collection of more than 3 million volumes. The library also holds collections of primary sources such as photographs and manuscripts on various topics at the Special Collections & University Archives. It is also a depository for the Federal Depository Library Program. The library was previously known as the Main Library and it was renamed the Knight Library in 1988, in honor of the family of Phil Knight.

== Construction and history ==
The building was opened in 1937 to replace the original library building (the "Old Libe," Fenton Hall, completed in 1907), which the University's collections had outgrown. Construction of the library was financed as a Depression-era Works Progress Administration (WPA) project, spearheaded by Oregon senator Frederick Steiwer and took more than two years to complete. "The New Libe" as the Oregon Daily Emerald student newspaper had christened the building, was designed by Ellis F. Lawrence of the Oregon-based architectural firm Lawrence, Holford, and Allyn. Lawrence was also a driving force in much of the core architecture of the UO campus and was the first Dean of the School of Architecture and Allied Arts. The rich architecture of the building reflects an Art Deco aesthetic with "modernized Lombardy and Greco-Roman" elements as well as many integrated artistic embellishments including "the fifteen stone heads by Edna Dunberg and Louise Utter Pritchard, ornamental memorial gates by O. B. Dawson, carved wooden panels by Arthur Clough, and two large murals painted by Albert and Arthur Runquist."

Three major renovations of the library, in 1950, 1966, and 1994, have kept the building up-to-date and it is a daily hub of learning and research to University of Oregon's more than 20,000 students. The $27 million renovation in 1994 added 132,000 square feet (12,000 m^{2}) to the building. The project was partially funded by Phil Knight, UO alumnus and cofounder of athletic shoe company Nike. The library was renamed Knight Library in honor of Knight's family. Contrary to press reports, which claim Knight financed the whole project, Knight only financed a portion of the library's renovation. The state government contributed close to two thirds of the cost.

In late June 2020 UO officials said the original 1937 portion of Knight Library had been vandalized with paint on the sidewalk and the front door. The vandalism was directed at the phrase "our racial heritage" in a mission statement on a mural. According to KEZI news, the same mural words had been vandalized in 2018. Library staff had posted a statement a week earlier, "We will cover the Knight Library murals that contain racist content by October 1st."

== Collections ==
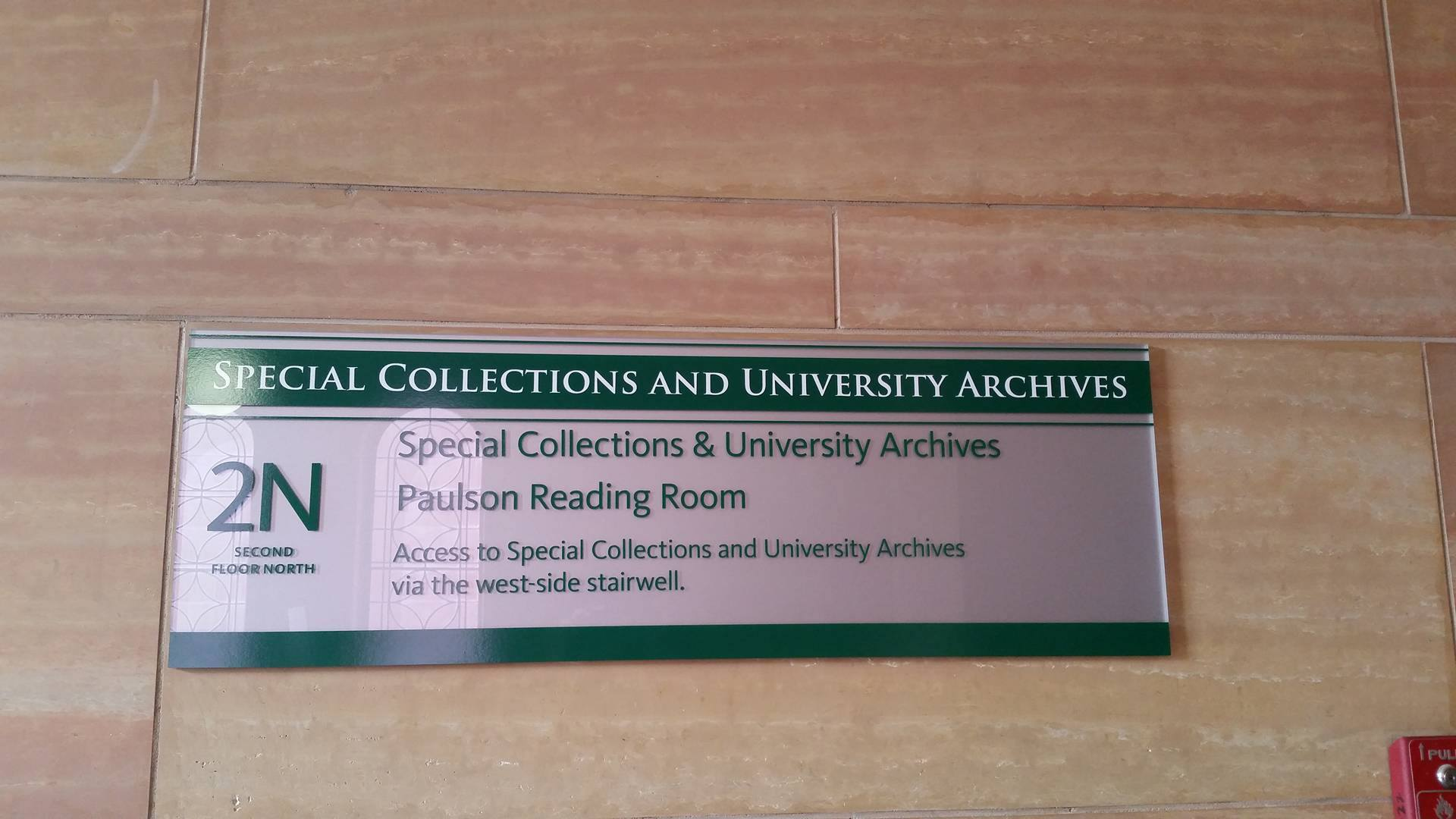
Entrance to the Special Collections & University Archives

The University of Oregon Special Collections & University Archives collects and preserves over 3000 collections of primary sources on a variety of topics. These collections range from rare books, manuscripts, original art, photographs, architectural drawings and many more. It is located on the second floor of the Knight Library of University of Oregon. They help not only students and community members, but also faculty research using special collections.

== Architecture and Inscriptions ==
The original 1937 section of the library, designed by Lawrence, contains inscriptions along the tops of each of seven large windows on the main (north) facade. These read, "Philosophia," "Historia," "Religio," "Ars," "Natura," "Societas," and "Litterae," and are meant to represent (in Latin), the seven major disciplines contained in the library's collection.

Above the main entry doors (also on the north facade), is a passage from the Bible (John 8:32), which proclaims over the northeast doors "Ye shall know the truth", and over the northwest doors "and the truth shall make you free."

== National Register of Historic Places ==
The University of Oregon Library and Memorial Quadrangle, which consists of the library and the quadrangle that spans from the north facade of the library to 13th Avenue, was added to the National Register of Historic Places in 1990. The quadrangle was part of E. F. Lawrence's design for the UO campus, and is bordered by the Jordan Schnitzer Museum of Art and Chapman Hall on the east, and Prince Lucien Campbell Hall and Condon Hall on the west. The landscaping of the quad includes eight English oak trees planted in 1940.

A pavement on the south of the memorial quadrangle features several inscriptions:

"Wonder, not doubt, is the root of knowledge" —Abraham Joshua Heschel

"Who asks, finds" —Arabic proverb

"Learning without thought is labor lost. Thought without learning is perilous" —Confucius

"Books are humanity in print" —Barbara Tuchman

== Images ==
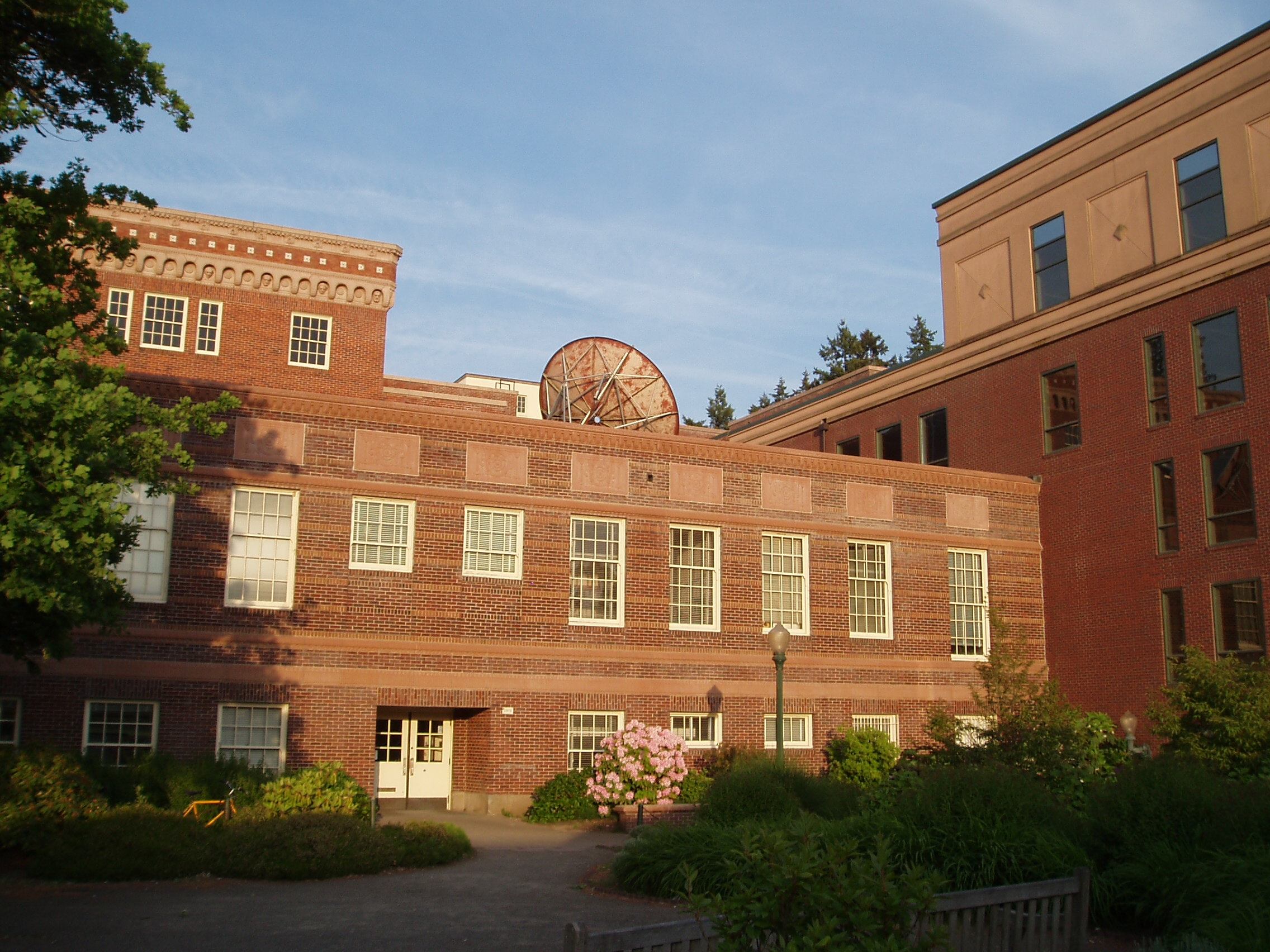
West side of the Library, showing all three main phases of construction

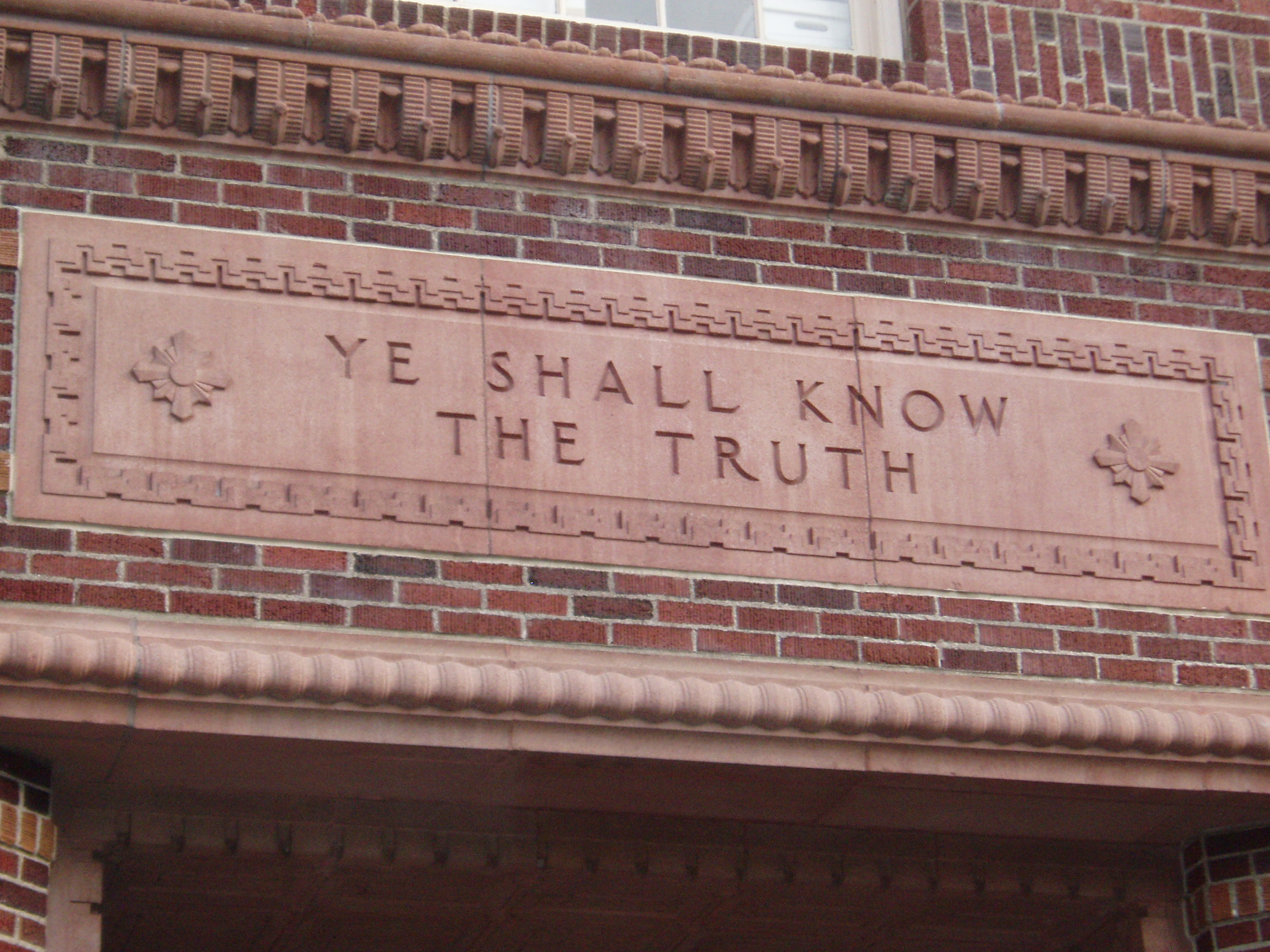
Detail of the inscription over the east door (on the north side)

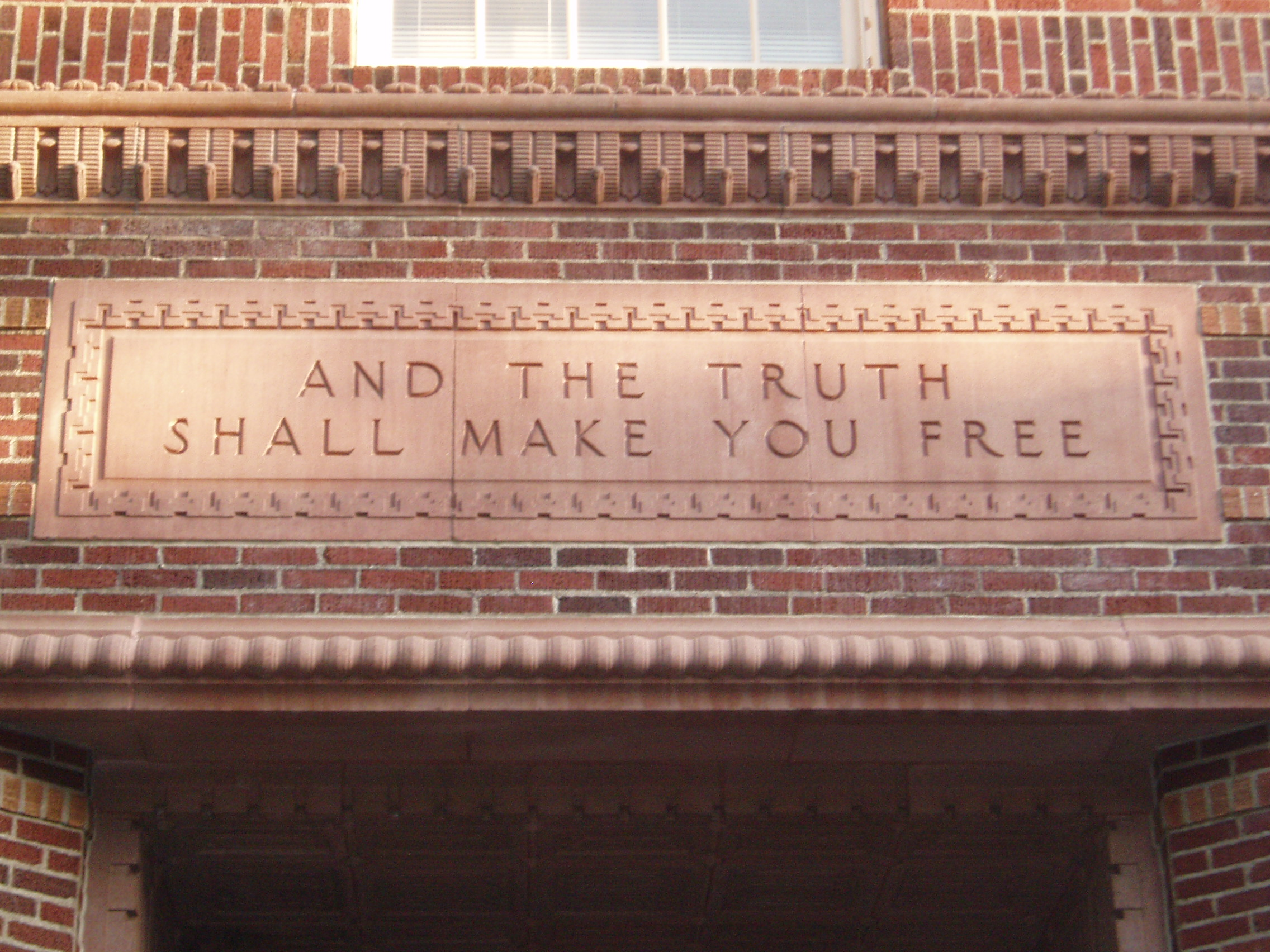
Detail of the inscription over the west door (on the north side)

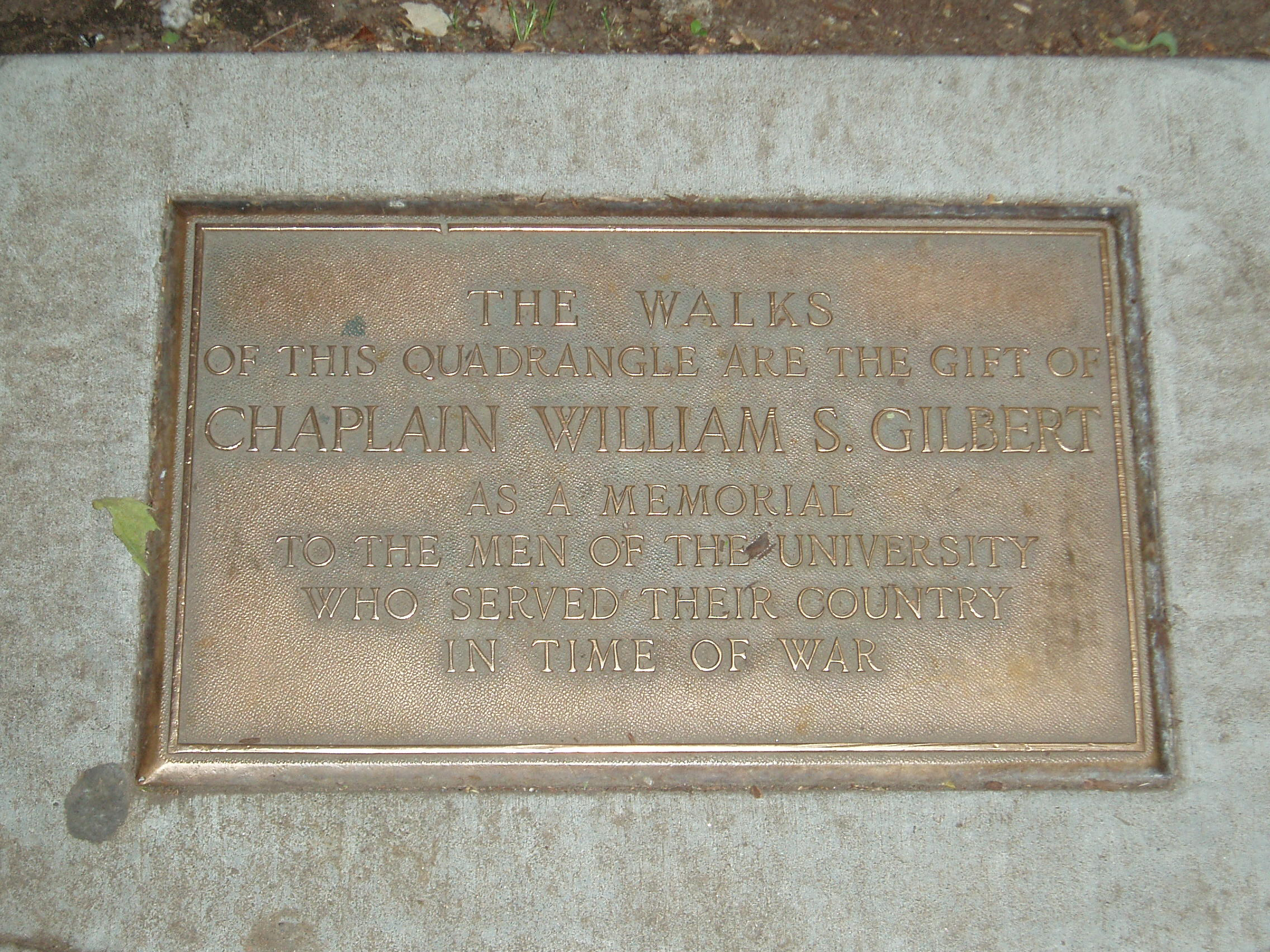
Plaque dedicating walks of the quadrangle to war veterans

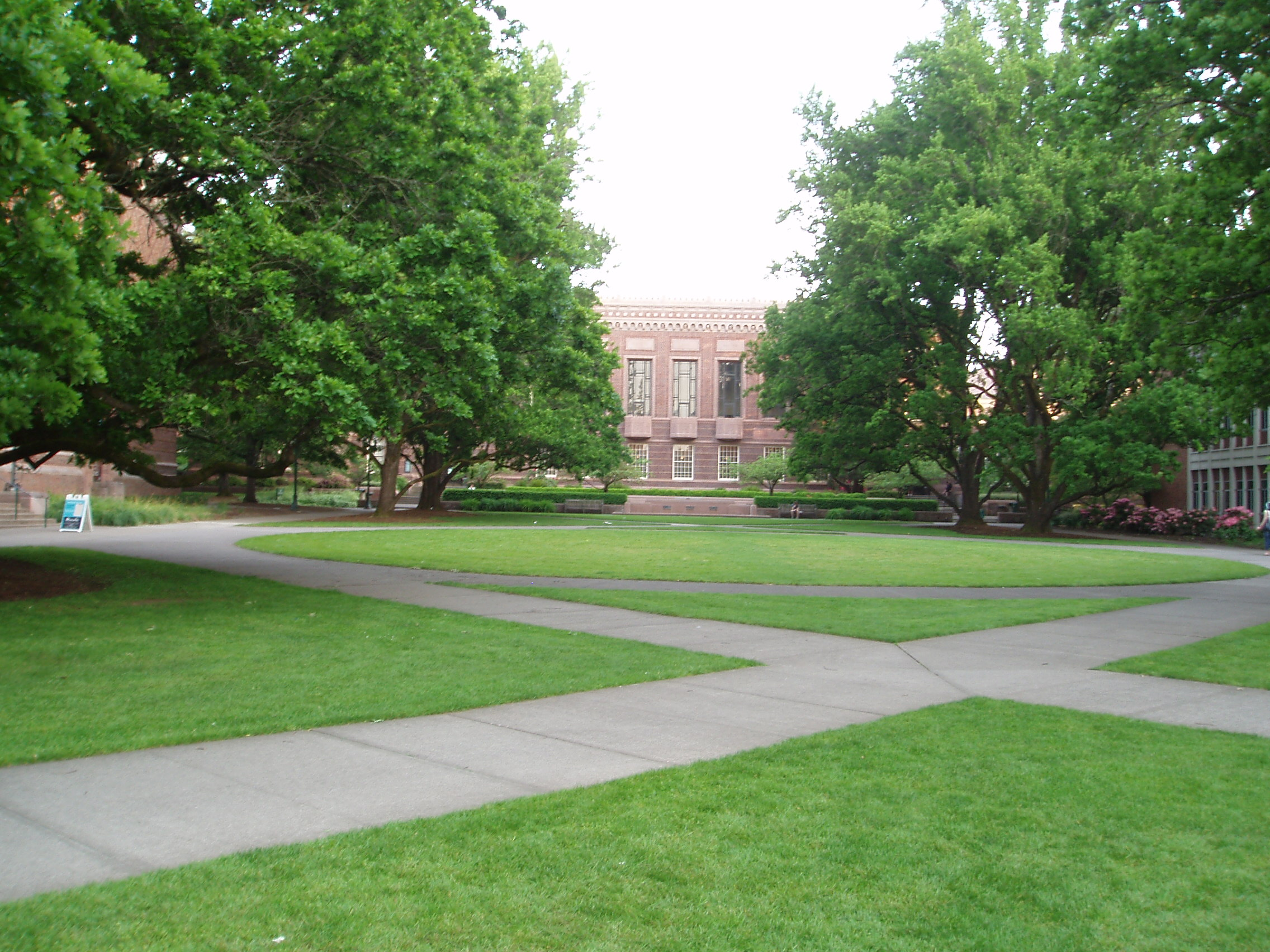
View of the quad looking south toward the library

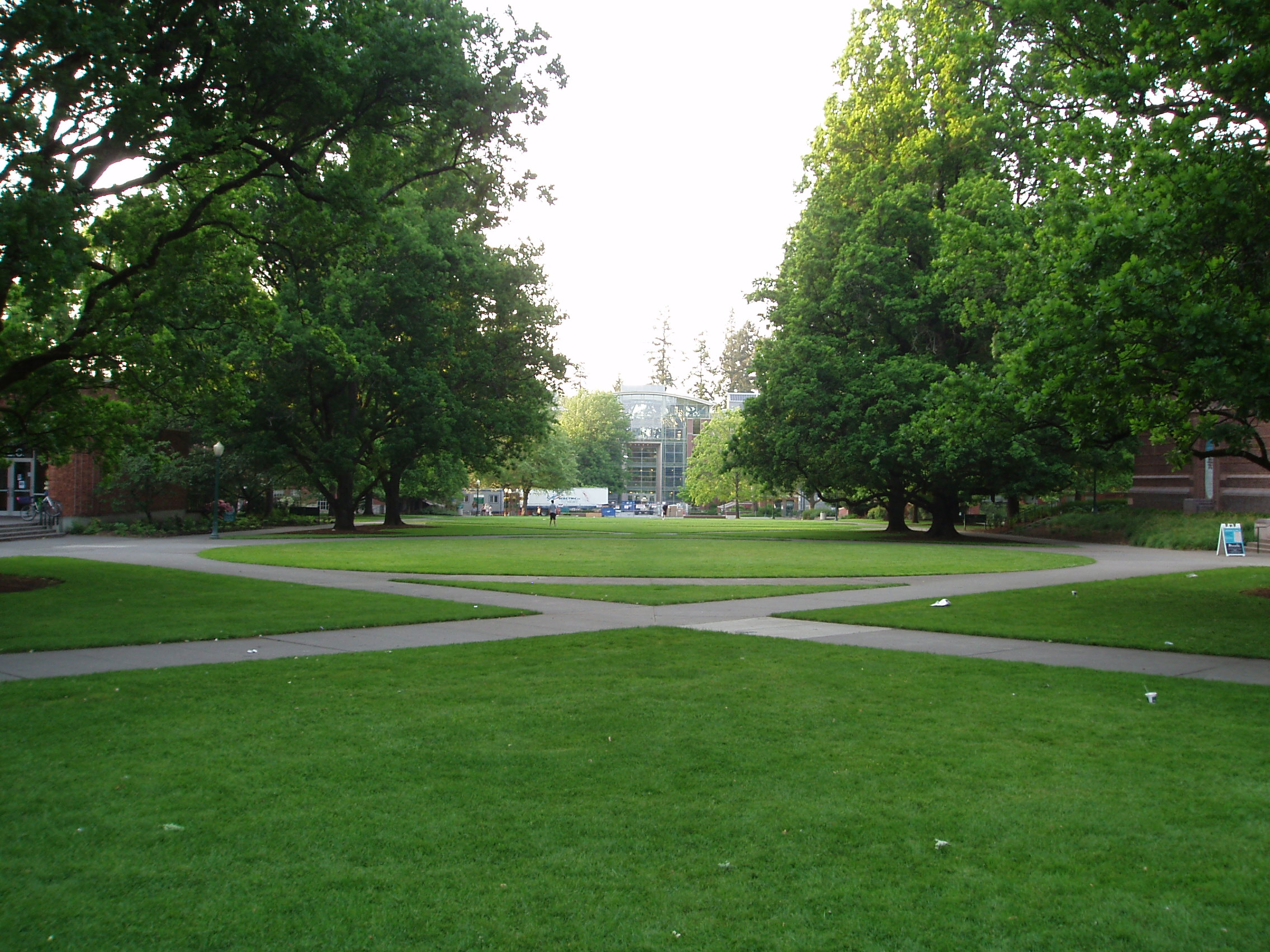
View of the quad looking north toward 13th Ave.

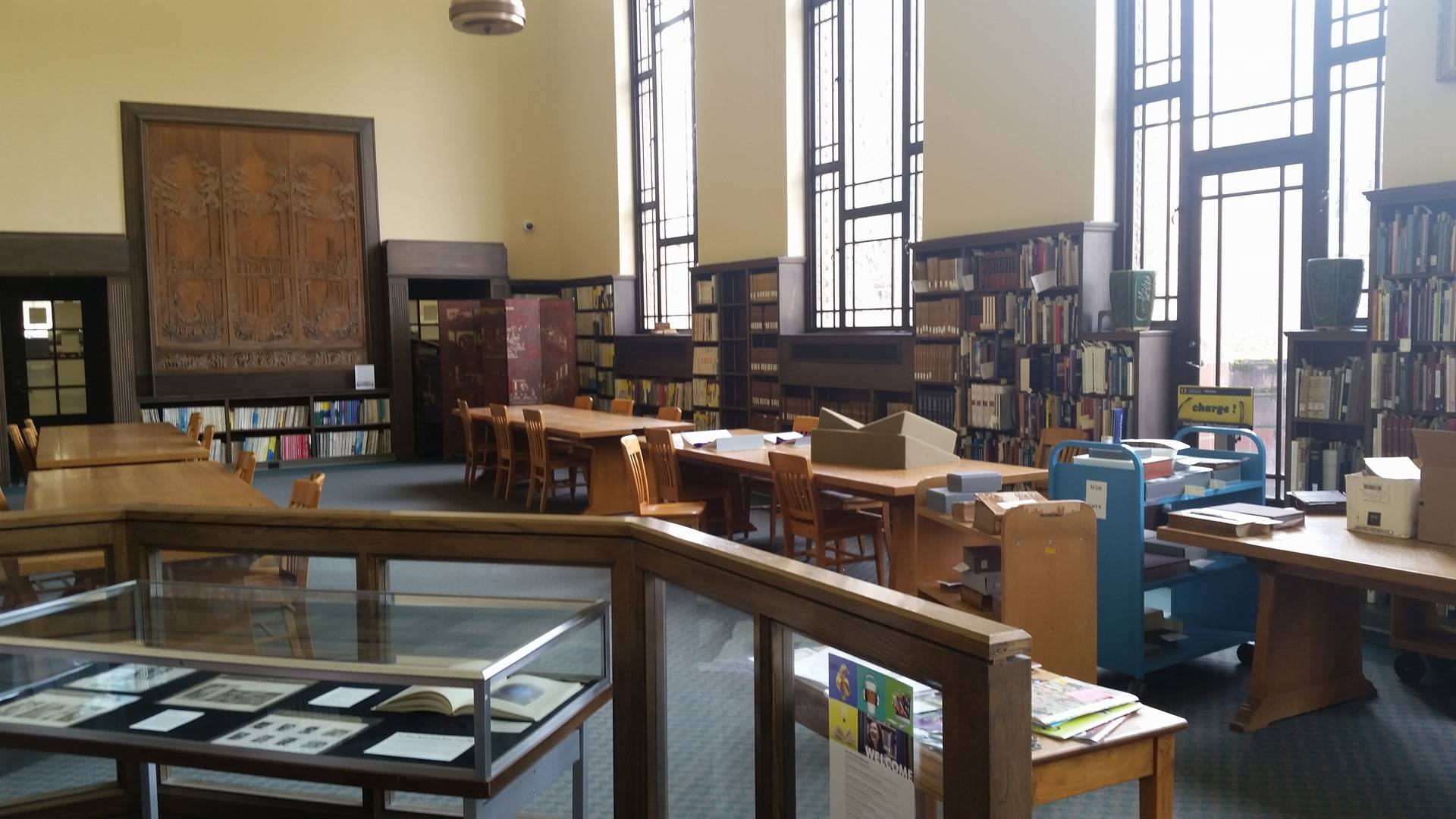
Paulson Reading room at the Special Collections & University Archives (SCUA) at the University of Oregon
