= White Stag Block =

Building complex in Portland, Oregon, U.S.

Coordinates: 45.52350°N 122.67062°W

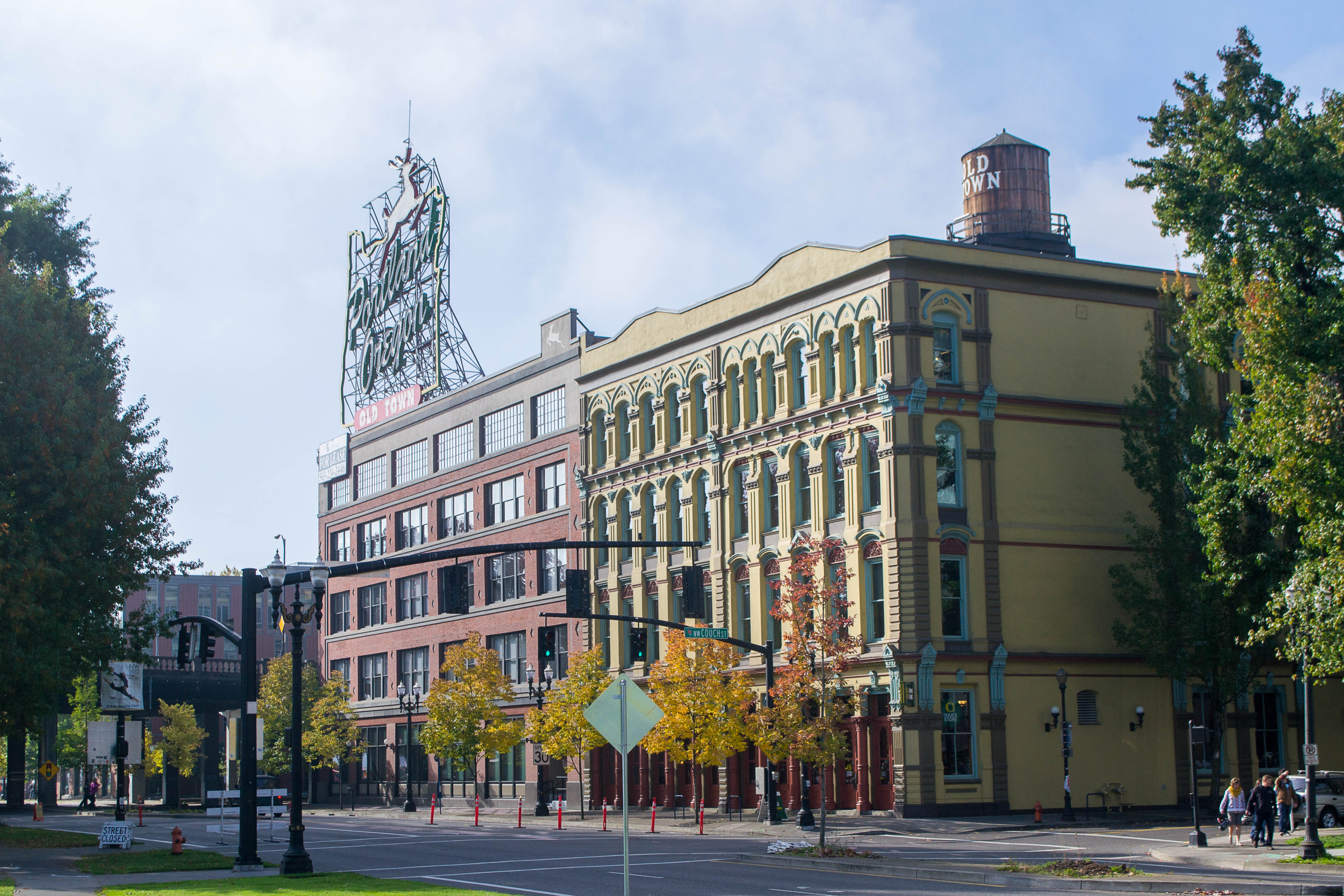
The White Stag Block in 2013

The White Stag Block facility refers to the Bickel Block Building, the Skidmore Block Building, and the White Stag Building, in Portland, Oregon's Old Town Chinatown neighborhood, in the United States. It was purchased by the University of Oregon Foundation in 2015.

== See also ==
- List of University of Oregon buildings
- The Duck Store
- University of Oregon College of Design
- White Stag sign
