= Art Building and Annex =

Building on the Portland State University campus in Portland, Oregon, U.S.

- Interactive map of the Art Building and Annex area
- Alternative names: Art Annex

General information
- Type: Art building
- Location: Portland, Oregon, United States
- Coordinates: 45.5084°N 122.6828°W
- Renovated: 2009
- Owner: Portland State University

The Art Building and Annex (or Art Annex) are buildings on the Portland State University campus in Portland, Oregon, United States. The Annex underwent a renovation in 2009. Both buildings have been considered for demolition.

== See also ==
- List of Portland State University buildings
