= LaVerne Krause =

American artist (1924–1987)

- Born: LaVerne Irene Erickson; July 21, 1924; Portland, Oregon
- Died: May 6, 1987 (aged 62)^{a} Eugene, Oregon
- Education: Museum Art School; University of Oregon
- Known for: Educator, studio artist and arts activist; national president of Artists Equity
- Spouse: Labrecht Gerhard Krause^{b}
- Awards: 1980 Governor's Arts Award for excellence and service to the arts in Oregon; University of Oregon Distinguished Service Award
- Memorials: LaVerne Krause Gallery

LaVerne Erickson Krause (1924–1987) was an American artist. She founded the University of Oregon printmaking program and taught there for twenty years, creating more than ten thousand paintings and prints in her lifetime. An advocate for artists' economic and working conditions, she was instrumental in founding the Oregon chapter of the Artists Equity Association and served as president of the national Artists Equity. She is "recognized for her outstanding contributions as an educator, studio artist, and arts activist".

== Early life and education ==
LaVerne Krause was born on July 21, 1924, in Portland, Oregon. She was adopted at the age of six weeks and raised on a farm outside of Portland by her great-uncle and great-aunt, James Martin and Hannah (Wrolstad) Erickson. She attended the University of Oregon in Eugene on an art scholarship, working in the summers at the Commercial Iron Works shipyards in Portland as a scaler scraping ships' hulls to remove rust, and eventually as a blueprint machine operator at another shipyard ironworks, Poole McGonigle. She graduated in 1946. While at the University of Oregon, she studied under Jack Wilkinson, whom she considered to be her greatest teacher. In Portland, she attended classes and eventually began teaching at the Museum Art School.

After finishing her degree at the University of Oregon in 1946, she married Labrecht Gerhard Krause,^{b} a World War II veteran whom she had known since elementary school. They had two sons and a daughter. In 1949 the couple returned to Portland, where he resumed working for the National Biscuit Company.

== Career ==
Krause's first showing in a juried art show was at the Portland Art Museum in 1949. By 1951, she had begun taking classes at the Museum Art School, sponsored by the Portland Art Museum, and her first gallery showing was at Louis Bunce's Kharouba Gallery in Portland. By 1952, she held her first solo exhibition at the Portland Art Museum.

In 1954, her husband's work returned the family to Eugene and Krause became active in the local Artists Equity. They returned to Portland two years later, where Krause became interested in woodcuts and etching by 1956, and printmaking by 1958, as a half-time student at the Museum Art School.

Divorced in 1960, Krause taught children's classes at the Museum Art School, and attended there half-time as a student. She exhibited her paintings for sale in a beauty parlor and in the hallway of a Gay Nineties tavern in southwest Portland. In fall 1965, Jack Wilkinson invited Krause to give a lecture in Eugene on "Long Life of the Woodcut", and subsequently invited her to join the faculty to teach etching.

She started the printmaking program at the University of Oregon as the only woman in the Department of Fine and Applied Arts (now the Department of Art). She served on the university's Faculty Committee on the Status of Women, and Gov. Mark Hatfield appointed her to his Planning Council for the Arts, leading to establishment of the Oregon Arts Commission. In 1981 she helped found the Northwest Print Council.

Krause taught at the University of Oregon from 1966 to 1986, where she was known as "a strong influence on art students and young artists". She created over ten thousand prints and paintings in her lifetime.

Krause advocated for artists' economic and working conditions, and became a founding member of the Oregon chapter of the Artists Equity Association. She became its president from 1954 to 1955 and 1966–1968; she was national president of Artists Equity from 1969 to 1970. According to Arlene Schnitzer, "Way back before it was fashionable, she was an activist on behalf of women and artists." "She taught me a lot," Schnitzer once said.

Krause died at Sacred Heart General Hospital on May 6, 1987,^{a} age 62, after fighting cancer for four years.

== Artistic style ==
The Portland Art Museum quotes Krause's biography printed in Oregon Painters: the First Hundred Years (1859–1959), noting that in 1959 her style shifted to abstract expressionism:

Her palette ranged from hot purple, red, and turquoise to cool pastels, with the color applied in repeating bands. She believed light and color were central to conveying the mood of what was experienced .... Her early paintings showed bridges, cities, and architecture — used for their structural qualities as well as their evocative powers. As her painting matured, she stripped them down to the simplest forms, using color and light to develop her vision.

== Awards and legacy ==
Krause won a Ford Foundation purchase prize in 1964 in Seattle. She was recognized in 1980 with the highest honor Oregon bestows upon an artist, the Oregon Governor's Art Award.

In 1991, the University of Oregon created the LaVerne Krause Gallery in Lawrence Hall in her honor. The gallery hosts exhibitions of student artwork throughout the academic year.

== See also ==
- University of Oregon School of Architecture and Allied Arts

== Notes ==
a.Sources conflict on her death date. The Eugene Register-Guard on Thursday, May 7, 1987, reported her death date as Wednesday (May 6, 1987). A second source, however, the "Oregon Death Index, 1898-2008" record on Ancestry.com, reports a different death date: May 5, 1987. (A subscription is required to access records on Ancestry.com.)

b.Sources conflict on the spelling of her husband's given name. LaVerne Krause's oral history interview in the Smithsonian Archives of American Art transcribed his name with an "a" in the initial syllable, as "Labrecht". U.S.Marine Muster Rolls indexed on Ancestry.com list his name as Lebrecht with an "e" in the first syllable. The Oregon Marriage Index maintained by the Oregon State Library also lists his name as "Lebrecht". (A subscription is required to access records on Ancestry.com.)
