= Simon Benson House =

Historic building in Portland, Oregon, U.S.

- U.S. National Register of Historic Places
- Portland Historic Landmark
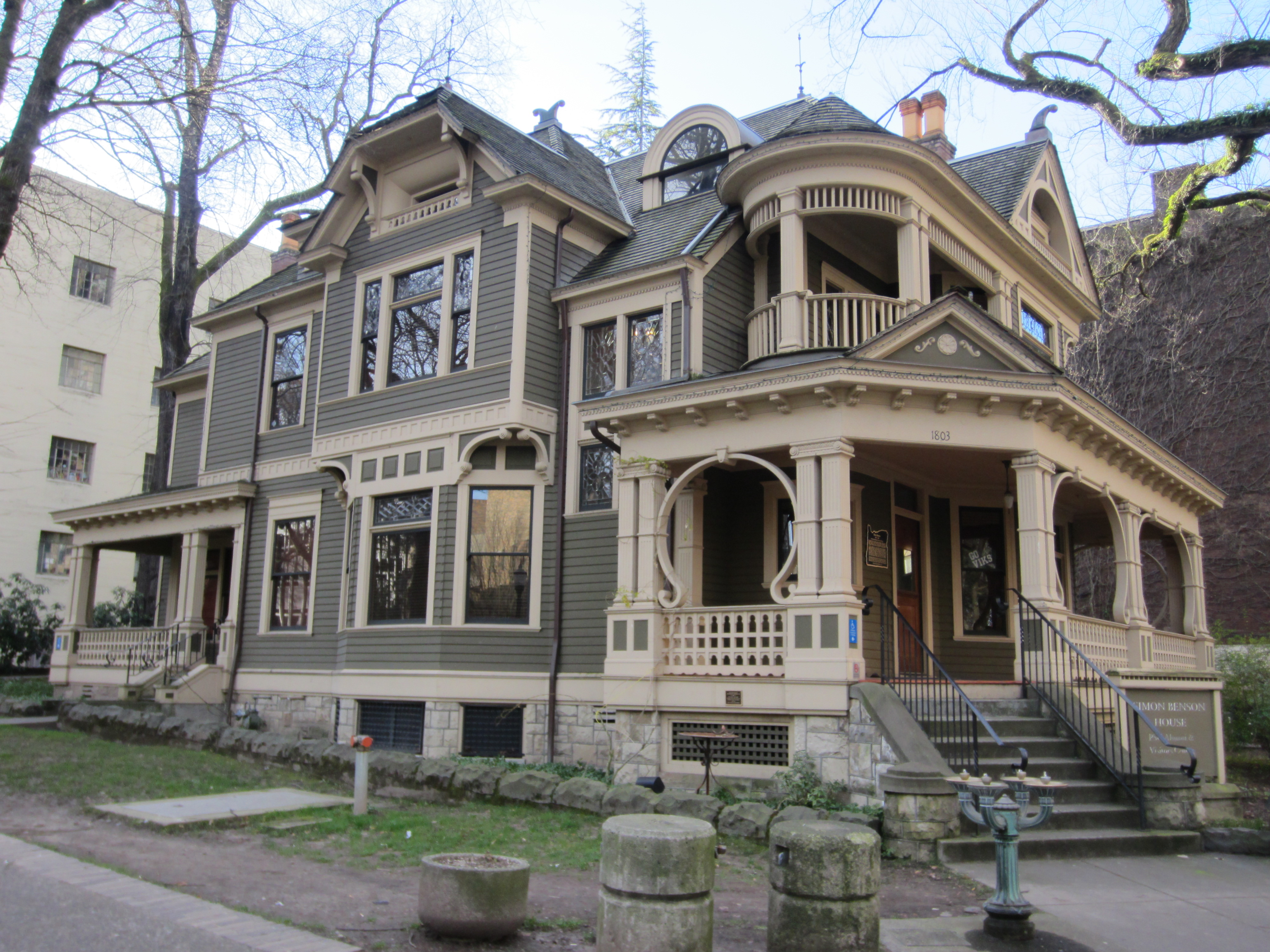
- Simon Benson House in 2012

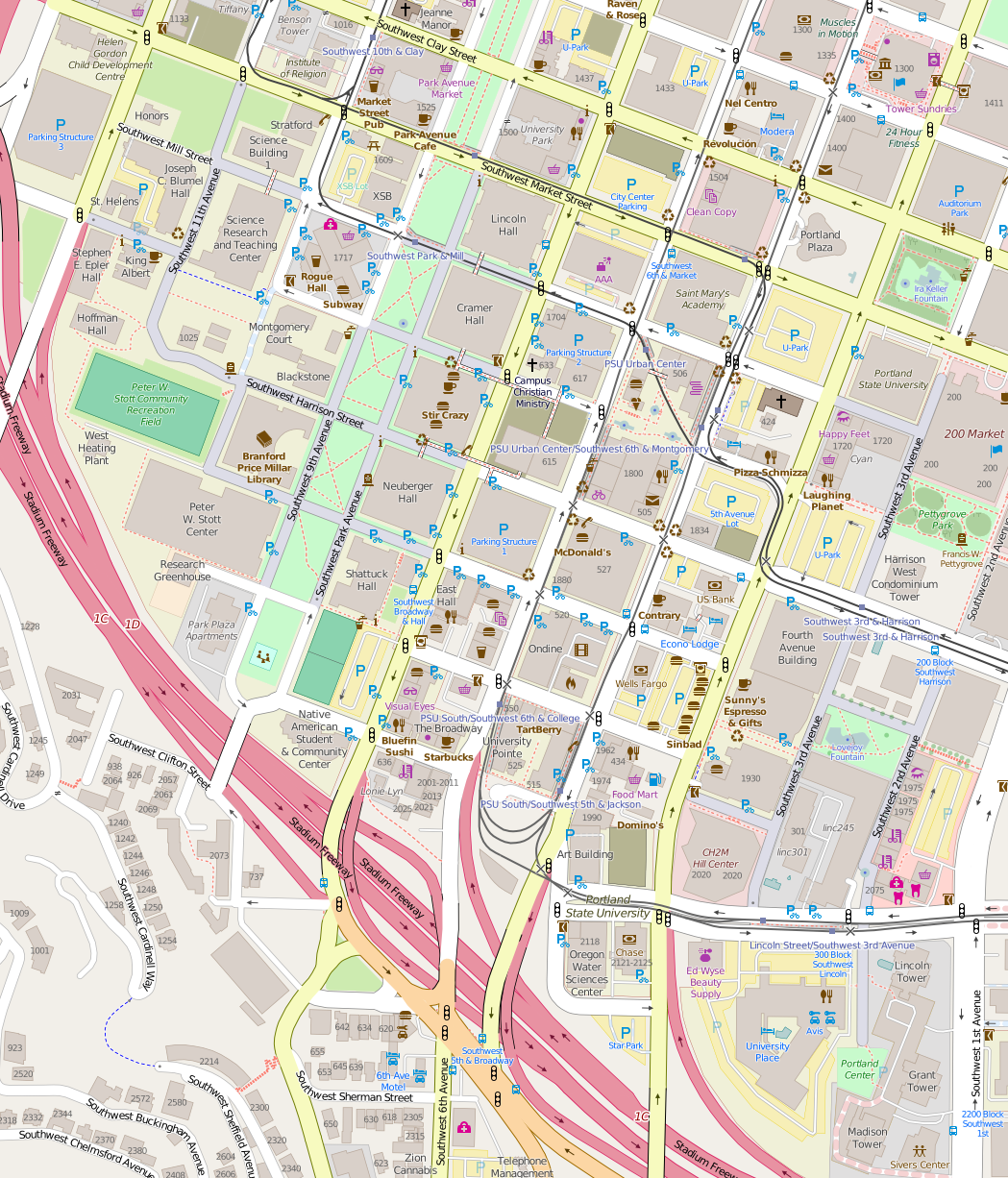
- Location within Portland State University OR
- Location: 1803 SW Park Avenue; Portland, Oregon
- Coordinates: 45°30′44″N 122°41′07″W
- Built: 1900
- Architectural style: Queen Anne
- NRHP reference No.: 01000155
- Added to NRHP: October 25, 2002

The Simon Benson House is a 19th-century house located in downtown Portland, Oregon. It was listed on the National Register of Historic Places in 1983.

== History ==
The Queen Anne style house was built of wood-frame construction in 1900. Norwegian immigrant Simon Benson (1851-1942) was a leading businessman, innovator, and philanthropist. Benson helped build Benson Polytechnic High School and gave the iconic bronze Benson Bubbler drinking fountains to the City of Portland. He had the house built as a residence for his family. The Benson family moved from the house in 1913 when the Benson Hotel was completed.

During the 1930s, the house was turned into a boarding house, and then later divided into apartments. The house was originally located at SW 11th and Clay Avenue. It was moved to its current location at SW Park and Montgomery Street at Portland State University (PSU) in 2000. It is currently owned by Portland State University and is the former site of the PSU Alumni Association.

== See also ==
- National Register of Historic Places listings in Southwest Portland, Oregon
