= Burchard Woodson DeBusk =

American educator

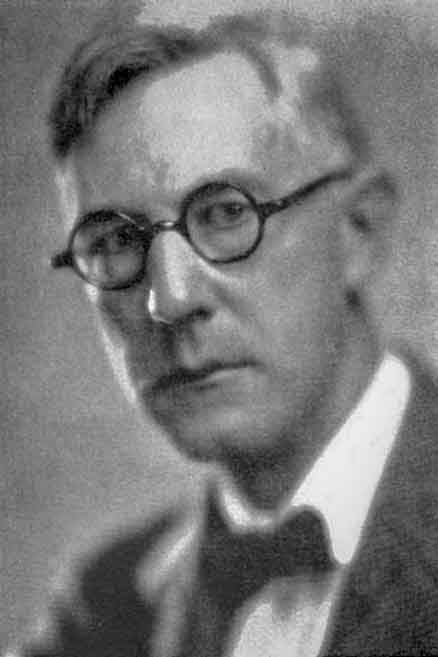
- Image courtesy of the Oregon State Library
- Born: October 23, 1877; Shelbyville, Indiana, US
- Died: July 29, 1936 (aged 58); Eugene, Oregon, US
- Education: Clark University
- Occupation: Professor of Education
- Years active: 1905 – 1936
- Employer: University of Oregon
- Organization: School of Education
- Spouse: Sara Matella Druley

Burchard Woodson DeBusk (October 23, 1877 – July 29, 1936) was a professor of education at the University of Oregon, United States.

== Early life and education ==
DeBusk was born in 1877 in Shelbyville, Indiana. He attended Central Normal College in Danville, Indiana, in the 1890s. While at Danville, DeBusk taught students at rural Indiana schools. He received a bachelor of arts degree from Indiana University Bloomington in 1904, and he was awarded a Ph.D. in education from Clark University in 1915.

DeBusk married Sara Matella Druley, a classmate at Indiana University, in 1905.

== Career ==
In 1904 DeBusk became a psychology instructor at Southwestern College in Winfield, Kansas, and in 1910 he was appointed associate professor of psychology at Colorado State Teachers College.

DeBusk joined the faculty at the University of Oregon College of Education in 1915, a job he kept until his death in 1936. He quickly became a noted expert in educational psychology and school hygiene. While at Oregon, DeBusk traveled and lectured frequently, serving as a consultant to school districts and even to the juvenile court in Portland, Oregon. In the 1920s, DeBusk headed the department of research at Portland Public Schools.

DeBusk died soon after suffering a myocardial infarction in July 1936. The Clinic for Exceptional Children, a center for remedial testing and evaluation at the College of Education, was renamed DeBusk Memorial Clinic for Exceptional Children.

== Publications ==
- The persistence of language errors among school children (UO Press, 1930)
- with Grace Fernald and Lillian Rayner, Clinical Nuggets (UO Press, 1930)
- with R. W. Leighton, A study of pupil achievement and attendant problems (UO Press, 1931)
