= Smith Memorial Student Union =

Building on the Portland State University campus in Portland, Oregon, US

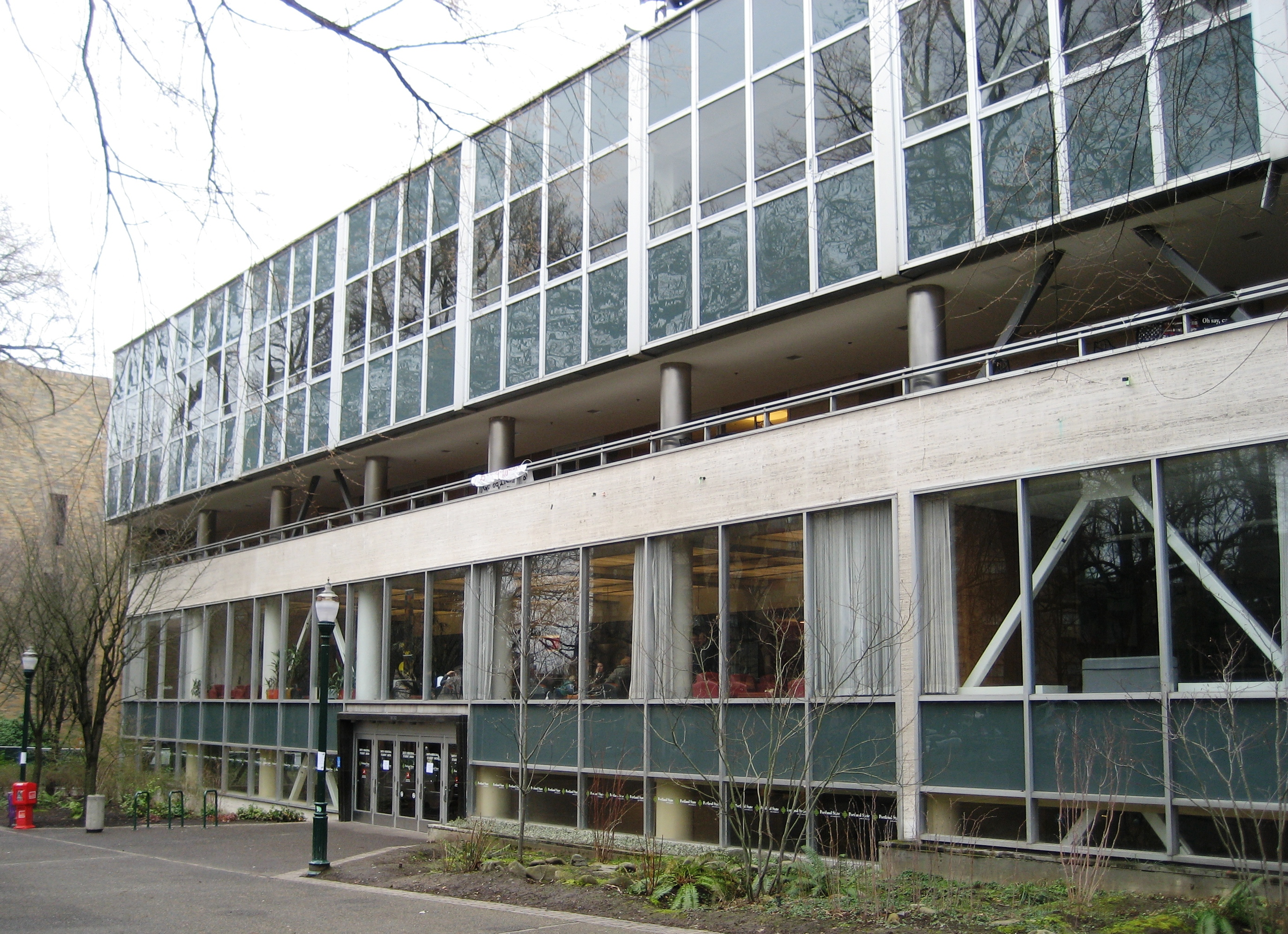
- Building exterior in 2009

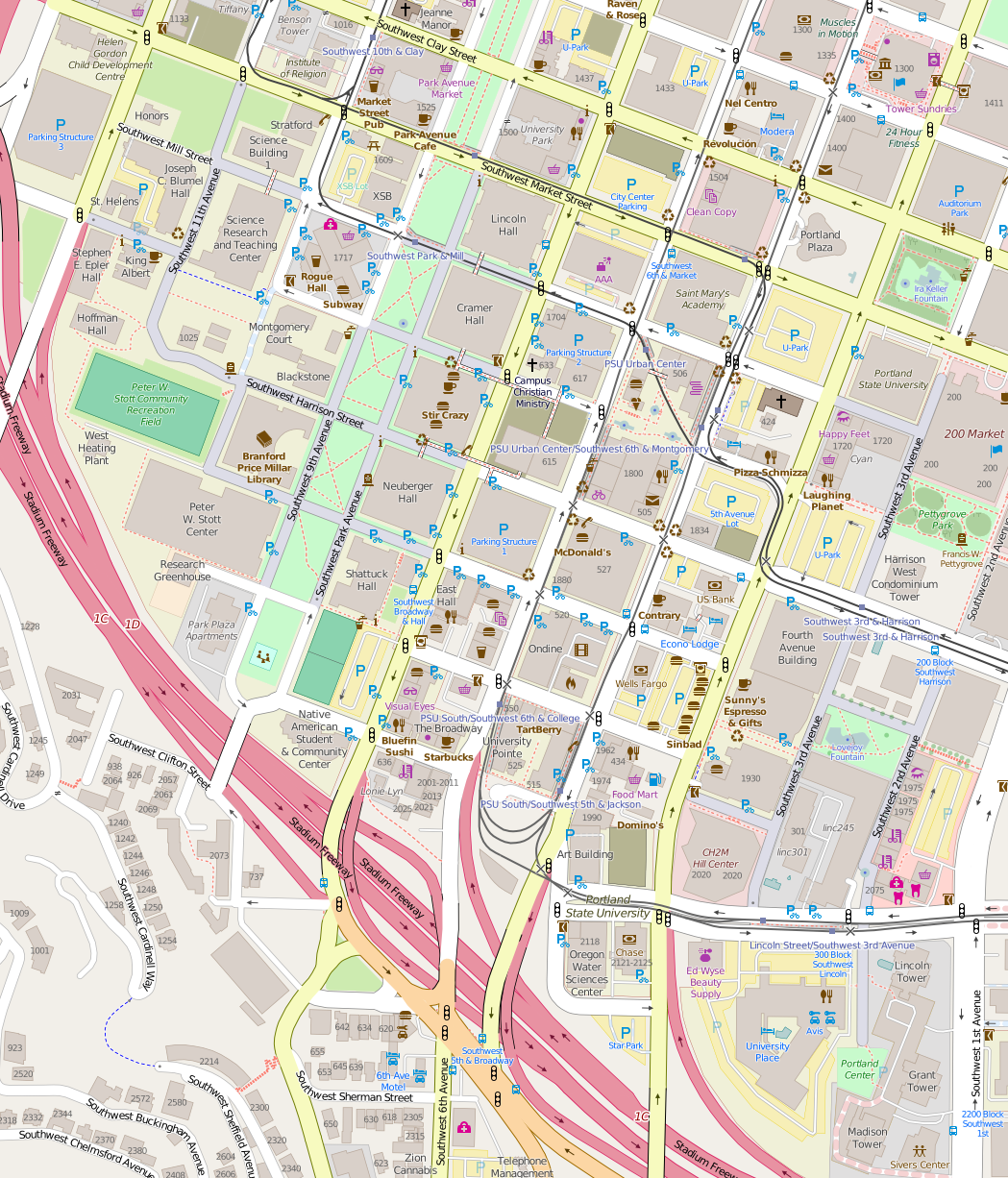
- Location within Portland State University OR
- Former names: Portland State College Student Center

General information
- Type: Student union
- Architectural style: Modern International
- Location: 1825 SW Broadway, Portland, Oregon
- Coordinates: 45.511828°N 122.684273°W
- Landlord: Portland State University

Design and construction
- Architects: Lawrence, Tucker & Wallmann (1957, 1961), Mockford & Rudd (1965)

Smith Memorial Student Union is a student union building on the Portland State University campus in Portland, Oregon, in the United States. It is named after PSU student land later graduate teaching assistant Michael Smith (1944–1968).
