= Chapman Hall =

Building at the University of Oregon, US

Coordinates: 44°2′43.3″N 123°4′37.3″W

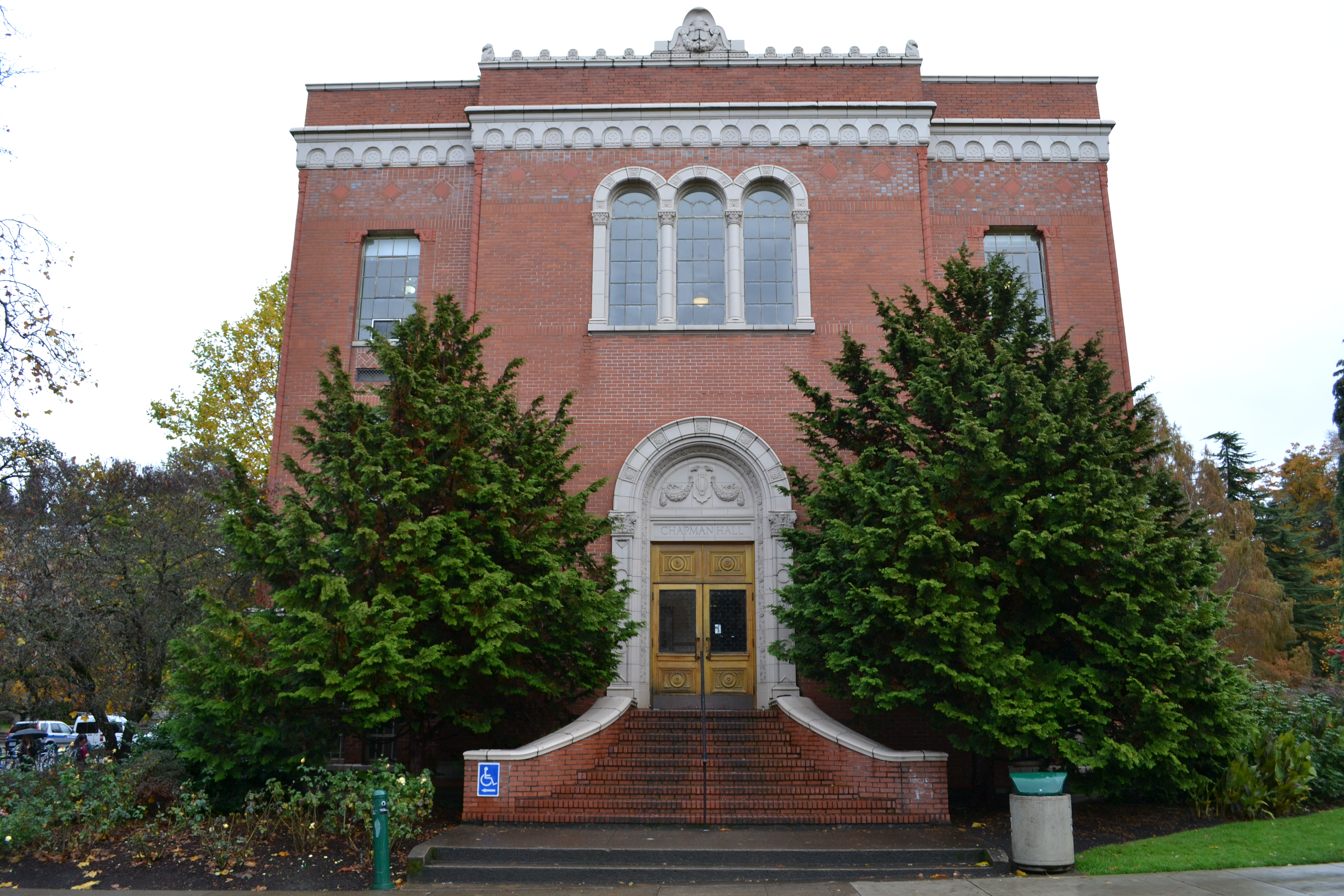
Chapman Hall

Chapman Hall is an academic building located on the University of Oregon campus. It was designed by Ellis F. Lawrence and was built in the late 1930s. Originally the location of the Home Economics department, today, it houses the Robert D. Clark Honors College.

== Design and construction ==
Design for the building commenced in 1937 by the architectural firm Lawrence, Holford and Allyn. The chief designer was Ellis F. Lawrence, the chief architect for the University from 1914 to 1946, who reused his own design for the University's Condon Hall, completed in 1925.

Construction of Chapman Hall began in December 1938 and was completed less than a year later in October 1939. The building was named after Charles H. Chapman, the second president of the University. The building was financed by both the Student Union and the Works Progress Administration.

== Description ==
Chapman Hall is located on the northeast corner of the Memorial Quad and was the sixth and last building to be built on that quad. The building initially housed the Home Economics department and the first UO Bookstore, a student cooperative. The bookstore was housed there from 1939 until 1966.

The building is rectangular in plan, constructed of concrete with a façade of terra cotta and brick. The style of the building is Mediterranean and is in keeping with many of the Lawrence buildings on the campus. The building has undergone some structural changes over time. In 1966, the façade was altered to change the north door into a window. In 1981, partitions were added to the third floor to make room for offices. Chapman Hall was the first fireproof building to be constructed at the University of Oregon. It would become the standard for the rest of the campus construction.

Most of the original interior of the building is still intact, including woodwork and a fireplace with ceramic tiles. In 1942, a Works Progress Administration mural in the New Deal Social Realist style was added to room 223 by E. R. Scott as his thesis work. It depicts famous American figures such as Thomas Paine, and Thomas Jefferson. The building has decorative elements of red and white terra cotta tiles, Roman arches, basket weave brick pattern below the windows. Chapman Hall would be the last use of terra cotta at the University of Oregon.

In 2019, a $10.5 million renovation brought the building to modern accessibility standards, improved energy efficiency, made seismic improvements, and restored historical architectural details that had been altered over time.

== Current use ==
Since 1961, Chapman Hall has been the home of the Clark Honors College.
