= King Albert Hall (Portland State University) =

Building on the Portland State University campus in Portland, Oregon, U.S.

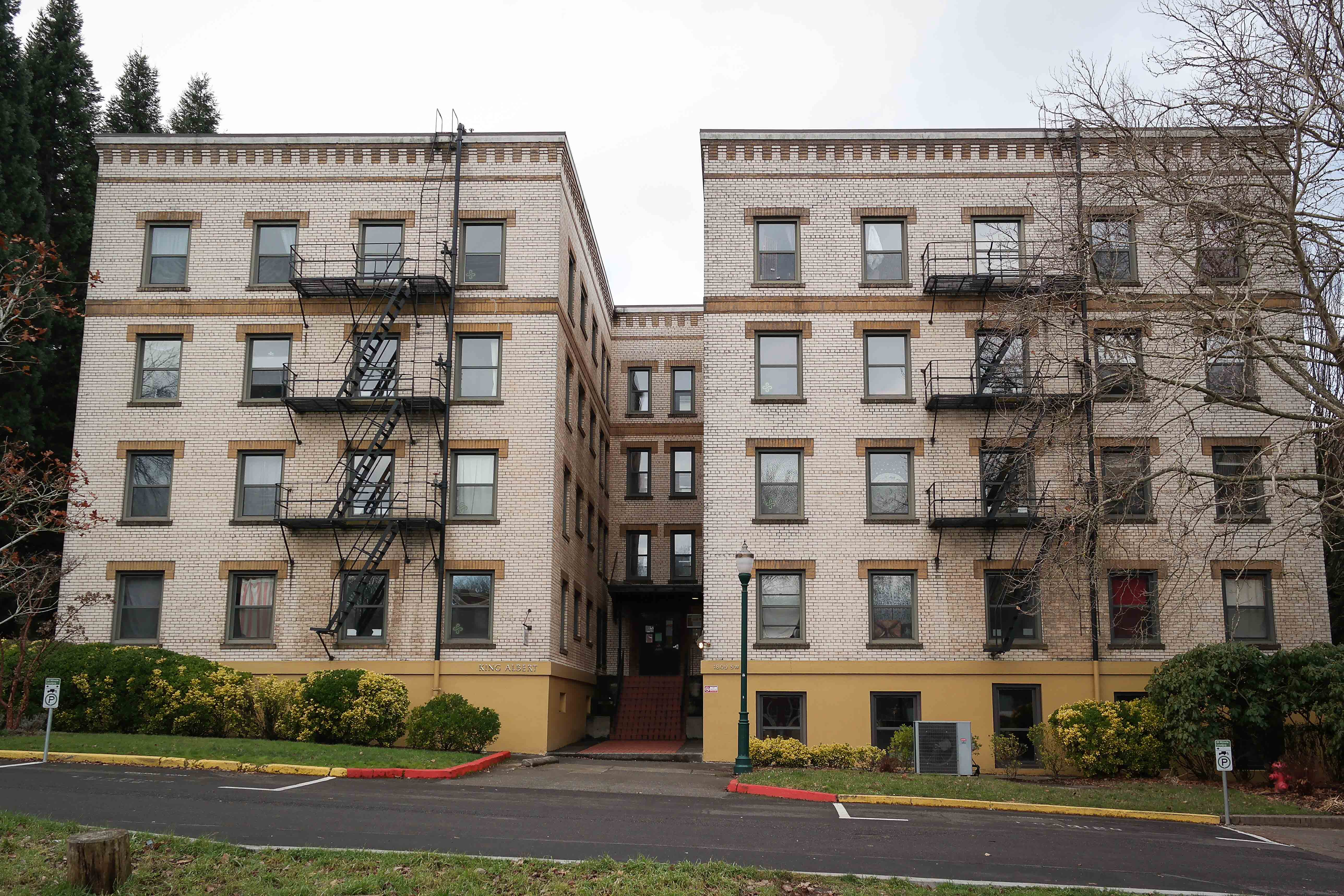
- King Albert Hall in 2014

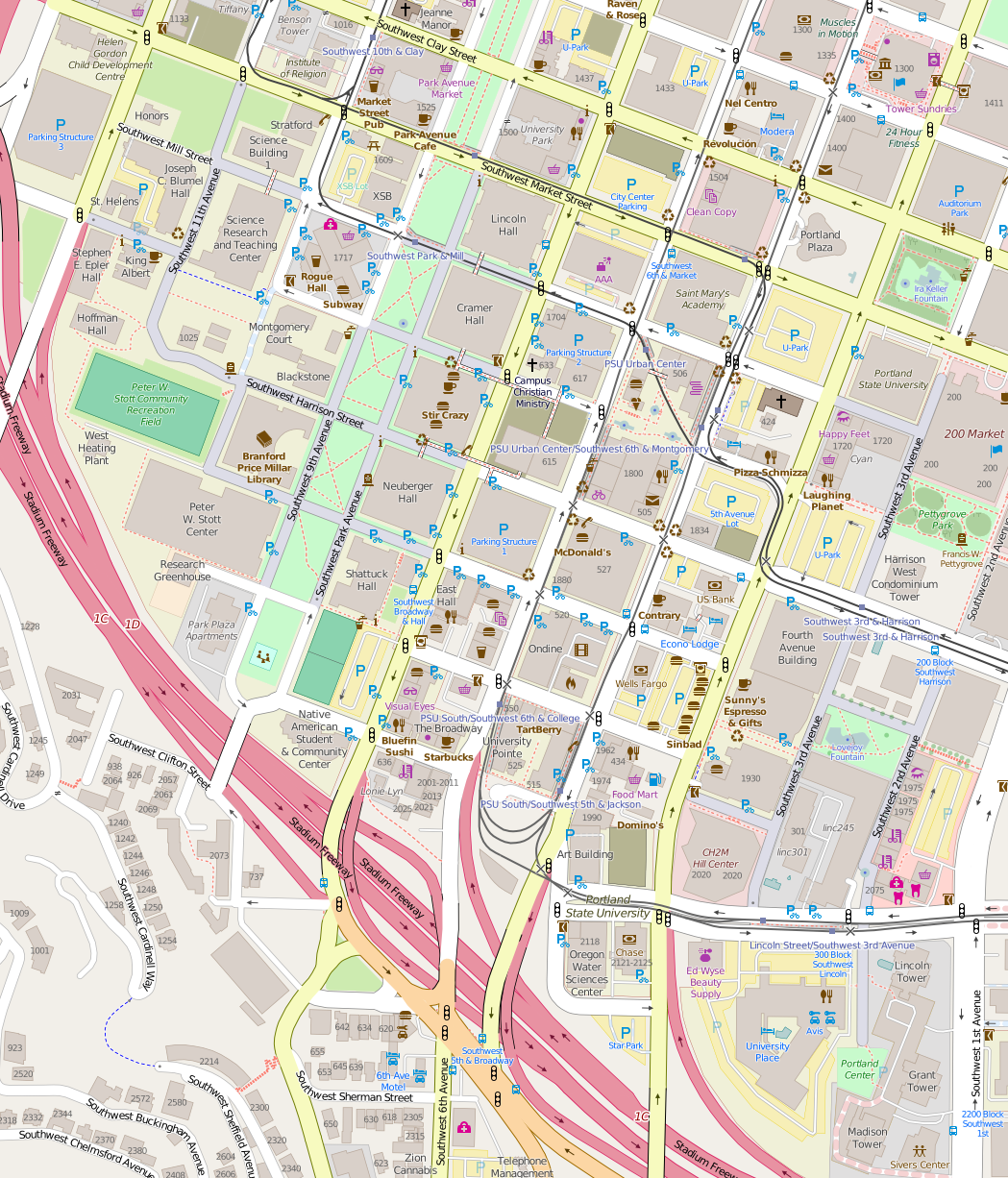
- Location within Portland State University OR
- Former names: King Albert Apartments

General information
- Type: Student housing
- Architectural style: Mediterranean Revival
- Location: 1809 Southwest 11th Avenue, Portland, Oregon
- Coordinates: 45.512819°N 122.687366°W
- Opened: February 1918
- Cost: $125,000
- Landlord: Portland State University

Design and construction
- Architect: I.A. Peters

Website
- PDX.EDU

King Albert Hall was a 64-unit student residence hall at Portland State University in Portland, Oregon, in the United States. The four-story brick building included studio apartments with kitchens, a student coffee shop, and laundry facilities.

== History ==
King Albert Apartments opened in February 1918, on the southwest corner of 11th and Montgomery. The address was 385 11th Street but was changed to 1809 SW 11th Avenue according to the 1933 street renumbering system. The name King Albert may have been chosen to honor World War I hero Albert I of Belgium. Owner Herbert Gordon, a real estate developer and member of the Oregon House of Representatives, sold the property soon after completion to A.C. Ruby, a breeder of thoroughbred horses. At a cost of $125,000, the building contained 51 three-room apartments and 16 two-room apartments. Advertisements emphasized "strictly modern" units with hardwood floors, tile baths, dressing rooms, and elevator access.

After the death of A.C. Ruby, ownership of the property passed to A.C. Ruby Jr., and in 1934 the building was part of a $250,000 title transfer whereby C.R. Reed, a breeder of thoroughbred horses, acquired the King Albert Apartments in exchange for the Davenport Farm in Silverton, Oregon. The farm had been the boyhood home of Homer Davenport.

In 1969, the property became part of student housing at Portland State University. In the fall of 2023, the building was demolished, and the plan for the site is currently unknown, though there is potential to rebuild a residential building.
