= The Duck Store =

Bookstore at the University of Oregon

Coordinates: 44.04569°N 123.07883°W

University of Oregon Bookstore

The Duck Store is the bookstore for the University of Oregon in Eugene, Oregon, United States. It is a not-for-profit corporation governed by an elected board of directors composed mostly of students. It is independent of the University of Oregon as the UO does not own or operate any retail stores and has no role in the management or operation of The Duck Store or receive any profits (rather, the UO directly receives compensation in the form of licensing fees, as The Duck Store is an officially licensed Oregon Ducks retailer).

The Duck Store serves primarily students, faculty, staff and alumni of the University of Oregon. It is governed by an eleven-member board composed of current University of Oregon staff, faculty, and the executive team.

In addition to its main location, there are several other stores across the state that predominantly sell sportswear and memorabilia. In Eugene there are stores at Autzen Stadium, Valley River Center, and when games are hosted at Autzen Stadium and Matthew Knight Arena each has a specialty store that opens. In Portland there is a store at Clackamas Town Center.

== History ==
The first University of Oregon bookstore was organized by the Associated Students of the University of Oregon (ASUO) in 1916 in a rented house that was on the site of the present store. After World War I, the ASUO found itself in financial difficulty and sold the bookstore to a local druggist.

By 1920, it became clear that the university needed a bookstore, and a supporter from Portland, stationer J. K. Gill, set up the University of Oregon Co-operative Society. Stock in a separate corporation, the University Supply Company, was sold to department heads and faculty, including university president Prince Lucien Campbell. By 1933, the bookstore was financially solvent and the supply company was dissolved. Despite the financial challenges of the Great Depression and declining university enrollment during World War II, the co-op persevered.

The bookstore changed locations several times. In 1955, the co-op purchased the property at 13th and Kincaid where it was already operating. In 1959, the board of directors voted to buy the College Side Inn, which was located at 13th and Kincaid streets, the site of the present Duck Store location, cementing its independence. A new building was completed in 1961, with several additions being made to it since then.

Today, The Duck Store operates multiple storefronts across Oregon as an independent 501(c)(3) non-profit.
