= University of Oregon College of Design =

Art school at the University of Oregon

Coordinates: 44.046992°N 123.074707°W

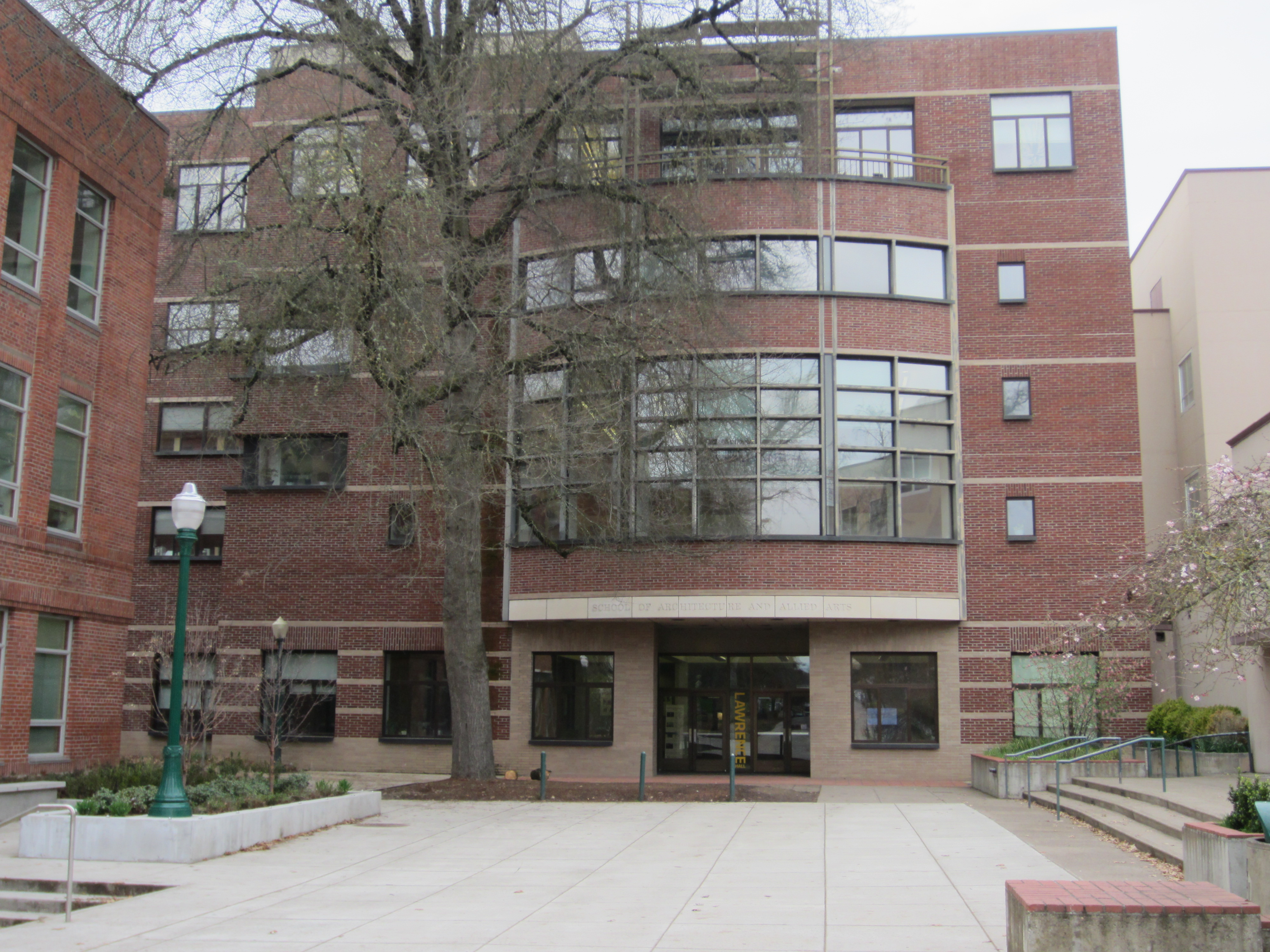
- Lawrence Hall, the main building of UO Design
- Type: Public
- Established: 1914
- Dean: Adrian Parr
- Location: Eugene, Oregon, United States
- Website: http://design.uoregon.edu/

The University of Oregon College of Design (UO Design) is a public college of architecture and visual arts in the U.S. state of Oregon. Founded in 1914 by Ellis F. Lawrence, the college is located on the University of Oregon campus in Eugene, off the corner of 13th and University streets, and also has programs at the historic White Stag Block in Portland, Oregon.

== History ==
At its inception in 1914, Ellis F. Lawrence envisioned that the School of Architecture and Allied Arts (now the College of Design) would incorporate architectural education with the arts as opposed to engineering, and became the first school to do so. The students would learn in an individual but collaborative environment instead of a fiercely competitive environment.

When Walter R. B. Willcox became the head of the architecture curriculum in 1922, the underlying idea became that architecture and the arts would reflect societal influences, which had remained alive through the decades.

After World War II, student enrollment in the school ballooned and separate departments for each curricular subject were created.

Renowned Canadian architect Arthur Erickson spent one academic year at UO in the mid-1950s as an assistant professor.

Douglas Shadbolt, a noted Canadian architectural educator, completed his B.Arch degree at UO in 1957. Shadbolt would go on to help found Dalhousie University's School of Architecture in 1961 and Carleton University's School of Architecture in 1968, serving as founding director of both programs. Shadbolt would also later serve as the director of UBC's School of Architecture.

In the Spring of 2017 it was announced that the school would rename itself the College of Design.

== Programs ==
The college is divided into three schools and one department: School of Architecture & Environment, School of Art + Design, School of Planning, Public Policy and Management, and the Department of the History of Art and Architecture.

=== School of Architecture & Environment ===
The architecture program was in place since the inception of the school, though it didn’t become a department of the school until 1964. Just five years after its founding, in 1919, the school gained an early form of accreditation through the Association of Collegiate Schools of Architecture. Only twelve schools out of forty schools that applied obtained accreditation that year. Undergraduate and graduate degrees are accredited by the National Architectural Accrediting Board and had been the only school in the state of Oregon to be accredited until Portland State University earned its accreditation in 2013.

The landscape architecture program was first founded in Oregon Agricultural College, now known as Oregon State University in 1928. The program was moved to the University of Oregon in 1932, where it was expanded into a five-year program. The masters program was established a year later.

=== School of Art + Design ===
The School of Art + Design offers an array of fine arts including various digital media, ceramics, fibers, metals and jewelry, photography, painting, and sculpture. Students’ work is periodically displayed in the LaVerne Krause Gallery in Lawrence Hall. In 2023, the Master of Fine Arts (MFA) in Art graduate program celebrated its 100 year anniversary and is seen as one of the oldest programs in the country. In 2026, the MFA program earned the distinction of being one of the thirty-four best MFA programs in the country, alongside Cornell University, Fashion Institute of Technology, University of Chicago, University of Georgia, and University of Southern California by US News and World Report. It is one of the top four graduate programs at the University of Oregon.

The product design program began in the fall of 2008, from a partnership between the school’s department of art and the interior architecture program. The program, sparked by a $1.5 million donation from Columbia Sportswear CEO Tim Boyle, works with firms such as Ziba Design, Nike, Intel, and Sandstrom Design. The department offers a four-year BFA degree in product design as well as a master of science in Sports Product Design in Portland.

=== School of Planning, Public Policy and Management ===
The School of Planning, Public Policy and Management offers degrees in community and regional planning, public administration, and nonprofit management. The school is known as affectionately PPPM or 3PM locally. PPPM became a school in 2017 when the College of Design was created from AAA.

The Department of Planning, Public Policy and Management was officially established in 1982. It was created from the merger of the Wallace School of Community Service and Public Affairs (CSPA) and the Department of Urban and Regional Planning. The new department was located in the School of Architecture and Allied Arts to form PPPM. The department was authorized to offer the University's accredited professional master's degrees in urban planning, public administration public affairs as well as the BA/BS in planning, public policy and management. The Wallace School was created in 1967 with a generous donation of $1 million from Lila Acheson Wallace, the co-founder of Reader's Digest. The Wallace School housed the Bureau of Government Research and Service. The Bureau was established as the Bureau of Municipal Research and Service in 1933. Herman Kehrli was the founding direct of the Bureau.

== Facilities ==
The college is primarily housed in Lawrence Hall at the University of Oregon campus, which provides lecture halls, classrooms, studios, the Design Library, a materials resource library, and a computer lab with plotting services. The college also occupies the University's facility in the White Stag Block in Portland, with classes in urban architecture, historic preservation, product design, and sports product design. The LaVerne Krause Gallery in Lawrence Hall displays selected student work.

== Rankings ==
The journal DesignIntelligence, in its 2010 rankings of architecture schools, ranked the University of Oregon's undergraduate architecture program number 7 overall in the nation. It also ranked first in the country in the area of "Sustainable Design Practice and Principles," and number 5 for "Analysis and Planning." This was an 11-spot improvement from the 2009 rankings where the architecture program was also ranked first place, tying with University of California at Berkeley, in the category of skills assessment for sustainable design concepts and principles. In 2007, the landscape architecture program was ranked first in the nation in sustainable design, while the architecture and interior architecture programs were ranked second in sustainable design.

Several programs have historically been ranked highly in various publications over the years. U.S. News & World Report ranked the graduate architecture program at number 15 in their 1998 edition of ‘’Best Graduate Schools’’. The journal DesignIntelligence annually ranks architecture programs in the United States in its issue "America's Best Architecture & Design Schools" and the undergraduate architecture program has consistently ranked within the top 15 and as high as 11 between 2004 and 2008. The undergraduate and graduate interior architecture programs were ranked 10th and 6th, respectively. The undergraduate and graduate landscape architecture programs were tied at 15th and ranked 13th, respectively.

In the more regionalized rankings, DesignIntelligence in 2007 had ranked the graduate architecture program at first in the western region, tied with Southern California Institute of Architecture. The undergraduate program had placed second in the western region behind California Polytechnic State University in the same publication. The interior architecture program ranked first in both graduate and undergraduate in the western region and undergraduate landscape architecture ranked third.

== Notable alumni ==
- Howard Backen, BArch (1962), founder of BAR Architects and Backen, Gillam & Kroeger
- Brad Cloepfil, BArch (1980), founder of Allied Works Architecture
- Tinker Hatfield, BArch (1977), VP, designer and architect for Nike
- Thomas Hubka
- Joe Hutshing
- Mazharul Islam, BArch (1952), architect credited with bringing modernist architecture to Bangladesh
- James Ivory
- Christopher Judge
- LaVerne Krause
- Chang-Rae Lee
- Alan Lowe
- Rick Mather, B.IArch (1961), RIBA, Founder of Rick Mather Architects, Trustee of Victoria and Albert Museum
- Jason F. McLennan, BArch (1997), creator of the Living Building Challenge and CEO of McLennan Design
- Sarah Susanka
- Eugene Tsui
- Ron Wigginton
- Daniel Wu
