= University of Oregon Graduate Teaching Fellows Federation =

Graduate Teaching Fellows Federation
- University of Oregon Graduate Teaching Fellows Federation
- Founded: 1976
- Headquarters: Eugene, Oregon
- Location: United States
- Parent organization: American Federation of Teachers
- Affiliations: AFL–CIO, Coalition of Graduate Employee Unions

The Graduate Teaching Fellows Federation (GTFF) is a graduate student union at the University of Oregon (UO) established in 1976 to represent graduate student workers (Graduate Teaching Fellows or GTFs), and it is one of the oldest graduate student unions in the United States. Developed out of the earlier Graduate Student Employees Association, the UO administration objected to the establishment of the union, citing that graduate workers were "not public employees", but were rather "primarily students receiving a form of financial aid similar to stipends or scholarships."

The Oregon Employment Relations Board (ERB) ruled in favor of the graduate students and supported their right to organize. The GTFF began organizing its first contract in April 1977 with the University of Oregon administration. The negotiations reached an impasse in 1978, and it was not until after two strike votes that an agreement was reached. In 1989, the GTFF secured subsidies for health insurance, which was expanded in 1993 to be fully employer-paid, one of the first such programs offered to graduate teachers in the United States.

== 2013 bargaining cycle ==
Contract bargaining takes place every two years. In November 2013, contract bargaining began. In 2014, after more than a year of bargaining on behalf of the 1500 GTF workers on campus, contract negotiations came to another impasse. On December 2, 2014, University of Oregon GTFs went on strike right before finals week. The GTFF was bargaining for increased wages and paid parental/medical leave. GTFs teach 1/3 of all undergraduate classes, 18% of all lectures, 82% of all labs, and 95% of all discussion sections. The strike has resulted in disruption of undergraduate classes and finals schedules. The strike was resolved after eight days following 22 hours of continuous mediation.
