= University of Oregon =

Public university in Eugene, Oregon, US

- Latin: Universitas Oregonensis
- Former name: Oregon State University (1876–1877)
- Motto: Mens agitat molem (Latin)
- Motto in English: "The Mind Moves Mountains" / (lit.) "Mind moves the mass"
- Type: Public research university
- Established: October 12, 1872; 154 years ago (established); October 16, 1876; 150 years ago (opened)
- Accreditation: NWCCU
- Academic affiliations: AAU; APRU; HECC; URA; Space-grant
- Endowment: $1.84 billion (2025)
- Budget: $1.45 billion (2024–25)
- President: Karl Scholz
- Provost: Christopher P. Long
- Students: 24,448 (fall 2025)
- Undergraduates: 20,711 (fall 2025)
- Postgraduates: 3,737 (fall 2025)
- Location: Eugene, Oregon, United States; 44.0443°N 123.0758°W
- Campus: 295 acres (1.19 km^{2}); Midsize city
- Other campuses: Bend; Charleston; Portland; Online
- Newspaper: Daily Emerald
- Colors: Green and yellow
- Nickname: Ducks
- Sporting affiliations: NCAA Division I FBS – Big Ten; MPSF; NCATA
- Mascot: The Oregon Duck
- Website: uoregon.edu

The University of Oregon (UO, U of O or Oregon) is a public research university in Eugene, Oregon, United States. Founded in 1876, the university is organized into nine colleges and schools and offers 420 undergraduate and graduate degree programs. The university also operates the Ballmer Institute for Children's Behavioral Health in Portland, Oregon; the Oregon Institute of Marine Biology in Charleston, Oregon; and Pine Mountain Observatory in Central Oregon.

UO's 295-acre campus is situated along the Willamette River. Most academic programs follow the 10-week quarter system. The university is classified among "R1: Doctoral Universities – Very high research activity" and is a member of the Association of American Universities. Since July 2014, UO has been governed by its own board of trustees.

UO student-athletes compete as the Oregon Ducks and are part of the Big Ten Conference in the NCAA Division I. With eighteen varsity teams, the Oregon Ducks are best known for their football team and track and field program. These two teams are even incorporated into the design of the school's "O" logo. In the summer of 2022, UO hosted the 2022 World Athletics Championships. It was the first time the event was held in the United States.

The university has a long and complex relationship with Nike, Inc., and the firm's co-founder Phil Knight. As a consequence of state higher-education disinvestment starting in the 1990s, UO has embraced a "University of Nike" image. Fueled by large investments in athletic infrastructure, this trend has accelerated in recent years. Knight, an alumnus, has advocated for both athletic prominence and increased privatisation of the university, and has donated over $2 billion to UO since the late-1980s, much of it going towards athletics. The school's "O" logo was designed by Nike in 1998 and sports facility projects on campus typically involve both Knight and Nike.

== History ==
=== Establishment ===
Prior to the establishment of the university in 1872, most of Oregon's colleges were denominational. While the Oregon State Legislature drafted a bill in 1872 to form the university, a citizens group from Eugene, the Union University Association (UUA), formed and began campaigning to make the university non-denominational. During a legislative meeting in September 1872, the UUA would succeed in amending the bill to include a non-denominational clause. The bill eventually was passed by the state legislature in 1872, establishing the institution as Oregon State University. The residents of Eugene raised $27,500 to buy eighteen acres of land at a cost of $2,500.

=== Early years ===
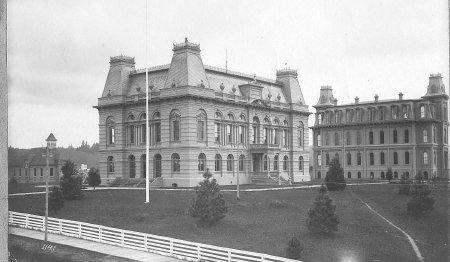
University and Villard Halls, the first two buildings on campus

The university opened in 1876 under the name of "Oregon State University" and University Hall as its sole building. The first year of enrollment contained 155 students taught by five faculty members. The first graduating class was in 1878, graduating five students. In 1881, the university was nearly closed; it was $8,000 in debt before Henry Villard donated $7,000 to help pay it. In 1913 and 1932, there were proposals to merge the university with what is now Oregon State University. Both proposals were defeated.

=== Maturity as a university ===
During Prince Lucien Campbell's tenure as president from 1902 to 1925, the university experienced tremendous growth. The budget, enrollment, facilities, and faculty members all grew several times its amount prior to his presidency. Numerous schools were also established during his tenure, including the School of Music in 1902, the School of Education in 1910, the School of Architecture, the College of Business in 1914, the School of Law in 1915, the School of Journalism in 1916, and the School of Health and Physical Education in 1920. However, the University of Oregon lost its School of Engineering to Oregon Agricultural College, now known as Oregon State University.

Historical total enrollment

Year	Pop.
1880	185
1900	330
1920	1,897
1940	3,948
1960	8,330
1980	17,379
1985	16,375

Year	Pop.
1990	18,141
1995	17,138
2000	17,843
2005	20,394
2010	23,389
2015	24,125
2020	21,800

Note: Medical School enrollment transferred to OHSU circa 1980.
Enrollment numbers include both undergraduate and graduate students.
Source: IR

In 1917, a "three term" (quarter system) calendar was adopted by the university faculty as a war-time measure. This academic calendar has remained ever since then. However, it is now referred to as the Quarter System.

The Zorn-MacPherson Bill in 1932 proposed the University of Oregon and Oregon State College (now "University") merge. The bill lost in a landslide vote of over 6 to 1. The University of Oregon Medical School was founded in 1887 in Portland and merged with Willamette University's program in 1913. However, in 1974 it became an independent institution known as Oregon Health Sciences University.

The Institute of Molecular Biology was established at the university in 1959.

UO served as the filming location for the 1978 cult classic National Lampoon's Animal House.

==== Golden age ====
The 60s and 70s were somewhat of a golden age for the university. In 1964, the university ranked 25th nationally in National Science Foundation basic research grants, ahead of the University of Rochester, Northwestern University, the University of Colorado and the University of Pittsburgh.

In 1969, the UO was admitted into the Association of American Universities, along with Case Western Reserve University, the University of Maryland, and the University of Southern California.

Graduate enrollment peaked during the 1978-79 academic year at 4,568. From 1970 to 1979, 2,614 doctoral degrees were awarded at UO cumulatively.

From 1970 to 1979, 817 UO undergraduate students would go on to earn doctoral degrees at UO or another institution. Despite increases in total undergraduate enrollment since the 60s and 70s, fewer UO undergraduate students would go on to earn doctorates in the 80s, 90s, 2000s and 2010s.

Decade	Average total enrolment	Average undergraduate enrolment	Average graduate enrolment	Doctoral degrees awarded	UO undergraduates who earned doctorate in USA
1960s	12,804			1,203	372
1970s	16,252	12,160	4,092	2,614	817
1980s	16,830	12,849	3,981	1,889	612
1990s	17,015	13,477	3,538	1,883	725
2000s	20,232	16,343	3,889	1,528	710
2010s	23,727	20,037	3,690	1,580	810

Prominent UO researchers of this era include Michael Posner, Frank Stahl, George Streisinger and Aaron Novick.

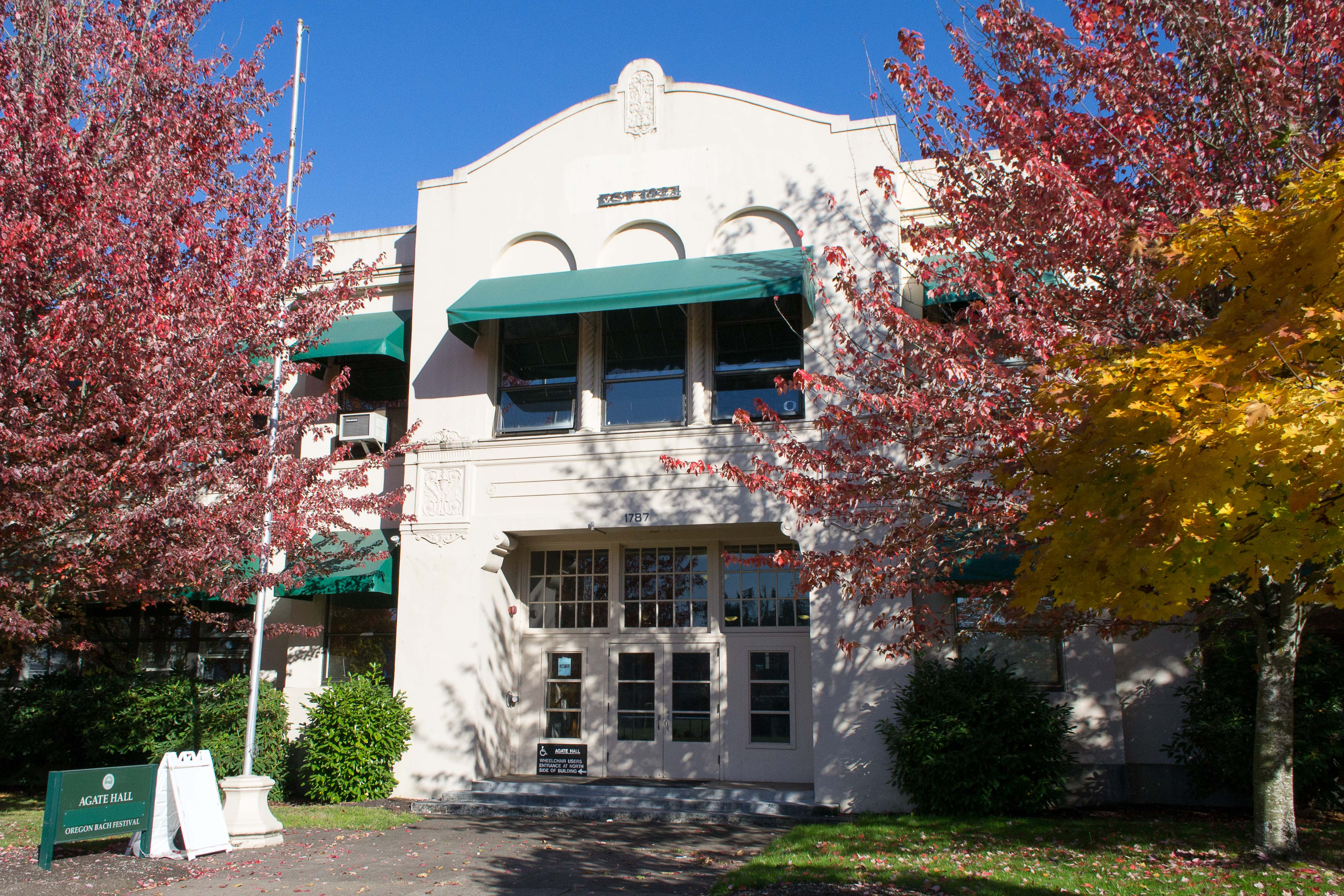
Agate Hall

UO experienced state disinvestment in the 1980s during the tenure of president Paul Olum. Further state disinvestment occurred during the 1990s and during the Great Recession. Many programs have been scaled back or eliminated.

In June 2025, the American English Institute was closed. Based in Agate Hall, this unit of the arts and sciences college had been providing three different ESL (English as a Second Language) courses since 1978: the Intensive English Program (IEP), Academic English for International Students (AEIS), and Distance Education.

=== Recent history ===
In recent years UO's administration and Board of Trustees have approved hundreds of millions of dollars in construction projects. These facilities include Matthew Knight Arena, the Ford Alumni Center, the EMU renovation (student union building), and dormitories. This has occurred in tandem with state budget reductions, tuition increases, and increases in out-of-state enrollment.

In 2016, the university removed the name of Frederic Stanley Dunn, head of the Classics department in the 1920s and 30s, from the dormitory Dunn Hall, because of his leading role in the Ku Klux Klan.

==== Declining state support ====
Measure 5 established limits on property taxes in Oregon. This impacted the state budget, and led to budget and programmatic cuts at UO starting the 1990s. The College of Human Performance and Development was closed. Furthermore, many of the school's primary and secondary teacher training programs were eliminated. By 1997, more than 20 other programs were closed or significantly reduced in size.

UO has initiated three capital campaigns in the last 30 years. The first campaign of this era was launched with a goal of $150 million. It ended up raising a total of $255.3 million between 1992 and 1998.

With financial support from the state dwindling from 40% to 13% of the university budget, in January 2001, University President Dave Frohnmayer began Campaign Oregon with the goal of raising $600 million by December 2008, the most ambitious philanthropic fundraising campaign in the state's history at the time. With contributions exceeding $100 million from benefactors such as Phil Knight and Lorry I. Lokey, the campaign goal was exceeded by over $253 million.

In the fall of 2014, the institution announced that it would attempt to raise $2 billion from donors. In the fall of 2018, the campaign revised its goal to $3 billion. Substantial gifts were donated by Phil Knight and his wife. In October 2016, it was announced Phil Knight and his wife Penny will contribute $500 million to establish the Phil and Penny Knight Campus for Accelerating Scientific Impact. At the time it was the largest donation to a public research university. Knight gave an additional $500 million to the Knight Campus in 2021.

In 2022, Steve Ballmer made a large gift of $425 million to fund a new institute for children's behavioral health.

Despite the recent influx in private gifts given by mega-donors, as of 2020, UO's state subsidy per resident student is one of the lowest in both the Association of American Universities and Pac-12 Conference.

==== "University of Nike" ====
The school's "O" logo was officially adopted by the university as a whole in 2002. Designed by Nike, it was first adopted by the athletic program in late-1998. The inside of the logo is said to depict Hayward Field, the institution's track and field venue. The outside of the logo is said to represent Autzen Stadium, which is UO's football stadium.

The "O" logo was designed by Nike

Phil Knight has financed hundreds of millions of dollars' worth of construction projects on UO's campus going back to the late-1980s. Knight contributed to the renovation and expansion of the Main Library, now called the Knight Library, and the construction of the William W. Knight Law Center. Knight did not make a major contribution to academics between 1996 and 2016.

Knight is an athletic booster. He has contributed to, and managed, the construction of various athletic department facilities. Knight's involvement in said projects usually does not involve any university oversight, making them controversial. Knight also financed the majority of the Hayward Field renovation project.

Major publications including the New York Times and Wall Street Journal have described the university as the "University of Nike". A book titled The University of Nike, written by Joshua Hunt, describes Nike and Phil Knight's influence on the university.

As of 2022, 16.5% of UO's gross square footage is purpose-built for the university's sports programs.

==== Push for independence ====
In 2010, the newly installed UO president, Richard Lariviere, proposed establishing a new governance and funding model for UO. The New Partnership, as it became known, sought to establish an independent board and large endowment to fund the university into the future. Funding had become too low and unpredictable for UO officials, and the new model would provide the university with a consistent stream of funding and the legal freedom to borrow money for large capital projects. Lariviere's proposal called for $800 million in state bonds and "an equal amount" of private gifts. The new funds would provide a large boost to UO's then modest endowment.

In a 2010 interview, UO booster Phil Knight discussed the New Partnership. Knight explained that Lariviere's plan would allow UO greater control and possibly allow it to set its own tuition for in-state students.

Oh, I talk to [Lariviere] on a regular basis. I spoke with him a couple of days ago. He was mostly talking about -- his view is the next step to upgrade the academic side of the university is to get the Legislature to go along with his plan, which is a little bit complicated, but it's to take a step -- I hate to use the word because it's an oversimplification -- but to take a step toward becoming more of a private university. I think the state provides about 7 percent of the funding now, so basically it is a private university that's hamstrung by public policy ... He's hamstrung in the sense he can't charge more tuition than the Legislature will let him do for in-state kids. So he loses money on every state kid that enrolls in the University of Oregon and he makes money on every kid that comes from out of state. So, increasingly, it's become the University of California at Eugene. That's the result of the current Legislature's policies.

— Phil Knight (2010)

On March 31, 2012, a Political Action Committee called Oregonians For Higher Education Excellence was formed by Columbia Sportswear CEO Tim Boyle. As of May 23, 2012, the organization has raised over $320,000. Notable contributors to the PAC include, Phil Knight, Patrick Kilkenny, and Tim Boyle. According to Boyle, the PAC's stated goal was to help facilitate an increase in autonomy at the University of Oregon.

In reaction to a growing movement to establish an independent university board, the Oregon Legislature in 2013 passed SB 270, requiring local governing boards for the state's three largest institutions. In 2014, the University of Oregon became an independent public body governed by the Board of Trustees of the University of Oregon. Proponents of local governing boards claimed that an independent board would give the university more autonomy and free it from inadequate state funding. This change of the board structure that eventually allowed the University of Oregon to leave the Pac12 and move to the Big10 without consideration for other state-funded universities in the state, i.e. Oregon State.

Michael H. Schill became the university's president in the summer of 2015. In June 2015, UO's endowment surpassed the $700 million mark. In 2022, Schill became president at Northwestern University. Karl Scholz has been president since July 1, 2023.

== Campus ==
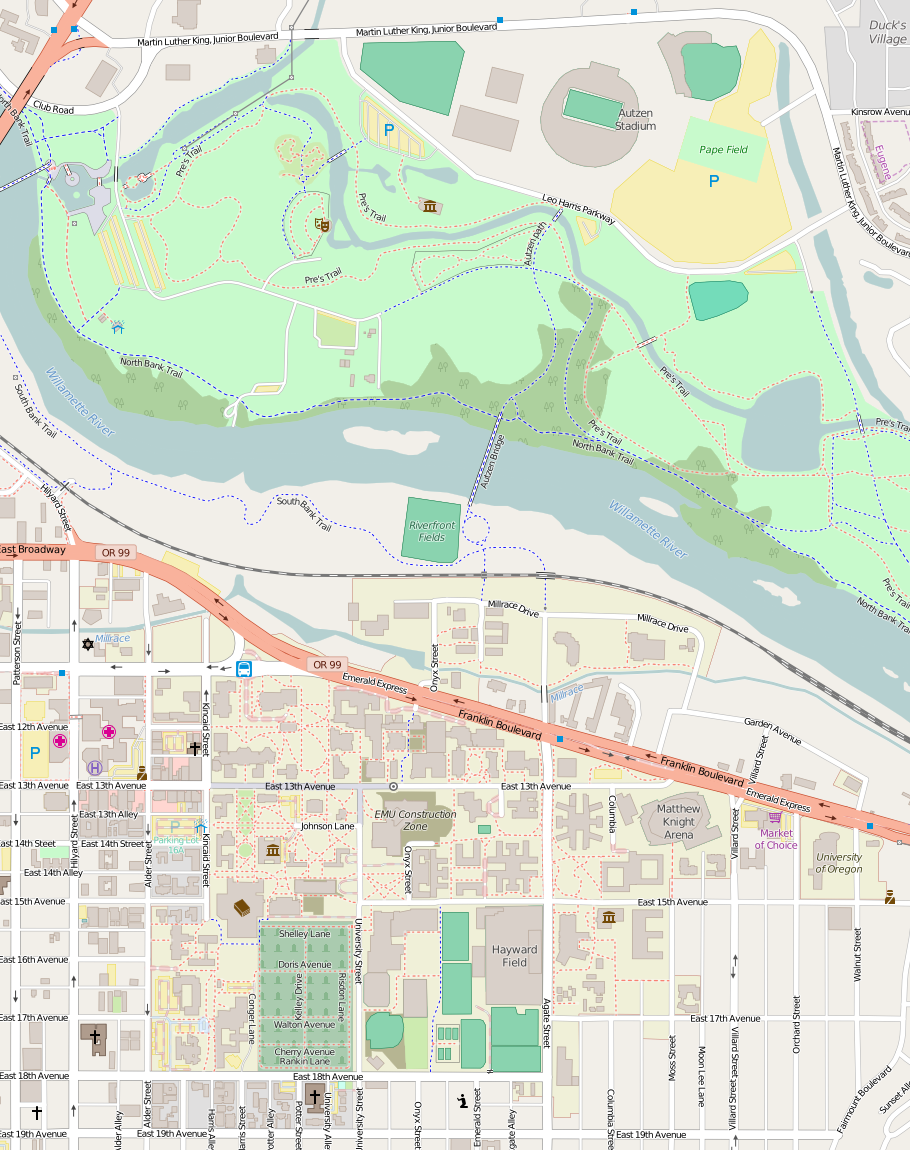
Map of the campus

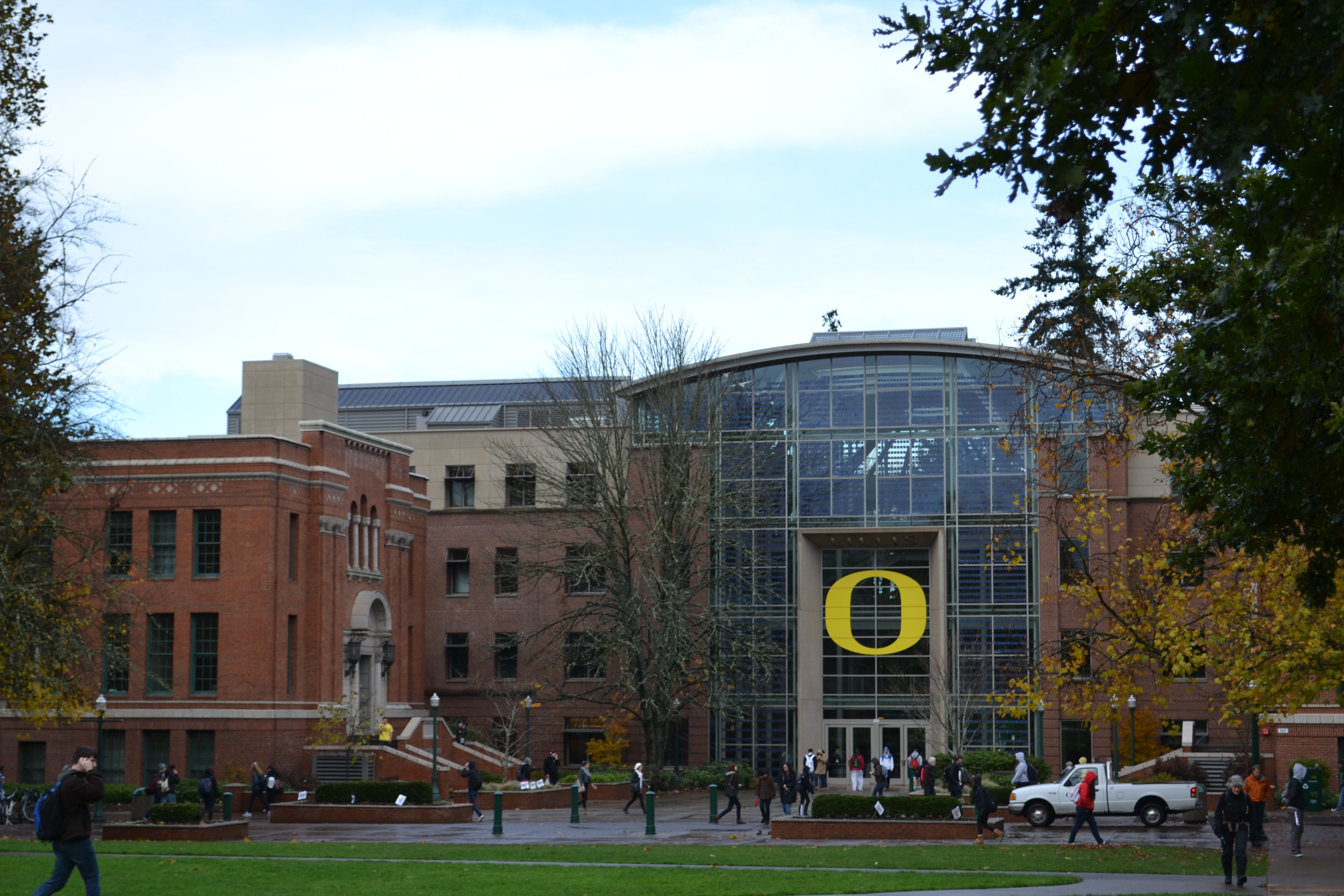
Lillis Business Complex

The campus is spread over 295 acres (119 ha) and includes eighty buildings. Additionally, the campus is an arboretum consisting of 500 species of trees. In total there are over 3,000 trees on campus. It is adjacent to the West University neighborhood and Pioneer Cemetery. Eugene is near many prominent geographic features such as the Willamette River, the Cascade Mountain Range, and the Pacific Ocean. Also, within a two-hour drive is the Portland metropolitan area.

The campus is occupied by approximately 80 buildings. However, there are several ongoing construction projects, as well as plans to build new facilities. The campus is the home of the Oregon Bach Festival.

Based on Ellis F. Lawrence's vision, many of the university's buildings are planned around several major quadrangles, many of which abut the 13th Avenue pedestrian mall. The university is known for being the site of a pioneering participatory planning experiment known as the Oregon Experiment, which is also the subject of a book of the same name that evolved into the well known book A Pattern Language by Christopher Alexander. The project's two major principles are buildings should be designed, in part, by the people who will use them with the help of an "architect facilitator", and construction should occur over many small projects as opposed to a few large ones.

Although academic buildings are spread throughout the campus, most are along East 13th Avenue, with heavy pedestrian traffic at the intersection with Kincaid Street. Student recreation and union centers are toward the center of the campus, with residence halls on the east side. Sports facilities are grouped in the southern-central part of campus with the Autzen Stadium and PK Park complexes across the Willamette River. The university also owns and operates several satellite facilities, including a large facility in the White Stag Block of downtown Portland and the Oregon Institute of Marine Biology in Charleston, Oregon.

The University of Oregon is home to the Jordan Schnitzer Museum of Art and the Museum of Natural and Cultural History.

The campus has been smoke and tobacco free since 2012.

=== Old campus and memorial quad ===
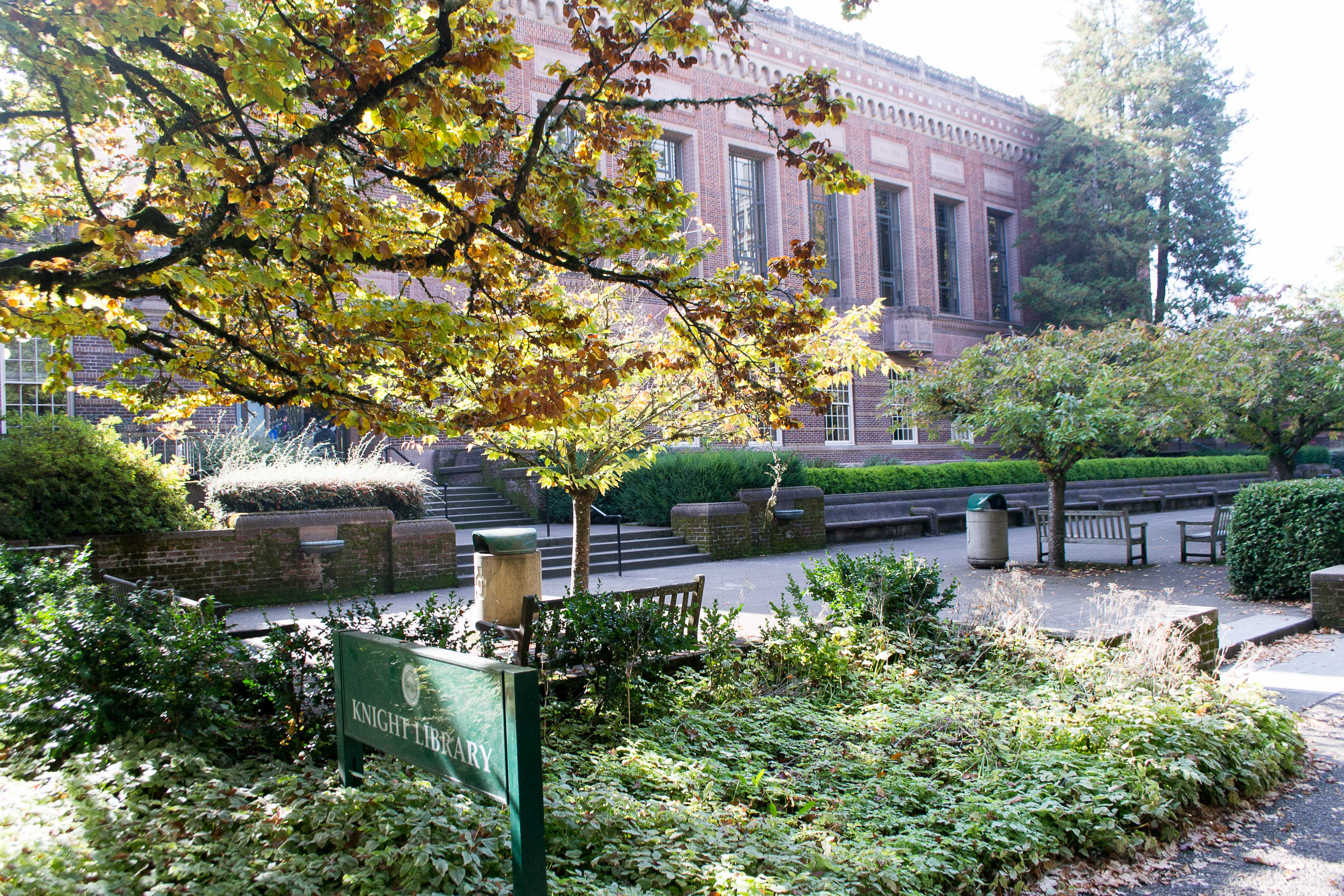
Knight Library

The oldest section of campus is in the northwest area of the current campus. The university's first building, University Hall, opened on October 16, 1876, when the university had an enrollment of 177 students. It was known as "the building" before being named after Judge Matthew Deady in 1893. In June 2020, Deady's name was removed from the building in and it was temporarily renamed University Hall. The second building on campus is known as Villard Hall and is home to the Theater Arts and Comparative Literature Departments. Completed in 1886, the hall was named after railroad magnate Henry Villard, who provided financial aid to the university in 1881. Before its naming, it was known as "the new building". Both University and Villard Halls were designated National Historic Landmarks in 1977.

Just south of Old Campus is the Memorial Quad, which runs north and south along Kincaid Street, capped at both ends by the main campus library, Knight Library, on the south side, and the Lillis Business Complex on the north. It is flanked on the west by the tallest building on campus, Prince Lucien Campbell Hall, also known as "PLC", Condon Hall on the west, housing the Geography department, and the Jordan Schnitzer Museum of Art on the east, which was remodeled and reopened on January 23, 2005. Also adjacent to Memorial Quad is Chapman Hall, which houses the Robert D. Clark Honors College.

=== Central campus ===
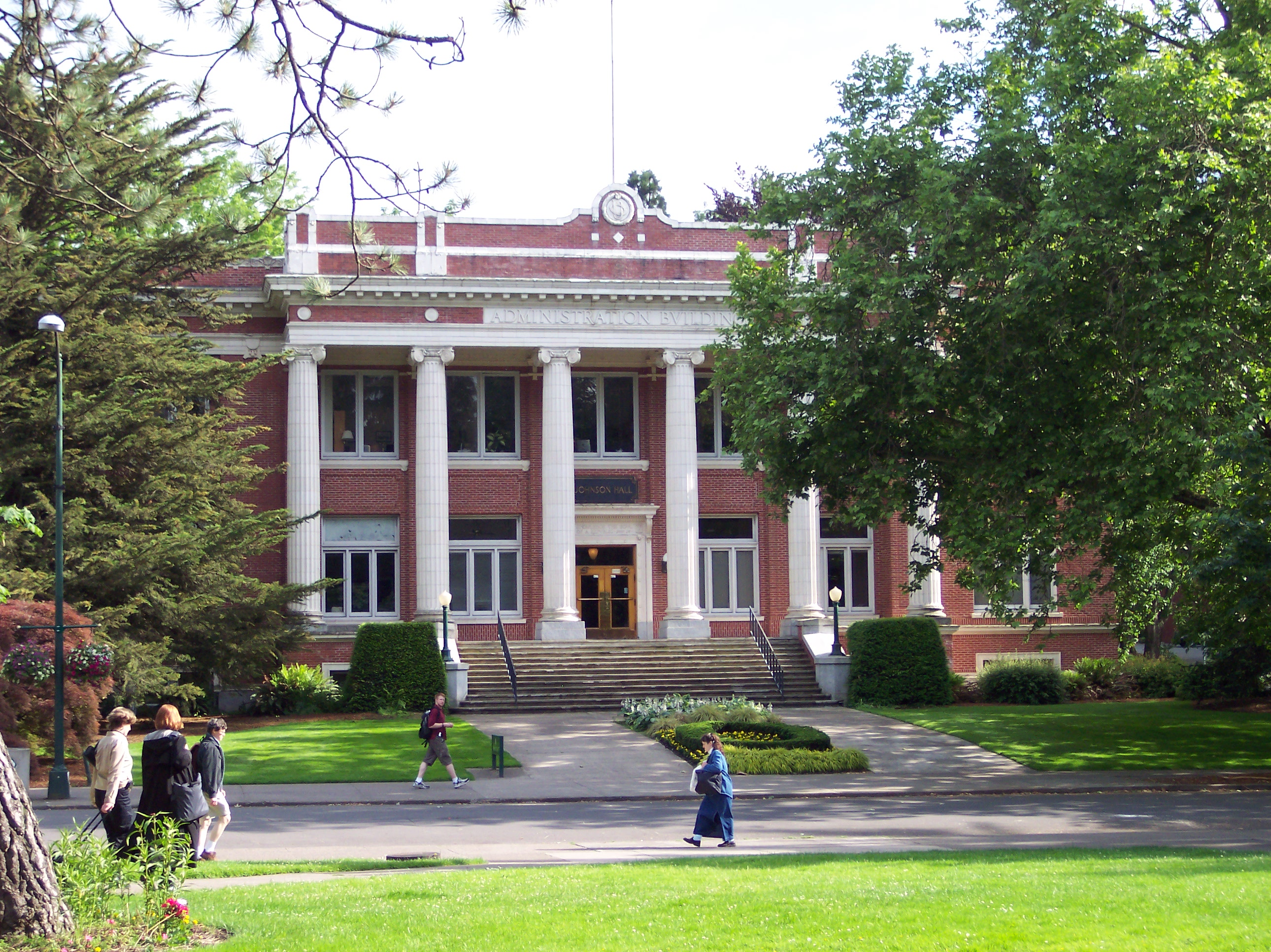
Johnson Hall

The center of campus houses a mixture of academic buildings, an administration building, and student recreation buildings. Just to the east of Memorial Quad and facing 13th Avenue is Johnson Hall, where offices for higher administration and trustee offices are found, including the offices of the university president. Directly across 13th Avenue and facing Johnson Hall is The Pioneer, a statue of a bearded, buckskin-clad pioneer cast in bronze by sculptor Alexander Phimister Proctor in 1919. In 1932, Proctor's Pioneer Mother statue was dedicated in the Women's Memorial Quadrangle on the other side of Johnson Hall; the two statues are aligned so that they can "see" one another through the large windows of the hall's main floor.

Lawrence Hall is located at the end of a hardscape walkway directly north of the intersection of 13th Avenue and University Street. It houses the College of Design and was renamed after Ellis F. Lawrence, its first dean, in 1957. Allen Hall, opened in 1954, is adjacent to Lawrence Hall and houses the School of Journalism and Communication.

Additionally, the Erb Memorial Union and the recreation center are in this part of campus.

=== Lorry I. Lokey Science Complex and east campus ===
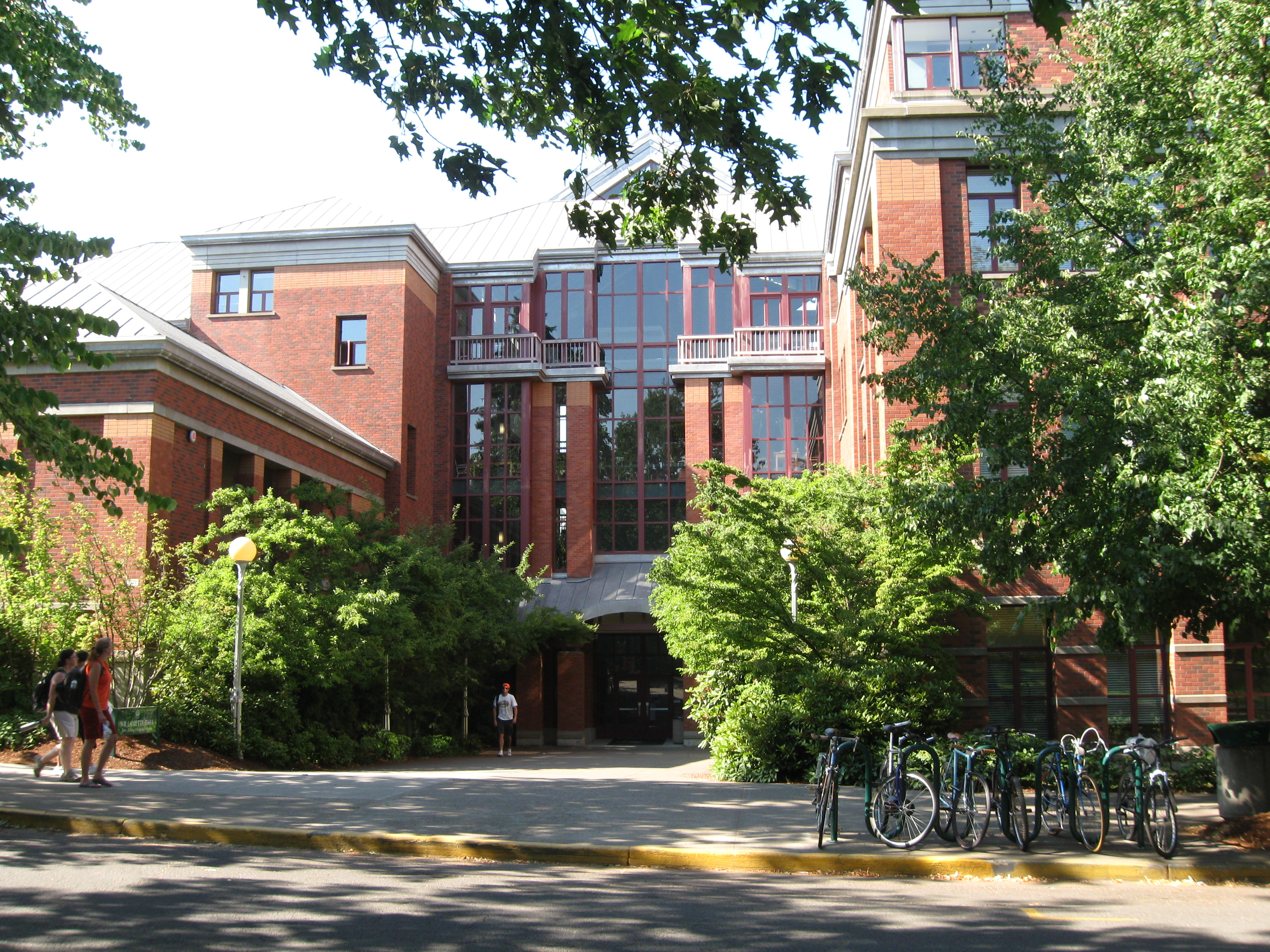
Willamette Hall, the centerpiece of the university's physics department

The Lorry I. Lokey Science Complex comprises multiple science buildings to the east of Lawrence Hall, on the north side of 13th Avenue. Willamette Hall's Paul Olum Atrium is the center of the university's hard sciences complex. The construction of Willamette Hall, home of the physics department; Cascade Hall, home of the geology department; Deschutes Hall, home of the Computer and Information Science Department; and Streisinger Hall to the complex were completed in 1989.

Within the Lokey Science Complex are two facilities focused on integrative science. One is the Lokey Laboratories, which is a shared-use facility with state-of-the-art characterization instrumentation. Lokey Laboratories is associated with the Oregon Nanoscience and Microtechnologies Institute (ONAMI) and was dedicated to Lorry I. Lokey in 2008, for his $25 million donation toward the project.

The Allan Price Science Commons and Research Library is also within the Lokey Science Complex. It underwent a major renovation and expansion with the new building reopening in 2016.

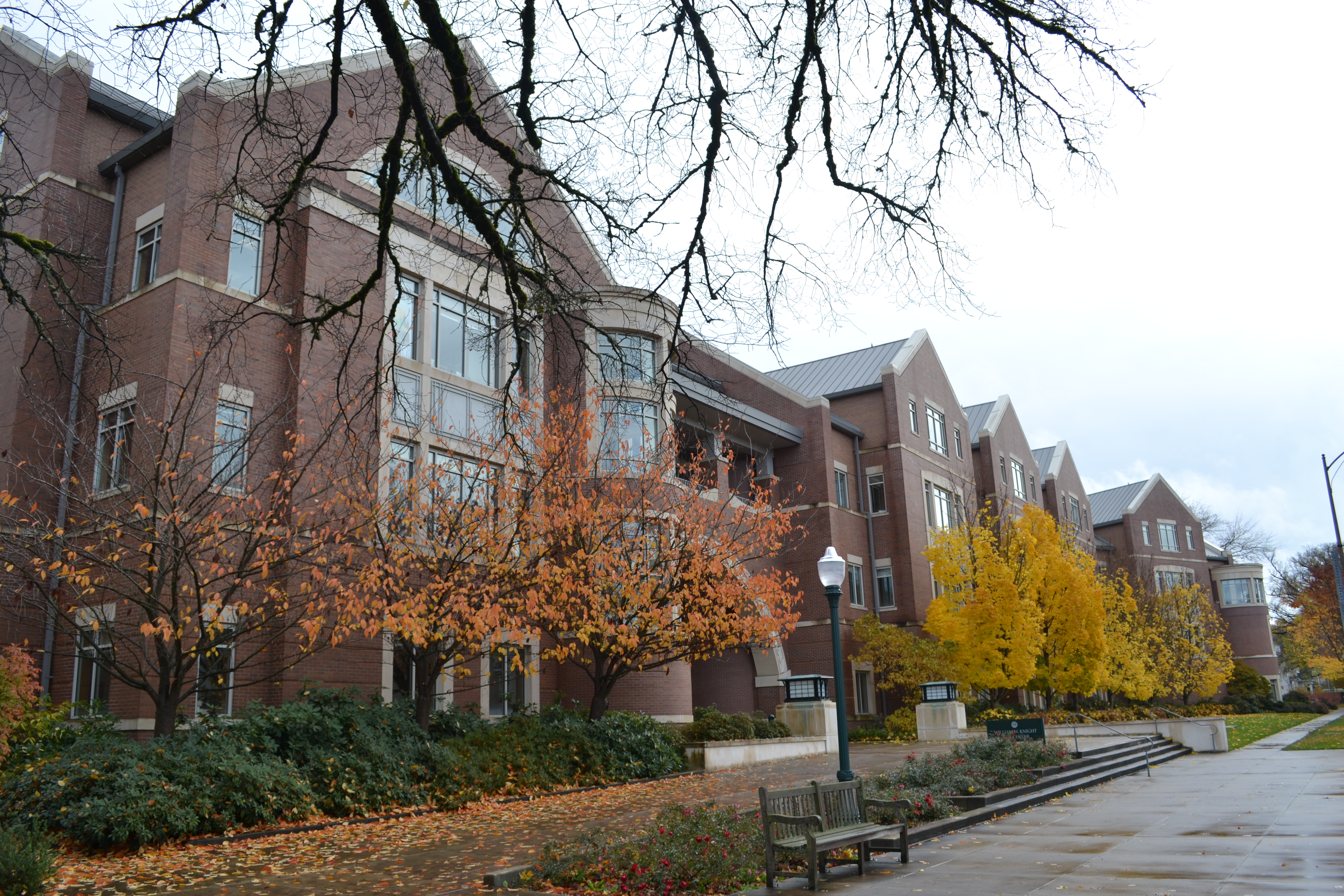
Knight Law Center

The northeast corner of campus is home to the Ford Alumni Center and Matthew Knight Arena. Most of the rest of the eastern part of campus is dedicated to residence halls. Carson Hall, near the Erb Memorial Union, provides dining services along with dormitories. Just south is the Living-Learning Center, opened in 2006. It is a collection of functions including dormitories, classrooms, study areas, dining rooms, and recreational rooms to provide a single location for many student activities. The newest residence hall, the Global Scholars Hall, opened in the fall of 2012. It primarily houses returning students and students enrolled in the Robert D. Clark Honors College, College Scholars, and the global scholars language programs.

=== South campus ===
The center of south campus is where much of the on-campus athletic facilities reside. Hayward Field, home to the Ducks track and field program, sits in the eastern area of the athletic facilities. It has hosted a number of prominent track and field events such as the US Track and Field Olympic Trials, the NCAA Track and Field Championships, and USATF Championships.

To the west of the athletic facilities lies Pioneer Cemetery and further west is where the current facilities for the College of Education exists, in the southwest corner of campus. The HEDCO Education building and the Frohnmayer Music Center are in the vicinity. The Knight Law Center is just opposite of Hayward Field in the southeast corner of campus. The Many Nations Longhouse and the Museum of Natural and Cultural History are East of Knight Law.

=== Knight campus ===
The Phil and Penny Knight Campus for Accelerating Scientific Impact is a billion dollar applied science campus. The campus is on the north side of Franklin Boulevard.

Phil and Penny Knight contributed two $500 million gifts to the campus. The rest of the funding is expected to come from state bonds and private support.

It is hoped that Knight Campus will help grow Oregon's biotechnology sector and generate economic growth for the state. However, professors at other institutions caution that nothing is guaranteed, and that creating a new economic hub from scratch is a tricky process.

=== Other areas and satellites ===
The controversial Riverfront Research Park is a small facility maintained by the university. It is used for creating new technologies, such as research about artificial intelligence at the Computational Intelligence Research Lab, and it is the home of the Zebrafish Information Network (ZFIN), the zebrafish model organism database. Controversy stems from the lack of citizen involvement in the planning process for the use of public lands, and the potential for multi-story office buildings and parking lots to replace open space, civic space, and wildlife habitat along the Willamette River. The university and student senates have each passed resolutions against construction on the banks of the Willamette River under the current development plan, yet plans for development persist. In March 2010, the issue of a conditional use permit extension for the Research Park was appealed to the Land Use Board of Appeals by a group of citizens, students, and faculty.

In 2022, UO purchased the campus of the now-closed Concordia University in Portland and converted it to the main campus of UO Portland. The university leases space in Old Town Portland in the White Stag Block as UO Portland Downtown, which was the main Portland campus until the Concordia campus purchase.

=== Sustainability ===
The undergraduate architecture program is consistently ranked among the highest in the country, and is currently ranked as the #1 public program for "Sustainable Design Practice and Principles" by DesignIntelligence magazine.

The University of Oregon received a grade of "B+" from the Sustainable Endowments Institute on its last published College Sustainability Report Card in 2011.

There has also been a push for sustainable buildings on campus with a development plan that requires any new building or renovation to incorporate sustainable design. The Lillis Business Complex was the catalyst for the policy. The building, completed in 2003 has earned a LEED Silver rating, the highest rating of any college business building in the United States. As of 2016, there were 15 different buildings on campus that have been awarded LEED Silver or above ratings.

== Organization and administration ==
Colleges and Schools

- College of Arts and Sciences
  - School of Global Studies and Languages
- Charles H. Lundquist College of Business
  - School of Accounting
- College of Design
  - School of Architecture & Environment
  - School of Art + Design
  - School of Planning, Public Policy and Management
- College of Education
- Robert D. Clark Honors College
- Division of Graduate Studies
- School of Journalism and Communication
- School of Law
- School of Music and Dance

The university is accredited by the Northwest Commission on Colleges and Universities, which is recognized by the United States Department of Education.

=== Governance ===
The university's internal governance is conducted in accordance with The Constitution of the University of Oregon. The UO Constitution provides a collaborative process that ensures a strong voice for the faculty, acting through the University Senate. The representation of students, civil servants, and administrative employees in the senate ensures this predominantly faculty body operates in the best interests of the entire university community.

UO Board of Trustees assumed control in 2014. The trustees have the broad authority to supervise and manage the university and may exercise all the powers, rights, duties and privileges expressly granted by law or that are implied by law or are incident to the board's powers, rights, duties and privileges.

Former provost Scott Coltrane served as interim president, from August 6, 2014, through June 30, 2015, following the resignation of Michael Gottfredson. This resignation occurred with less than 24 hours notice amidst a number of controversies, including allegations of mishandling of sexual violence, a decline of $100 million in university donations, and the alienation of faculty members around unionization and academic freedom. Including one interim president, Gottfredson was the university's fourth president in six years, a situation that led Chronicle of Higher Education to label the position a "revolving door".

Michael H. Schill was president from 2015 to 2022. John Karl Scholz entered office as the 19th president in 2023.

=== Budget ===
UO's FY14 operating revenue total $905 million. As of January 2013, the estimated economic impact of the University of Oregon is $2.6 billion annually. Despite a large increase in undergraduate enrollment, state appropriations are less than what they were 10 years prior. The university also receives less state support than many of its peers. According to FY13-14 data from the AAU, UO ranks last in state funding and receives approximately $47.8 million from the state.

=== Campus safety and security ===
Campus security is enforced by the University of Oregon Police Department.

The University of Oregon appeared in the documentary The Hunting Ground after allowing three basketball players accused of sexual assault to play in an NCAA Tournament. The documentary focuses on campus rape in higher education institutions in the United States.

In 2018 there were 8 rapes reported on campus. In 2018 there were 364 drug abuse violations and 894 liquor law violations on campus.

== Academics ==
Academic rankings

National
- Forbes: 133
- U.S. News & World Report: 109
- Washington Monthly: 158
- WSJ/College Pulse: 210

Global
- ARWU: 401–500
- QS: 751-760
- THE: 401–500
- U.S. News & World Report: 253

USNWR graduate school rankings
Business	88
Education	15
Law	94

USNWR graduate department rankings
Biological Sciences	68
Chemistry	58
Clinical Psychology	31
Computer Science	71
Earth Sciences	33
Economics	56
English	44
Fine Arts	53
History	50
Mathematics	62
Physics	67
Political Science	74
Psychology	47
Public Affairs	82
Sociology	42
Speech-Language Pathology	32

As of 2024, UO offered 420 degree programs. The UO student body is composed of students from all 50 of the United States, the District of Columbia, four U.S. territories, and 91 countries around the world. As of Fall 2025, Pre-Business Administration was the most popular undergraduate major at UO (11.1% of all majors), followed by Psychology (9.3%), Business Administration (8.5%), Human Physiology (5.6%), and Journalism: Advertising (3.9%).

The University of Oregon is organized into nine colleges and schools. UO's College of Arts and Sciences covers a large array of departments in the arts and sciences. The School of Global Studies and Languages is embedded within CAS. The Charles H. Lundquist College of Business was founded in 1884 and offers courses in fields such as accounting, decision sciences, entrepreneurship, finance, management, and marketing. The School of Accounting was established in 2017 to oversee the accounting program.

The College of Design was founded by Ellis F. Lawrence in 1914. The college offers undergraduate and graduate degrees in design and policy related fields. The college was known as the School of Allied Arts and Architecture and was renamed in 2017. The college is divided into three schools: School of Architecture & Environment, School of Art + Design, and the School of Planning, Public Policy and Management.

The College of Education was established in 1910 as the School of Education. The Robert D. Clark Honors College is a small honors college intended to complement the majors in place at the university by joining select students and faculty for a low student-to-teacher ratio (25:1 maximum). The School of Journalism and Communication is one of the oldest journalism schools in the United States; it began as a department in 1912 and became a professional school in 1916. The SOJC is located in Allen Hall on the University of Oregon's Eugene campus. The School of Law was formed in 1884 in Portland and moved to Eugene in early 1915. The School of Music and Dance was initially just the Department of Music in 1886, and developed into the School of Music in 1900.

The University of Oregon Medical School was founded in 1887 in Portland and merged with Willamette University's program in 1913. However, in 1974 it became an independent institution. It is now known as Oregon Health & Science University.

University of Oregon tuition
Tuition and fees
- Resident undergraduate: $16,755
- Non-resident undergraduate: $46,077

Estimated annual cost
- Resident undergraduate: $38,607
- Non-resident undergraduate: $68,931

=== Undergraduate admissions ===
The University of Oregon's undergraduate admissions process is "selective" according to U.S. News & World Report. For students entering Fall 2019, 22,329 freshmen were accepted out of 27,358 applicants, an 81.6% acceptance rate, and 4,525 enrolled for a yield of 20.3%.

Among freshman students who enrolled in fall 2019, SAT scores for the middle 50% ranged from 560 to 660 for evidence based reading and writing, and 540–650 for math. ACT composite scores for the middle 50% ranged from 22 to 28. The average high school GPA for incoming freshmen was 3.65. Of the 10% of entering freshmen who submitted high school class rank, 26% were in the top tenth of their graduating class, 57% in the top quarter, and 86% in the top half.

Fall freshman statistics
	2024	2023	2022	2021	2020	2019	2018	2017	2016	2015
Applicants	40,021	39,400	37,154	31,558	28,719	27,358	24,474	20,317	21,821	22,000
Admits	35,337	33,532	32,061	29,483	23,692	22,329	20,404	16,824	16,992	16,328
% Admitted	88.3	85.1	86.3	93.4	82.5	81.6%	83.4%	82.8%	77.9%	74.2%
Enrolled	5,087	5,032	5,313	4,589	3,920	4,525	4,168	3,938	4,041	4,133
Avg GPA	3.73	3.75	3.76	3.73	3.68	3.65	3.59	3.55	3.58	3.61
SAT range	1130-1360	1150-1340	1140-1370	1120-1330	1080-1270	1100–1310	1080–1290	1080–1270	980–1220	1000–1230

=== Faculty ===
As of May 2022, at least 19 UO faculty (living or deceased) have been elected to the National Academy of Sciences.

As of the fall of 2023, the university has 2,097 faculty members. Among this group there are 782 tenure and tenure-track (ladder) faculty members. Among US doctoral universities UO is ranked 80th when it come to full professor salaries. However, when other compensation measures are factored in, UO ranks 58th.

Average Salary 2024-25 AY
$150,100 (Professor)
$110,500 (Associate)
$100,000 (Assistant)

=== Research ===
The university is a member of the Association of American Universities. It is also classified as a "Very High Research Activity" university, according to the Carnegie Classification of Institutions of Higher Education. UO has comparatively small research spending totals for an AAU level university. According to the National Science Foundation, Oregon spent $111 million on research and development in 2018, ranking it 151st in the nation.

The university has 13 research centers and institutes. The university also maintains nine "research core facilities".

=== Libraries ===
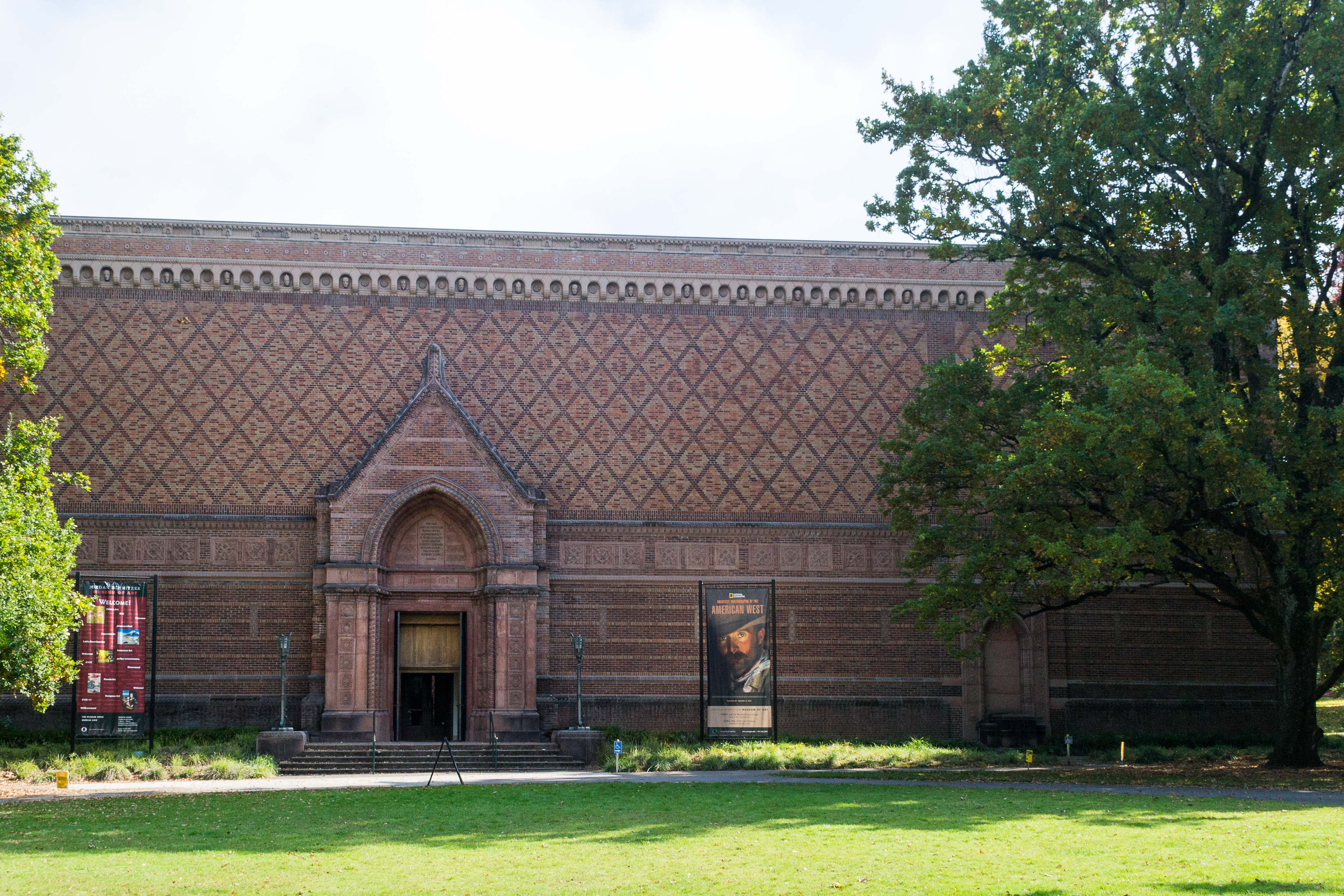
Jordan Schnitzer Museum of Art

The multi-branch University of Oregon Libraries serves the campus with library collections, instruction and reference, and a wide variety of educational technology and media services. The UO is Oregon's only member of the Association of Research Libraries. The main branch, the Knight Library, houses humanities and social sciences, Learning Commons, Music Services, Government Publications, Maps and Aerial Photos, Special Collections & University Archives, Media Services, the Center for Educational Technologies, and a Cinema Studies lab to be available in Winter 2010. Other branch locations are:

- The Design Library in Lawrence Hall
- The John E. Jaqua Law Library in the Knight Law Center
- The Loyd & Dorothy Rippey Library at the Oregon Institute of Marine Biology in Charleston, Oregon.
- The Mathematics Library in Fenton Hall
- The Portland Library & Learning Commons in the White Stag Block in Portland, Oregon
- The Science Library in the Price Science Commons

The UO Libraries hosts Scholars' Bank, an open access (OA) digital repository created to capture, distribute and preserve the intellectual output of the University of Oregon. Scholars' Bank uses open-source DSpace software developed by Massachusetts Institute of Technology and Hewlett-Packard.

The Special Collections & University Archives house a collection of Gardner Fox's literary manuscripts, comic books, and other materials, including over 200 letters from fans. It is also the home to a rare collection of thousands of Japanese senjafuda (votive slips), part of the Gertrude Bass Warner Collection.

== Student life ==
Undergraduate demographics as of Fall 2023
Race and ethnicity	Total
White	62%
Hispanic	16%
Two or more races	10%
Asian	7%
Black	3%
Unknown	1%
Foreign national	1%
American Indian/Alaska Native	1%
Economic diversity
Low-income (Note: The percentage of students who received an income-based federal Pell grant intended for low-income students.)	23%
Affluent (Note: The percentage of students who are a part of the American middle class at the bare minimum.)	77%

=== Special events ===
UO is home to various special events. One of the most popular and well-known events held on campus is the Oregon Bach Festival. The festival is a donor-sponsored program of the university and the only major music festival affiliated with an American university. Founded in 1970 by German conductor Helmuth Rilling and UO professor (and past president of the American Choral Directors Association) Royce Saltzman, the festival has grown into an international program that draws hundreds of musicians and over 40,000 attendees annually.

The festival has presented such artists as Frederica von Stade, Bobby McFerrin, Garrison Keillor, and Thomas Quasthoff, who made his American debut in Eugene in 1995. The festival actively commissions and premieres new choral-orchestra works, including pieces by Arvo Pärt, Osvaldo Golijov, and Tan Dun. A Bach Festival recording of the world-premiere performance of Krzyztof Penderecki's Credo won the 2001 Grammy Award for best choral performance.

=== Clubs and groups ===
There are more than 250 student groups at the University of Oregon, most of which are headquartered in the Erb Memorial Union.

The University of Oregon is home to three student-run a cappella groups: Divisi, a treble ensemble; On the Rocks, a TTBB ensemble; and Mind the Gap, a mixed ensemble.

==== Media ====
The University of Oregon has a diverse array of student-run and student-created media, including the Daily Emerald, the Oregon Commentator, and Ethos Magazine, among others.

The university is also home of two radio stations: KWAX (classical music) and KWVA (campus radio).

=== Government ===
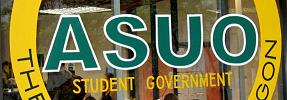
ASUO office

There are two major governing bodies at the University of Oregon. The largest is the Associated Students of the University of Oregon. Its purpose is to provide for the social, cultural, educational and physical development of its members, and for the advancement of their individual and collective interests both within and without the university.

Student participation in governance of the university extends to membership in the University Senate, which has five student members with full voting rights plus the ASUO president as a nonvoting member. Students are also represented on the university's board of trustees by a voting member appointed by the Governor of Oregon.

The total FY2014-15 ASUO budget was $15.24 million.

The second-largest governing body is the Residence Hall Association (RHA), who advocate for all students living on-campus. Its purpose is to relay ideas and feedback as a way of communication with University Housing. RHA advocates for residence hall students; stimulates an environment of growth, learning, and development for all students in the residence halls through programming; submits recommendations and ideas regarding policy to University Housing.

==== Graduate Teaching Fellows Federation ====
The University of Oregon Graduate Teaching Fellows Federation (GTFF) was established in 1976 to represent graduate student workers and it is one of the oldest graduate student unions in the U.S. The UO administration objected to the establishment of the union, citing that graduate workers were "students, not employees". The Oregon Employment Relations Board (ERB) ruled in favor of the graduate students and supported their right to organize. The GTFF began organizing its first contract in April 1977 and reached a negotiation with the university administration after two strike votes. In 1993, the GTFF successfully bargained for employer-paid health insurance.

In 2014, the GTFF went on strike for the first time. In October, GTFF members voted to authorize a strike over two issues not yet included in the GTF contract: a pay raise to the minimum GTF salary and a form of paid sick leave. The strike lasted a week and overlapped with the university's administration of final examinations. Although the union members accused the university administration of strike breaking activities, intimidation of international students, and unlawful demands, a compromise was reached and the strike ended.

=== Facilities and housing ===
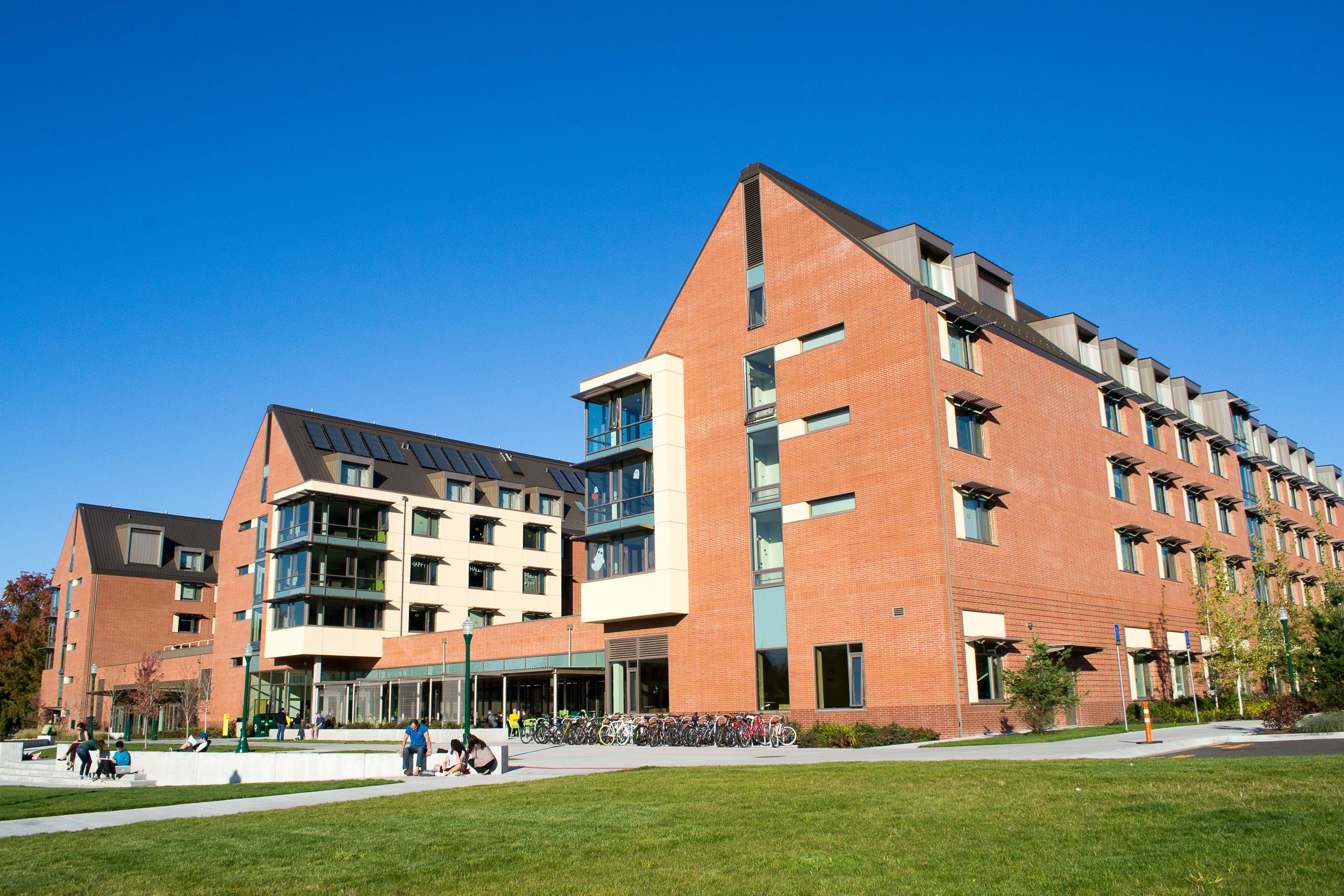
The Global Scholars Hall housing complex at the University of Oregon, opened in 2012

The Erb Memorial Union (EMU) is the student union, which functions as a center for student life. It sits on the southeast corner of 13th and University St. The EMU underwent a major renovation and expansion project from 2013 to 2016. The wing, built in 1973 was demolished in 2014 to make way for a new wing. Opened in the fall of 2016, the new facility includes improved dining options, faculty and group offices, and meeting spaces.

South of the Erb Memorial Union across a small quad is the Student Recreational Center (SRC). The Lyllye Reynolds-Parker Black Cultural Center, named in honor of Lyllye-Reynolds Parker, opened in 2019.

There are several other residence halls. Kalapuya Ilihi opened next to Global Scholars Hall, and hosts 531 students, as well as includes an open-space for students and faculty on the ground floor. Unthank Hall completed construction in 2019 and opened to student use in 2021.

== Athletics ==
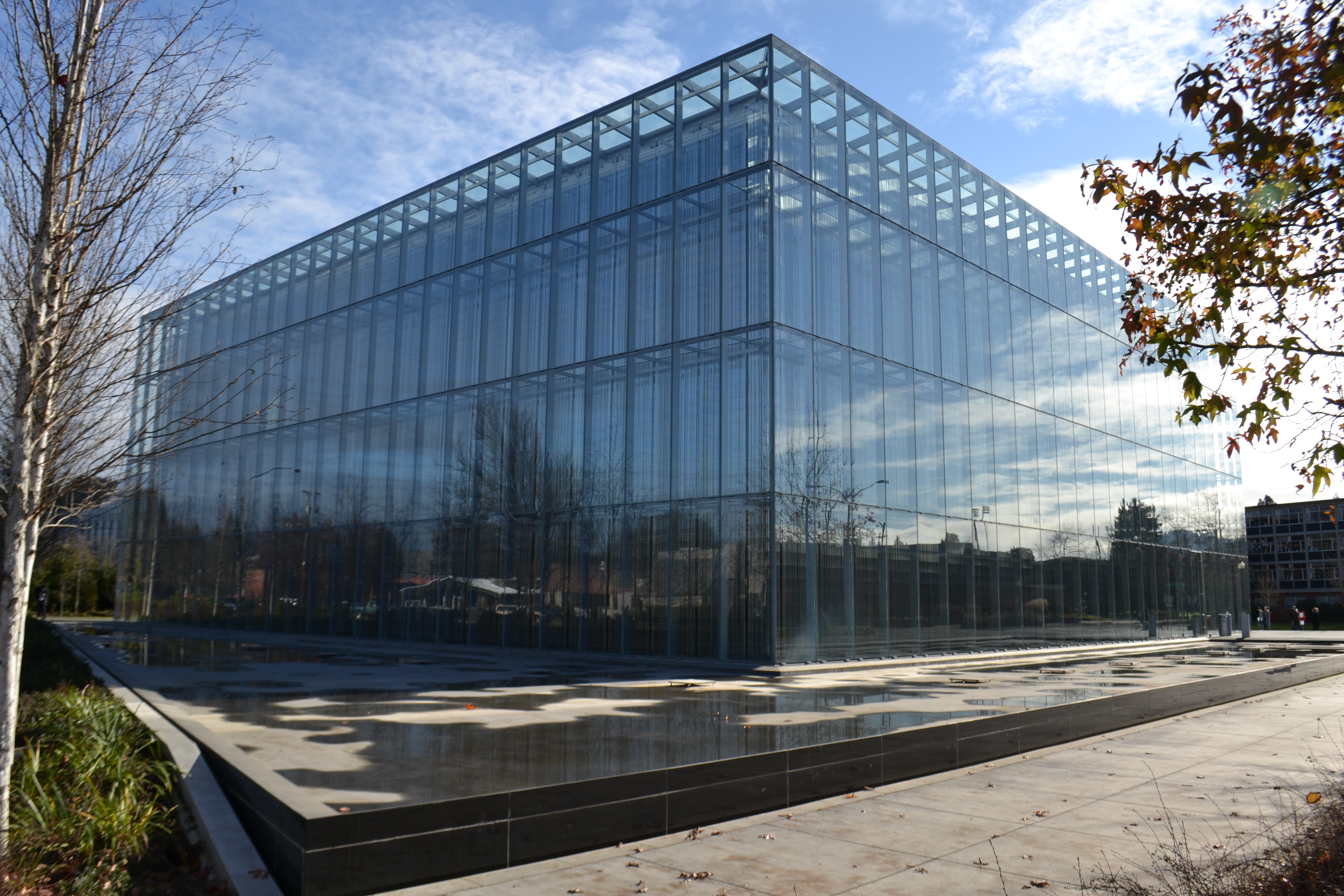
John E. Jaqua Center for Student Athletes

The University of Oregon is a member of the Big Ten Conference and the Division I Football Bowl Subdivision of the NCAA. The athletic programs have garnered 28 NCAA team championships, as well as 60 NCAA individual champions in various track and field events. The strength of the track program, as well as its connection to Nike, has made Eugene known as "Track Town, USA". The two primary rivals of the Oregon Ducks football team are the Washington Huskies and the Oregon State Beavers, though they also have a strong rivalry with the Washington State Cougars. The football rivalry with Oregon State University is one of the nation's oldest. Every year, the two teams face off in the last game of the regular season. The two teams have faced each other nearly every year since 1894 except for five years. Games were not held in 1900, 1901, 1911, 1943, and 1944.

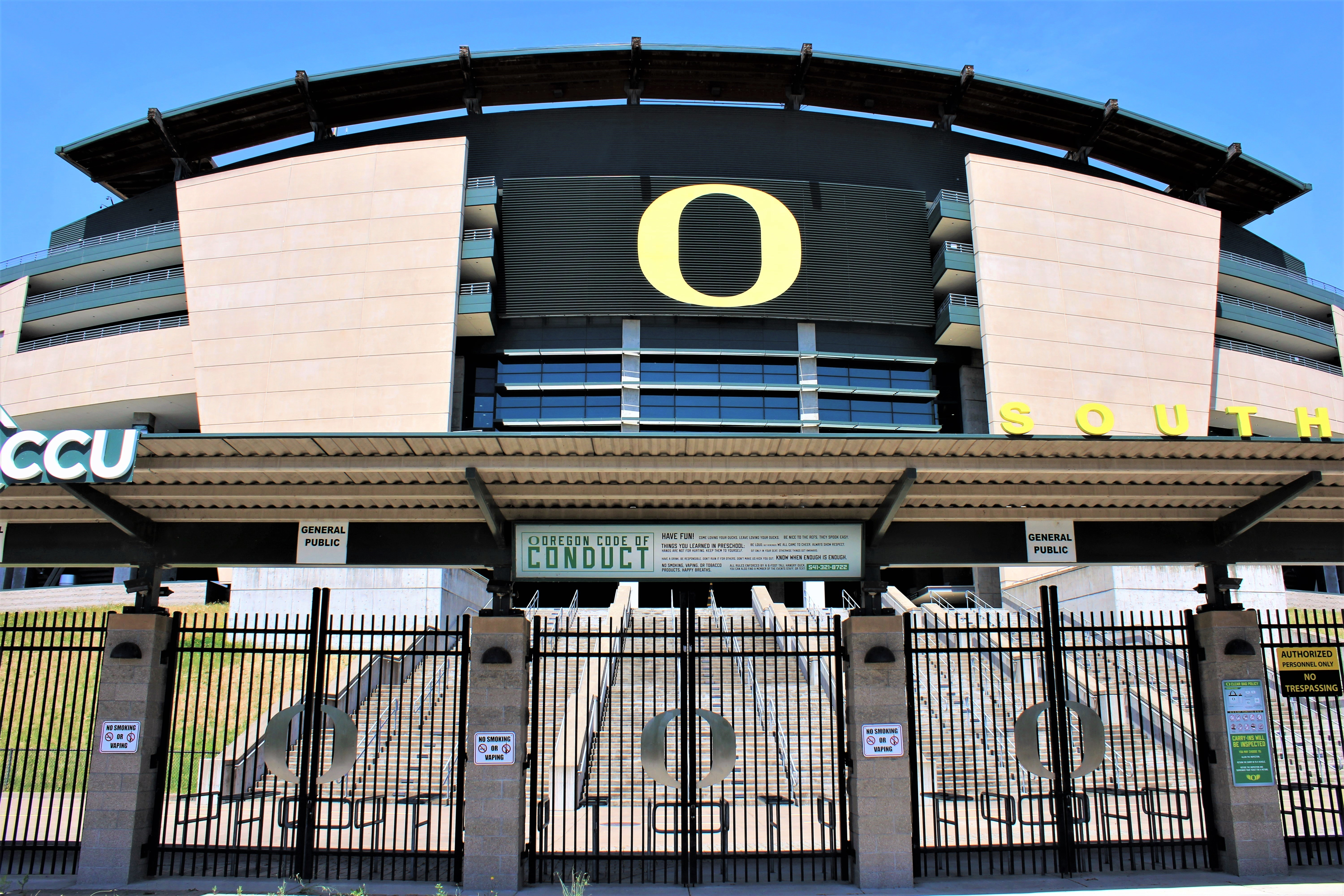
Exterior of Autzen Stadium

The university competes in 14 sports: football, men's and women's basketball, cross country, track and field, baseball, softball, men's and women's tennis, men's and women's golf, women's soccer, women's lacrosse, women's volleyball, and acrobatics & tumbling. This does not include club sports which competes at the Division I level in Rugby, Soccer, Rowing, and Waterpolo. As well as women's Division I club athletics in Rowing, Rugby, and Waterpolo.

With 20 NCAA championships between them, cross country and track and field are the two programs at the university that have enjoyed the most success. The programs have produced many world-class athletes including Steve Prefontaine and Alberto Salazar, the latter of whom was also a coach until he was banned for life. Nike had been formed by the former track and field head coach Bill Bowerman and former University of Oregon track runner Phil Knight. The successes of the programs have given the name of Track Town, USA to Eugene.

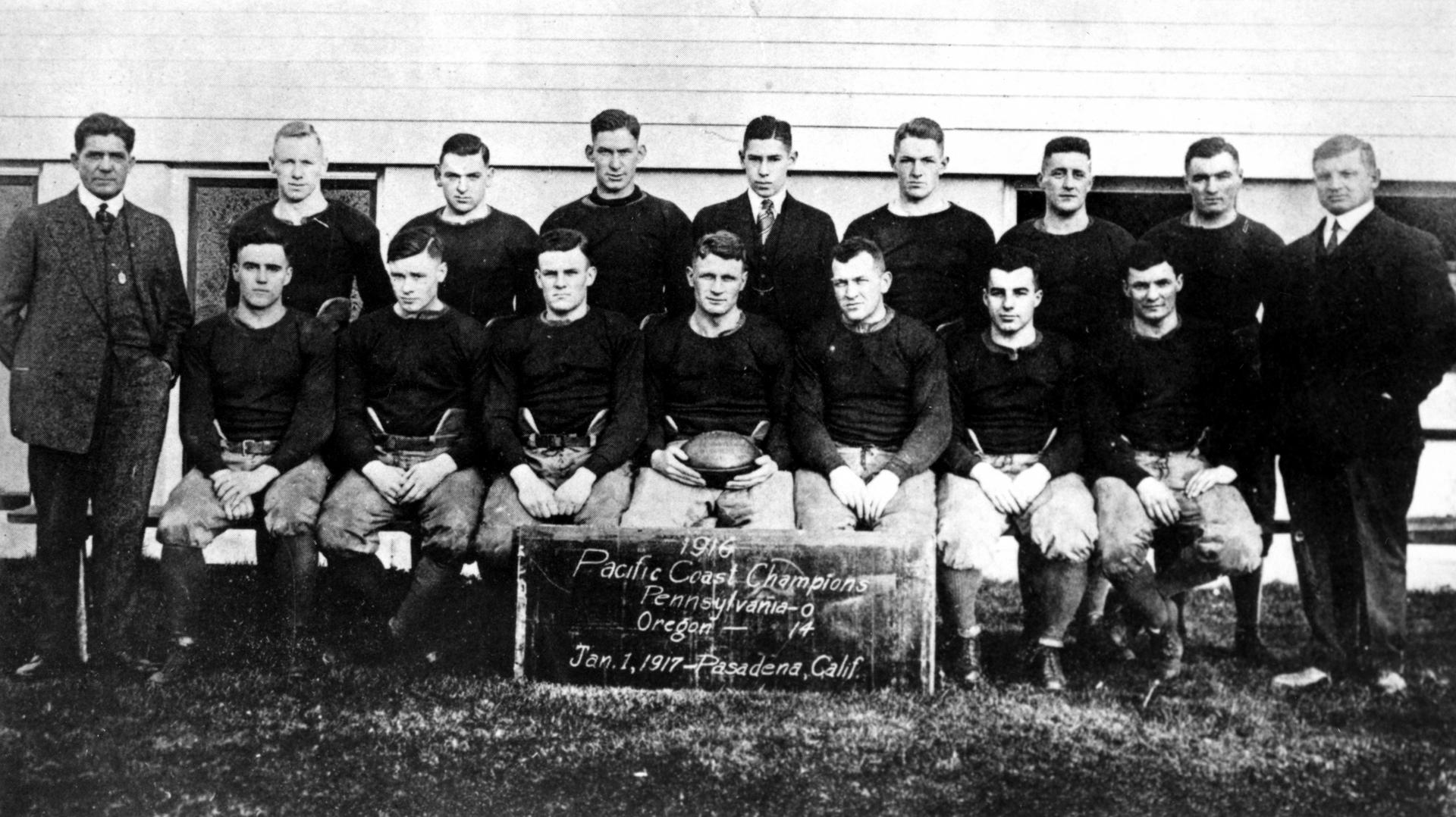
University of Oregon 1917 football team

Created in 1893, the football team played its first game in 1894 and won its first Rose Bowl in 1917 against the University of Pennsylvania. The 1938–39 men's basketball team, nicknamed the "Tall Firs", won the first-ever NCAA basketball tournament by defeating Ohio State in the March 28, 1939, championship game.

Originally recognized as an official sport at the university in 1908, baseball was disbanded in 1981 due to concerns with Title IX. In 2007, the athletic director Patrick Kilkenny announced plans to reinstate baseball and to drop wrestling while adding women's acrobatics & tumbling.

=== Relationship with Nike ===
The Athletic Department (AD) and university (UO) have a long and complex relationship with Nike Inc., as the corporation was founded by two UO alumni. Nike founder Phil Knight is also one of the largest benefactors in the history of UO. In recent years he has invested heavily in developing and maintaining the athletic apparatus. The University emphasized that this would not mean an end to the annual Oregon–Oregon State football rivalry game.

=== Mascot ===
The mascot of the University of Oregon is the fighting duck. The popular Disney character Donald Duck has been the mascot for decades, thanks to an agreement between then-Athletic Director Leo Harris and Walt Disney in 1947. The mascot was challenged in 1966, when Disney died and the company realized there was no formal contract written for the use of Donald's image. A contract was written up in 1973. Potential heirs "Mallard Drake" and "Mandrake" challenged Donald's position in 1978 and 2003 respectively, but both were unpopular and discontinued.

=== Song ===
The fight song is "Mighty Oregon", written by professor Albert Perfect and student John DeWitt Gilbert in 1916. It has undergone several changes since its original performance.

== In fiction and popular culture ==
=== Onscreen ===
The film National Lampoon's Animal House (1978) was filmed on the university campus and the surrounding area. The building used as the exterior of the Delta House (which belonged to the University of Oregon Pi Kappa Alpha chapter) was demolished in 1986, but the interior scenes were shot in the Sigma Nu house, which still stands. The Omega house belongs to the Phi Kappa Psi fraternity and still stands. The sorority house where Bluto climbs the ladder to peek in on the female students was actually the exterior of the Sigma Nu fraternity. Other buildings used during filming include Johnson Hall, Gerlinger Hall, Fenton Hall, Carson Hall, and the Erb Memorial Union (EMU). The EMU dining facility known as "The Fishbowl" was the site of the famous food-fight scene. The Knight Library and the Jordan Schnitzer Museum of Art can also be seen in the movie.

Other films shot at the university include

- Ed's Co-Ed (1929)
- Abe Lincoln in Illinois (1940)
- Five Easy Pieces (1970)
- Drive, He Said (1970)
- How to Beat the High Cost of Living (1980)
- Personal Best (1982)
- Stand By Me (1986) (shot primarily in nearby Brownsville)
- Without Limits (1998)
- Zerophilia (2005)

== People ==
=== Alumni ===
Notable alumni of the University of Oregon include:

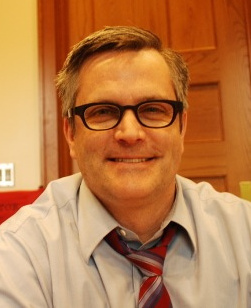
Sam Adams, first openly gay Mayor of Portland

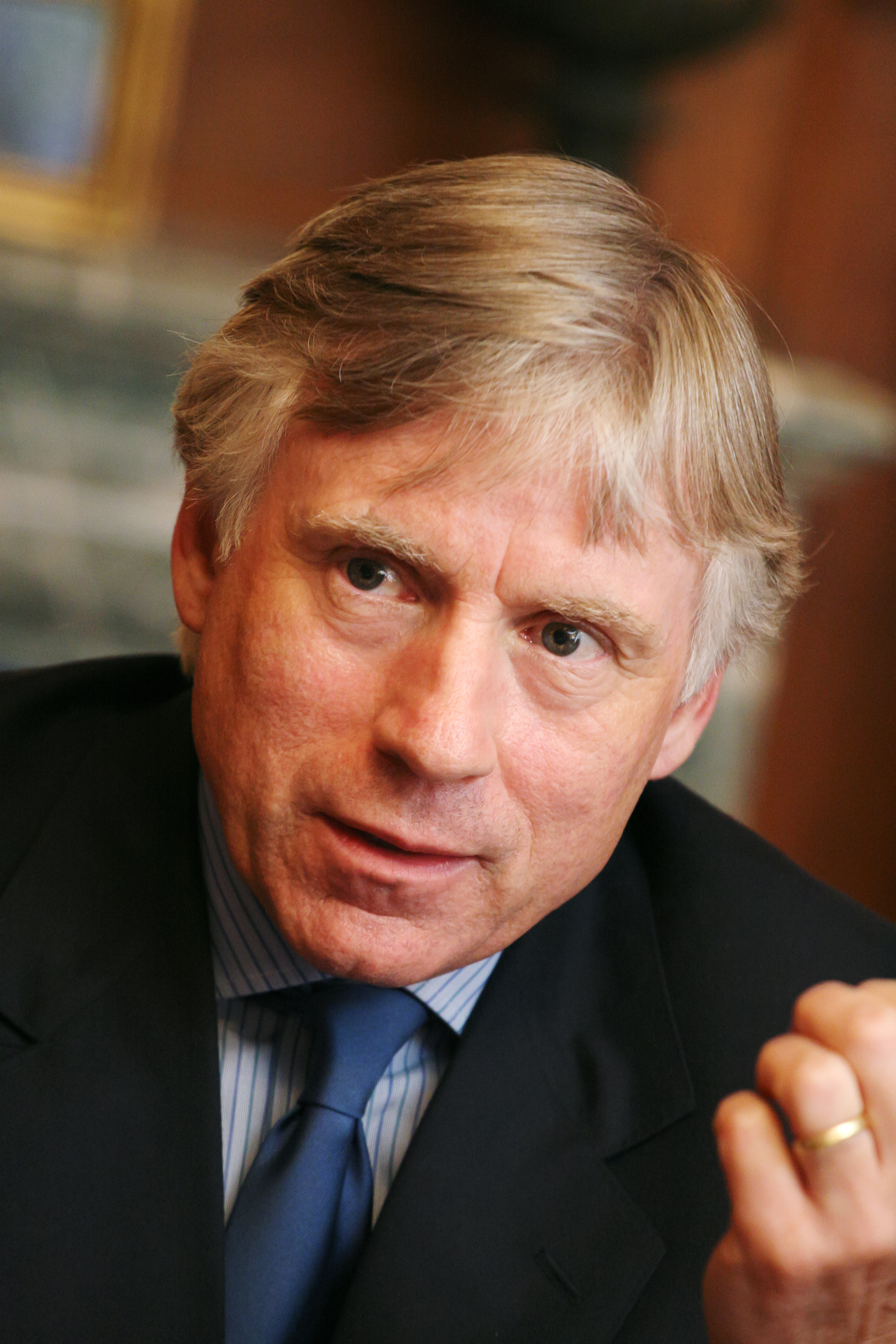
Lee Bollinger, President of Columbia University and former President of the University of Michigan

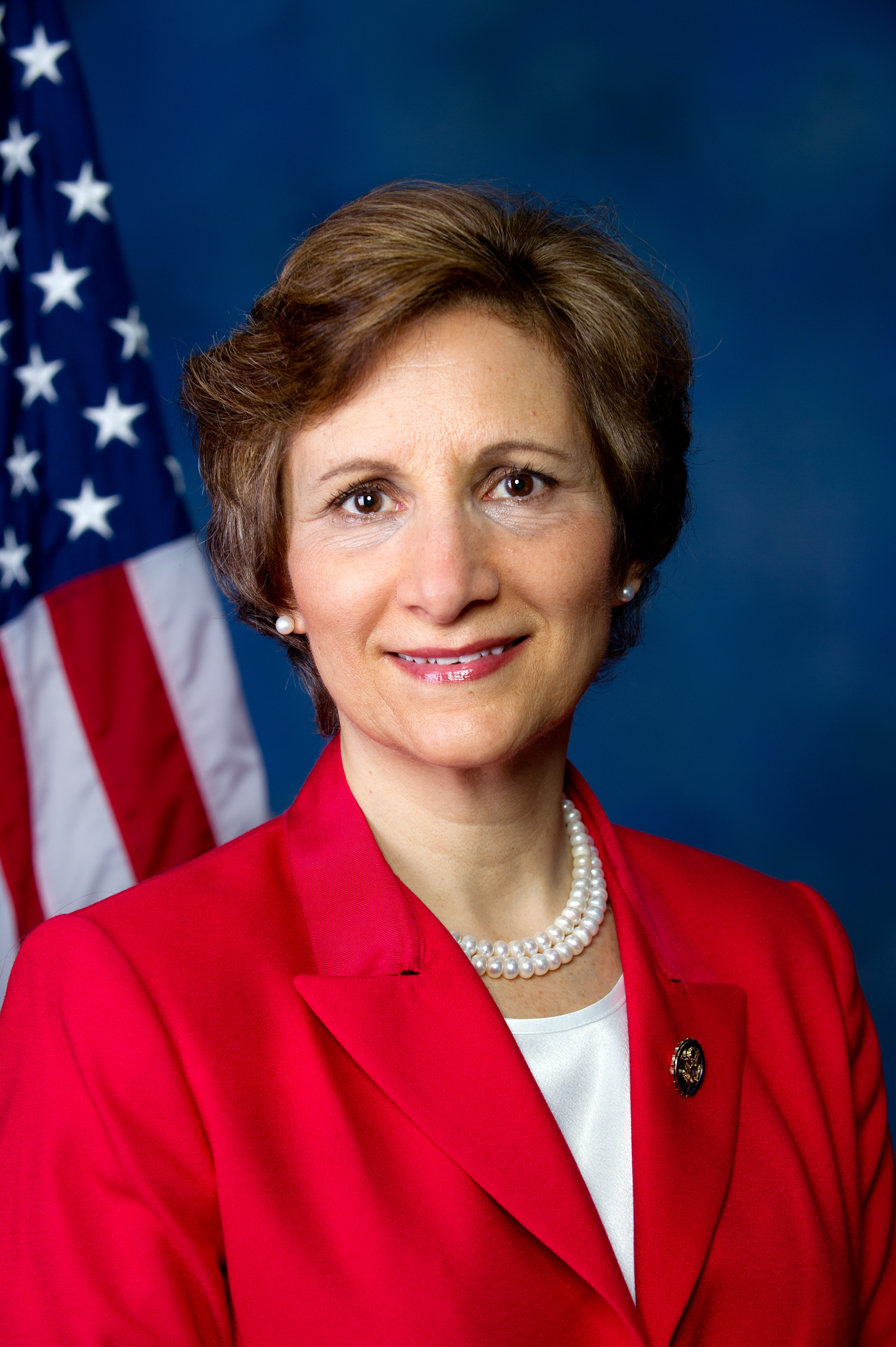
Suzanne Bonamici, U.S. Representative from Oregon's 1st district

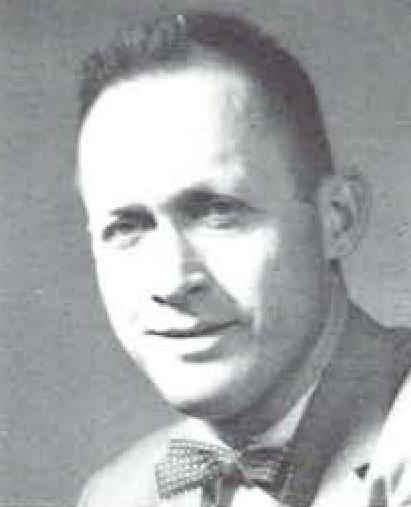
Bill Bowerman, Track and Field coach and co-founder of Nike, Inc.

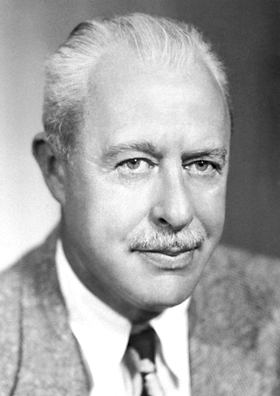
Walter Houser Brattain, co-winner of 1956 Nobel Prize in Physics

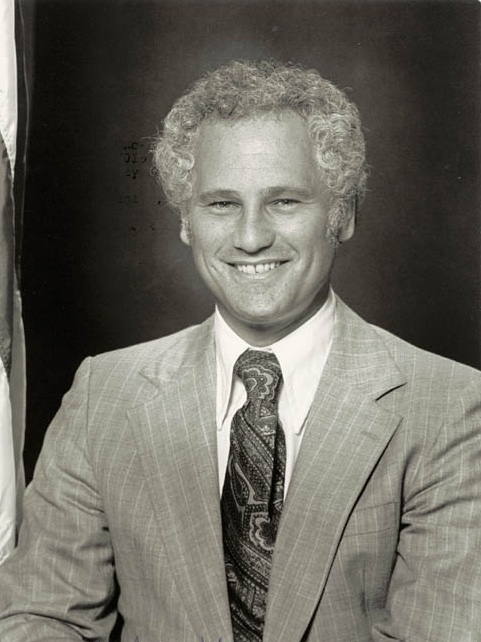
Neil Goldschmidt, 33rd Governor of Oregon and 6th United States Secretary of Transportation

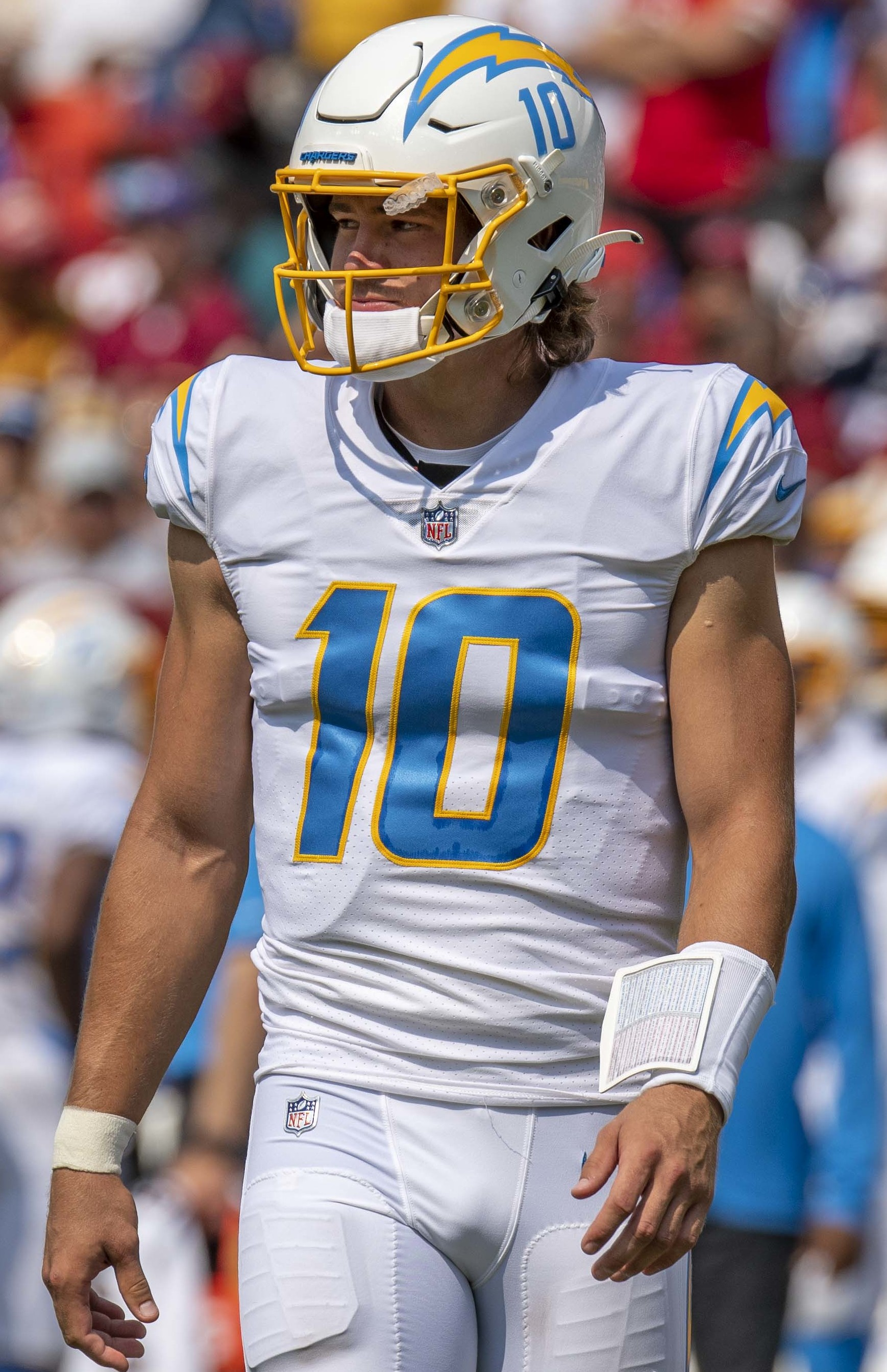
Justin Herbert, current NFL Quarterback of the Los Angeles Chargers

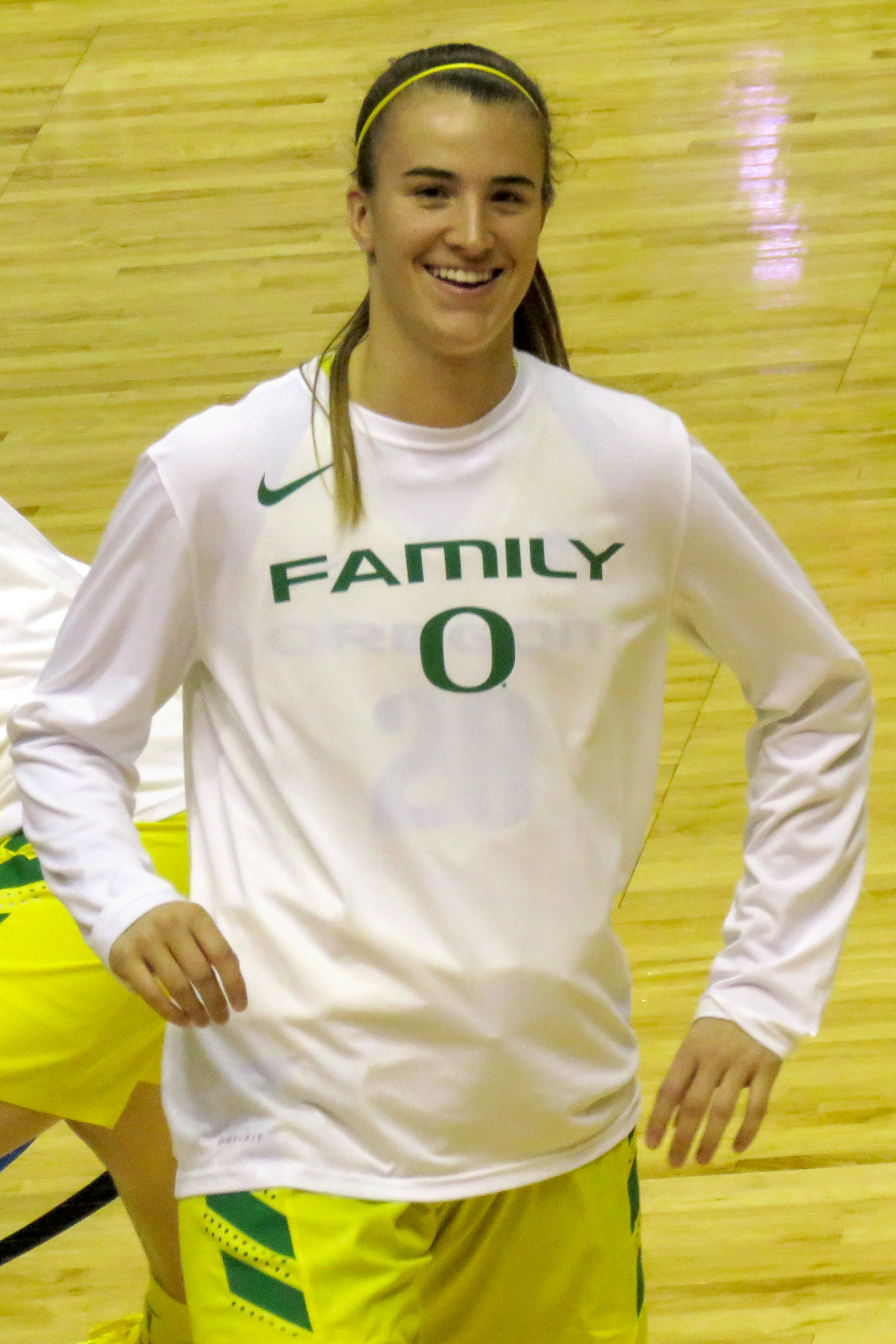
Sabrina Ionescu, NCAA all-time leader in triple-doubles

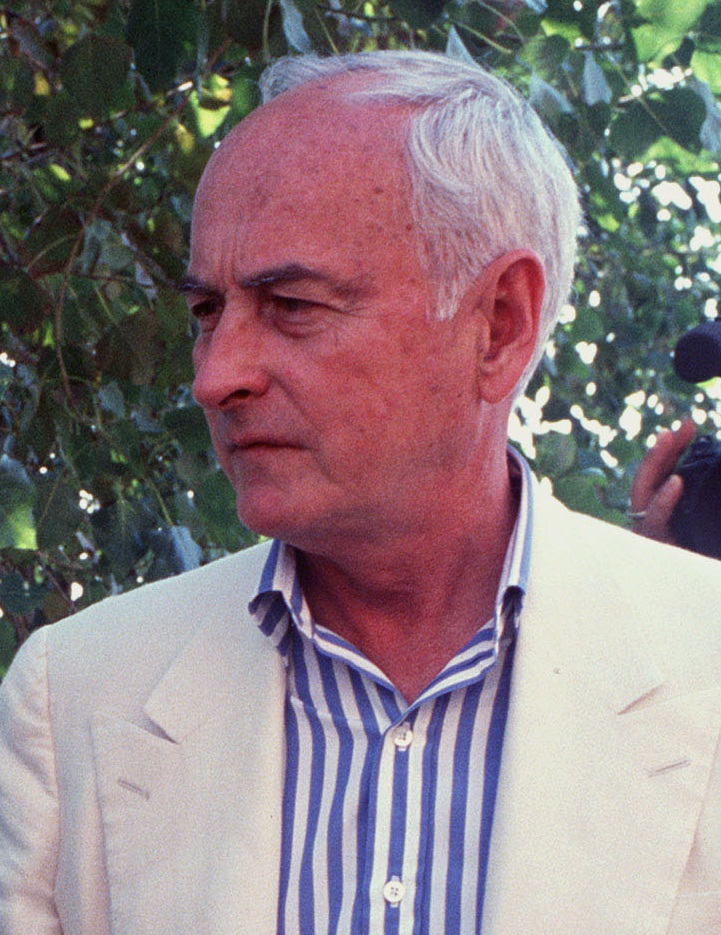
James Ivory, Oldest Oscar winner at age 89. Directorial credits include A Room with a View and The Remains of the Day

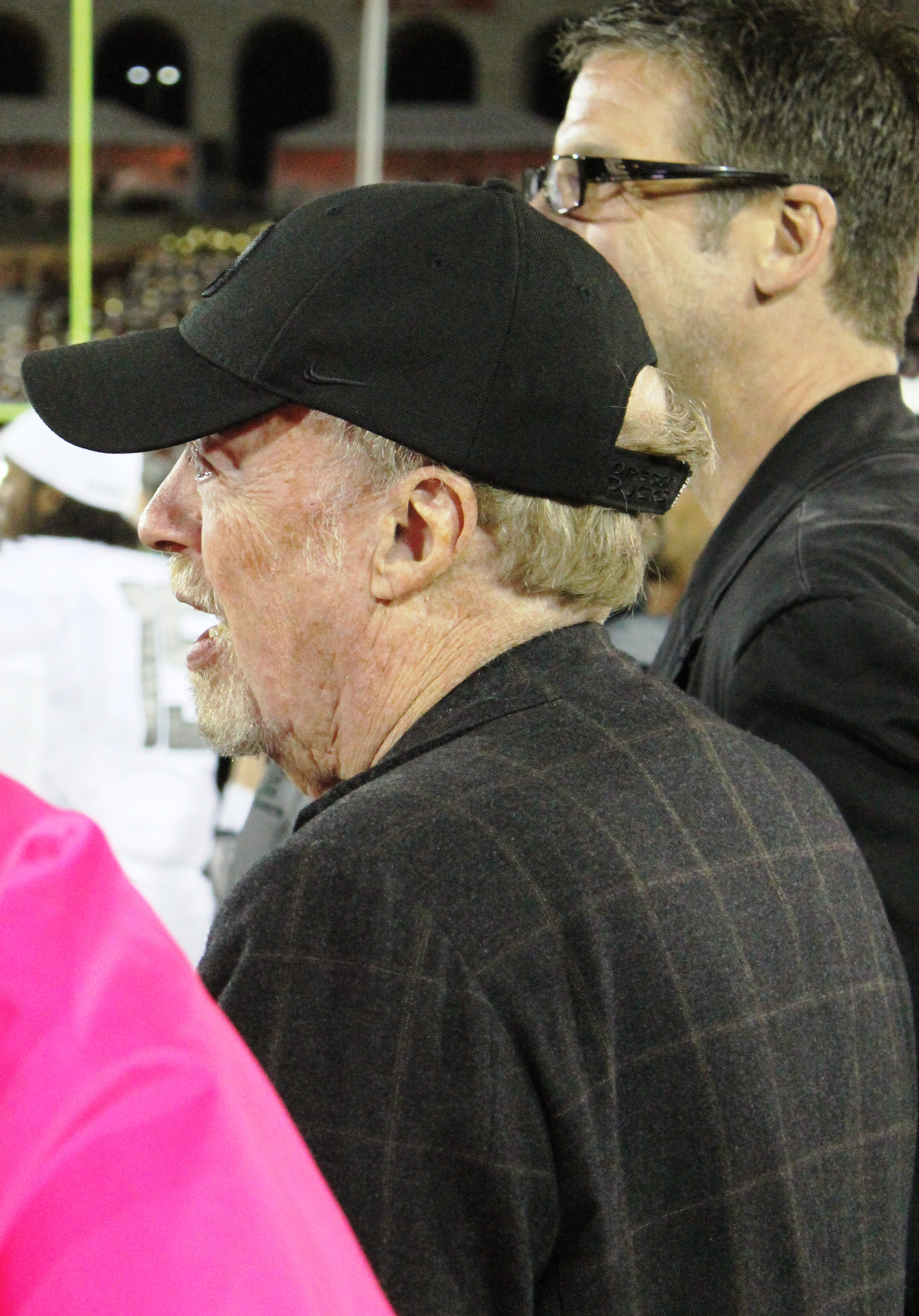
Phil Knight, co-founder of Nike, Inc.

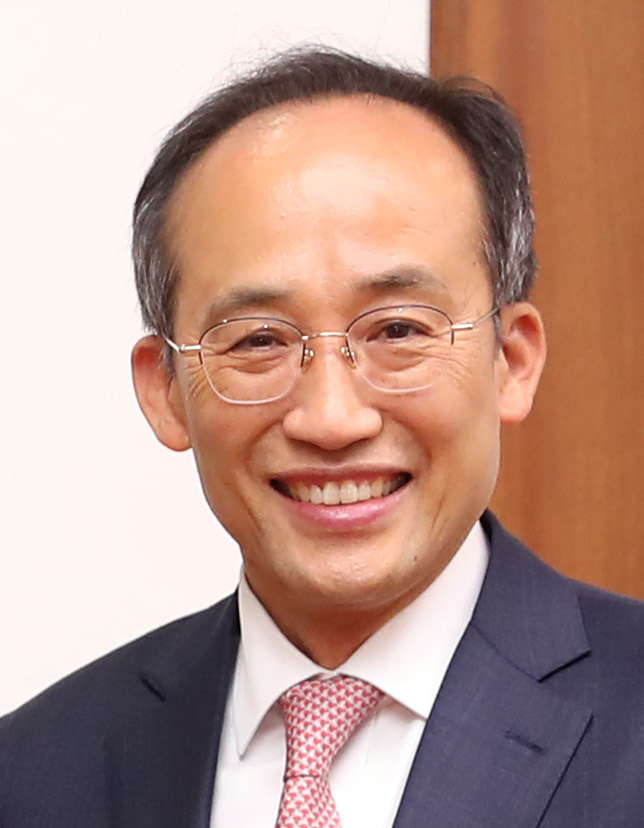
Choo Kyung-ho, South Korean Deputy Prime Minister and Minister of Economy and Finance

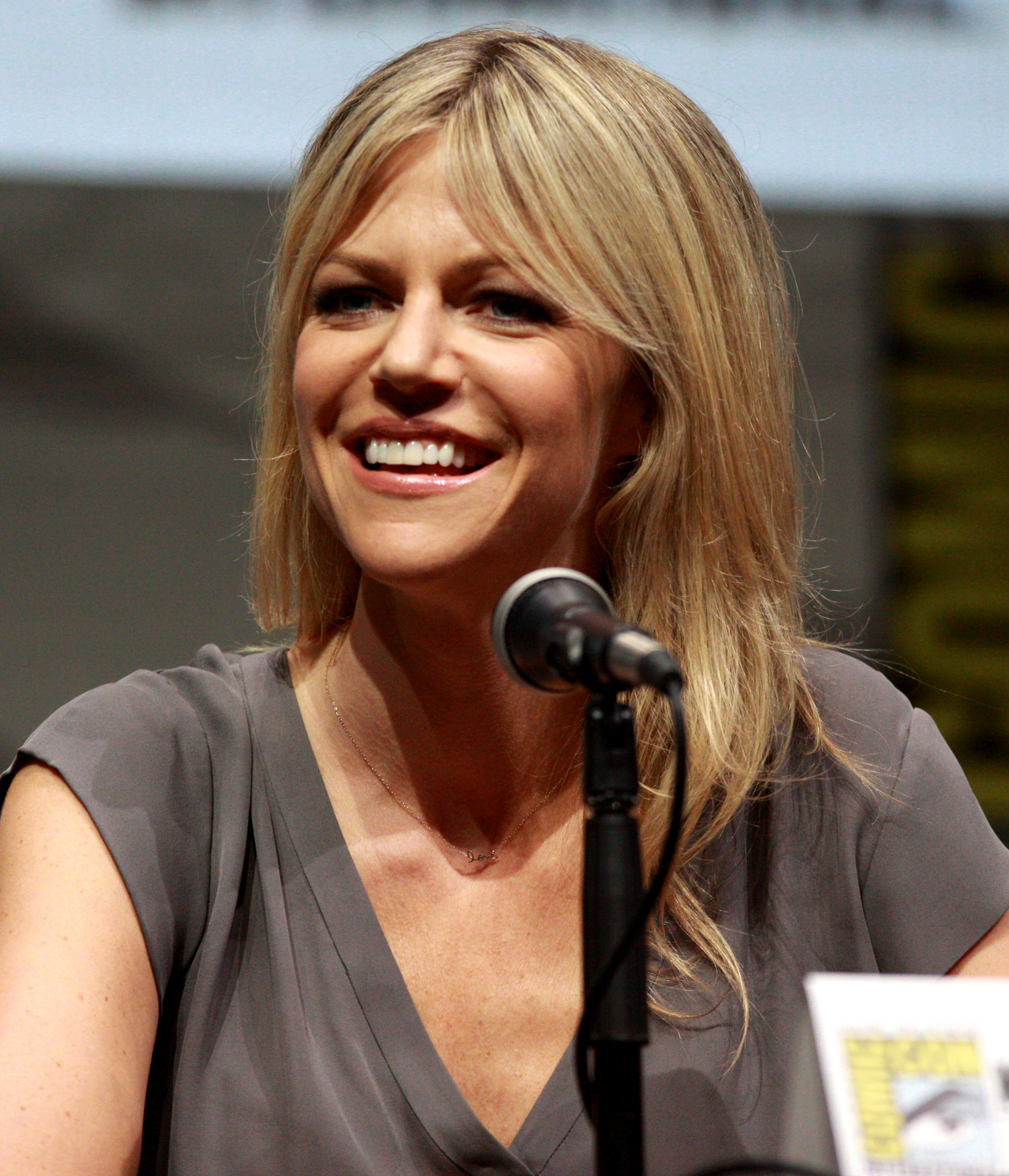
Kaitlin Olson, actress

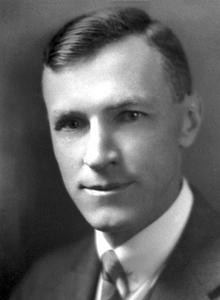
William P. Murphy, co-winner of 1934 Nobel Prize in Physiology or Medicine

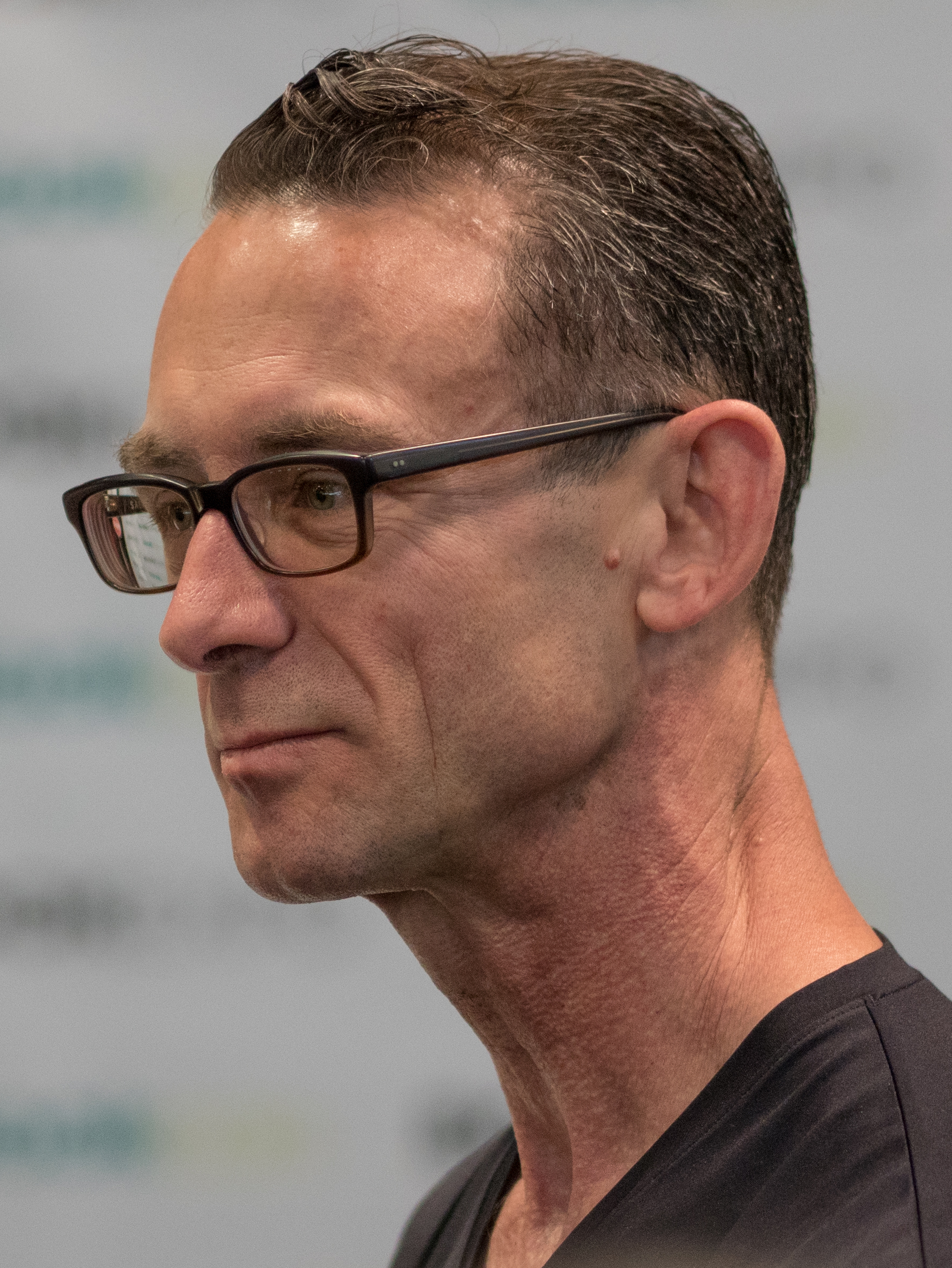
Chuck Palahniuk, journalist and author of Fight Club

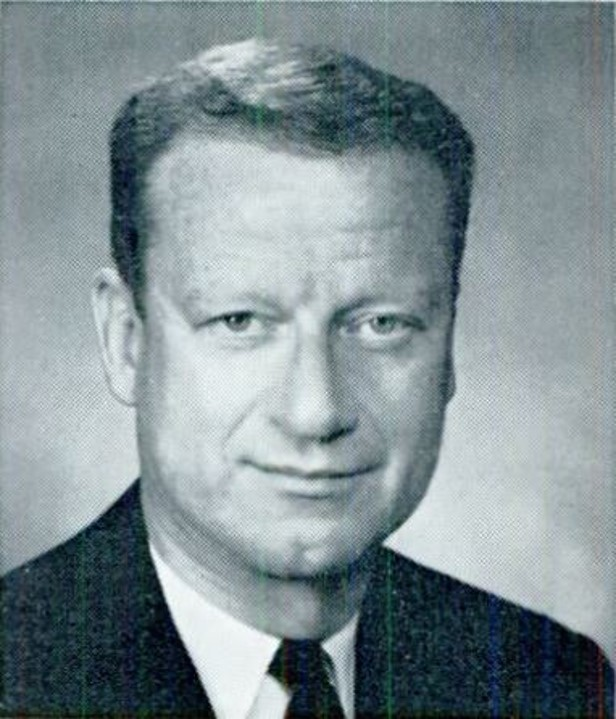
William V. Roth, former U.S. senator from Delaware

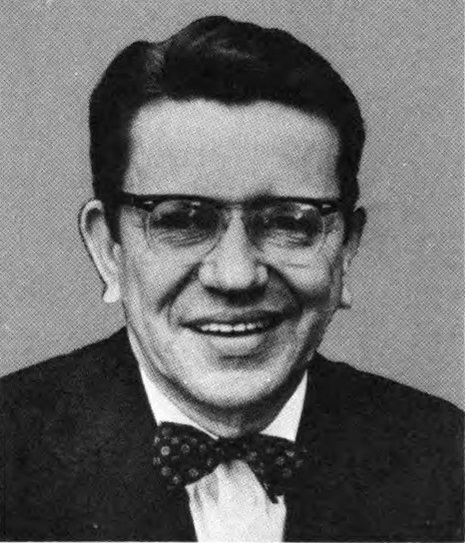
Paul Simon, former U.S. senator from Illinois

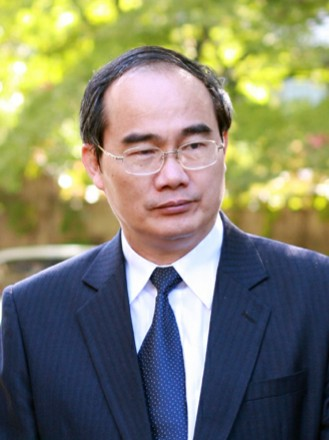
Nguyen Thien Nhan, former Deputy Prime Minister of Vietnam

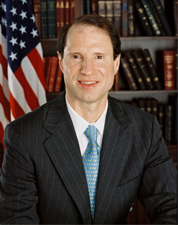
Ron Wyden, U.S. senator from Oregon

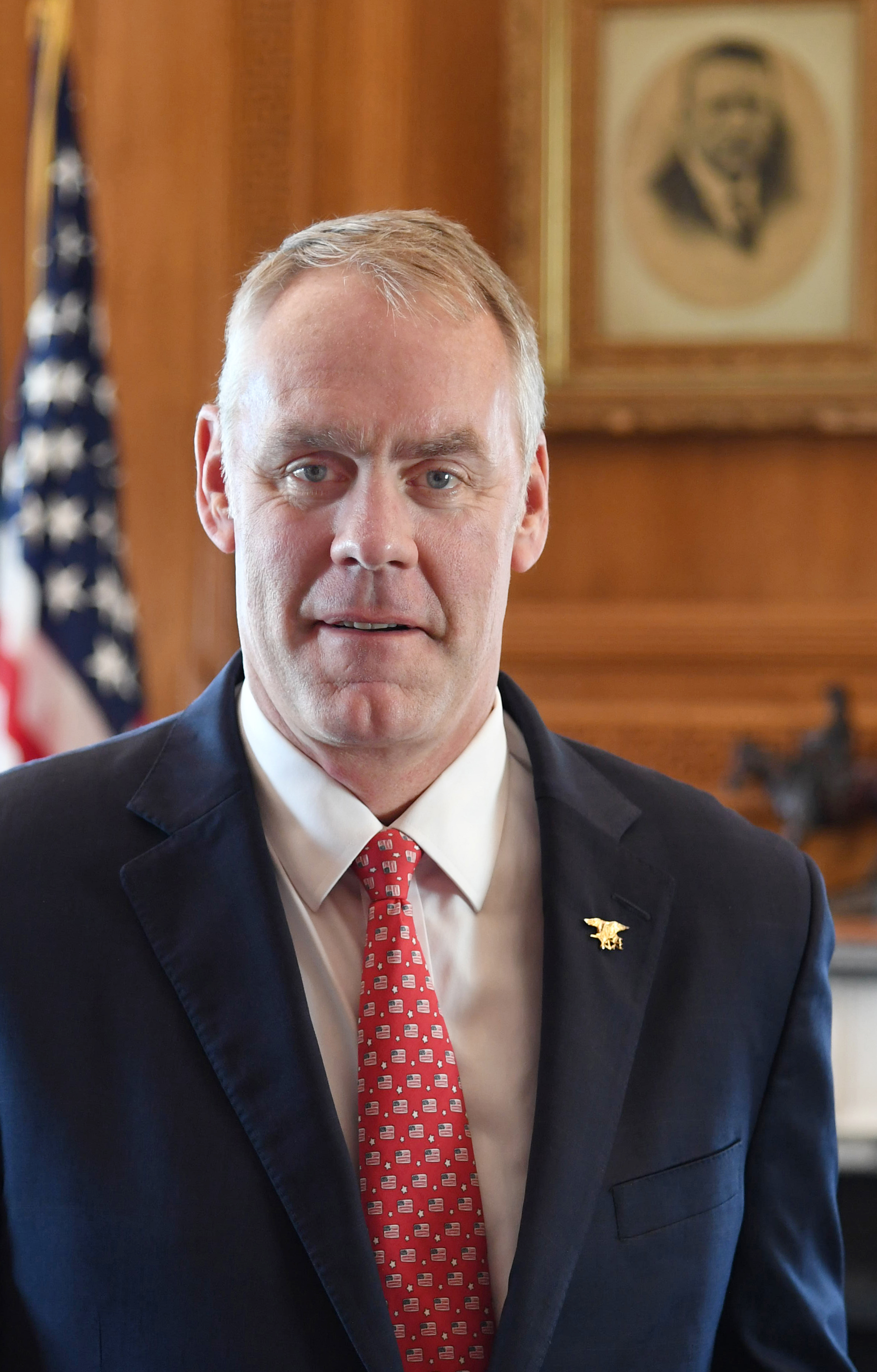
Ryan Zinke, 52nd United States Secretary of the Interior

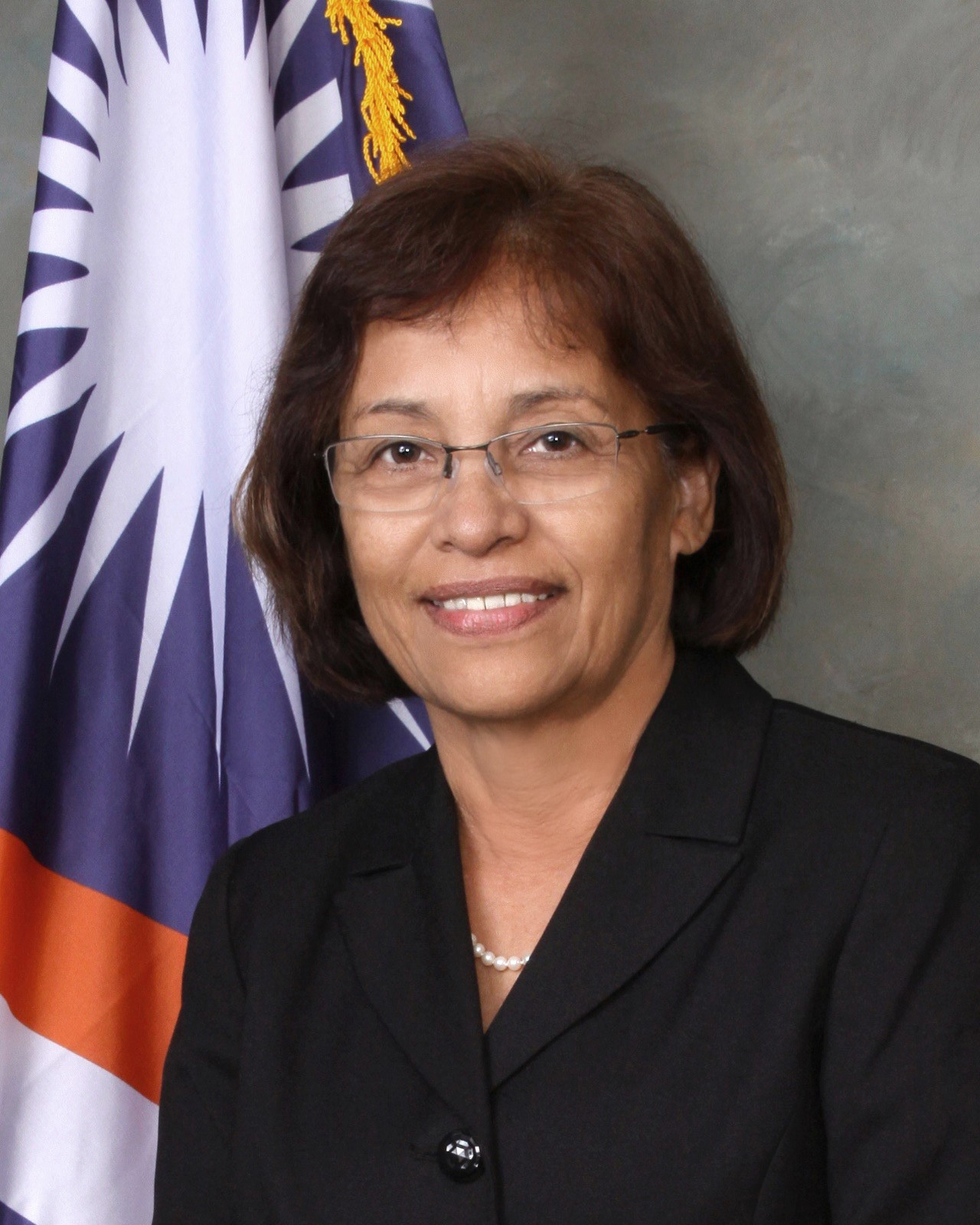
Hilda Heine, President of the Marshall Islands

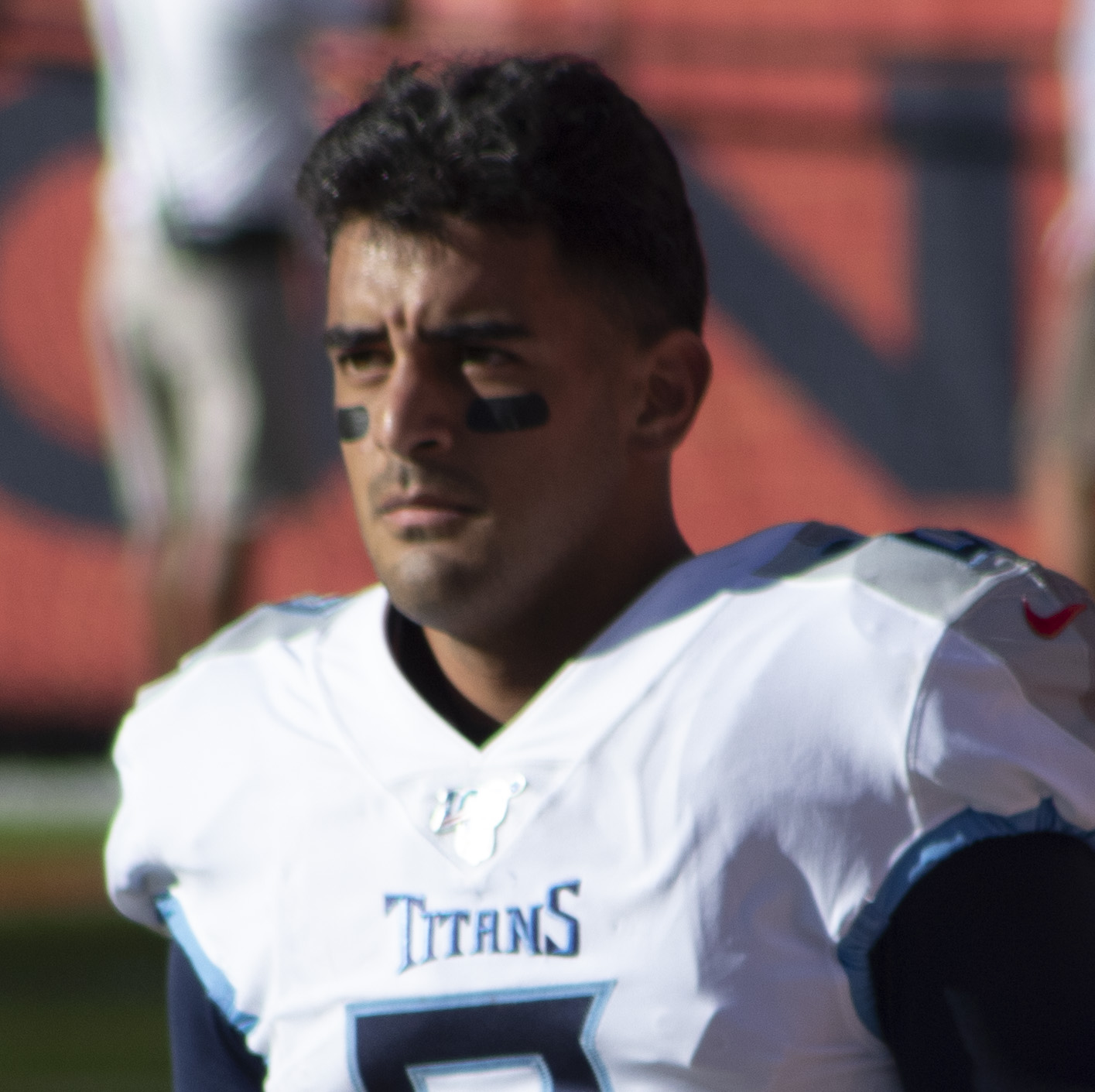
Marcus Mariota, current NFL Player

Alumni include at least two Nobel Laureates, five members of the National National Academy of Sciences, 16 Pulitzer Prize winners, who have won a combined 20 awards, 19 Rhodes Scholars and 5 Marshall Scholars.

There are more than 195,000 University of Oregon alumni around the world. The Ford Alumni Center, adjacent to Matthew Knight Arena, houses an interactive exhibit. The UO Alumni Association is also based out of this facility.

Prominent alumni include: academic leaders Lee Bollinger (president of Columbia University and former president of the University of Michigan), Gene Block (chancellor of UCLA), and Asher Cohen (president of the Hebrew University of Jerusalem), TV host Ann Curry, author and counter-culture figure Ken Kesey (One Flew Over the Cuckoo's Nest), businessman Phil Knight (founded Nike, Inc. in Eugene), NFL quarterbacks Marcus Mariota (2014 Heisman Trophy winner) and Justin Herbert (2019 William V. Campbell Trophy recipient and 2020 NFL Offensive Rookie of the Year), screenwriter Stephen J. Cannell, author Chuck Palahniuk (Fight Club), cognitive scientist and author Douglas Hofstadter (Gödel, Escher, Bach), biochemist Pamela Bjorkman, U.S. Senator Ron Wyden, American sportscaster and former professional football player Ahmad Rashad, professional basketball players Luke Ridnour, Luke Jackson and Sabrina Ionescu, former American football quarterback and current sportscaster Dan Fouts, actress Kaitlin Olson, Circuit Court Judge Hollie Pihl, A cappella vocalist and YouTuber Peter Hollens, trumpeter and musician Tony Glausi, Hilda Heine (president of the Marshall Islands), and Coach Mark Few (coach of Men's Basketball Gonzaga Bulldogs.)

=== Faculty and staff ===
Current University of Oregon faculty and researchers include 1 Nobel Prize laureate, and 11 members of the National Academy of Sciences Furthermore, two Oregon based researchers have been awarded the President's National Medal of Science.

Notable current and former faculty and staff includes: renowned Canadian architect Arthur Erikson, biochemist and biophysicist Brian Matthews (also known for Matthews correlation coefficient), neuroscientist Michael Posner, behavioral psychologist and risk researcher Paul Slovic, molecular biologist and geneticist Franklin Stahl (noted for Meselson–Stahl experiment) which he performed at Caltech, molecular biologist George Streisinger (pioneered the use of Zebrafish in biological research), lichenologist Martha Allen Sherwood, and 2012 Nobel Prize in Physics winner Knight Research Professor David Wineland, formerly of NIST and the University of Colorado Boulder.

Notable former athletic department staff includes: track coach Bill Bowerman (known for co-founding Nike, Inc.) and football coach Chip Kelly (also known for coaching Philadelphia Eagles and San Francisco 49ers).
