= Global Scholars Hall =

Building in Oregon

Coordinates: 44.04282°N 123.067035°W

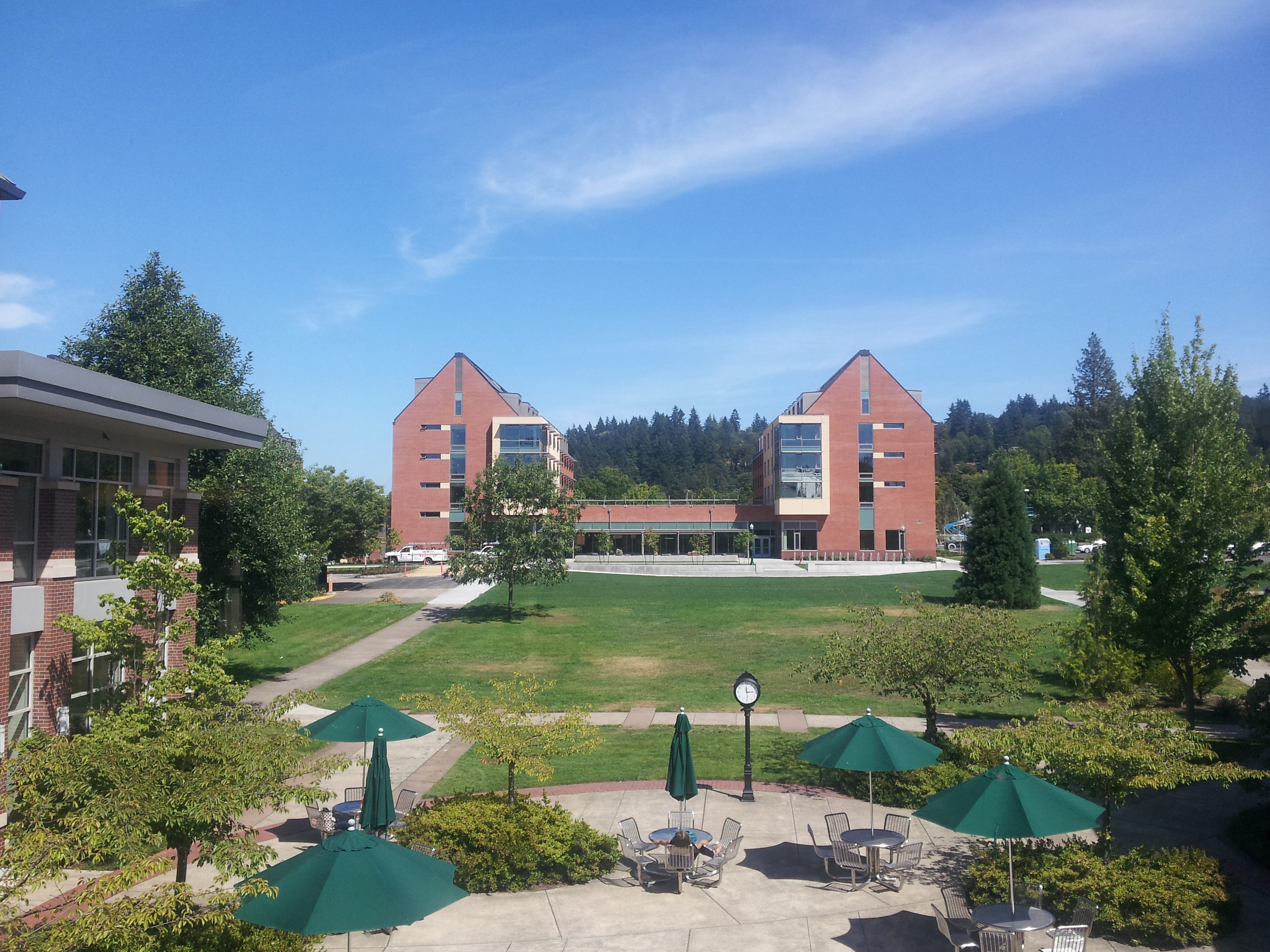
Global Scholars Hall (GSH) central and south towers as seen from the Knight Law School

The Global Scholars Hall (GSH) is a building on the University of Oregon campus in Eugene, Oregon. Opened in Fall 2012, the 185,000 square foot building serves as an undergraduate residence hall, dining facility, library, classroom, and performing arts complex. The construction of GSH was funded mostly by state bonds and student housing fees.

As a residence hall, GSH serves 450 upperclassmen, language immersion students, and Robert D. Clark Honors College students.

== Lawsuit ==
In March 2015, University of Oregon filed an 8.5 million dollar lawsuit against Hoffman Construction Company, Zimmer Gunsul Frasca Architects, and Catena Consulting Engineers over the construction of Global Scholars Hall. The complaint alleged that the concrete floors were uneven which caused structural stress on the building including cracks in the floors, walls, and ceilings. It also attributed the malfunction of doors, windows, furniture, and other built-ins to flaws in the concrete.

Allegedly, the type of concrete slabs used by the construction and design firms were to blame for the structural problems observed in GSH. The university claimed that the companies responsible were aware of these problems and had multiple opportunities to correct them. Residents of the hall were notified of the lawsuit through email on the same day it was filed, although the structure was determined to be safe to inhabit after multiple inspections.

In December 2016, the UO Board of Trustees voted to accept a settlement of $6.9 million from the firms named in the complaint.

== Images ==
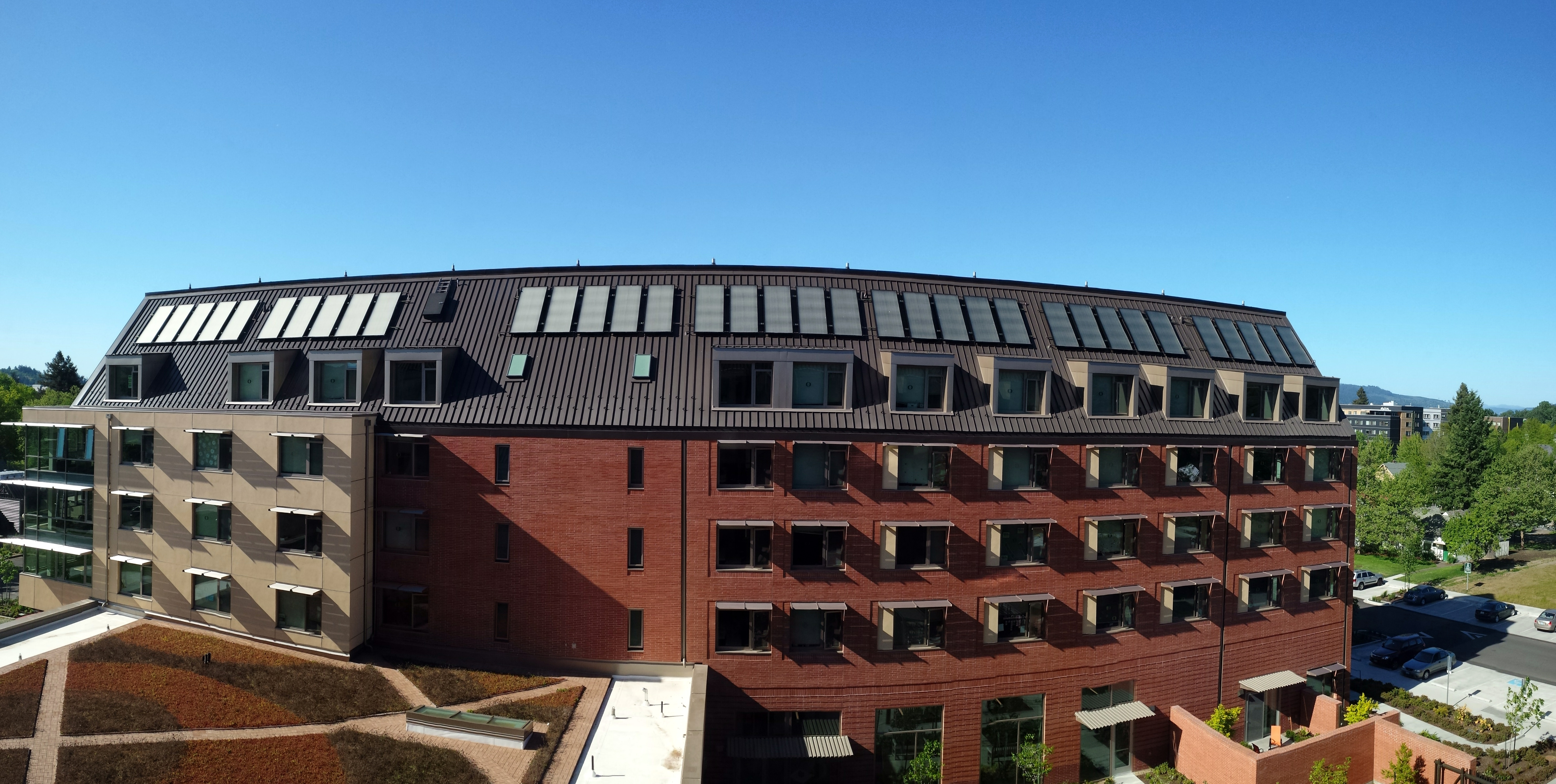
GSH central tower

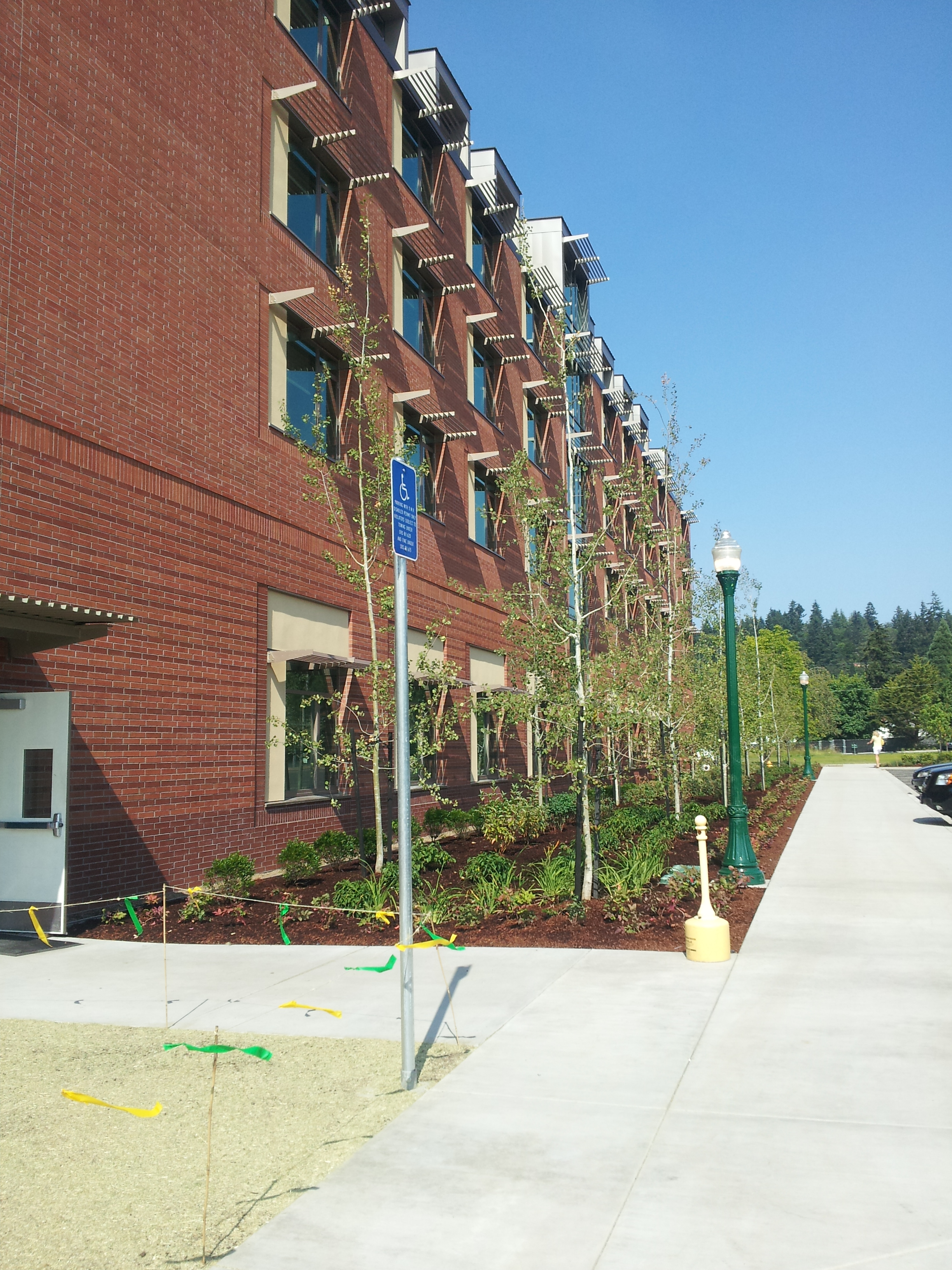
GSH south tower

== See also ==
- University of Oregon campus
