= Face the Crowd =

Face the Crowd may refer to:

- "Face the Crowd", single by Demian 1971
- "Face the Crowd", song by Beady Eye

== See also ==
- Facing the Crowd, two outdoor sculptures by American artist Michael Stutz in Portland, Oregon
