= You Are Here (sculpture) =

Sculpture in Portland, Oregon

- The sculpture in 2013
- Artist: Ron Baron
- Year: 2012
- Type: Sculpture
- Medium: Bronze
- Dimensions: 3.4 m × 2.7 m × 0.91 m (11 ft × 9 ft × 3 ft)
- Location: Portland, Oregon, United States; 45.52177°N 122.69086°W
- Owner: City of Portland and Multnomah County Public Art Collection courtesy of the Regional Arts & Culture Council

You Are Here is an outdoor 2012 bronze sculpture by American artist Ron Baron, installed at Providence Park in Portland, Oregon, United States. It is part of the City of Portland and Multnomah County Public Art Collection courtesy of the Regional Arts & Culture Council, which administers the work.

== Description and history ==
Ron Baron's You Are Here was completed and installed in the northeast courtyard of Providence Park (then known as Jeld-Wen Field) in downtown Portland in 2012. The bronze sculpture was funded by the City of Portland's Percent for Art program and measures 11 feet (3.4 m) x 9 feet (2.7 m) x 3 feet (0.91 m). Baron recalled about the work's origins:

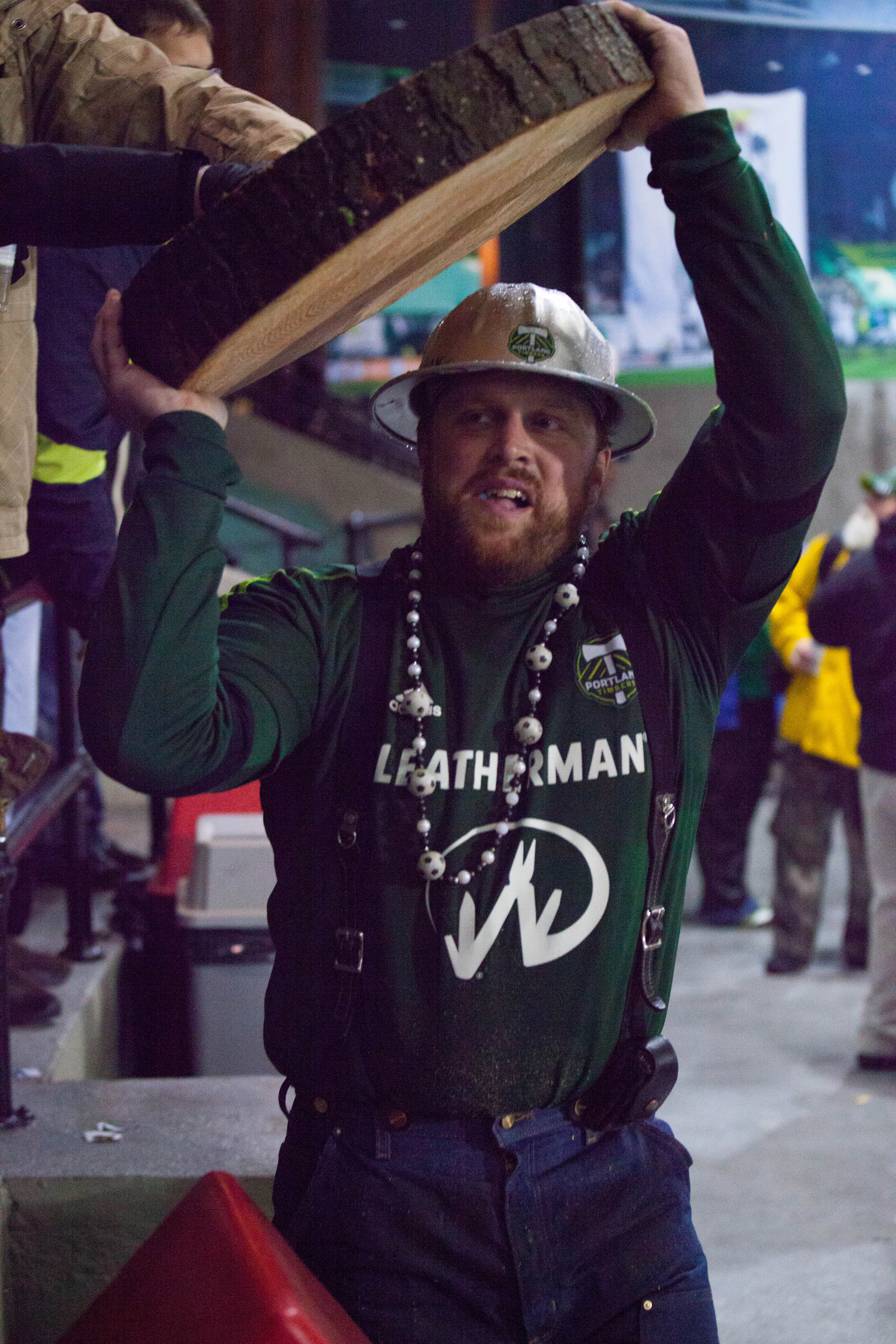
The artist was inspired to create You Are Here after seeing Timber Joey slice off a log round like the one he is seen carrying here (2012).

During a stormy night in 2011, I attended my first Timbers game and watched in awe as Timber Joey revved up his chainsaw and sliced off a log round medallion after a scored goal. The hard rain fell, the drenched crowd cheered, chants were sung and the log round was raised in glory. Inspired by what I'd witnessed, the idea for You Are Here crystallized and realization that I wanted to create an artwork that honored this ritual and the rich local history underfoot.

Furthermore, he said of the sculpture:

You Are Here pays homage to the chronology of events that have taken place within this historic stadium and the Goose Hollow neighborhood over the past 150 years. My intention is to venerate the annals of culture, commerce and sports activities through a collection of 'unearthed' artifacts—each a symbol referencing a particular moment in time. You Are Here is a time-capsule that commemorates the past, glorifies the present and celebrates achievement.

The sculpture is part of the City of Portland and Multnomah County Public Art Collection courtesy of the Regional Arts & Culture Council, which administers the work.

== See also ==
- 2012 in art
- Facing the Crowd (2001), a sculpture series installed outside Providence Park
