= Providence Park =

Sports stadium in Portland, Oregon, United States

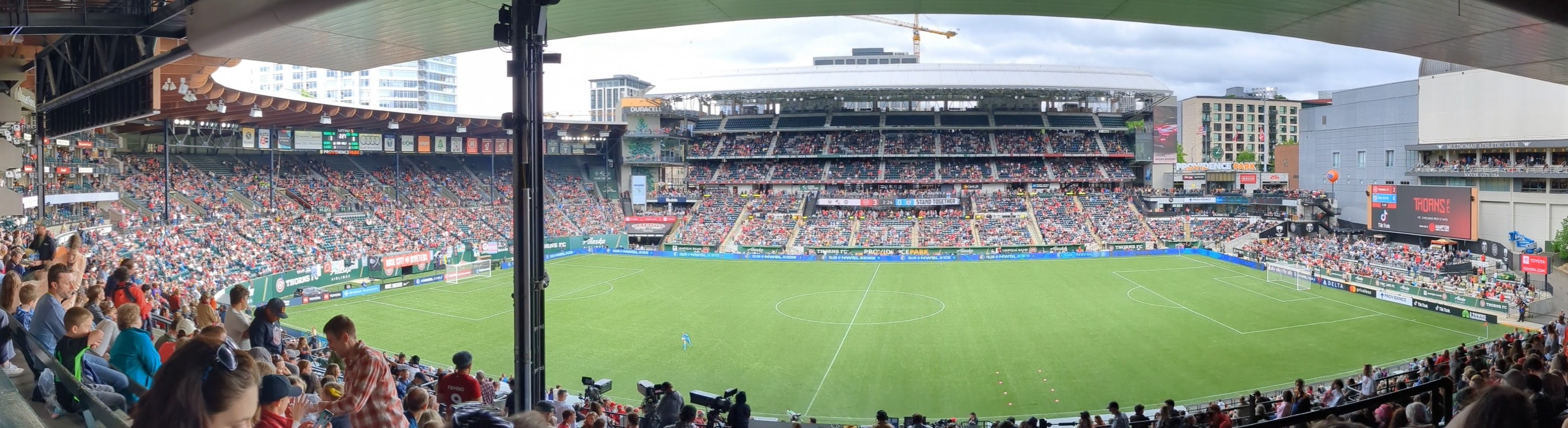

- Location in Portland Location in Oregon Location in the United States
- Former names: Multnomah Field (1893–1926); Multnomah Stadium (1926–1965); Civic Stadium (1966–2000); PGE Park (2001–2010); Jeld-Wen Field (2011–2014)
- Address: 1844 SW Morrison
- Location: Portland, Oregon, U.S.
- Coordinates: 45°31′17″N 122°41′30″W
- Owner: City of Portland
- Operator: Peregrine Sports, LLC
- Capacity: 24,686
- Surface: FieldTurf Revolution
- Field size: 110 yd × 75 yd (100.58 m × 68.58 m)
- Public transit: MAX Light Rail at Providence Park; Bus Service; 6, 15, 18, 19, 20, 24, 26, 51, 55, 63

Construction
- Groundbreaking: May 6, 1926
- Opened: October 9, 1926
- Renovated: 1956, 1982, 2001, 2011, 2019
- Cost: $502,000 ($9.13 million in 2025 dollars) Other: List: $36 million (2010 renovation) ($51.5 million in 2025 dollars); $85 million (2018–19 renovation) ($107 million in 2025 dollars)
- Architects: A. E. Doyle; Morris H. Whitehouse & Associates
- General contractor: Hansen-Hammond Company

Tenants
- Portland Timbers (MLS) (2011–present); Portland Thorns FC (NWSL) (2013–present); Portland Nitro (AUDL) (2022–present); Portland Timbers 2 (MLSNP) (2023–present); Former tenants: Soccer: Vancouver Whitecaps FC (MLS) (2020); Portland Timbers 2 (USLC) (2017–2019); Portland Timbers U23s (PDL) (2009–2016); Portland Timbers (A-League/USL-1/USSF D2) (2001–2010); Portland Timbers (WSA/APSL) (1985–1990); Portland Timbers (NASL) (1975–1982) Football: Oregon State (NCAA) (partial schedule, 1909–1986, 2022); Portland State (NCAA) (1947–1999, 2001–2009, 2011–2017); Oregon (NCAA) (partial schedule, 1894–1970); Portland Breakers (USFL) (1985); Portland Storm/Thunder (WFL) (1973–1975) Baseball: Portland Beavers (PCL) (1956–1972, 1978–1993, 2001–2010); Portland Rockies (NWL) (1995–2000); Portland Mavericks (NWL) (1973–1977)

Website
- timbers.com/providencepark

Providence Park (Note: Formerly Jeld-Wen Field, PGE Park, Civic Stadium, originally Multnomah Stadium, and from 1893 until the stadium was built, Multnomah Field) is an outdoor soccer venue located in the Goose Hollow neighborhood of Portland, Oregon, United States. It is the home of the Portland Timbers of Major League Soccer (MLS) and Portland Thorns FC of the National Women's Soccer League (NWSL). Providence Park is currently the oldest facility to be configured as a soccer-specific stadium for use by an MLS team, and is one of the most historic grounds used by any United States professional soccer team. It has existed in rudimentary form since 1893, and as a complete stadium since 1926.

Providence Park has been the home of the Timbers since 1975. The stadium has been host to several major United States soccer events including U.S. national team matches, Soccer Bowl '77, the 1999 and 2003 FIFA Women's World Cup, the 2013 CONCACAF Gold Cup, the 2014 MLS All-Star Game, the 2015 NWSL Championship Game, and MLS Cup 2021.

The Portland-based Multnomah Athletic Club was founded in 1891 and soon constructed the stadium for their amateur sports teams beginning in 1893. In 1926, the facility was expanded into a complete stadium, including the upper seating bowl and the wooden benches which can still be found in the park. In 1956, the stadium was renovated in earnest for the first time to reflect its growing usage in the community. In 1966 the City of Portland purchased the park and renamed it Civic Stadium.

It was renovated in 2001 to accommodate the Timbers and the Portland Beavers, while the naming rights of the stadium were purchased by Portland General Electric and it was renamed PGE Park. In 2011, the park underwent renovations again, this time so it could accommodate the Portland Timbers MLS franchise and a year later the stadium name rights were sold, this time to Jeld-Wen (Jeld-Wen Field). In 2014, the name was changed again to Providence Park after Providence Health & Services bought the naming rights.

A 2019 expansion raised the capacity to 25,218 and added a multi-level facade to the East End. Until 2023, the Portland Timbers sold out every game at Providence Park since moving to MLS in 2011, and the Thorns set a single-game National Women's Soccer League attendance record in August 2019 with a sell-out crowd of the same capacity. In 2019, both clubs ranked among the top ten in attendance among professional soccer teams (men's or women's) in the United States and Canada.

== Description ==
Providence Park is an outdoor soccer stadium that houses the MLS Portland Timbers and NWSL Portland Thorns. The stadium is owned by the City of Portland and managed by Timbers owner Peregrine Sports, LLC.

The stadium sits on a rectangular block bounded by Southwest Morrison Street, Southwest 18th Avenue, the Multnomah Athletic Club building and Southwest Salmon Street, and Southwest 20th Avenue.

The Multnomah Athletic Club (MAC), an athletic club in downtown Portland that originally constructed the venue, stands next door; the windows on the north side of the club overlook the field.

The Interstate 405 freeway in Portland is also known locally as the Stadium Freeway and travels near the stadium. In addition, the Providence Park MAX Light Rail station is across the street. The property slopes significantly downhill from the south end to the north end, with the result that the playing surface sits well below street level. The elevation at street level is approximately 110 feet (35 m) above sea level.

== History ==
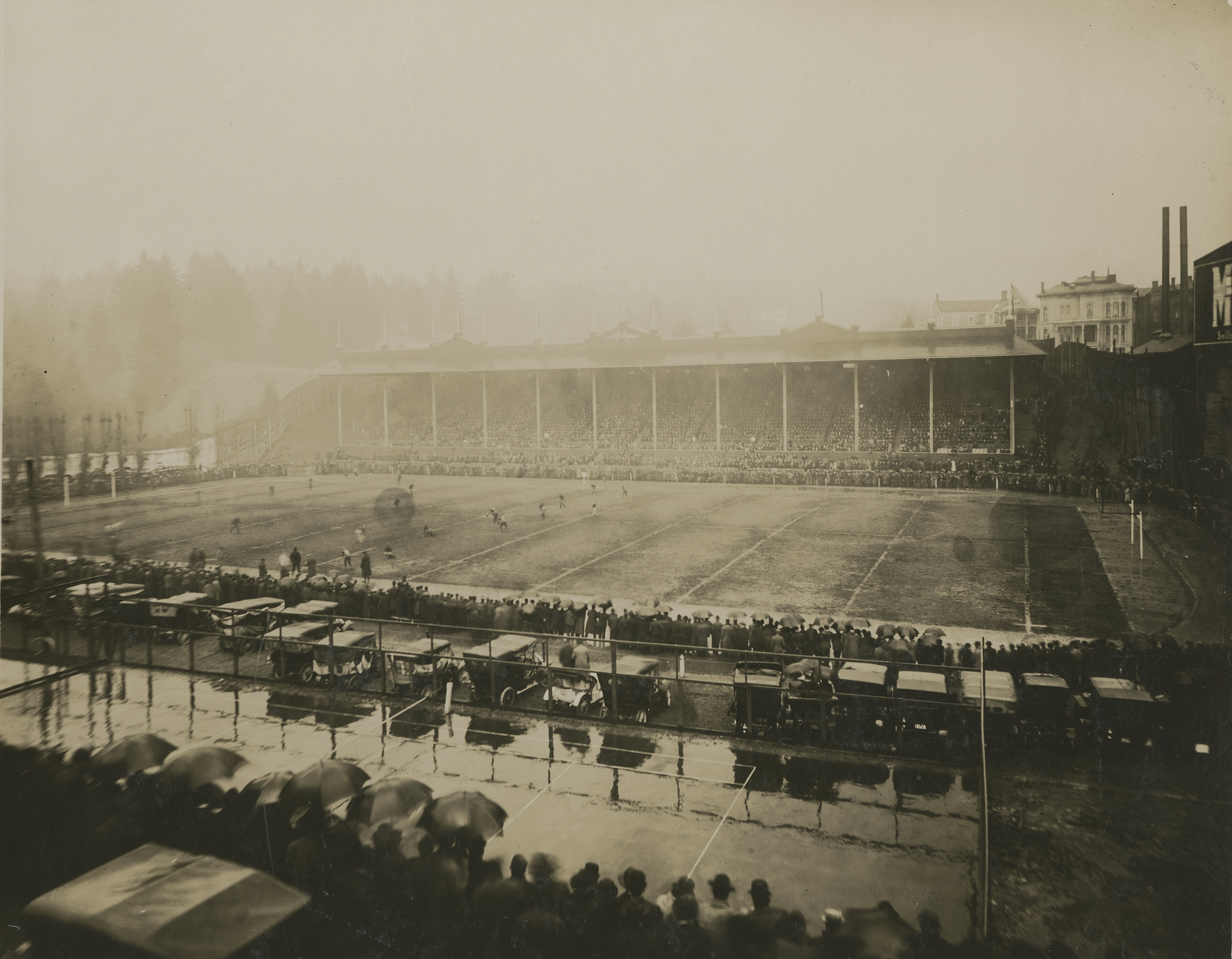
Civil War Game held at Multnomah Stadium in 1908

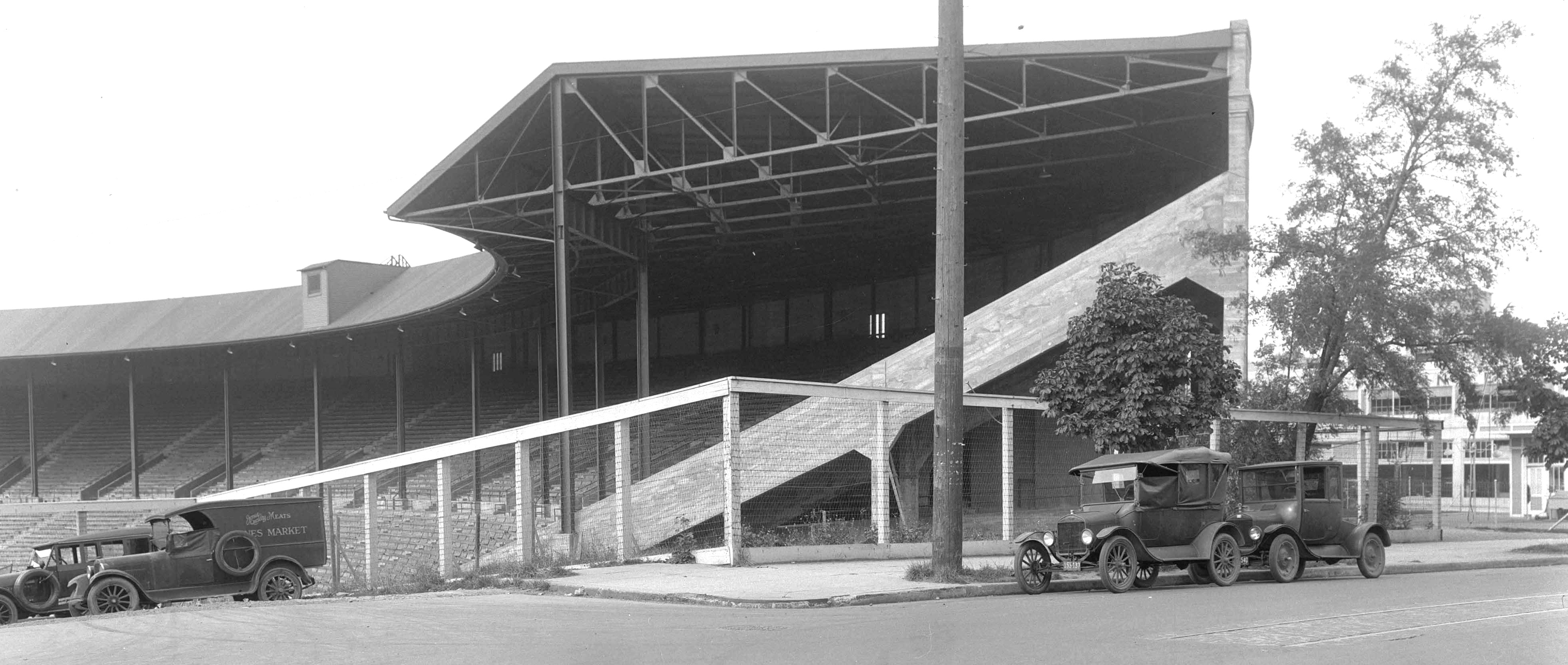
The stadium photographed from the street in 1930

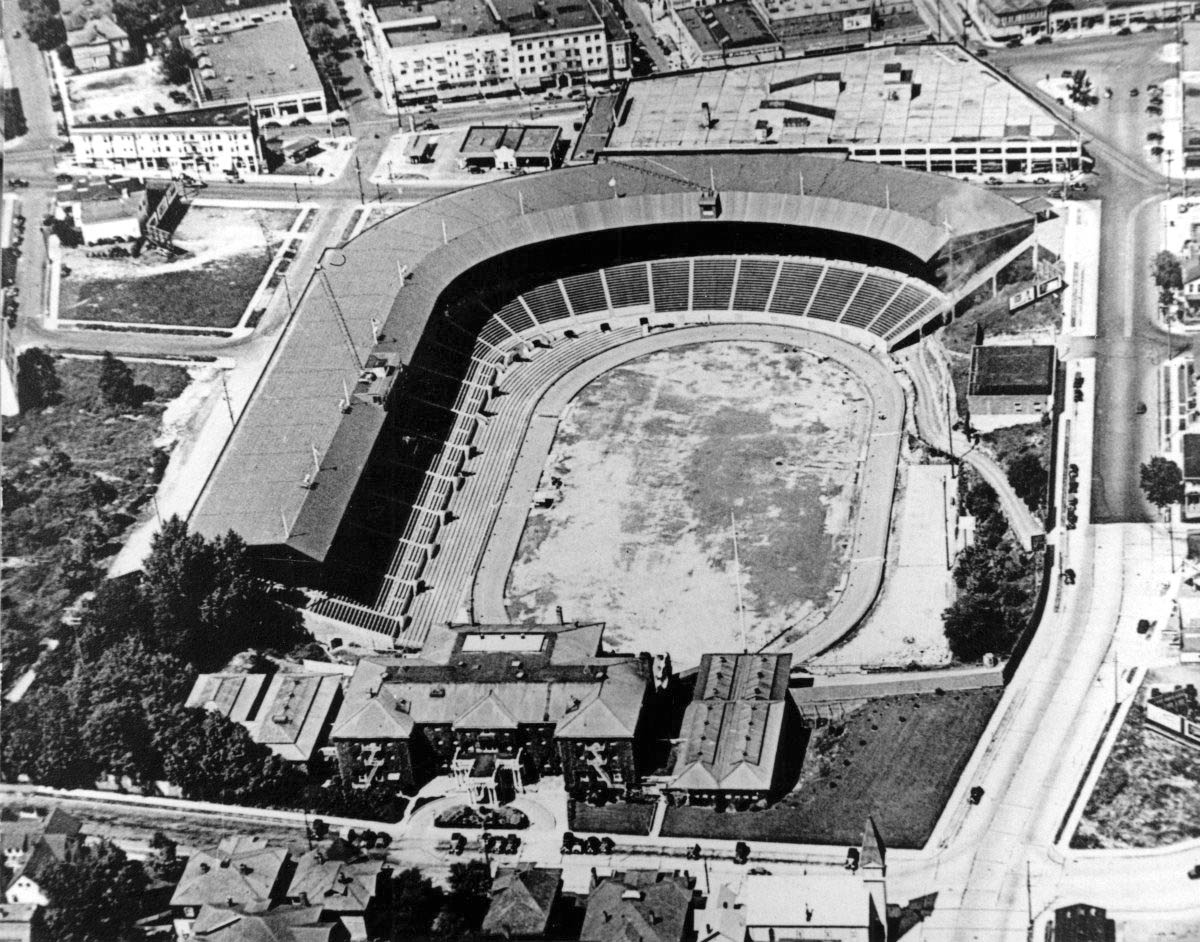
Aerial view of the stadium in 1940

Since 1893, the site had been home to Multnomah Field, which consisted of sports fields with various grandstands. Before the MAC developed the site as an athletic field, it was a large Chinese vegetable garden, supplying produce to much of Portland. In 1912, the distinctive Multnomah Athletic Club, which currently borders the south end of the stadium, was constructed. The overarching stadium was completed in 1926 for $502,000, and named "Multnomah Civic Stadium" after the club.

The site was used for college football (including seven Civil War games between the University of Oregon and Oregon State University), cricket matches and greyhound racing. Well into the 1960s, most significant football games hosted by Oregon and Oregon State were held at this site because of its capacity. Oregon played in 107 games at Multnomah/Civic Stadium between 1894 and 1970. The University of Washington played all its road games against Oregon and Oregon State at Multnomah Field/Multnomah Stadium between 1923 (OSU) and 1924 (Oregon) until 1966 (OSU) and 1967 (Oregon). The site also hosted the Portland Rose Festival.

In 1956, the Portland Beavers moved to the stadium after their original field, Vaughn Street Park, was condemned. After two attempts for a new domed stadium in Delta Park were defeated by voters in 1964, the city looked to purchase what was already in existence. In 1966, the Multnomah Athletic Club sold the stadium for $2.1 million to the city of Portland, which renamed it "Civic Stadium". The city government rejected several proposed renovation plans, including construction of a 57,000-seat domed stadium, and adding a second deck supported by helium-filled balloons. Prior to the 2011 MLS season, the stadium was renamed "Jeld-Wen Field" from "PGE Park", in a partnership with Klamath Falls-based company Jeld-Wen. Jeld-Wen is a manufacturer of windows and doors, leading to the stadium's nickname, "The House of Pane." In 2014, the stadium was renamed "Providence Park" after a partnership with Providence Health & Services was announced.

Kerry Tymchuk, executive director of the Oregon Historical Society, summarized the stadium's history: "Providence Park has been home to some of the most iconic moments in Oregon sports history. It also ranks with such classic venues as Wrigley Field and Fenway Park as a stadium that has stood the test of time and that is uniquely part and parcel of the city in which it resides. ... Portland is a city that prides itself on its uniqueness. While many major cities have chosen to replace historic sports stadiums with modern domes or complexes, Portland has chosen to retain much of the original architecture and charm of one of architect A.E. Doyle's most beloved creations."

=== Renovations ===
==== 1956 ====
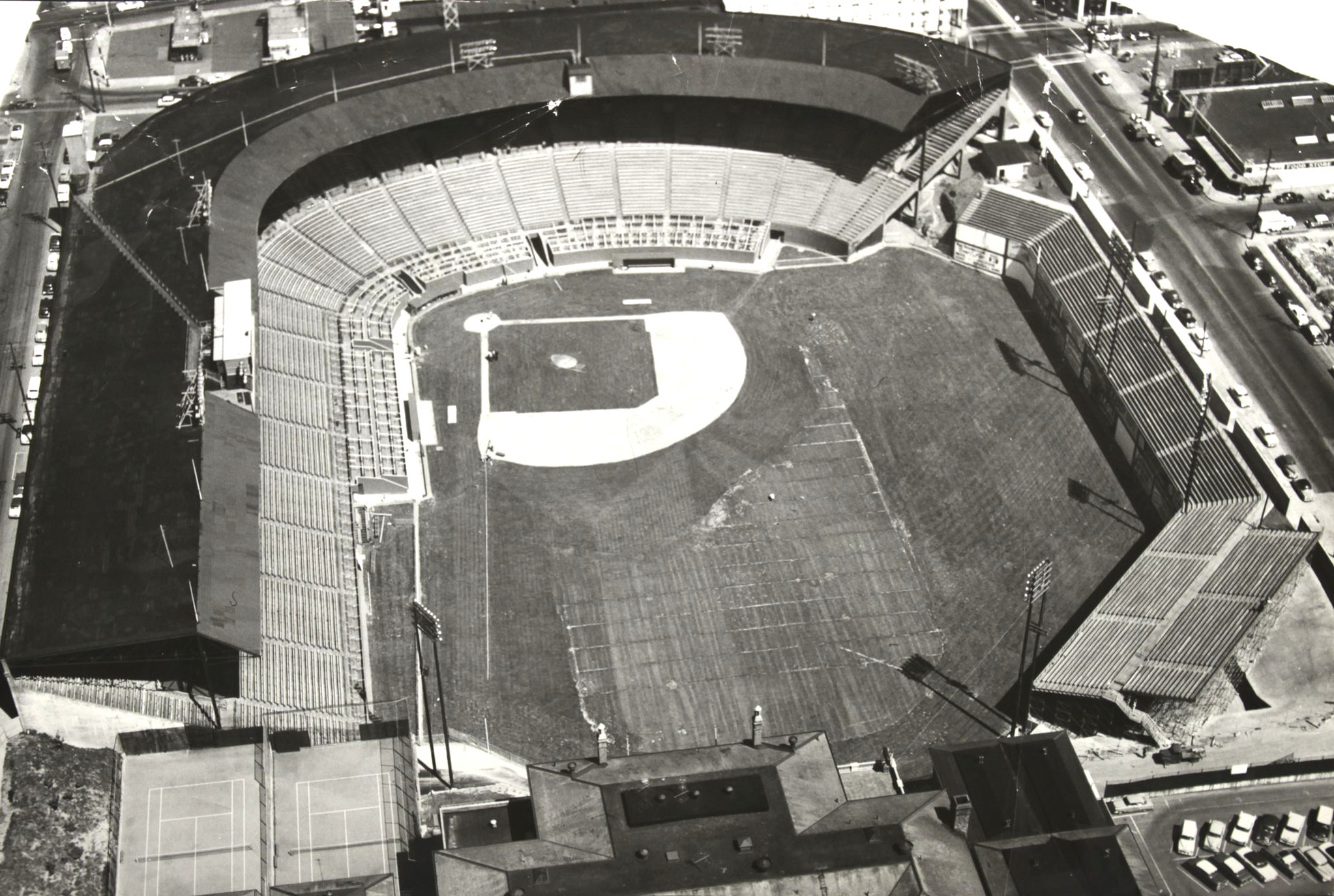
Providence Park in 1956, showing the baseball field

The first major renovation to Providence Park after its full construction in 1926 came in 1956, when the Portland Beavers moved to what was then called "Multnomah Stadium", from the dilapidated cross-town Vaughn Street Park. For the first time, permanent East End seating was constructed, as well as a large ticketed section in the southeast corner of the stadium. The East End seats were all constructed above an outfield wall, and box seats were built in the stadium for the first time. Along with the expansion came the demolition of the greyhound racing track, which was constructed in 1933.

==== 1982 ====
In November 1980, Portland voters passed a ballot measure that provided the city (who had owned the stadium since 1966) with a much-needed $9.5 million to improve the foundation, concourse and replace the roof. The money allowed the city to replace the aging roof, adding an extended roofline out of laminated Oregon timber. The new roof covered a much higher percentage of seats and included the construction of a new press box, which was finished by winter 1982.

==== 2001 ====
In November 2000, the Portland City Council authorized bonds to finance a renovation of then-Civic Stadium. A $38.5 million renovation took place in 2001, upgrading the seating and concourse area, and adding new luxury suites and club seats. The renovation improved the structural soundness of the facility by adding over 750 tons of steel, and introduced a new sound system. The renovation also included some retro-features, such as a manually operated scoreboard. At that point, PGE bought the naming rights and it became "PGE Park".

The 2001 renovation also removed the remaining seats along 18th Avenue and added in the first electronic video board in the park, modernizing the park for soccer and minor-league baseball. The stadium was temporarily expanded for the 2003 FIFA Women's World Cup with bleachers along the east and south ends to bring soccer capacity from 19,556 to over 28,000. A grass surface was also installed for the tournament over the existing NeXturf artificial surface.

==== 2011 ====
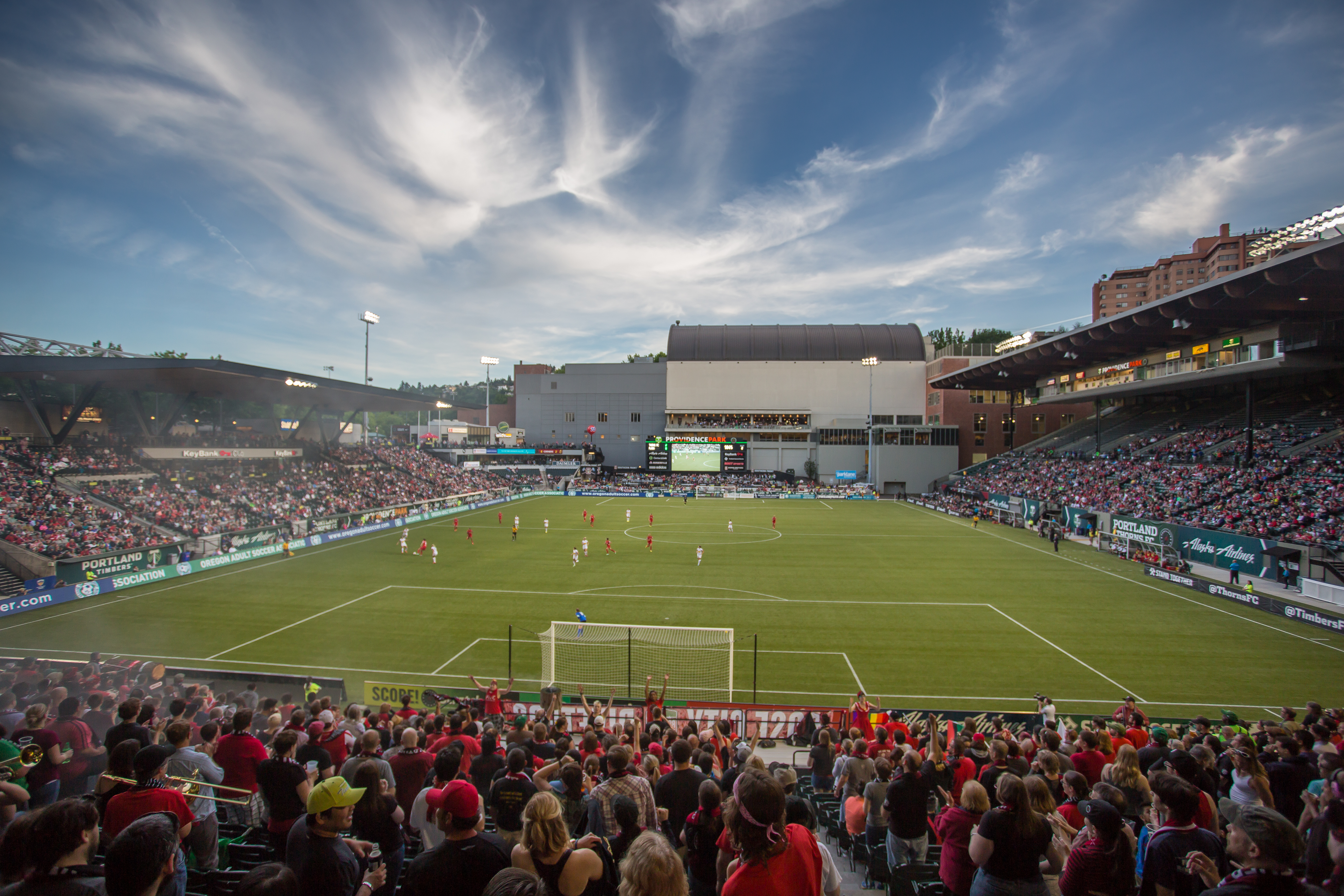
Soccer game at Providence Park in May 2014

In July 2009, after attempts to both find a new home for an MLS franchise and identify a site for a new home for the Portland Beavers, the Portland City Council approved a $31 million renovation to make PGE Park ready for the 2011 Major League Soccer season, by reconfiguring the stadium primarily for soccer and football. The decision led to the departure of the Beavers.

A presentation to the Portland Design Commission indicated that 5,000 seats would be added, bringing capacity to about 22,000, but with only about 18,000 available for use on a regular basis.

The renovation met Major League Soccer standards, introduced a new playing surface, which shifted west and north, and added space on the east and south sides, with new seating areas and new amenities. The Lighthouse Impact 16 main video screen was designed by Anthony James Partners and features over 74 square meters (800 sq ft) of LED video. A Lighthouse B10 pitchside display runs the length of the East End and portions of the north and south ends and is over 152 meters (499 ft) long. As the project was nearing completion, it was revealed to be $5 million over budget, making the total cost of the renovation $36 million. The agreement between the city and Portland Timbers owner Merritt Paulson meant that Paulson was responsible for any cost overruns larger than $1 million.

The newly renovated stadium made its début on April 14, 2011, when Major League Soccer's Timbers defeated the Chicago Fire, 4–2. The announced attendance at Timbers games in 2011 was 18,627, a sell-out.

A few thousand seats were added for two games late in the 2011 season to bring the capacity to 20,323. About 2,000 seats were opened up for the 2012 season, bringing capacity to 20,438. Following the 2012 season in which the Timbers' average attendance was 20,438, during the 2012–13 off-season the Timbers widened the pitch for the 2013 season, adding 2 yards (1.8 m) on each side to achieve a width of 74 yards (68 m). The team widened the pitch by another yard in 2014, for a total pitch size of 110 by 75 yards (101 m × 69 m).

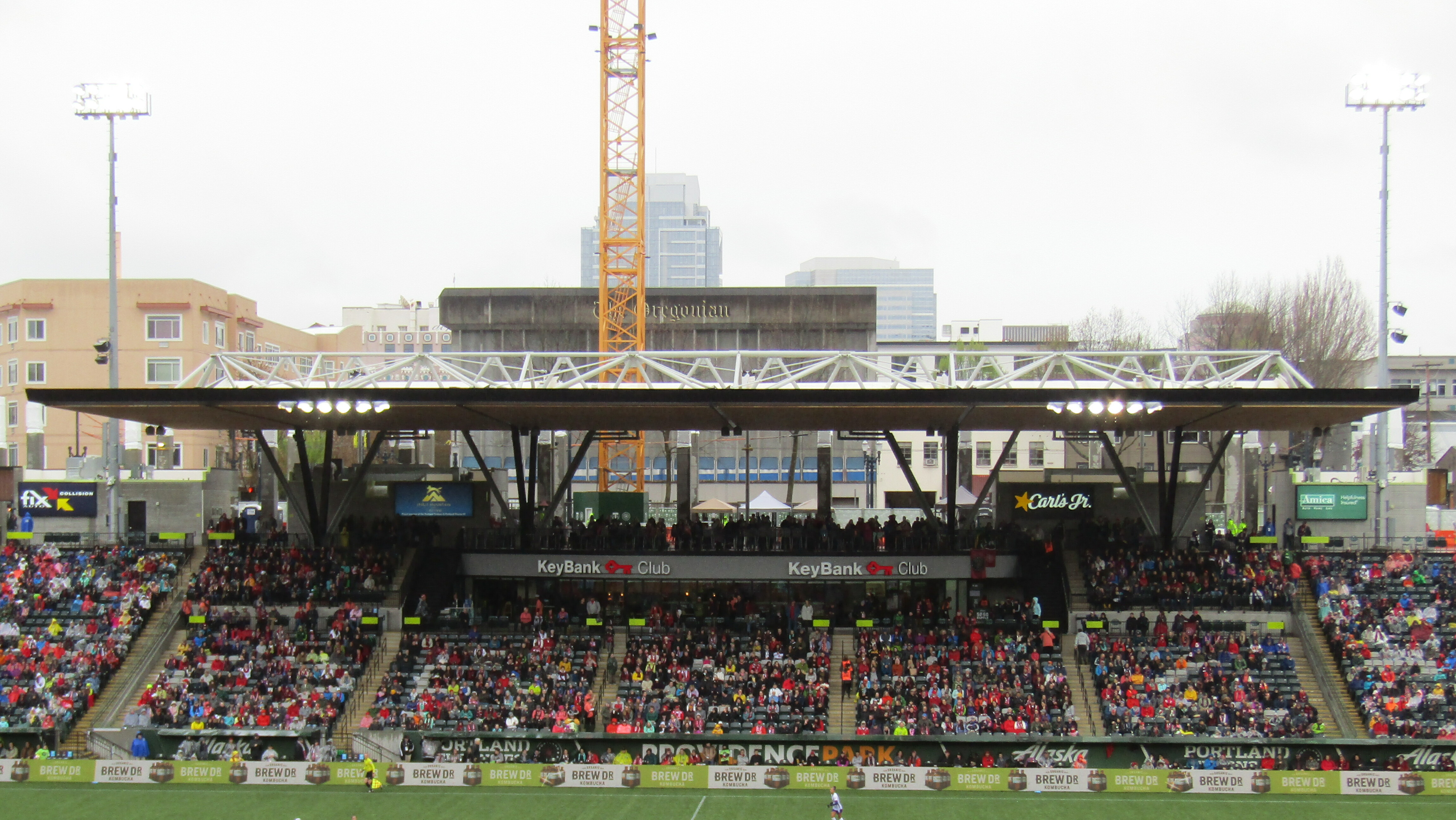
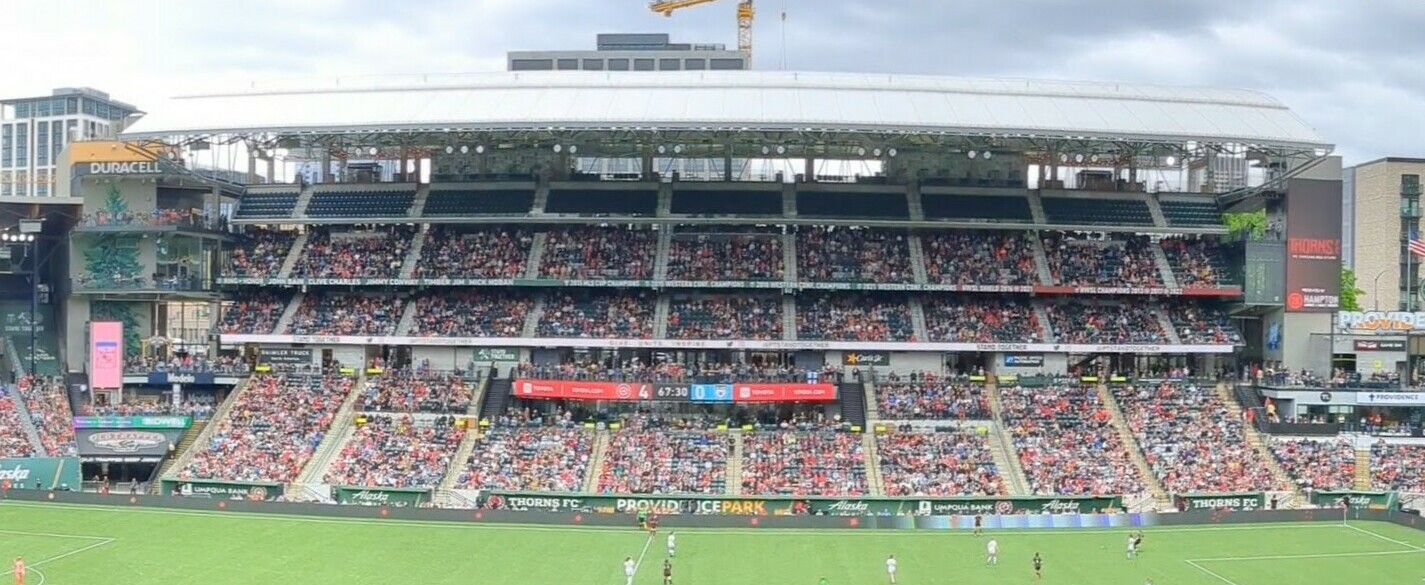
Providence Park's east stands during a Thorns match in May 2018 (left), and after expansion in May 2023 (right)

==== 2019 ====
In April 2017, the Portland Timbers unveiled a US$85 million renovation plan to add roughly 4,000 new seats to the East End. Timbers' president of business Mike Golub stated, "We felt it was imperative to see how we could transform the stadium and add capacity to both meet the demand that we have for tickets and also position the club to be viable and competitive for years to come", referencing the Timbers' current season ticket waitlist of approximately 13,000. The renovation was privately funded and brought the stadium to a capacity of 25,218, which was the fourth-highest of any soccer-specific venue in MLS.

The club partnered with Portland-based Allied Works Architecture to design the expansion, and began construction in late 2017, with the goal of having the renovated stadium ready in late May or early June 2019.

The expanded Providence Park opened for the first time on June 1, 2019, as the Timbers hosted LAFC, selling out the capacity of 25,218. Included in the $85 million renovation were the addition of three decks of new seats, two new video boards and a modern edge-to-edge roof, as well as updated LED lighting throughout the park. The lowest tier of the new addition is a premium seating section named Tanner Ridge, a reference to Tanner Creek under the stadium, and includes separate food and beverage options from the rest of the stadium.

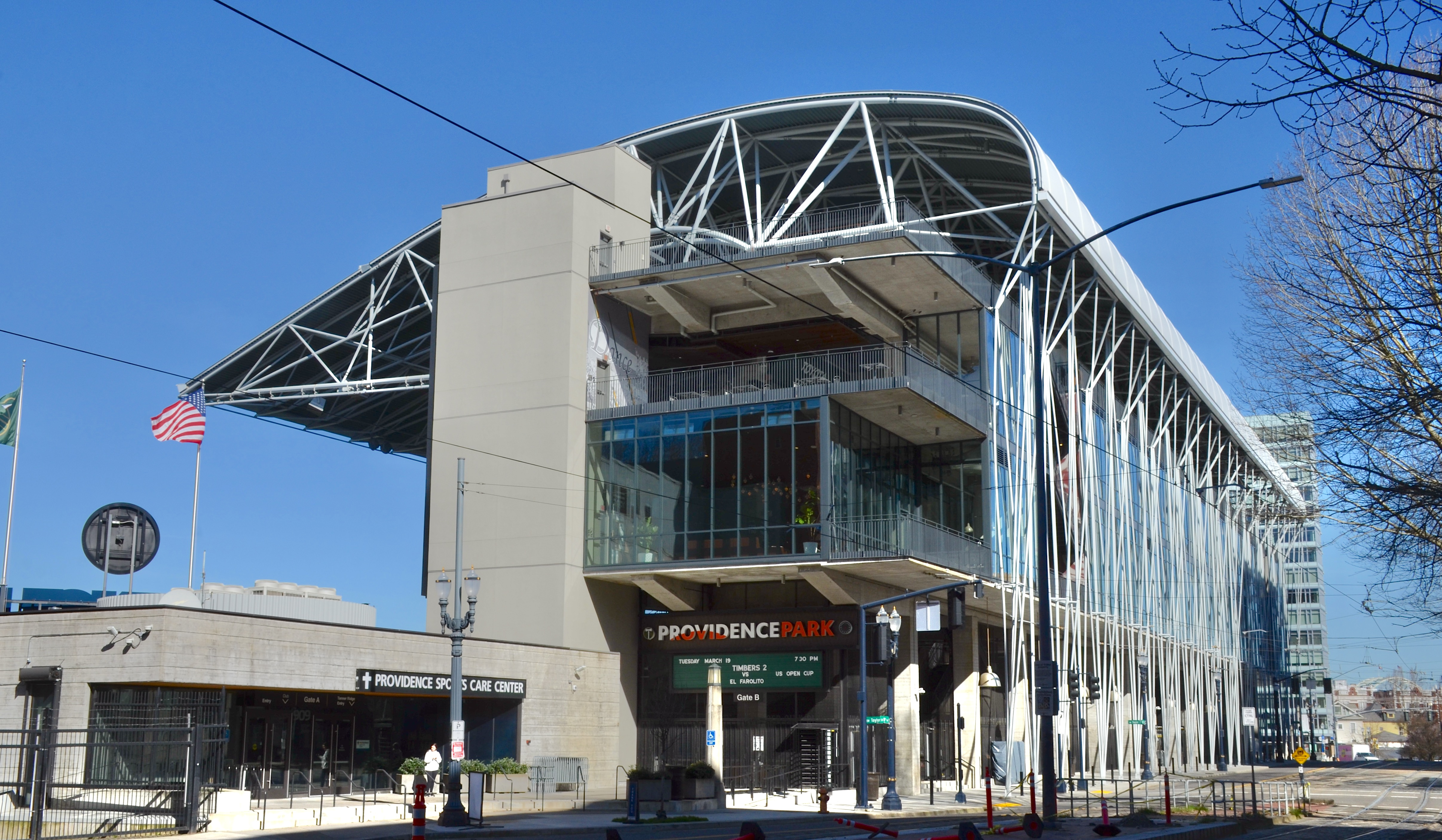
Exterior of the stadium's east end after its major expansion

The renovated stand on the East End was the largest seat expansion in Providence Park history. The vertically stacked stand resembles Boca Juniors' stadium La Bombonera and was inspired by Shakespeare's Globe Theatre. The new stands also resemble an original, unrealized design from 1926 for the stadium that shows two-story stands. White seats in the added upper decks spell out "SC USA", a reference to Portland's NASL-era nickname of "Soccer City USA." This added to existing seats in the east stand that spell out "PORTLAND".

In 2019, Timbers and Thorns ownership were in discussions with Portland mayor Ted Wheeler about replacing the artificial turf at Providence Park with real grass. A real grass field could make Providence Park more attractive for hosting international soccer matches. As of 2023, Providence Park is the only soccer-specific stadium in MLS that doesn't use real grass. It is also the only current or planned soccer-specific NWSL venue to use an artificial surface, and one of two NWSL venues, along with Seattle's Lumen Field, to use an artificial surface. The NWSL moved its neutral-site 2021 championship match from Portland to Lynn Family Stadium in Louisville, Kentucky, a grass venue, after players publicly complained about the artificial surface and early kickoff time.

== Current tenants ==
The stadium is currently home to the Portland Timbers of MLS, which the stadium has hosted in all of the club's iterations since 1975, and the Portland Thorns FC of NWSL since 2013.

=== Portland Timbers ===
The Portland Timbers hosted their first match at the stadium on May 2, 1975, against the Seattle Sounders. It was the first professional soccer match ever hosted at Providence Park. The club would get their first win just 5 days later on May 7, 1975, with Peter Withe scoring the first ever home Timbers goal in a 1–0 victory over Toronto Metros-Croatia. The Timbers were immediately successful at the stadium, only losing once during 1975 and setting the Timbers home attendance record of 33,503 in the NASL semifinals against the St. Louis Stars on August 17, 1975.

The team played at Providence Park (then called Civic Stadium) until 1982 before folding. However, they helped develop the soccer culture in Portland and the passionate fans at the park that still remain today.

The Portland Timbers were reborn in 1985, continuing to play at Civic Stadium. The club used the stadium during their time in the Western Soccer Alliance and the American Professional Soccer League until 1990.

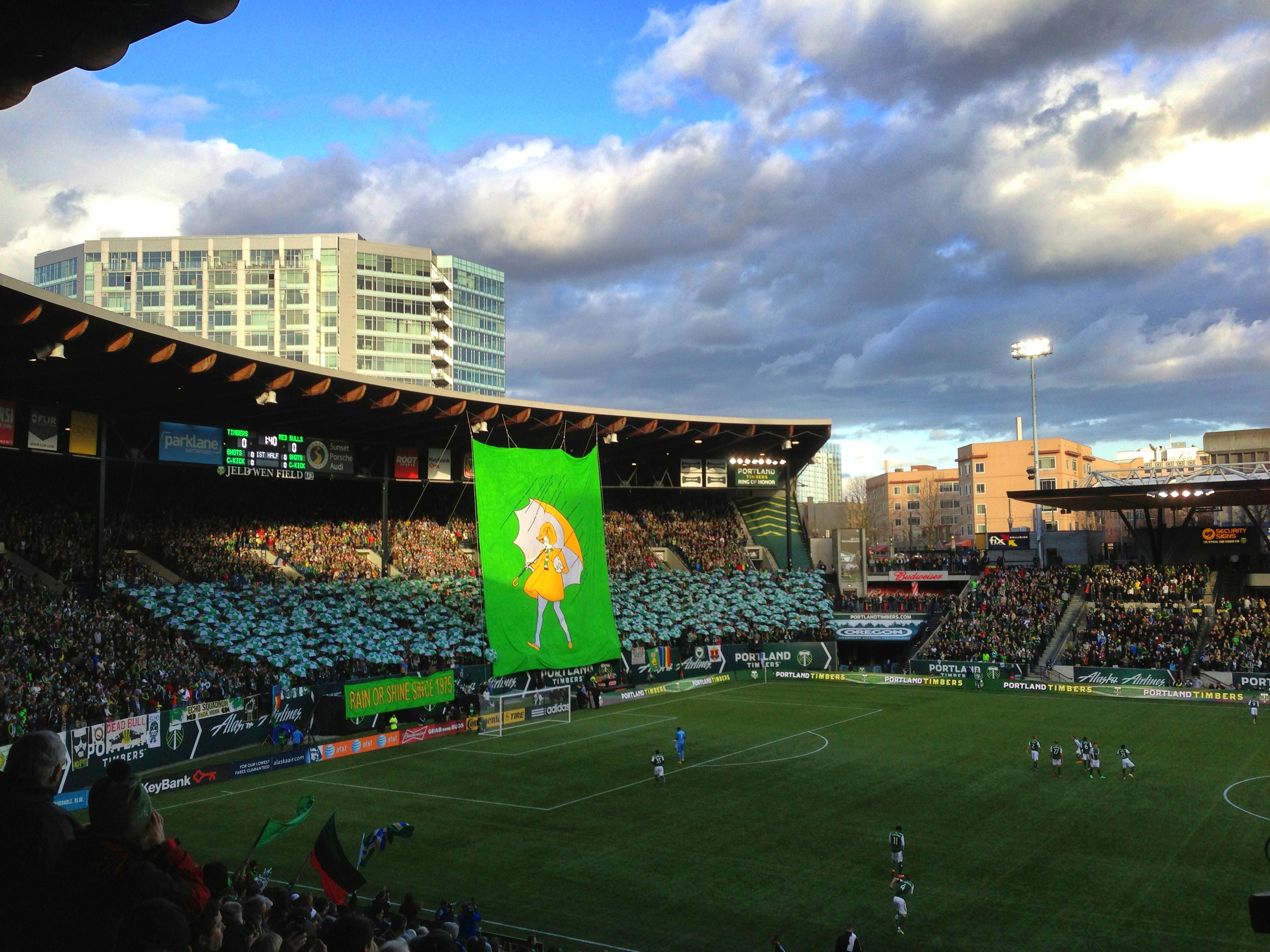
View of the stadium and supporters during a Timbers match in March 2013

A new Portland Timbers franchise was founded in 2001 and began to use the park again for its home games. The naming rights were sold to PGE and the stadium became known as PGE Park. A $38.5 million renovation was completed to allow for a more comfortable soccer experience. Around this time, the Timbers established themselves as one of the best-drawing teams in the A-League, averaging attendance above 5,000 in each of their four years of existence. As they moved to the USL, the club became more successful, going unbeaten at home in the 2007 regular season. In 2008, the club averaged 8,567 home fans, the second-highest in the USL First Division. In 2009, Portland was selected to become a Major League Soccer franchise, and in the same year the Timbers went unbeaten for a USL-record 24 matches in a row.

In 2011, the stadium was renovated to provide Portland with a premier location to watch the Timbers play in Major League Soccer as well as fit the standards required by the league. The $36 million renovation modernized the stadium, added a high-tech video board and added new seating and amenities. The park was renamed Jeld-Wen Field after Klamath Falls-based windows and doors company Jeld-Wen purchased the naming rights.

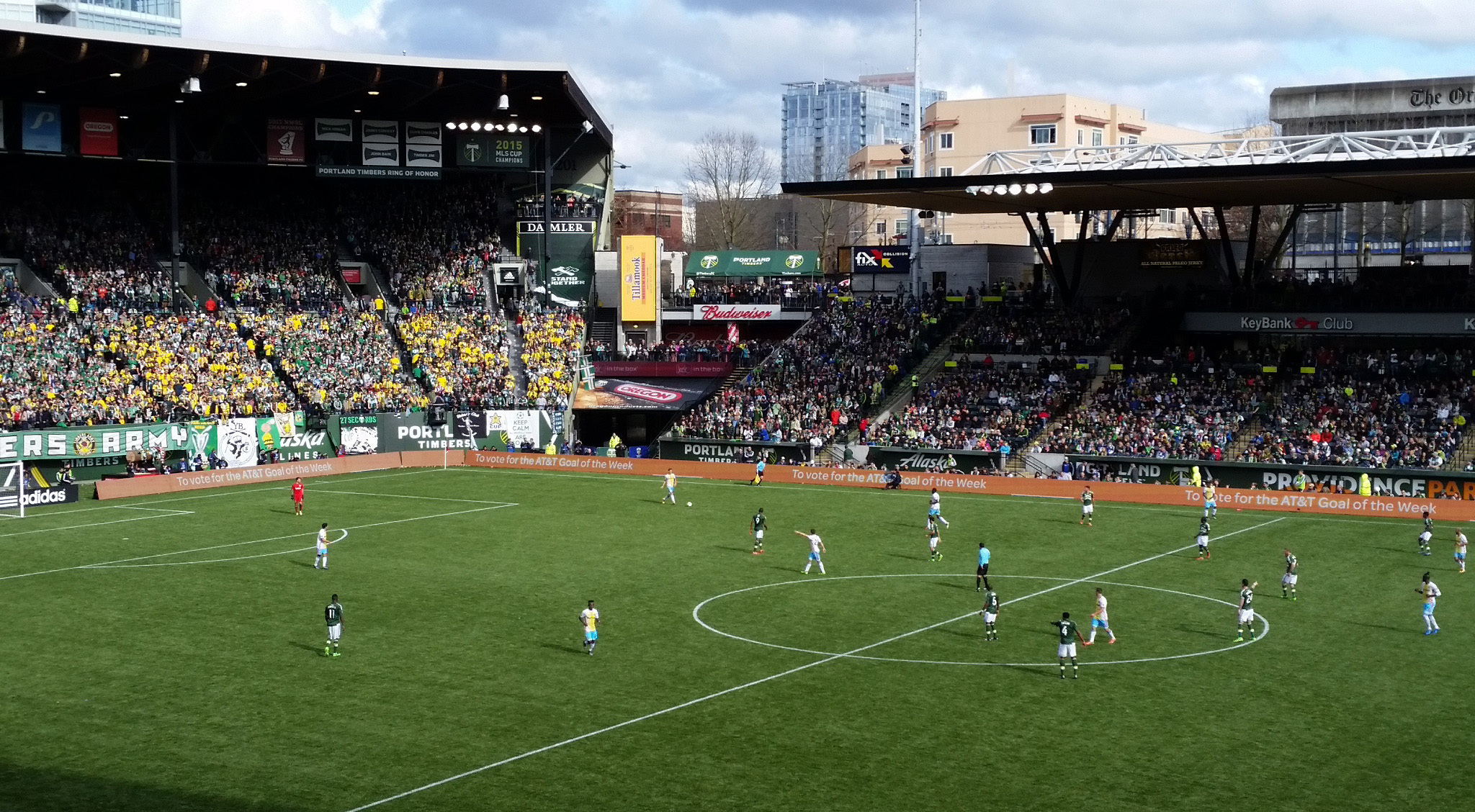
Portland Timbers v Columbus Crew match, March 2016

The stadium officially opened for Major League Soccer play on April 14, 2011, when the Timbers defeated the Chicago Fire, 4–2, before a sellout crowd of 18,627. This was the first time top-level American soccer had been played in the city of Portland since August 22, 1982.

Jeld-Wen Field was the site of the first Timbers playoff home game in their MLS history, defeating arch-rival Seattle 3–2 on November 2, 2013. This allowed the Timbers to win 5–3 on aggregate and clinch the two-game series, advancing to the Conference finals. In 2014, the stadium was renamed Providence Park after Providence Health & Services bought the naming rights. Home victories over the Vancouver Whitecaps and FC Dallas in the 2015 MLS Cup Playoffs provided a launch pad to the Timbers winning the 2015 MLS Cup. In 2018, Portland hosted two rounds of playoffs at Providence Park, rewarding the home support with crucial results as the Timbers defeated Seattle and Sporting Kansas City to advance to the MLS Cup Final. The Timbers defeated Minnesota United FC and Real Salt Lake in the 2021 MLS Cup Playoffs, which helped the Timbers advance to and host the 2021 MLS Cup Final, the first time Providence hosted the MLS championship game.

After the completion of the 2019 renovation, capacity at the park increased to 25,218. The Timbers played their first game at the park on July 1, 2019, against LAFC, selling out the expanded sections.

The Timbers have sold out every home game to date since their transition to MLS in 2011. Providence Park has been consistently cited as one of the best American soccer stadiums and as one of the best places to see Major League Soccer. MLS writer Charles Boehm described Timbers games at Providence Park "one of North American soccer's greatest spectacles" in 2019.

=== Portland Thorns FC ===
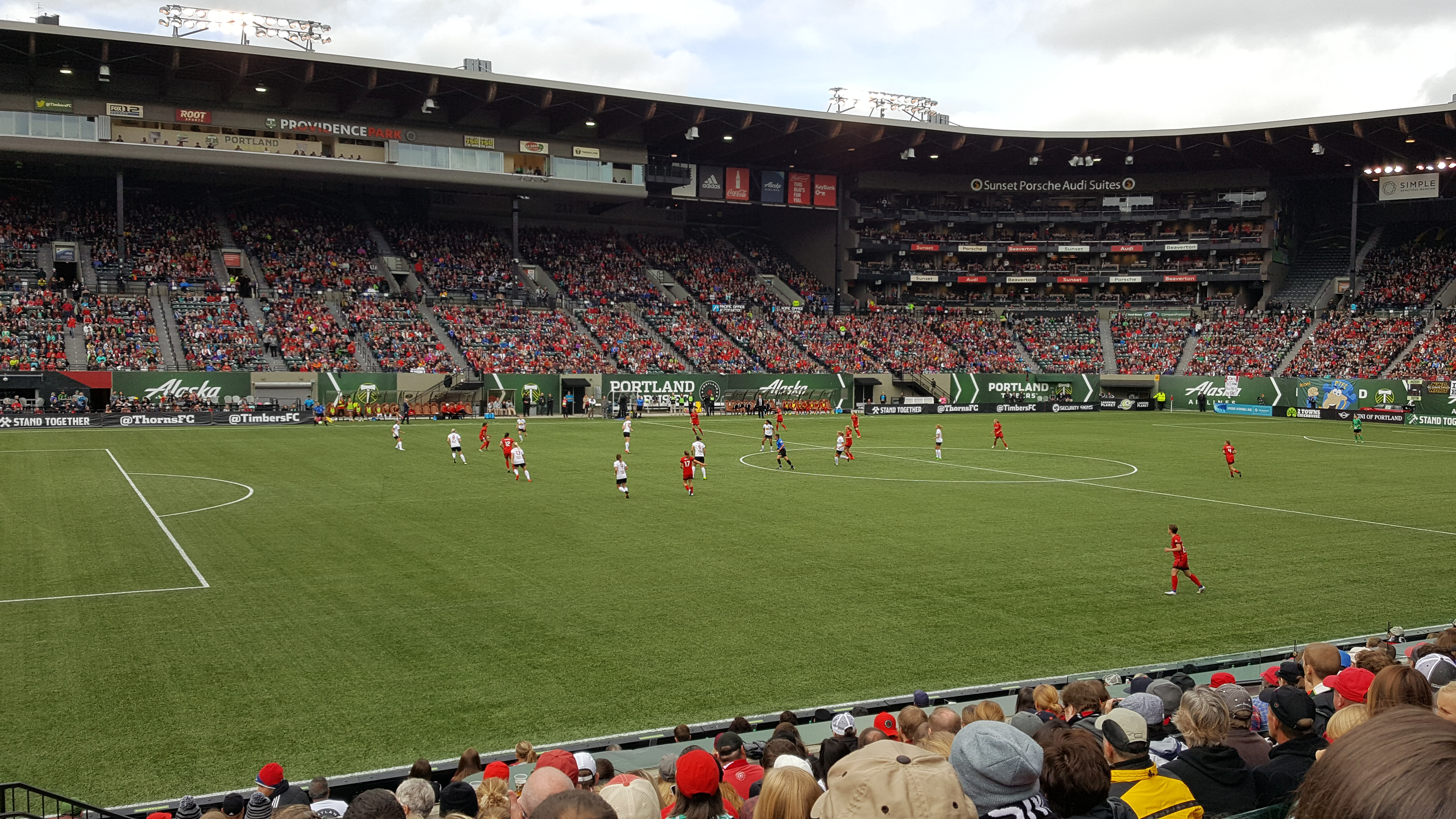
Portland Thorns match at Providence Park in 2016

The Thorns played their first season in the National Women's Soccer League in 2013, playing in Providence Park. The team's first home match on April 21 provided the club its first victory, a 2–1 win over Seattle Reign FC. In addition to setting a new league record for attendance, the opening day crowd of 16,479 was bigger than any single-game attendance from Women's Professional Soccer, the last women's national league before the NWSL.

Portland won the NWSL Championship in 2013 and 2017, using home victories in the playoffs to propel them to the titles. Providence Park also hosted the 2015 NWSL Championship Game, where FC Kansas City defeated Seattle Reign FC, 1–0, to win the championship. It also hosted the 2021 NWSL Championship, where Portland also won the championship against NJ/NY Gotham FC 6–5 on penalties, with both teams scoring 1–1 in regulation.

The Thorns have had the highest average attendance in the league in each of their first seven seasons, and set a league attendance record of 25,218 at an August 11, 2019 match against the North Carolina Courage.

== Former tenants ==
In 1933, pari-mutuel betting was legalized in Oregon, and by May 23 of that year the Multnomah Kennel Club hosted its first greyhound race on the stadium's new track. The Kennel Club maintained its headquarters at the stadium until 1956, when the track was removed.

The Portland Beavers minor league baseball team of the Pacific Coast League (PCL) had played some games at Multnomah Field during 1905 when their Vaughn Street Park was temporarily reconfigured to host a track and field event. They moved into Multnomah Stadium in 1956 after over a half century at Vaughn Street, a wooden ballpark which was soon demolished. The sod from the field at Vaughn Street was transferred to the new venue; Civic Stadium installed artificial turf in 1969.

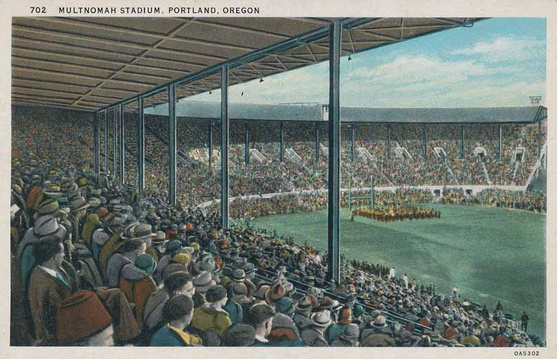
Before the city purchased the stadium, it was owned by the Multnomah Athletic Club

From 1973 to 1977 the independent Portland Mavericks of the Northwest League played their home games at the stadium. Actor Kurt Russell was an infielder for the Mavericks. The Beavers returned to Portland in 1978 until 1993 when they were moved out of the city again. The Class A Portland Rockies were established in 1995 and played at the park until 2000 when they were moved and renamed the Tri-City Dust Devils. In 2001, the Albuquerque Dukes were moved to Portland and renamed the "Beavers" marking the third time the franchise would occupy the park for their home games.

As a baseball venue, the stadium had an unorthodox south-southeast alignment, with home plate in the northwest corner (20th and Morrison) of the property.

After it was announced that Major League Soccer was moving a franchise to Providence Park (then known as PGE Park) the Beavers had to start looking for a new stadium. However, the plan never came to fruition and team owner Merritt Paulson put the Beavers up for sale. The club's major-league parent, the San Diego Padres, purchased the team, which moved to Tucson, Arizona as the Tucson Padres. The team played its final game at the stadium on September 6, 2010.

The stadium hosted the USFL's Portland Breakers, as well as the Portland Storm and Portland Thunder of the WFL.

Some Portland Interscholastic League football games were played at the stadium in at least 1974 & 1975.

Soccer has been hosted at Providence Park since the original Portland Timbers were founded in the original North American Soccer League in 1975. Various iterations of the team have called the stadium home, including the 1980s version in the Western Soccer Alliance and the 2000s version in the USL First Division before the MLS club was formed.

From 2008 to 2017, Providence Park was used as home for the Timbers U23s of the USL2, a development platform for the club. Following the 2017 season, the Portland U23s moved to Salem, OR.

During the last few months of the 2020 MLS season, Providence Park hosted home matches for Vancouver Whitecaps FC after COVID-19 cross-border restrictions imposed by the Canadian government prevented the team from playing matches in Canada.

== Events ==
=== Soccer ===
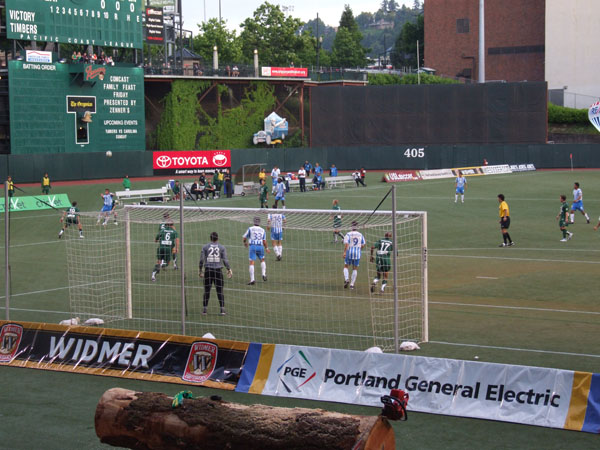
Soccer game in the USL years, viewing the old configuration of the East End

On August 28, 1977, the stadium was site of the North American Soccer League Soccer Bowl '77 between the New York Cosmos and the Seattle Sounders, the last official game of the legendary Pelé. The Cosmos won the championship.

On September 7, 1997, the stadium hosted a World Cup soccer qualifying match between the United States men's national team and Costa Rica. A crowd of 27,396 witnessed the U.S. squad win, 1–0, on a goal by Tab Ramos in the 79th minute. The crowd's cheering for the USMNT in Portland created an atmosphere that "took years for any other American city to match".

Providence Park has hosted the United States men's national team on 4 different occasions. Outside of tournament play in the 1998 World Cup qualifying and the 2013 Gold Cup, the stadium has hosted two friendlies: on April 4, 1985, against Canada (a 1–1 draw), and on May 28, 1998, against Kuwait (a 2–0 win).

The stadium was the site of four group matches in the 1999 Women's World Cup. The stadium also hosted two group matches, two quarterfinals, and both semifinals in the 2003 Women's World Cup.

Providence Park hosted the 2014 MLS All-Star Game.

On December 11, 2021, Providence Park hosted the 2021 MLS Cup after the Timbers won the Western Conference Final over Real Salt Lake and are the highest seed remaining. The stadium saw a total attendance of 25,218 spectators.

| Date | Winning Team | Result | Losing Team | Tournament | Spectators |
|---|---|---|---|---|---|
| August 28, 1977 | (United States) New York Cosmos | 2–1 | (United States) Seattle Sounders | Soccer Bowl '77 | 35,548 |
| April 4, 1985 | United States | 1–1 | Canada | International Friendly | 4,181 |
| September 7, 1997 | United States | 1–0 | Costa Rica | 1998 FIFA World Cup qualification (CONCACAF) | 27,396 |
| May 24, 1998 | United States | 2–0 | Kuwait | International Friendly | 25,343 |
| September 22, 2011 | United States women | 3–0 | Canada women | Women’s International Friendly | 18,570 |
| November 28, 2012 | United States women | 5–0 | Republic of Ireland women | Women’s International Friendly | 10,092 |
| July 9, 2013 | Costa Rica | 3–0 | Cuba | 2013 CONCACAF Gold Cup | 18,724 |
| July 9, 2013 | United States | 6–1 | Belize | 2013 CONCACAF Gold Cup | 18,724 |
| August 6, 2014 | (United States) (Canada) MLS All-Stars | 2–1 | (Germany) Bayern Munich | 2014 MLS All-Star Game | 21,733 |
| October 15, 2015 | (United States) FC Kansas City | 1–0 | (United States) Seattle Reign FC | 2015 NWSL Championship | 13,264 |
| September 22, 2018 | (United States) North Carolina Courage | 3–0 | (United States) Portland Thorns FC | 2018 NWSL Championship | 21,144 |
| December 11, 2021 | (United States) New York City FC | 1–1 (4–2 pen.) | (United States) Portland Timbers | 2021 MLS Cup | 25,218 |

==== 1999 FIFA Women's World Cup ====
| Date | Winning Team | Result | Losing Team | Tournament | Spectators |
|---|---|---|---|---|---|
| June 23, 1999 | Russia | 5–0 | Japan | Group C | 17,668 |
| June 23, 1999 | China | 7–0 | Ghana | Group D | 17,668 |
| June 24, 1999 | North Korea | 3–1 | Denmark | Group A | 20,129 |
| June 24, 1999 | Germany | 6–0 | Mexico | Group B | 20,129 |

==== 2003 FIFA Women's World Cup ====
| Date | Winning Team | Result | Losing Team | Tournament | Spectators |
|---|---|---|---|---|---|
| September 28, 2003 | Ghana | 2–1 | Australia | Group D | 19,132 |
| September 28, 2003 | China | 1–0 | Russia | Group D | 19,132 |
| October 2, 2003 | Germany | 7–1 | Russia | Quarterfinals | 20,012 |
| October 2, 2003 | Canada | 1–0 | China | Quarterfinals | 20,012 |
| October 5, 2003 | Germany | 3–0 | United States | Semifinals | 27,623 |
| October 5, 2003 | Sweden | 2–1 | Canada | Semifinals | 27,623 |

=== Football ===
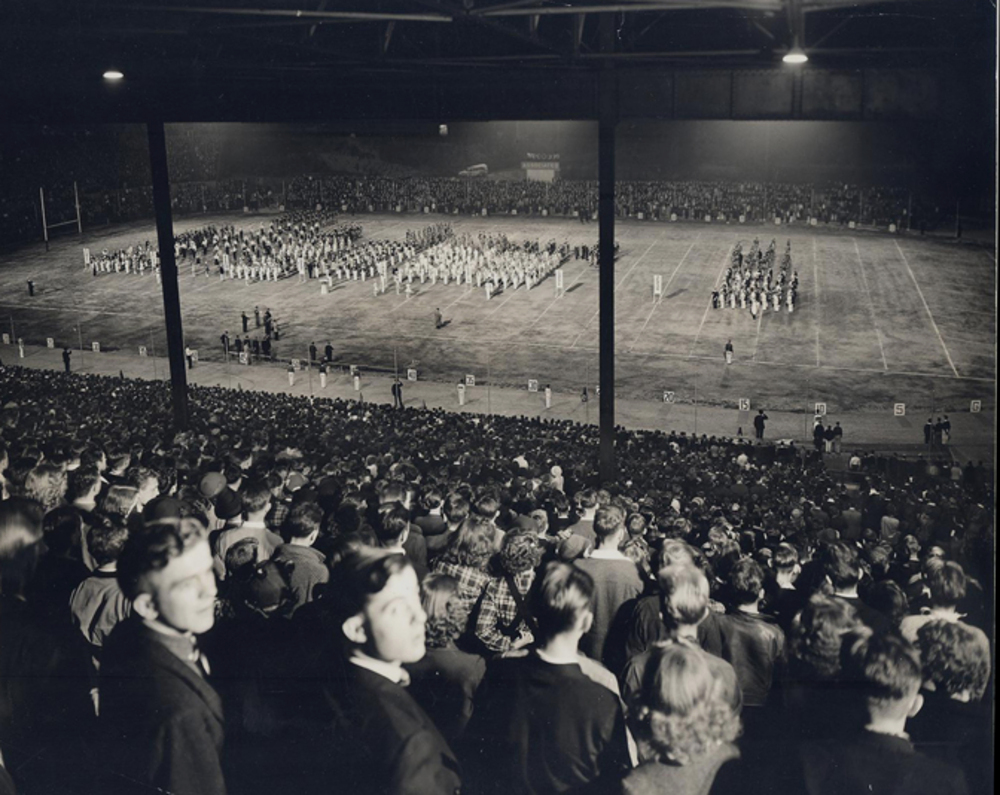
A night football game at Providence Park (then known as Multnomah Stadium) in the 1950s

Known as Multnomah Stadium at the time, the venue was formally dedicated on Oct. 9, 1926, as the University of Washington's football team beat the University of Oregon, 23–9, with more than 24,000 fans in attendance.

The Providence Park all-time college football attendance record was set on October 18, 1930 as 35,266 fans watched the Oregon Ducks defeat their rival the Washington Huskies by a score of 7–0.

On 7 different occasions the Oregon–Oregon State football rivalry game was held at Providence Park, with the last time being in 1952, where the Beavers beat the Ducks 22-19.

Both Oregon and Oregon State regularly played games, especially against nearby Washington, at Providence Park up until the 1960s and 1970s. At the time, the stadium could hold or draw more fans than the schools' home fields, so it was a logical space for high-stakes games. The Ducks last played in Providence on September 12, 1970, defeating the University of California 31-24. The Beavers played in Portland all the way up until 1986, with their last game until 2022 being a 49-0 blowout loss to #15 UCLA on November 1, 1986.

Providence Park, then known as Civic Stadium, was home to many generations of high-octane offense from the Portland State Vikings, including from 1975 to 1980 when Mouse Davis, the "godfather" of the run and shoot offense and Portland State Football Hall of Famer, was the head coach of PSU. While coaching at Civic, he led the PSU football program to a 42–24 record over six seasons while averaging 38 points and nearly 500 yards of offense per game. PSU led the nation in scoring three times. The unique passing game made stars out of Davis' two main quarterbacks, June Jones and Neil Lomax. In 1975, Jones threw for a Division II record 3,518 yards. Davis' next quarterback, Lomax, set NCAA records of 13,220 yards and 106 touchdowns in 42 games. Under Davis' direction, Portland State set 20 NCAA Division II offensive records in addition to the Vikings being named the NCAA's all-time point producers in 1980, scoring 541 points in 11 games for 49.2 points per game, along with 434.9 yards passing and 504.3 yards of total offense per game.

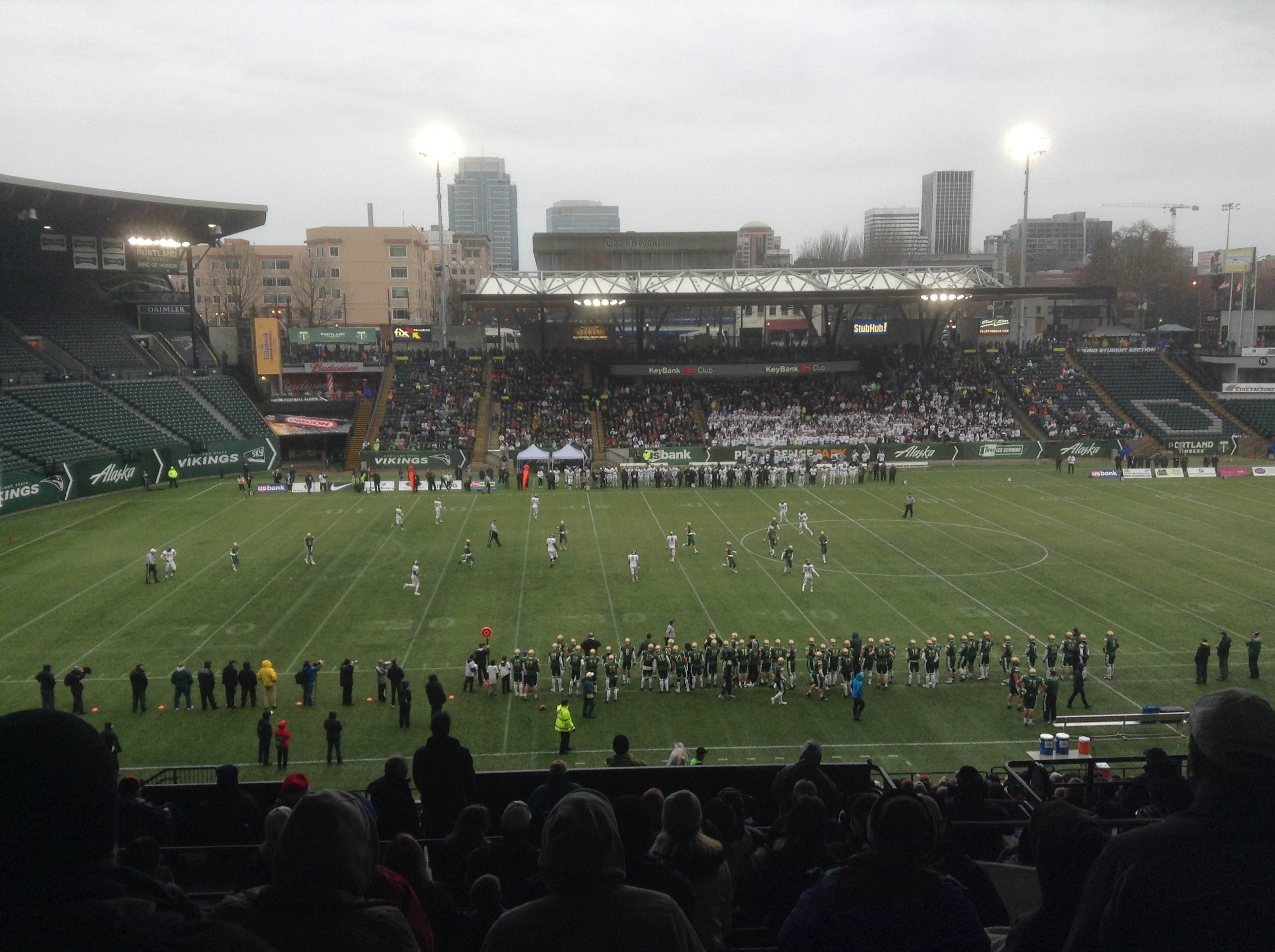
2015 Oregon High School State Football Championship between Jesuit High School and West Linn High School

During a November 9, 1980 game, Lomax threw for seven first-quarter touchdowns against Delaware State, which the Vikings won 105–0.

On June 25, 1992, Civic Stadium hosted a Canadian Football League exhibition game between the Toronto Argonauts and the Calgary Stampeders. At the time, the CFL was looking to scout out possible cities in the United States for expansion. A crowd of 15,362 was on hand to see Calgary win 20-1, with a Canadian rouge being scored by Toronto.

On October 27, 2007, the stadium hosted the highest-scoring game in modern NCAA football history, when the Weber State University Wildcats defeated the PSU Vikings, 73–68, a combined point total of 141 points. This point total eclipsed the previous NCAA record of 136 points, set in a 1968 Division III game, and the previous Division I record of 133 points, set in 2004. While this record lasted only two weeks, and has been surpassed four times in all, it remained the highest-scoring game involving NCAA Division I teams until 2018, when Texas A&M defeated LSU in a 74–72 seven-overtime game. Coincidentally, Mouse Davis was the offensive coordinator for Portland State at the time, returning to Providence Park under the head coaching of Jerry Glanville.

Oregon State played FCS Montana State in Providence Park on September 17, 2022, due to OSU's Reser Stadium being under construction. It was the first game in the stadium hosted by an FBS team since the Beavers last did it in 1986. The Beavers won the game 68–28.

=== Baseball ===
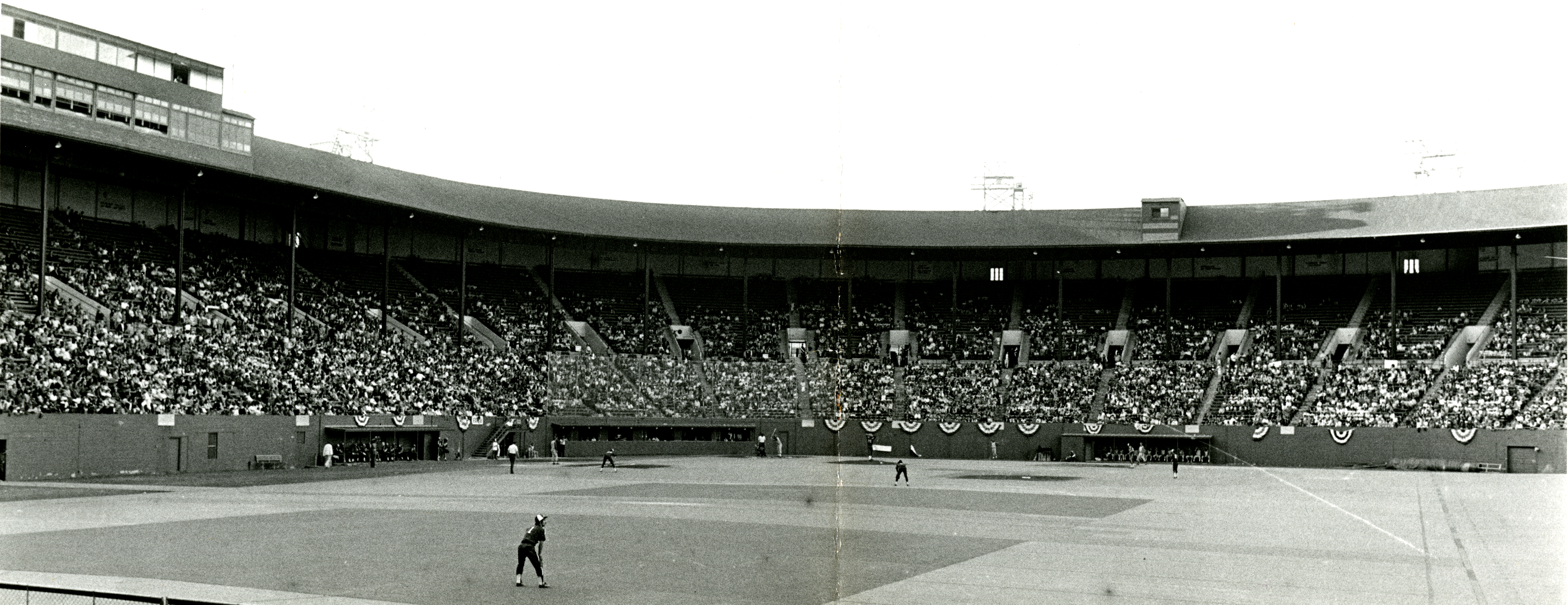
A baseball game in 1974

Given that the stadium's primary purposes originally were track and field, football, and dog racing, it had somewhat odd dimensions for baseball. Due to the curving northern stands, foul territory along the third base line was much larger than that along the first. This would have helped mitigate the short home run distance in left field.

Dimensions varied over the years somewhat. When first opened for the Beavers in 1956, the left field foul line was 305 feet (93 m), deep left center field 400 feet (120 m), center field 389 feet (119 m), deep right center field 412 feet (126 m), normal right center field 365 feet (111 m) and the right field line 335 feet (102 m).[Portland Oregonian, May 6, 1956, p.73]

During the 1970s, the Jantzen swim wear company had a 3D model of the Jantzen girl attached to the left field wall in its baseball configuration. The Jantzen girl was in play because it was below the top of the wall and it was hit a couple of times over the years. The Jantzen girl was removed from the outfield wall during renovations and is now on display in the concourse under the west stands.

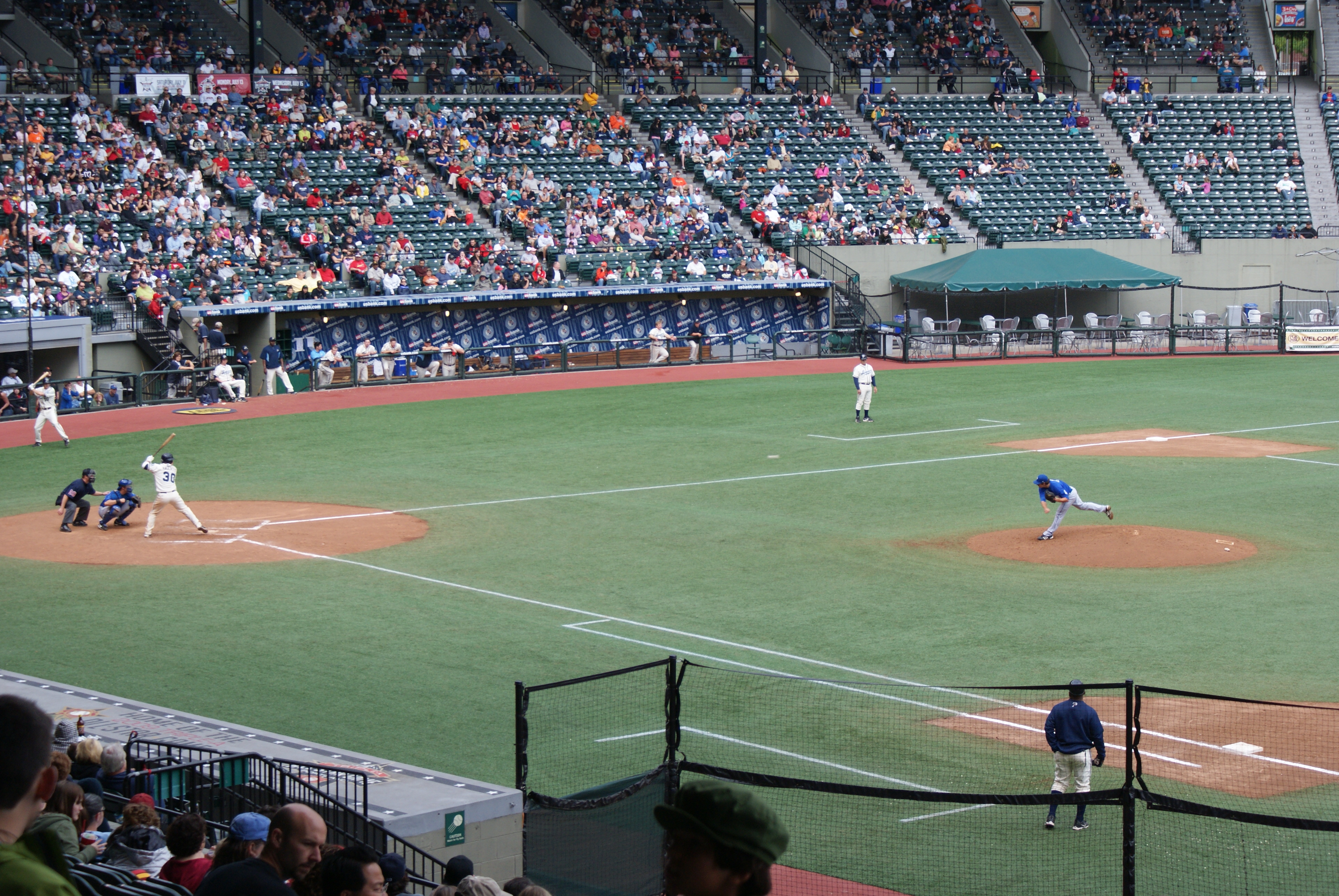
Portland Beavers baseball game in 2009

On May 27, 1991, the stadium received national attention when Vancouver Canadians outfielder Rodney McCray, while attempting to catch a fly ball, crashed through a wooden advertisement behind the warning track in right-center field; a real-life version of an incident in the fictional book and film, The Natural. While McCray failed to make the out, he only suffered scrapes and bruises and remained in the game. Highlight reels of that play ran for weeks on cable channels such as CNN and ESPN. On August 12, 2006, the Beavers commemorated the event with a Rodney McCray Bobblehead Night, passing out bobbleheads of McCray to fans and renaming right-center field "McCray Alley".

In the mid-1990s the stadium was planned to be the home of the yet-to-be named Portland team, a charter franchise of the United League (UL) which was planned to be a third league of Major League Baseball (MLB).

On July 15, 2009, the stadium hosted the Triple-A All-Star Game, with the International League stars defeating the Pacific Coast league, 6–5. The game was attended by 16,637 fans, the largest crowd for a Triple-A All-Star game since 1991, and the third largest at the time. Portland's Chad Huffman won the Home Run Derby.

=== Concerts ===
While on a four-day tour of the Pacific Northwest, September 2, 1957, Elvis Presley performed in one of the first three outdoor stadium rock concerts in music history. Presley had held the second ever in Vancouver, BC, Canada just a few days earlier, on September 1, 1957, at Empire Stadium, his first being at the Cotton Bowl, in Dallas, TX, on 11 October 1956. The concert created mass hysteria and an estimated 14,600 people attended the concert.

In a November 8, 2013 interview with the Portland Business Journal, Portland Timbers owner Merritt Paulson expressed his desire to host summer concerts at the stadium.

| Date | Artist | Opening act(s) | Tour / Concert name | Attendance | Notes | Revenue |
|---|---|---|---|---|---|---|
| September 2, 1957 | Elvis Presley | - | - | — | — | |
| June 13–14, 1970 | Big Brother and the Holding Company | - | - | — | — | |
| July 28, 1984 | The Beach Boys | - | - | — | — | |
| June 2, 1985 | Jimmy Buffett | - | Sleepless Knights Tour | — | — | |
| July 29, 1986 | Bob Dylan & Tom Petty | - | True Confessions Tour | — | — | |
| August 30, 1986 | The Monkees | - | 20th Anniversary Tour | — | — | |
| August 14, 1987 | David Bowie | - | Glass Spider Tour | — | — | |
| August 21, 1992 | Jimmy Buffett | - | Recession Recess | — | — | |
| September 25, 1992 | Johnny Cash | - | - | — | — | |
| July 5, 1994 | James Taylor | - | - | — | — | |
| September 4, 1994 | Spin Doctors | Cracker and Gin Blossoms | - | — | — | |
| April 4, 1995 | Sarah McLachlan | - | - | — | — | |
| July 1, 1995 | Village People | - | - | — | — | |
| September 15, 1995 | Van Halen | Brother Cain | The Balance "Ambulance" Tour | — | — | |
| July 14. 1996 | Crosby, Stills & Nash | Chicago | - | — | — | |
| June 19, 1998 | Sinéad O'Connor | - | - | — | Lilith Fair | |
| June 19, 1998 | K's Choice | - | - | — | Lilith Fair | |
| June 19, 1998 | Sarah McLachlan | - | - | — | Lilith Fair | |
| June 19, 1998 | Erykah Badu | - | - | — | Lilith Fair | |
| June 19, 1998 | Indigo Girls | - | - | — | Lilith Fair | |
| June 19, 1998 | Natalie Merchant | - | - | — | Lilith Fair | |
| June 19, 1998 | Billie Myers | - | - | — | Lilith Fair | |
| July 11, 1999 | Beth Orton | - | - | — | Lilith Fair | |
| July 11, 1999 | Luscious Jackson | - | - | — | Lilith Fair | |
| July 11, 1999 | Bijou Phillips | - | - | — | Lilith Fair | |
| July 11, 1999 | Sandra Bernhard | - | - | — | Lilith Fair | |
| July 11, 1999 | Mýa | - | - | — | Lilith Fair | |
| July 11, 1999 | Sarah McLachlan | - | - | — | Lilith Fair | |
| July 11, 1999 | Sixpence None the Richer | - | - | — | Lilith Fair | |
| July 11, 1999 | Sheryl Crow | - | - | — | Lilith Fair | |
| July 11, 1999 | Liz Phair | - | - | — | Lilith Fair | |
| June 1, 2005 | Def Leppard | Bryan Adams | Rock 'N Roll Double Header Tour | — | — | |
| June 7, 2005 | Joan Jett | - | - | — | — | |
| August 16, 2024 | Foo Fighters | Pretenders; Alex G | Everything or Nothing at All Tour | | | |
| September 25, 2024 | Green Day; The Smashing Pumpkins | Rancid; The Linda Lindas | The Saviors Tour | | | |
| June 28, 2025 | Post Malone Jelly Roll | | Big Ass Stadium Tour | | | |

== Art and design ==
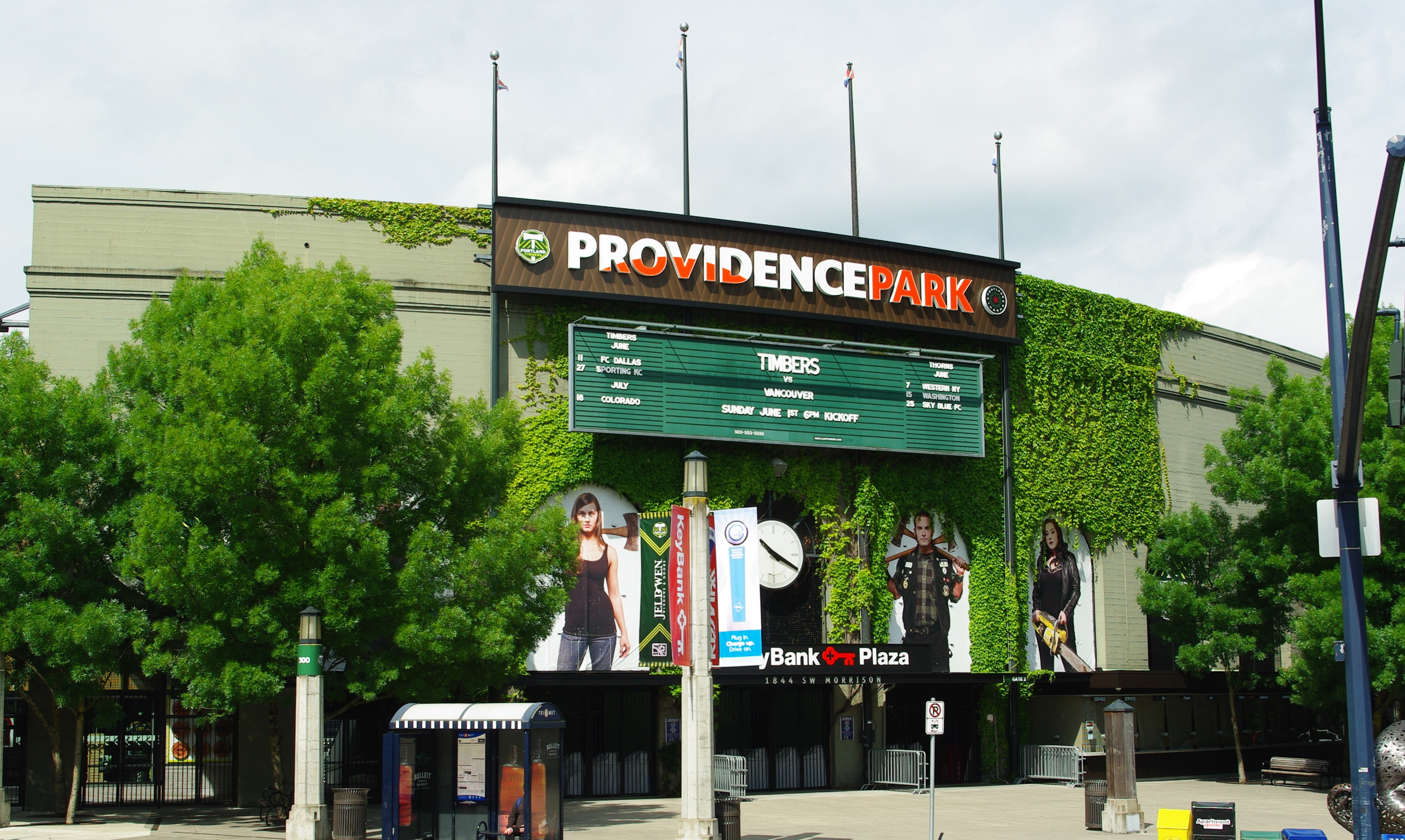
Main entrance with stadium as Providence Park

Providence Park's outside walls are covered with naturally-grown ivy. The entrance billboard used to announce dates and future games is a deliberate retro replica of the old scoreboard that used to be in the same location.

Multiple art installations and sculptures line the outside plazas of Providence Park. Those include Facing the Crowd, a series of two bronze sculptures, and You Are Here, an artistic rendition of a 12-foot wide log ring with historical artifacts of Portland's past embedded inside.

== In popular culture ==
In 2010, Providence Park was a filming location of Season 2 of the television series Leverage. The episode depicts a fictional Massachusetts (where the series was set) minor league team also known as the Beavers.

The IFC show Portlandia references Providence Park multiple times throughout the series and the lead characters Peter (Fred Armisen) and Nance (Carrie Brownstein) attend a Timbers match in a 2012 episode, bringing along a home-made sign to root for the club.

Providence Park was added to the stadium rotation in the FIFA video game series for the first time in September 2020, beginning with FIFA 21. Providence became the sixth Major League Soccer stadium added to the game, and the addition allowed for the access of all three Cascadia clubs' home stadiums for the first time. The Thorns' inclusion in FIFA 23 also made Providence Park one of four NWSL venues featured in the game.

== Feral cat colony ==
Since approximately 1985, the field has been home to a feral cat colony, which may have been at the park before the current stadium opened in 1926. There are an estimated 12–19 cats in the colony, referred to as "living rat traps". After a construction worker killed a feral cat in 2000, the park enlisted the Feral Cat Coalition of Oregon to assist the animals during construction efforts and to run a trap-neuter-return program. The cats are discussed in Chuck Palahniuk's travelogue of Portland, Fugitives and Refugees.

== Gallery ==
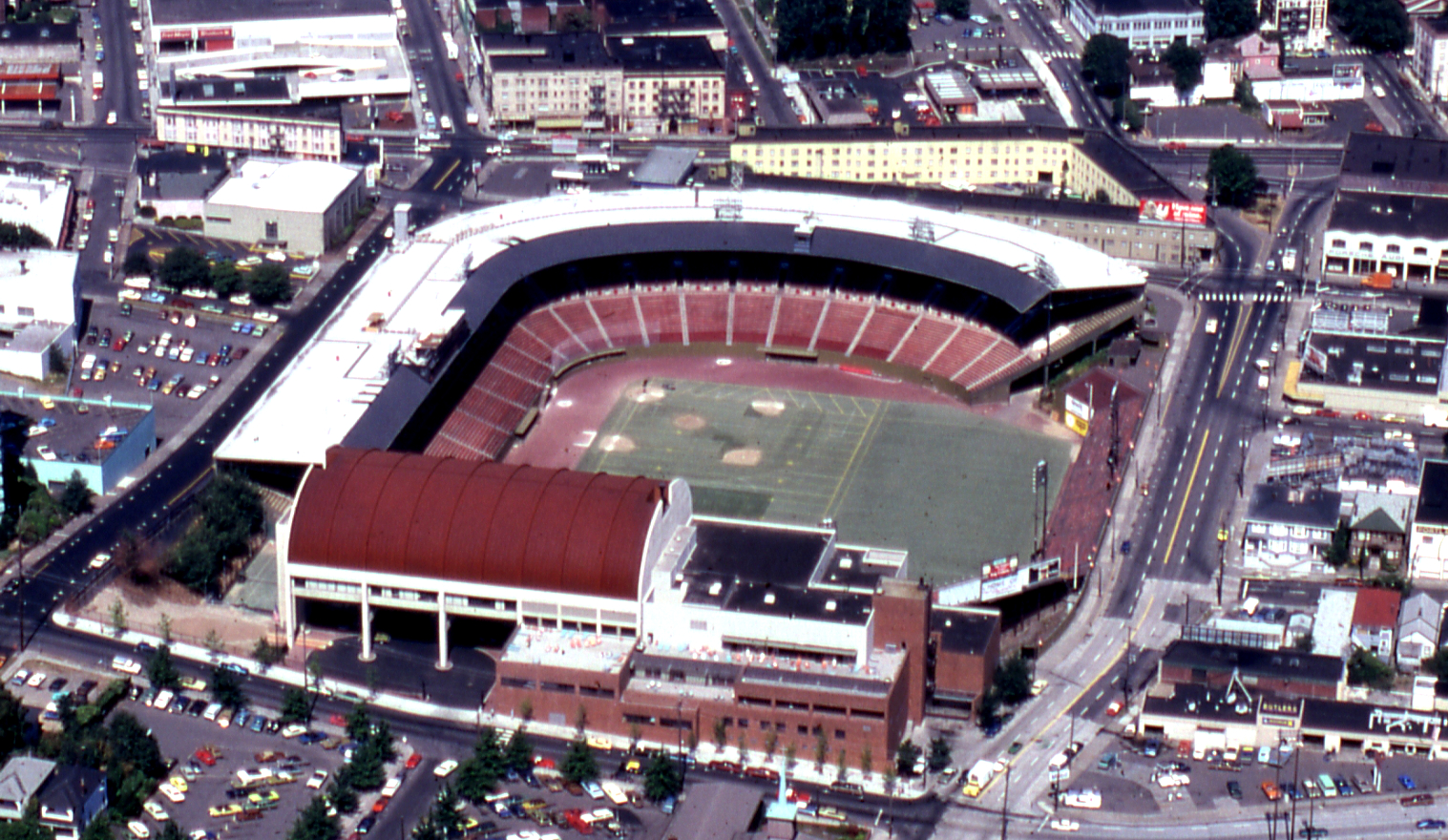
An aerial view of the stadium in 1974

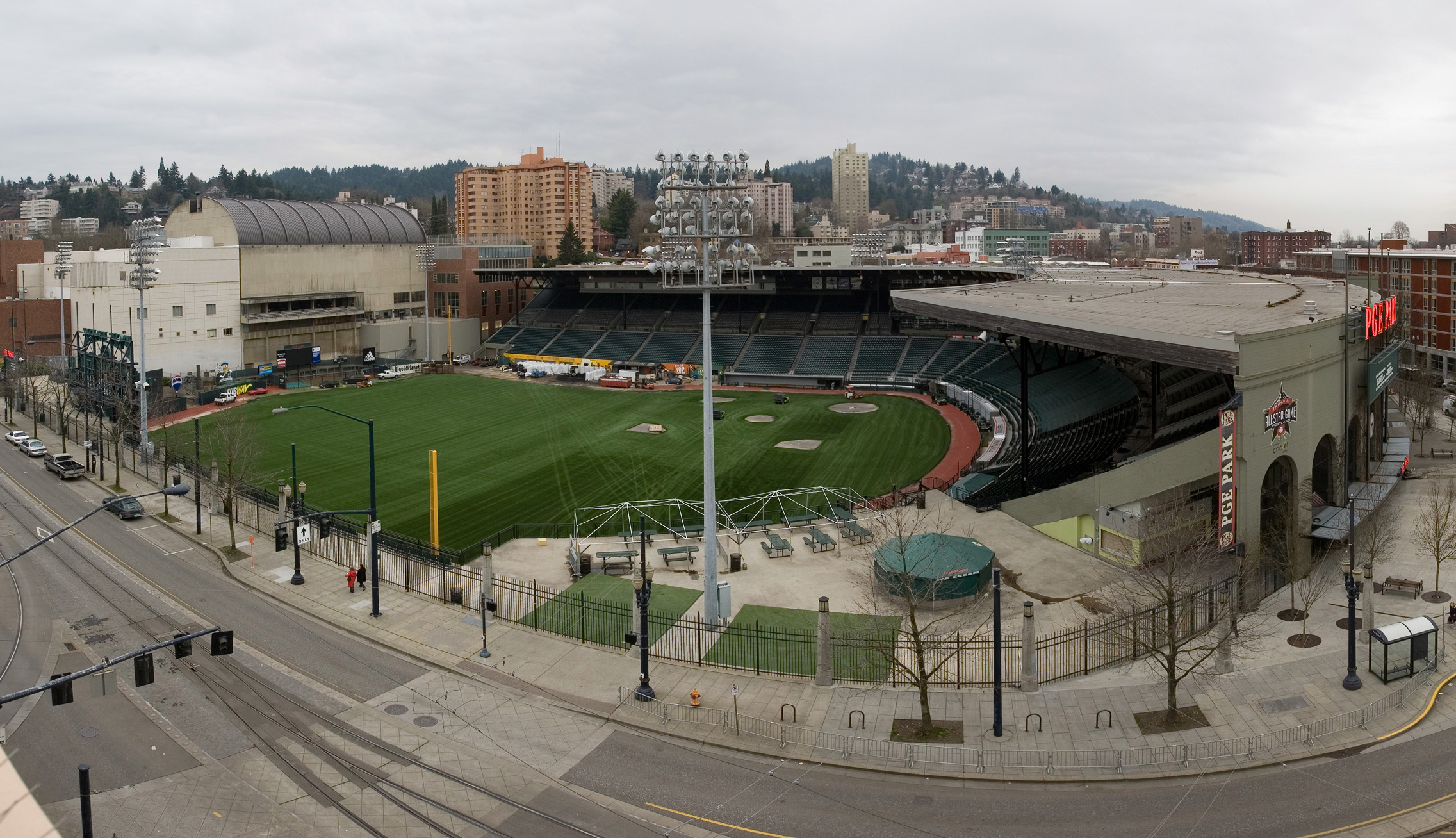
PGE Park, 2008

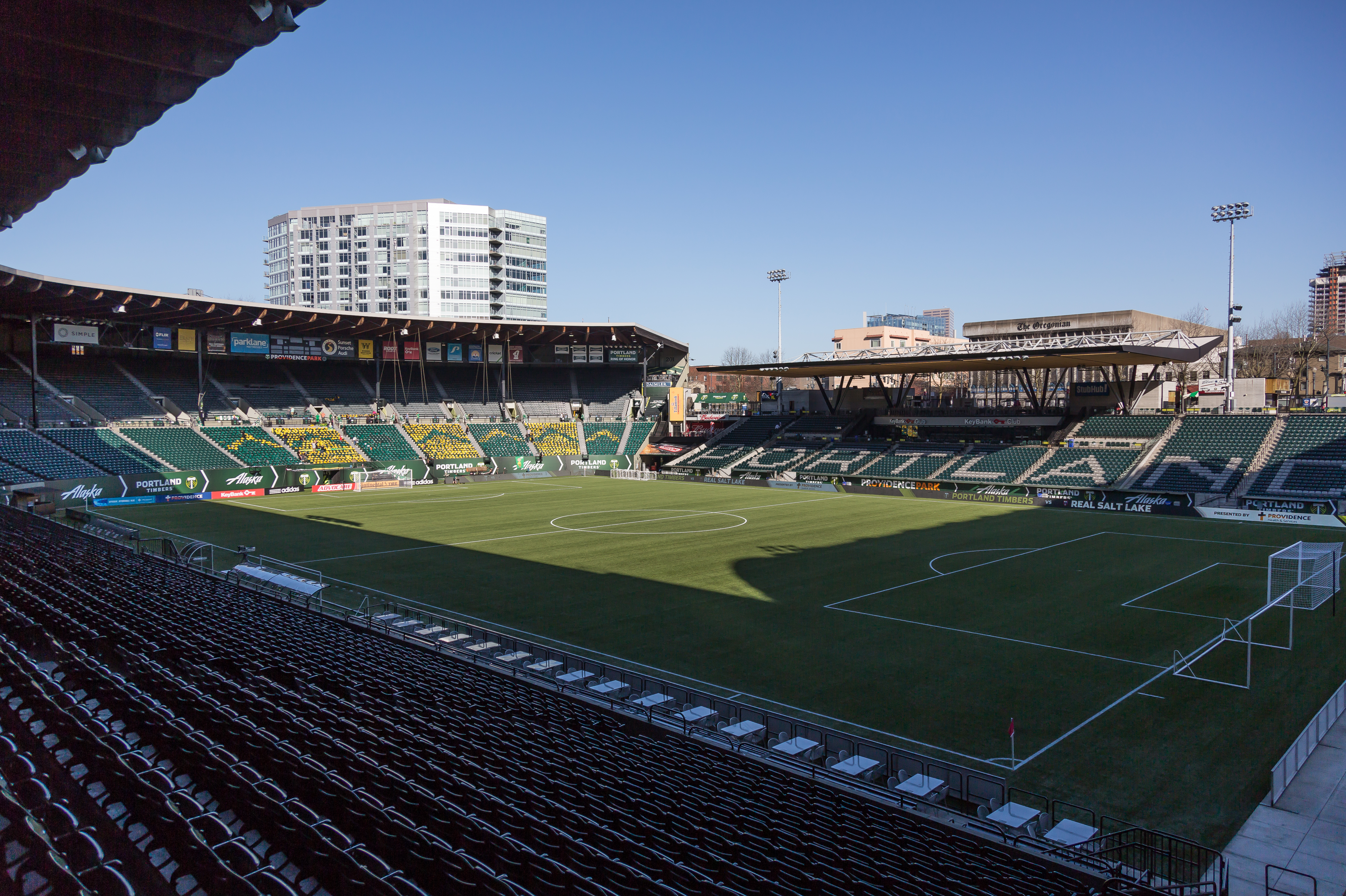
Interior view, 2015

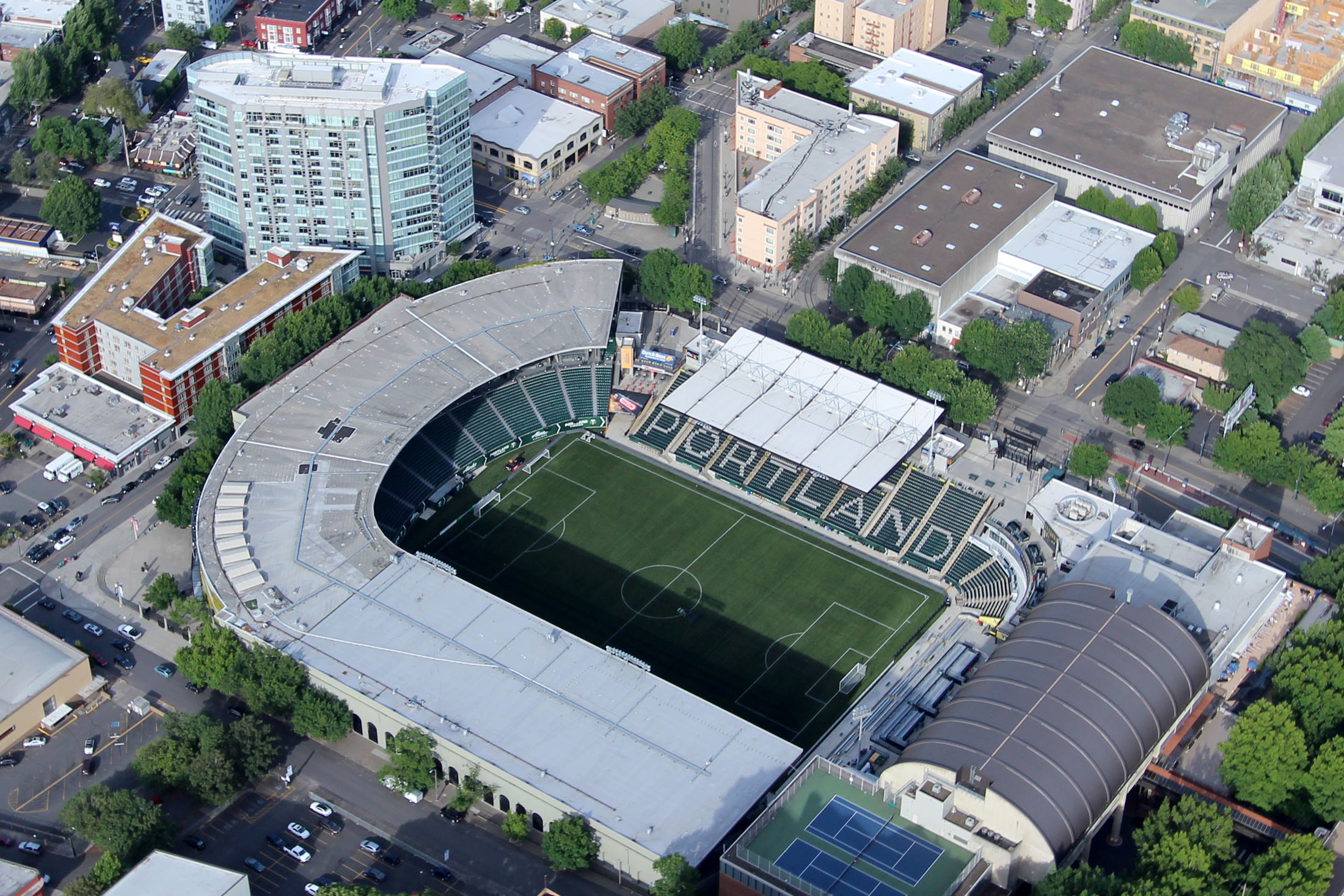
The stadium in 2016

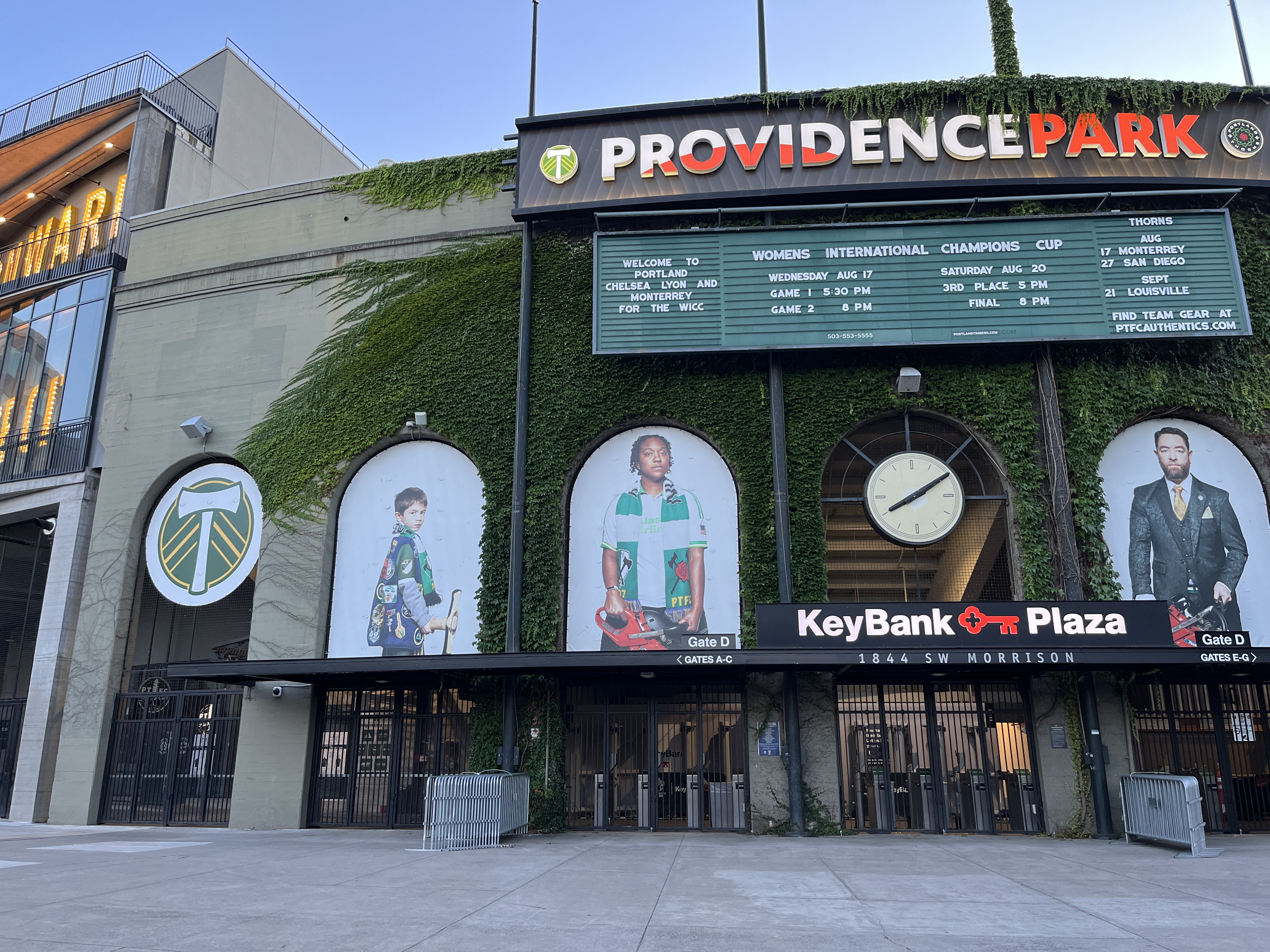
Gate D entrance, 2022

== See also ==
- List of sports venues in Portland, Oregon
- Architecture of Portland, Oregon
- List of Major League Soccer stadiums
- List of National Women's Soccer League stadiums
- Soccer-specific stadium
- Portland Beavers Ballpark, a proposed stadium in 2010
- Vaughn Street Park, a now-demolished baseball park
