= Oregon Ducks football venues =

Sports venues in Oregon

Football teams at the University of Oregon have played home games at six sites since the team was founded in 1894, five in Eugene and one in Portland. Oregon has not had an on-campus football stadium since 1966.

== Athletic Field (1894) ==
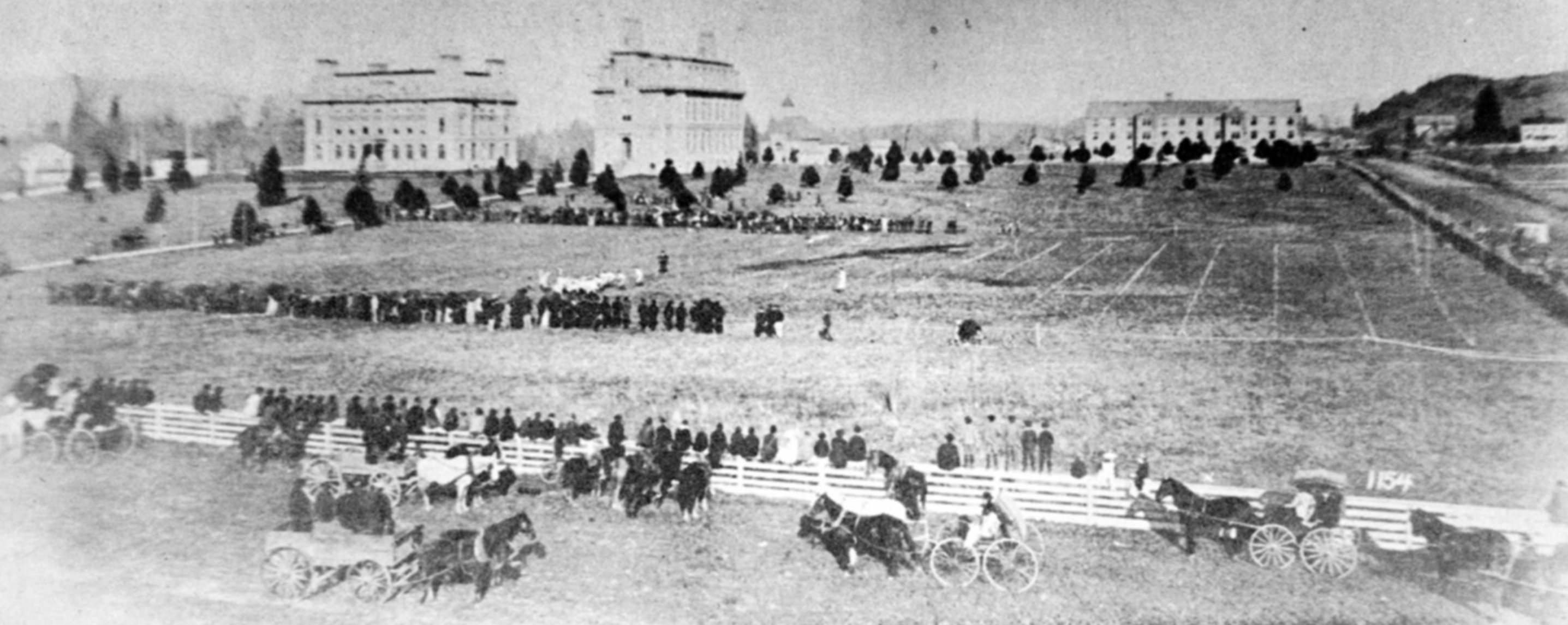
First Oregon football game, on Athletic Field, 1894

Record: 1 win, 0 losses, 0 ties

Early in the university's history, athletic events of all types were played on an open field on the west side of the Oregon campus square. The "athletic field" was located to the southwest of Deady and Villard Halls, at approximately the location of the current Lillis Business Complex, roughly at the northeast corner of 13th Avenue and Kincaid Street.

Oregon's first football game, a 44–2 victory over Albany College, was played on this field in March 1894.

The early football grounds at Oregon were notoriously muddy during poor weather conditions. Herman Rabe, a member of the first Oregon football team in 1894, recalled years later that players of the era didn't bother with uniforms because they would have to be thrown away afterwards; players would have to wash their hair several times after a game, just to get the mud out (no helmets were worn in those years).

== Stewart's Field (1894) ==
Record: 0 wins, 0 losses, 1 tie

Oregon's second home game of 1894, a 0–0 tie with Pacific College, was played at Stewart's Track, a racing facility at the end of Willamette Street in Eugene, that hosted horse and mule races and the occasional track meet. In May 1894, the Oregon baseball team began playing games there, and the field was set up for football in late November for the Pacific contest on Thanksgiving Day. The game was relocated from the Athletic Field used for the first game, because the lack of fences at Athletic made it impossible to charge admission; Stewart's Field was completely fenced.

== Kincaid Field (1895–1918) ==
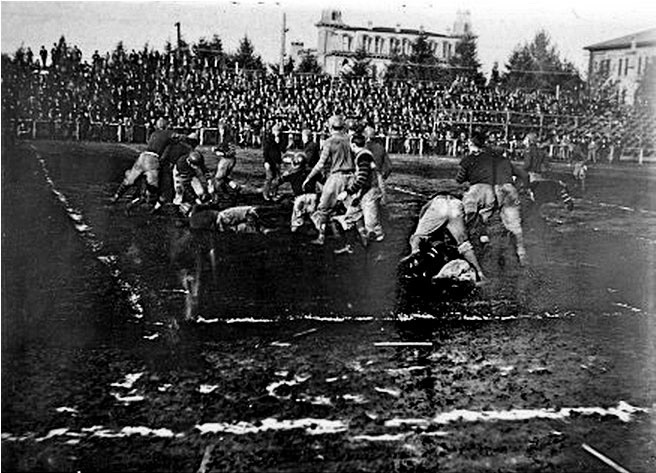
A typically muddy 1907 game at Kincaid Field.

Record: 47 wins, 9 losses, 4 ties

Kincaid Field was constructed for the 1895 season on a former wheat field bordering 13th Avenue, just east of the old Athletic Field on what is now the Memorial Quadrangle. The university had leased the rights to use the field and make necessary improvements from Harrison Kincaid, a local pioneer and newspaper publisher, who spent two terms as Oregon's Secretary of State.

Unlike the wide-open Athletic Field, Kincaid Field was eventually fully fenced, allowing something resembling controlled access at a campus site for the first time. An alumni fundraising campaign was organized, and $1000 was spent to construct grandstands at Kincaid.

As had its predecessor, Kincaid Field suffered from chronically poor drainage. Workers constantly battled the elements to provide a field suitable for play; at least one football was lost in the mud during a game. Oregon Agricultural College's student news reporter described Kincaid during the 1915 game as "a cross between a duck pond and a hog wallow"; the Eugene Guard's correspondent said "The field was a sea of mud, not deep, but wet and slippery. Rain fell throughout every minute of the game, and time and again every player was standing to his ankles in water."

In a classic 1916 game against Washington, a scoreless tie resulted from the ball being so slick with mud that it was impossible to hold; Oregon fumbled 11 times and Washington fumbled 12.

Kincaid Field was used for Oregon home games until 1919, when the bleachers at Hayward Field were completed.

== Hayward Field (1919–1966) ==
Record: 98 wins, 35 losses, 10 ties

Hayward Field circa late 1930s

The multi-purpose facility known as Hayward Field became Oregon's campus game site in 1919.

With the same drainage issues as its previous two gridirons, Hayward's playing field was constructed of packed sawdust, as was the field at Oregon State in Corvallis. In 1937 the sawdust at Hayward was replaced with grass. However, the drainage problems continued, and Hayward would forever be known as a miserable bog when games were played under rainy conditions.

Unlike the opponents typically faced in Portland, Oregon's games in Eugene were often against teams that provided more reasonable competition. Among coaches at Hayward, only Richard L. Smith, in his return to coaching for one season at Oregon in 1925, had a losing record at his home venue. Prink Callison had a 14–1 record at Hayward Field, the lone loss coming in the last game he coached, against Oregon State in 1937. That loss also broke a nine-year undefeated string at Hayward that stretched back to 1928.

By the 1960s, even with various remodelings and expansions through the years, it could accommodate just 23,500 fans, the smallest stadium in the conference. While nearly every seat was protected from the elements, it had little else going for it. It had not been built up to code, and as a result could not be expanded to the 40,000-seat capacity thought necessary to play the entire home slate on campus. Due to these factors, most of Oregon's conference opponents preferred to play in Portland. USC never played a game in Eugene at Hayward Field; Washington only played one, in 1924. California only played in Eugene twice, in 1917 and 1957. Stanford and UCLA only appeared six times each at Hayward. Conversely, Oregon State, Washington State, Idaho and Montana made regular appearances in Eugene.

The Ducks played their last home game at Hayward Field on November 5, 1966, suffering a narrow loss to Washington State.

After the football team moved to Autzen Stadium, Hayward Field was converted to a full-time track and field facility, which it remains to this day.

== Multnomah Field (1894–1925) / Multnomah Stadium (1926–1970) ==
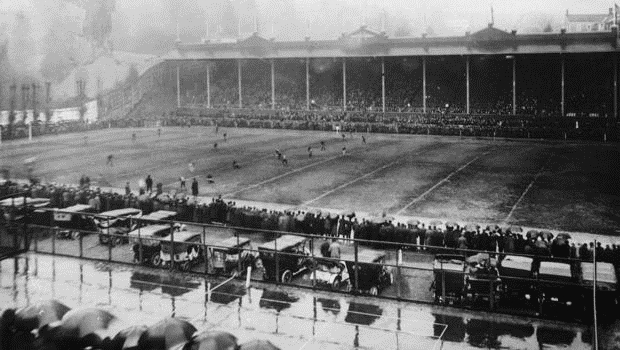
Multnomah Stadium, 1926, UO vs Washington

Record: 44 wins, 60 losses, 3 ties

Oregon's third football game, against Portland University in 1894, was the team's first appearance in Portland, at Multnomah Field. Over the years Oregon regularly played up to three home games each season in Portland at Multnomah Field and later Multnomah Stadium, at the same site, also called Portland Civic Stadium and now known as Providence Park. With its larger capacity and proximity to Portland's lodging and transportation hubs, the "big games" each year would be scheduled for Portland to ensure a sufficient gate for the visiting team. Between 1926 and 1966, each Oregon "home" game against Washington was played at Multnomah; USC never played a game in Eugene until Autzen Stadium was constructed.

Since most of the home games played in Portland were against the more established programs of the conference and top intersectional opponents, Oregon was usually an underdog in these games, a fact reflected in the win–loss record at Multnomah Stadium. Oregon's last home game in Portland was a 31–24 victory over California, on September 12, 1970. It was the first win by the Ducks over a conference team from California in ten years.

== Autzen Stadium (1967–present) ==
Record: 178 wins, 93 losses, 5 ties

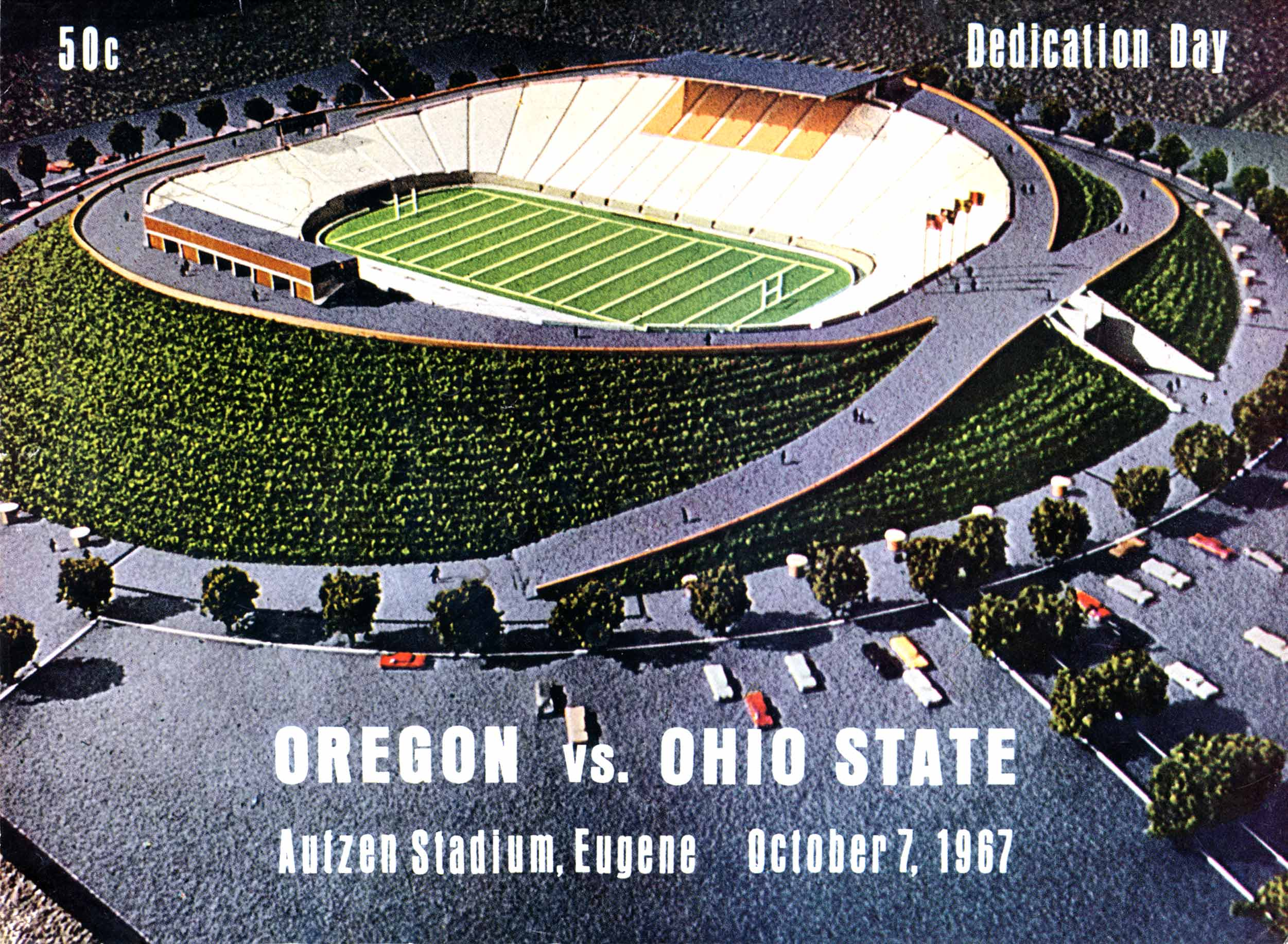
Autzen Stadium, 1967 program cover

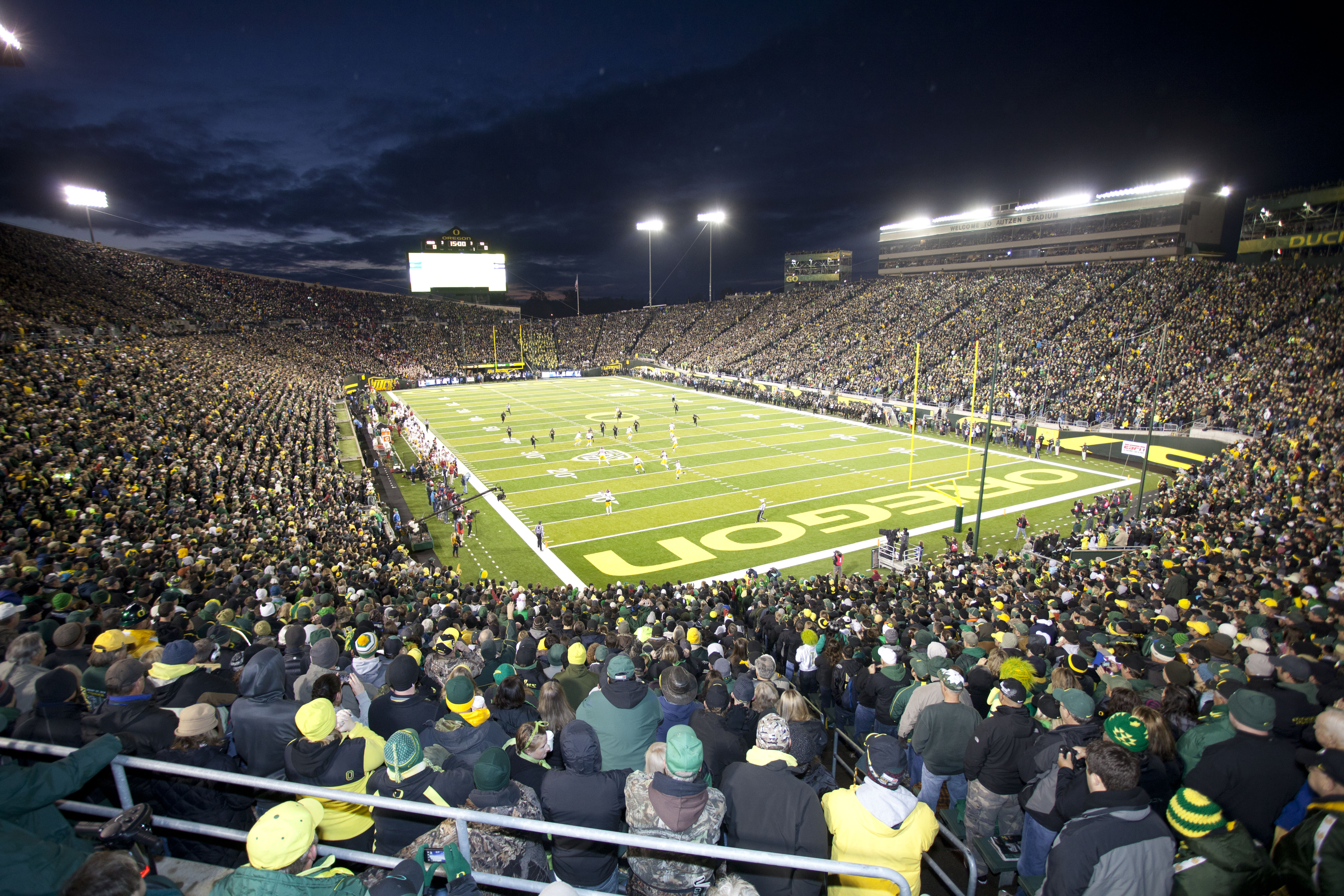
Autzen Stadium, 2011

The need for a larger stadium in Eugene was recognized by UO Athletic Director Leo Harris in the late 1950s, and Harris persuaded Oregon's administration to purchase property in Eugene's North Bank Park, about a mile north of the campus, for construction of a stadium. Autzen Stadium was completed in 1967. The field at Autzen was constructed to support natural grass, but the field surface stood below ground level, and Autzen had many of the same drainage issues as its predecessors. The grass was replaced with artificial turf in 1969.

With its expanded capacity of over 41,000, there was no longer a need to play home contests in Portland to meet visitors' gate requirements.

Autzen Stadium was expanded to 54,000 seats in 2002. It is now the centerpiece of an Oregon sports campus that also features the athletic department offices (Casanova Center), the Hatfield-Dowlin Football Complex, the Ed Moshofsky Sports Facility, the PK Park baseball stadium, a soccer pitch (Pape Field), and several practice fields.
