= Facing the Crowd =

Pair of sculptures in Portland, Oregon, U.S.

- Sculpture at the intersection of 18th Avenue and Morrison Street, depicting a smiling boy
- Artist: Michael Stutz
- Year: 2001
- Type: Sculpture
- Medium: Bronze
- Subject: Two faces (man and boy)
- Dimensions: 2.4 m × 2.5 m × 1.7 m (94 in × 99 in × 67 in)
- Location: Portland, Oregon, United States; 45°31′20″N 122°41′26″W 45°31′22″N 122°41′32″W
- Owner: City of Portland

Facing the Crowd is a series of two outdoor sculptures by American artist Michael Stutz, located outside of Providence Park in Portland, Oregon, in the United States. Composed of silicon bronze, the sculptures depict faces of a laughing man and a smiling boy. They were funded by the City of Portland's Percent for Art program and were installed in 2001, during a major remodel of the outdoor sports venue then known as PGE Park.

== Description ==
Sculpture on Southwest 20th, depicting a laughing man

The sculptures, which depict the faces of a man and a boy, are located at 18th and 20th Avenues at Morrison Street in Portland's Goose Hollow neighborhood. Designed by Michael Stutz, they were installed in 2001 during the nearly $40 million remodel of PGE Park, the outdoor sports venue now known as Providence Park. Funding was provided by the City of Portland's Percent for Art program. The faces are made of welded silicon bronze and are each approximately 8 feet (2.4 m) tall. Similar in appearance, the one at KeyBank Plaza on 18th Avenue depicts a smiling boy, while the one at the intersection of 20th and Morrison depicts a laughing man.

Stutz said of Facing the Crowd: "The heartily smiling man and boy faces portray two stages in the life of an individual, relating to the historical evolution and changing character of the site itself." He has also said that the work's "dynamic presence becomes a celebration of joy and playfulness. [His] hope is that these giant totems engage the spectator with their simple and universal theme of maintaining humor in the midst of chaotic urban world."

== See also ==
- 2001 in art
- You Are Here (2012), another sculpture installed at Providence Park
