= South Central, Salem, Oregon =

Neighborhood in Salem, Oregon

Coordinates: 44.922363°N 123.037477°W

South Central is a neighborhood in Salem, Oregon, United States, located just south of downtown. Major neighborhood features include Bush's Pasture Park, the Asahel Bush House and Museum, Deepwood Estate, Gaiety Hill-Bush's Pasture Park Historic District, South Salem High School, and Mahonia Hall, the official residence of the governor of Oregon.

As of June 2025, two city councilors represent South Central: Linda Nishioka (Ward 2), and Vanessa Nordyke (Ward 7). The neighborhood is located in Salem Police District 8.

== See also ==
- Lansing, Salem, Oregon
- North Lancaster, Salem, Oregon
- Northgate, Salem, Oregon
- Sunnyslope, Salem, Oregon
- West Salem, Salem, Oregon
