= Northgate, Salem, Oregon =

Neighborhood in Salem, Oregon, United States of America

Coordinates: 44.986°N 123.003°W

Northgate is a neighborhood in Salem, Oregon, United States, located in the far north part of the city. It is one of Salem's larger districts and much of it is industrial rather than residential. Northgate has a neighborhood association, one of the nineteen such groups in Salem.

The area is roughly bounded by Hazelgreen Road and Chemawa Road to the north, parts of Cordon Road, Portland Road and Interstate 5 on the east, Silverton Road on the south, and Salem Parkway and Cherry Avenue on the west.

Northgate is next to the city of Keizer, unincorporated sections of Salem, and the Salem neighborhoods of Lansing, Highland, and North Lancaster.

== History ==
Northgate has long been a hub for regional commerce and transportation. Portland Road is part of Oregon Route 99E, a major north–south route that predates Interstate 5. Salem's two main rail lines also pass through Northgate: the Union Pacific and the Portland and Western Railroad (formerly Burlington Northern and Oregon Electric Railway respectively).

Northgate is one of the older neighborhoods in Salem.

== Parks and recreation ==
Northgate Park is a four-acre city park. In 2009, a local man was shot to death in the park, and in his memory the community is building a Peace Garden, which will include a community garden and meditation area.

The neighborhood is home to the Kroc Center, a multi-use facility built by a donation from the late Mrs. Ray Kroc to the Salvation Army.

== Schools ==
Schools in Northgate include the Bureau of Indian Affairs' Chemawa Indian School, and the Salem-Keizer School District schools Stephens Middle School, Hallman Elementary School, Hammond Elementary School, and Yoshikai Elementary School. Northgate-area public school students attend McKay High School in the North Lancaster neighborhood.
