= Sprague High School =

Public school in Salem, Oregon, United States

Charles A. Sprague High School
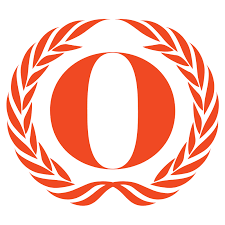

Location
- 2373 Kuebler Road S Salem, (Marion County), Oregon 97302; United States; 44.886988°N 123.077743°W

Information
- Type: Public
- Opened: 1972
- School district: Salem-Keizer School District
- Principal: Patrick Dutcher
- Teaching staff: 72.08 (FTE)
- Enrollment: 1,765 (2023–2024)
- Student to teacher ratio: 24.49
- Colors: Olympic orange and white
- Athletics conference: OSAA Central Valley Conference 6A-6
- Mascot: Olympian
- Team name: Olympians
- Rival: South Salem High School
- Newspaper: The Oracle
- Feeder schools: Crossler Middle School, Judson Middle School
- Website: sprague.salkeiz.k12.or.us

Charles A. Sprague High School, known as Sprague High School (SHS), is a high school in the Sunnyslope neighborhood of Salem, Oregon, United States. The school is named after Charles A. Sprague, who served as Oregon's governor from 1939 to 1943.

== Academics ==
In the 2017–18 school year, 87.9% of Sprague's seniors received a high school diploma, compared to a statewide rate of 77%. Of 365 students, 321 graduated and 30 dropped out.

In the 2017–18 school year, Sprague's test scores were significantly higher than the state averages. In English, Sprague had 84% of students meeting state standards compared to the 70% state average, 46% in math compared to 33% statewide, and 81% in science compared to the 54% state average.

The racial makeup of Sprague currently consists of 74% white, 11% Hispanic, 15% other.

== Music activities ==
=== Grammy Signature School recognition ===
Sprague has been recognized as a Grammy Signature School in many years. This program is designed to honor exceptional public high school music programs across the country.

- 2009: GRAMMY Signature Schools
- 2008: GRAMMY Signature Schools
- 2000: National GRAMMY Signature School
- 1999: GRAMMY Signature Schools Gold

=== Orchestra ===
Since the orchestral program was created in 1986, Sprague's Camerata Orchestra and Symphony Orchestra have won a combined 25 Oregon School Activities Association (OSAA) State Championships, and the program flourished under the direction of Steve A. Nelson. In addition, Sprague is the only high school in Oregon to have won state championships in all four OSAA music categories (String Orchestra, Full Orchestra, Choir, and Band) in a single year (1998). Beginning in 1989, and every fourth year until 2005 (1993, 1997, 2001, 2005), Sprague's Orchestra Program has traveled to Austria, where the Camerata has been named the "Top High School String Orchestra in the World" on multiple occasions after winning the Vienna Youth and Music Festival in 1993, 1997, and 2005. The orchestras are currently directed by Lisa Rael.

- State Championships:
- Full Orchestra: 1988, 1996–99, 2001–03, 2006, 2011
- String Orchestra: 1990, 1993, 1995–2000, 2002, 2004–06, 2009–11

=== Choir ===
Choir director Russ Christensen was named the Oregon Music Educator of the year for 2007. The choir placed or tied for first in OSAA state choir championships in 1998, 2003, 2004, 2005, 2006, 2007, 2009, 2012, and 2017. The choir is now directed by Dr. Robert David Brown.

=== Concert Band ===
Sprague band has participated in many Heritage Festivals in Anaheim and San Francisco, California over the years. Below is list of the accomplishments by participation year:

Year	Event	Band	Ranking
2008	Heritage Festivals, Anaheim	Wind Ensemble	Gold 1st
2008	Heritage Festivals, Anaheim	Wind Symphony	Silver
2001	Heritage Festivals, Anaheim	Wind Ensemble	Gold 1st
2001	Heritage Festivals, Anaheim	Symphonic Band	Silver 1st
2001	Heritage Festivals, San Francisco	Jazz Band I	Gold 1st
2000	Heritage Festivals, San Francisco	Jazz Band	Gold 1st
2000	Heritage Festivals, San Francisco	Jazz Band	Gold 2nd
2000	Heritage Festivals, San Francisco	Wind Ensemble	Gold 1st
2000	Heritage Festivals, San Francisco	Concert Band	Gold 1st

==== Marching band ====
The first two months of each school year is marching band season. To start the season off, two weeks in August are spent on marching band camp. Members of Sprague Band assemble with the Color Guard practice drills, straighten lines and create a show for competition with other high school marching bands within Oregon, Washington, California, and Idaho. Most are members of the Northwest Association of Performing Artists.

Year	Event	Class rank	Class captions	Event rank	Event captions
2018	U of O Festival of Bands	3rd in AA	-	10th	-
2013	Pride of the Northwest	1st in A	High General Effect; High Visual; High Auxiliary	1st	High Music; High Visual; High Auxiliary
2013	McKenzie Classic	2nd in A	High General Effect	8th	-
2013	Southridge Spectacle of Sound	2nd in A	-	12th	-
2012	U of O Festival of Bands	3rd in A	High Music	10th	-
2012	Century Showcase	1st in A	High General Effect; High Music; High Visual; High Auxiliary	10th	-
2011	U of O Festival of Bands	3rd in A	-	13th	-
2011	Century Showcase	2nd in A	-	5th	-
2010	U of O Festival of Bands (Championships)	7th in A	-	-	-
2010	Pride of the Northwest	2nd in A	High Music; High Auxiliary	7th	-
2010	Pacific Coast Invitational	1st in A	High Music; High Auxiliary	5th	-
2009	OSU Marching Band Competition (Championships)	1st in A Note: West Salem 1st in AA; South Salem 1st in AAA; Southridge 1st in Open	High Music; High Auxiliary	9th	-
2009	Pride of the Northwest	1st in A	High General Effect; High Music; High Visual; High Auxiliary	2nd	High Auxiliary
2008	U of O Festival of Bands (Championships)	2nd in A			
2008	OSU Marching Band Competition	1st in A	High General Effect		
2008	McKenzie Classic	2nd in A	High Music		
2007	OSU Marching Band Competition (Championships)	2nd in AA	High General Effect		
2007	Puget Sound Festival of Bands	1st in AA	High General Effect; High Music; High Visual; High Percussion; High Auxiliary	4th	
2007	Sunset Classic	2nd in AA	High Music; High Auxiliary	3rd	High Music
2006	Pride of the Northwest	2nd in AA	High Music		
2005	U of O Festival of Bands			7th	
2005	Sunset Classic	1st in AA	High General Effect; High Music; High Visual; High Auxiliary	3rd	High Music
2004	U of O Festival of Bands (Championships)	1st in A			
2004	Sunset Classic	1st in A	High General Effect; High Music; High Auxiliary		

== Athletics ==
Sprague now competes in the 6A Central Valley Conference, re-established in 2022. The other teams in the conference are also from Salem and Keizer: McNary, North Salem, South Salem, West Salem.

During the 2004-2005 school year, Sprague won both the football and baseball state championships, marking the first time since 1998 that a major Oregon high school was a state champion in two of the "Big 3" (football, basketball, and baseball) in the same year. Between 2006 and 2009, the boys' tennis team won the team state championship and had a player in the singles final in three out of four years (2006, 2007, 2009).

The school has 7 state and 6 national titles, along with numerous individual player titles. The team swept the state championship in 2018, 2019, 2020, and 2022. They have been in the top 2 high school racquetball teams for over a decade.

State championships

- Football: 2004
- Boys' tennis: 1977, 1993, 1997, 2006, 2007, 2009
- Baseball: 1995, 2005
- Softball: 2003
- Racquetball: 1998, 2008, 2017, 2018, 2019, 2020, 2022 (club sport)

National champions

- Racquetball: 1998, 2008, 2009, 2011, 2013, 2019, 2020 (club sport)

State championship appearances

- Boys Cross Country: 1972, 1980, 1984, 1989–91, 1999-2000, 2004, 2022
- Girls Cross Country: 1978–81, 1986–87, 1989, 1992, 1996–97, 2007, 2015–17
- Volleyball: 2018
- Girls Basketball: 1989
- Boys Basketball: 1989, 1996–97
- Boys Swimming: 1974–78, 1986, 1990–95, 2002–03, 2007–08, 2011, 2015, 2017–18
- Girls Swimming: 1976–78, 1985, 1990–97, 1999-2000, 2002–15, 2017–18
- Wrestling: 1979-82, 1984–85, 1988, 1991–18
- Baseball: 1995, 2005
- Boys Golf: 1976, 1979–80, 1992–93, 1999–2003, 2007–08, 2011–12
- Girls Golf: 2000–01, 2007, 2012–14, 2018
- Softball: 1989, 1992, 1994, 2003, 2005
- Boys Tennis: 1974–79, 1982–83, 1985, 1988–18
- Girls Tennis: 1977, 1980–85, 1988, 1990–92, 1994, 1996–98, 2004–14, 2018
- Boys Track and Field: 1974–76, 1978–82, 1984–85, 1989–94, 1997, 2000–12, 2014–17
- Girls Track and Field: 1975–77, 1979–83, 1986, 1988–89, 1992, 1995–98, 2001–04, 2007, 2010–14, 2017

== Notable alumni ==
- Bill Swancutt, NFL football player
- Joey Wong, baseball player
