= David Gene Lewis =

Author and activist (born 1965)

- Born: 1965 (age 60–61); Heidelberg, Germany
- Citizenship: American; Confederated Tribes of the Grand Ronde Community of Oregon
- Education: Santa Rosa Junior College: Associate of Arts; University of Oregon: Bachelor of Arts; Master of Arts; Doctorate in Anthropology
- Website: liberalarts.oregonstate.edu/directory/david-lewis

David Gene Lewis (born 1965) is a Native American writer and editor, and an enrolled member of the Confederated Tribes of the Grand Ronde Community of Oregon. He researches information about the Kalapuya from archives in universities, historical societies, and government agencies, and writes about indigenous tribes, specializing in those of Oregon's Willamette Valley. Since 2022, he has held a faculty appointment in anthropology and ethnic studies at Oregon State University.

== Early life and education ==
David Gene Lewis was born in 1965 in Heidelberg, Germany, the son of Viet Nam era soldier Gary Wayne Lewis, and Polly Katherine (née Cox) Lewis. He married Donna Marie Ralstin, and they have two adult sons, Saghaley and Inaty.

Lewis attended Swegle Elementary School and McKay High School, both in Salem, Oregon. He completed an Associate of Arts degree at Santa Rosa Junior College in 1993, and earned a Bachelor of Arts in humanities (1997) as well as both a Master's (2000) and also a Ph.D. (2009) in anthropology at the University of Oregon. His dissertation, Termination of the confederated tribes of the Grand Ronde community of Oregon: Politics, community, identity, was advised by Lynn Stephen.

== Career ==
David Lewis has an established career as a writer and historian, publishing dozens of entries on The Oregon Encyclopedia, more than 500 posts about historical topics on his blog, The Quartux Journal, as well as research articles in literary journals, on diverse topics such as Oregon tribal histories, historical fire regimes, and forest management.

"So much of history is written by non-native people," said Lewis. "I have a responsibility to get it right as much as possible. I'm getting the information out in a public forum so that everybody has access to it. There needs to be accurate sources that we can use to teach kids and other people about the history."

When his son Saghaley's fourth-grade class at Salem's Swegle Elementary School "was making models of Oregon Trail-type wagons", Lewis pointed out, "This is inappropriate for him as an Indian. Why not do something more appropriate for his culture?" Lewis, as the manager of the Tribe's Cultural Resources Department, encouraged his son to make a canoe instead: "He's presenting a different story of history and culture to his class... Everybody's of one mind with pioneers and wagons; Natives used canoes. Why can't we (as Natives) feature that history? In public education today, there is not enough emphasis on Native culture." According to the news report,

When the day came for students to wheel around their covered wagons, Saghaley wheeled the canoe around the school. "Saghaley's project did stand out," said Lewis, "and he was asked many questions by other students. We hope this opened up some possibilities for the students that they will explore later in their lives."

The Oregon Encyclopedia describes his work as an author while he served on its editorial board: "DAVID G. LEWIS is a member of the Confederated Tribes of Grand Ronde, a descendant of the Takelma, Chinook, Molalla, and Santiam Kalapuya peoples of western Oregon... a private contractor, conducting research, giving historical presentations and writing articles about the tribes of Oregon."

According to the Oregon Historical Society,

Lewis engaged in research on the tribes of the Pacific Northwest while studying at the University of Oregon and working for the Confederated Tribes of Grand Ronde. He also served as the director of the Southwest Oregon Research Project Collection at the UO Knight Library Special Collections and University Archives. He has served in the culture programs at Grand Ronde, first on the Culture Committee, then as department manager, cultural liaison, tribal historian, and manager of the Exhibits and Archives program. For two terms he sat on Oregon Heritage Commission, serving as chair for two years. He has a Ph.D. in anthropology from the University of Oregon (2009) and is an assistant professor of anthropology and indigenous studies at Oregon State University. Lewis conducts research, gives historical presentations, and writes articles about the tribes of Oregon. He is the author of Tribal Histories of the Willamette Valley (2024).

Lewis' résumé lists his part-time teaching assignments at multiple colleges and universities in Oregon before his OSU faculty appointment. Lewis' teaching routine then involved:

...working four different jobs at four different institutions – OSU, Lane Community College in Eugene, Portland Community College and Portland State University. He'd teach classes on different days, and set up his schedule so that, for example, on one day, he'd teach at PCC in the morning and then PSU in the afternoon. The next day, he would teach during the day at OSU and in the evening at LCC. "It was crazy," he said. "I was constantly traveling."

When Lewis was appointed in 2022 as assistant professor of anthropology and ethnic studies at Oregon State University (OSU), the University described his appointment as "an enrolled member of the Confederated Tribes of the Grand Ronde... the first Kalapuyan tenure-track appointment in OSU history. He's known throughout the state for consulting work and for his work researching Oregon Native American history."

== Selected publications ==
=== Books ===
- Lewis, David G. (November 14, 2023). Tribal Histories of the Willamette Valley. Portland State University: Ooligan Press. ISBN 9781947845404.

=== Articles ===
- Lewis, David G. (2014). "Four Deaths: The Near Destruction of Western Oregon Tribes and Native Lifeways, Removal to the Reservation, and Erasure from History". Oregon Historical Quarterly. 115 (3): 414–437. doi:10.1353/ohq.2014.0075. ISSN 2329-3780.
- Fernandez, Natalia M.; Lewis, David G. (2015). "Developing and Organizing an Archival Education Training Opportunity for Oregon's Tribal Communities: The Oregon Tribal Archives Institute". Journal of Western Archives. 6 (1) 5.
- Lewis, David G.; Connolly, Thomas J. (2019). "White American Violence on Tribal Peoples on the Oregon Coast". Oregon Historical Quarterly. 120 (4): 368–381. doi:10.1353/ohq.2019.0028. ISSN 2329-3780.
- Johnston, James D.; Schmidt, Micah R.; Merschel, Andrew G.; Downing, William M.; Coughlan, Michael R.; Lewis, David G. (December 2023). "Exceptional variability in historical fire regimes across a western Cascades landscape, Oregon, USA". Ecosphere. 14 (12) e4735. Bibcode:2023Ecosp..14E4735J. doi:10.1002/ecs2.4735. ISSN 2150-8925.
- Coughlan, Michael R.; Johnston, James D.; Derr, Kelly M.; Lewis, David G.; Johnson, Bart R. (June 26, 2024). "Pre-contact Indigenous fire stewardship: a research framework and application to a Pacific Northwest temperate rainforest". Frontiers in Environmental Archaeology. 3. Frontiers. doi:10.3389/fearc.2024.1347571. ISSN 2813-432X.
- Lewis, David G. (December 7, 2025). "The Ili'i Is Améewi: Recovering Indigenous Environments of the Willamette Valley". American Indian Culture and Research Journal. 48 (3). doi:10.17953/A3.24890. ISSN 0161-6463.
- Hamman, Sarah T.; LeCompte, Joyce; Lewis, David G.; swəlítub Mitchell, Todd A.; Major, Maurice; Krohn, Elise; Harvey, Mariana; Qol7ánten Barr, Samuel (July 22, 2026). "Restoring Camas Prairie Cultural Ecosystems: Models of Indigenous Co-Stewardship on the Northwest Coast". Natural Areas Journal. 46 (3): 250–258. doi:10.3375/2162-4399-46.3.9. ISSN 0885-8608.
