= Eugene Saturday Market =

Weekly art and craft market in Eugene, Oregon

Coordinates: 44.050938°N 123.091185°W

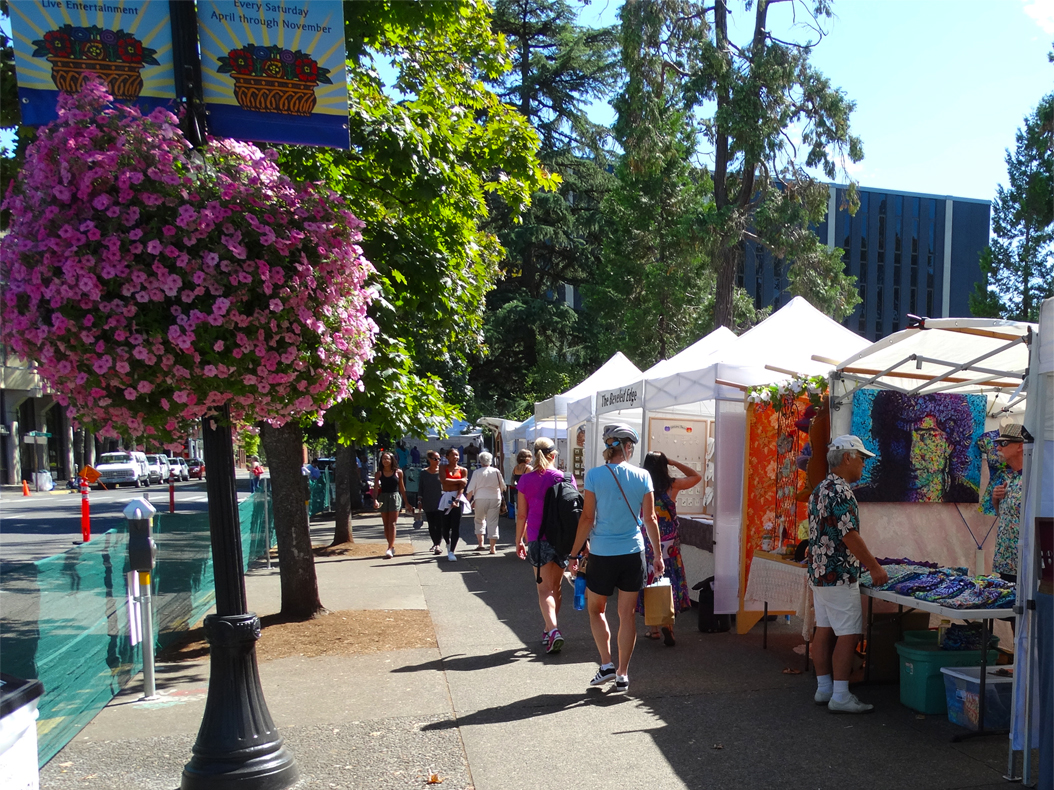
- Street view of Eugene Saturday Market craft booths.
- Genre: Craft Market
- Dates: April–November
- Locations: Eugene, Oregon, United States
- Years active: 1970–present
- Website: eugenesaturdaymarket.org

The Eugene Saturday Market is an outdoor craft market in Eugene, Oregon. It is the oldest weekly open-air crafts market in the United States. It has a festival atmosphere that includes live performers as well as art and crafts displays and sales, and also food booths and other local vendors. Between 3,000 and 5,000 people visit the market every Saturday.

== History ==
Lotte Streisinger, a noted artist and community activist, and the wife of George Streisinger, founded the Eugene Saturday Market.

The market first opened on May 9, 1970, with 29 vendors. It was located on city property adjacent to a city-owned parking structure in downtown Eugene. Each vendor paid $1 to participate. On the opening Saturday, it rained all day. Nevertheless, the market was successful enough that the Eugene City Council agreed to allow the hippies to continue using the site. More vendors joined the market as the Christmas holiday approached. The first season closed on the Saturday before Christmas with about one hundred vendors crowding into the market area.

At the end of the first season, established businesses adjacent to the Saturday Market venue petitioned the city to close or move the market. Lane County commissioners offered a county-owned plaza, the Park Blocks, in front of the county courthouse for the market on condition that the Saturday market incorporate and secure liability insurance. As a result, the Eugene Saturday Market was officially established. This arrangement with Lane County allowed the use of the Park Blocks only during the summer months. In the fall, the vendors were required to move to the upper level of a county-owned parking structure, known as the "butterfly lot", across the street from the Park Blocks. The Eugene Saturday Market continued to operate in those two locations until the end of the 1982 season.

Over time, the Saturday markets held in the parking structure lost their customer base. As the number of vendors dwindled, the Saturday Market board of directors began working with the City of Eugene and Lane County officials to find a new venue. In April 1983, the Eugene Saturday Market was relocated to a two-block park area at the intersection of Oak Street and 8th Avenue. This new venue was an attractive setting, with a central fountain and had enough space for 100 to 125 vendors. It was also centrally located in the downtown areas. Over the years, this has helped attract people to the market. In 2006, the City of Eugene prepared a master plan for the Park Block area. The plan included the Saturday Market as an important element in the area's long-term development. Today, the Eugene Saturday Market is the oldest continuously operating weekly open-air crafts market in the United States. It inspired the creation of a similar market in Portland, which took the same sort of name, the Portland Saturday Market, and has been in operation since 1974.

== Farmers market ==
In 1978, a county task force was created to determine if a farmers market could be successful if it were located adjacent to the Eugene Saturday Market. The concept was to offer an open-air venue for local growers to market their produce directly to the public. The Eugene Saturday Market organization would oversee the new farmers market. Based on the task force's recommendation, the county approved the first farmers market in August 1979. It was held on Saturday in a parking lot adjacent to the Saturday Market. The Lane County Farmers Market became an independent organization in 1989. While it has not been as successful financially as the Saturday Market, the farmers market is still open from April through November ever year.

== Marketplace ==
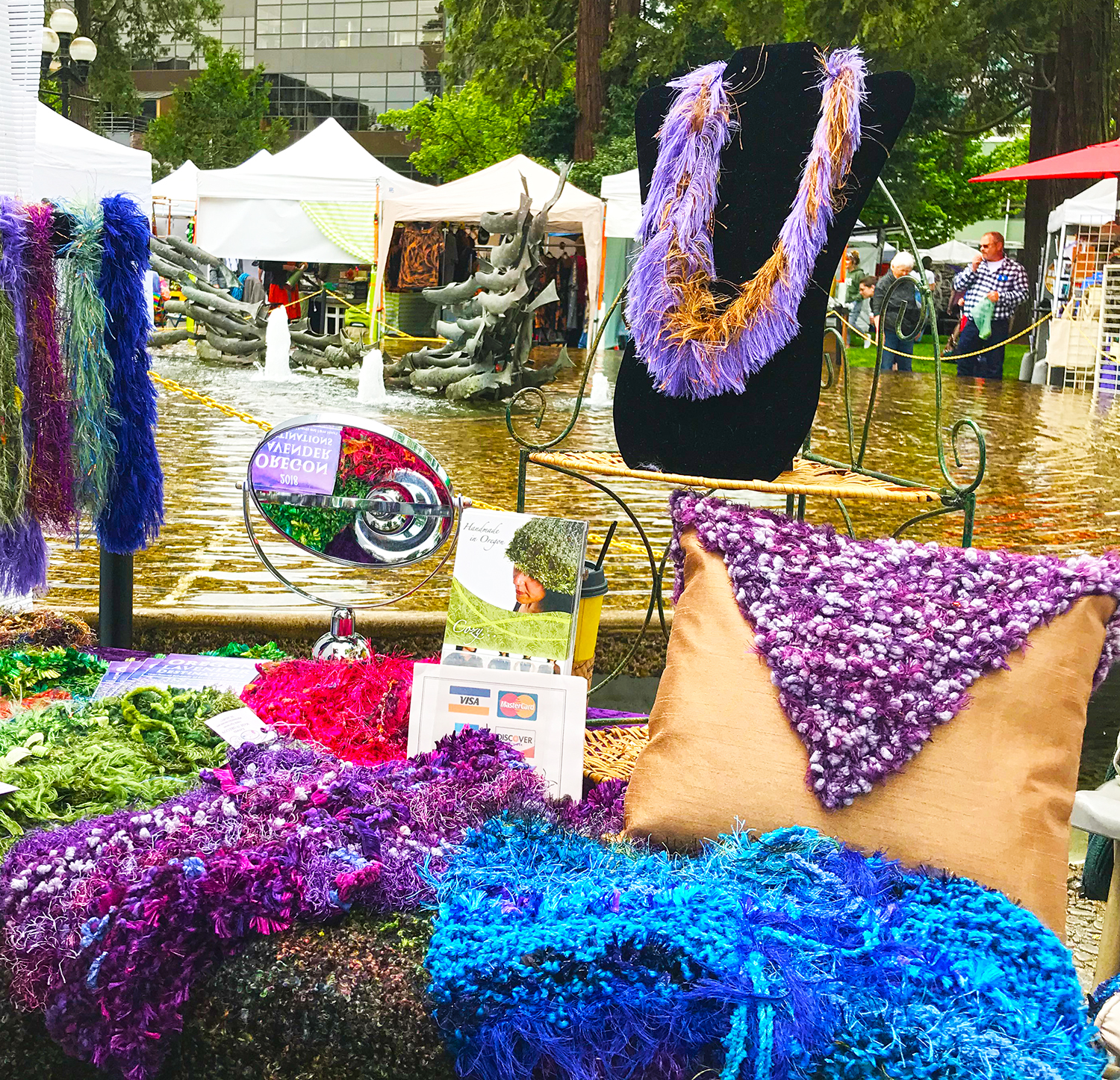
View of the fountain through a fiber artist's booth at Eugene Saturday Market.

The Eugene Saturday Market is open every Saturday from early April until mid-November regardless of weather. The market opens at ten o'clock in the morning and closes at five o'clock in the afternoon. On the weekend before Thanksgiving, the market moves to the Lane County Fairgrounds where it is held indoors through Christmas Eve. This market is called the Holiday Market

There is no admission charge and people walk through the market area freely. During a normal Saturday, between 3,000 and 5,000 people visit the market. Every year, shoppers buy approximately $2.5 million worth of handcrafts and food from Saturday Market vendors.

Everything sold at the Saturday Market is handcrafted. In addition, all of the products for sale at the market must be sold by the person who made them or a member of their immediate family. The market offers a wide variety of handcrafted goods including artwork, jewelry, clothing, and craft furniture. Vendors also sell homemade jams, breads, and honey.

There are about fifteen food booths at the market. The food court features many global food cuisines, including Afghani, English, Indian, Mexican, Thai, and American. The food booths must meet all state health department regulations and licensing requirements. The food service operations are also subject to regular public health inspections.

The Eugene Saturday Market provides a venue for local musicians and other performing artists. There are six stage performances every week. There is a kid friendly act at 10am on the Saturday Market stage every week. There are also strolling performers who play in open areas throughout the Park Blocks. During the course of a year, over one thousand performers appear on the Saturday Market stage.

Currently, there are over 700 members of the Eugene Saturday Market. About 300 of these members are active vendors who regularly sell crafts or food at the market. Members pay an annual $50 fee. On Saturdays, vendors pay $13 to rent an eight-foot by eight-foot booth or $8 for a four-foot by four-foot booth. Vendors must also pay ten percent of their sales revenue to the Saturday Market.

== Awards ==
The Eugene Saturday Market won local recognition as Lane County's first-best place for a family outing in The Register-Guard's Readers' Choice awards in 2010.

Eugene Saturday Market won the 2018 Fentress Endowment Award presented at The Arts & Business Alliance of Eugene's BRAVA Breakfast. This award, established by Carroll D. and Harriet Fentress in 1984, is given annually to a local arts organization for exceptional work and achievement in the arts. The winner is selected by a committee of local Eugene artists and community leaders. The committee chose Eugene Saturday Market to recognize the important role the Market has played in Eugene's community as a venue for local artists, crafts people and performers.

== Governance ==
The Saturday Market is a not-for-profit-organization. Its board of directors sets policy and oversees market operations. The board has nine members elected by Saturday Market members. Each director serves for 18 months and may be re-elected once. An election is held every three months with three director positions being filled at each election. The members of the board elect a chairperson, who serves for one year. The board also elects a treasurer.

The Saturday Market standards committee was established in 1981. It establishes guidelines for crafts sold at the market and is responsible for setting on-site marketing rules. It also resolves disputes between vendors. In addition, a budget committee works with the board of directors to ensure the organization remain financially healthy. The budget committee prepares an annual budget and a vendor fee schedule for board approval.

The board of directors hires employees and sets their salaries. Currently, there are only three full-time employees; a director, a financial coordinator, and a promotions coordinator. There are also twelve part-time employees who help set up and take down the stage and information booth on Saturdays.

== See also ==
- Salem Saturday Market
