= Ryan Bailey (sprinter) =

American sprinter (born 1989)

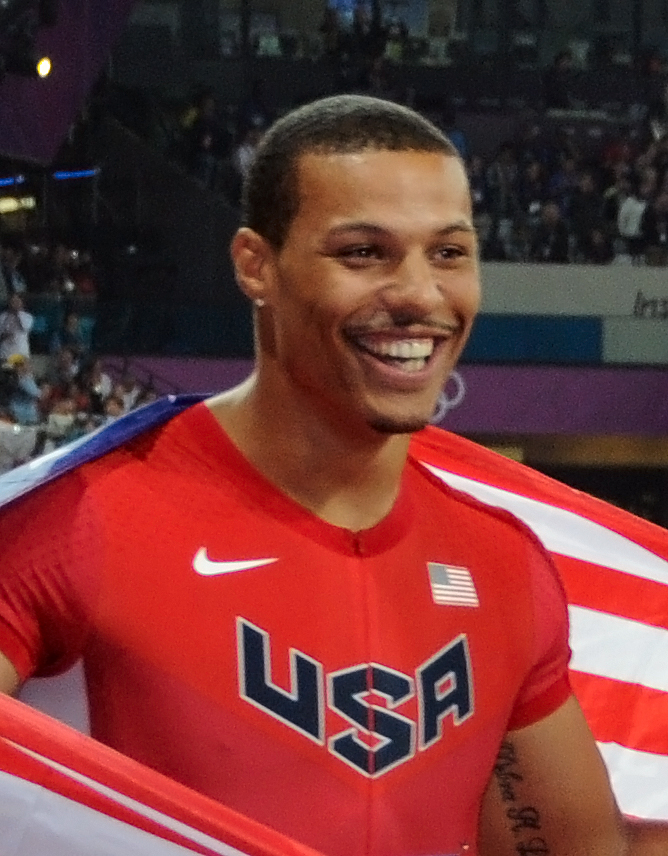

Personal information
- Born: April 13, 1989 (age 37) Portland, Oregon, U.S.
- Height: 6 ft 4 in (1.93 m)
- Weight: 180 lb (82 kg)

Sport
- Sport: Track and field
- Event: Sprints

Achievements and titles
- Personal best(s): 100 m: 9.88 (Rieti 2010); 200 m: 20.10 (Zürich 2010)
Medal record
Men's athletics
Representing the United States
Gold medal – first place	2015 Nassau	4×100 m relay

Ryan Bailey (born April 13, 1989) is an American sprinter. He has personal bests of 9.88 seconds for the 100-meter dash and 20.10 seconds for the 200-meter dash. He ranks among the top ten Americans ever for the shorter distance.

== Career ==
A native of Portland, Oregon, Bailey attended Douglas McKay High School in Salem, where he won the 2007 Oregon State Championships 6A titles at 100 metres and 200 metres, and then went on to finish second and third over 200 metres at the Nike Outdoor Championships and USATF Junior Championships, respectively. After graduation, he began studying part-time at Chemeketa Community College.

He relocated to Ina, Illinois in January 2009, to attend Rend Lake College, known as one of the top junior college track and field programs in the United States. At Rend Lake, Bailey won the 55 metres dash at the National Junior College Indoor Championships and, during the outdoor season, won the 100 meters and finished second in the 200 meters at the National Junior College Track & Field Championships. His time of 10.05 was a personal best and a national junior college record. His 100 m time made him the 13th fastest American sprinter in 2009. He turned pro in August 2009, signing with Nike.

In August 2010, Bailey ran a new personal best of 9.88 seconds in the 100 metres, finishing second only to Nesta Carter (9.78 s) in Rieti, Italy. He also ran 20.10 to lower his personal best in the 200 m while placing third in the Weltklasse meet in Zurich, Switzerland and also finish the season third in the IAAF Diamond League 200 standings.

At the 2012 United States Olympic Trials, he gained a place on the Olympic team by finishing third in the 100 m final with a time of 9.93 seconds.

Bailey began his Olympic debut at the 2012 Summer Olympics in London, by winning his heat in Round 1 of the 100 metres in a time of 9.88 seconds, equaling his personal best at that time. He equaled that time again in the final for a fourth-place finish. He also competed in the men's 4x100m final and won a silver medal for team USA, equalling the Olympic record of 37.10 seconds behind team Jamaica.

In 2016 Bailey tried his hand at bobsledding, winning the National Push Championship preliminaries in August before winning the brakeman title at the Championships the following month.

== Personal bests ==
Event	Time (seconds)	Venue	Date
60 metres	6.50	Seattle, Washington, United States	14 February 2015
100 metres	9.88	Rieti, Italy London, Great Britain	29 August 2010, 4 and 5 August 2012
200 metres	20.10	Zürich, Switzerland	19 August 2010
