= Salem Community Markets =

Nonprofit organization in Oregon, U.S.

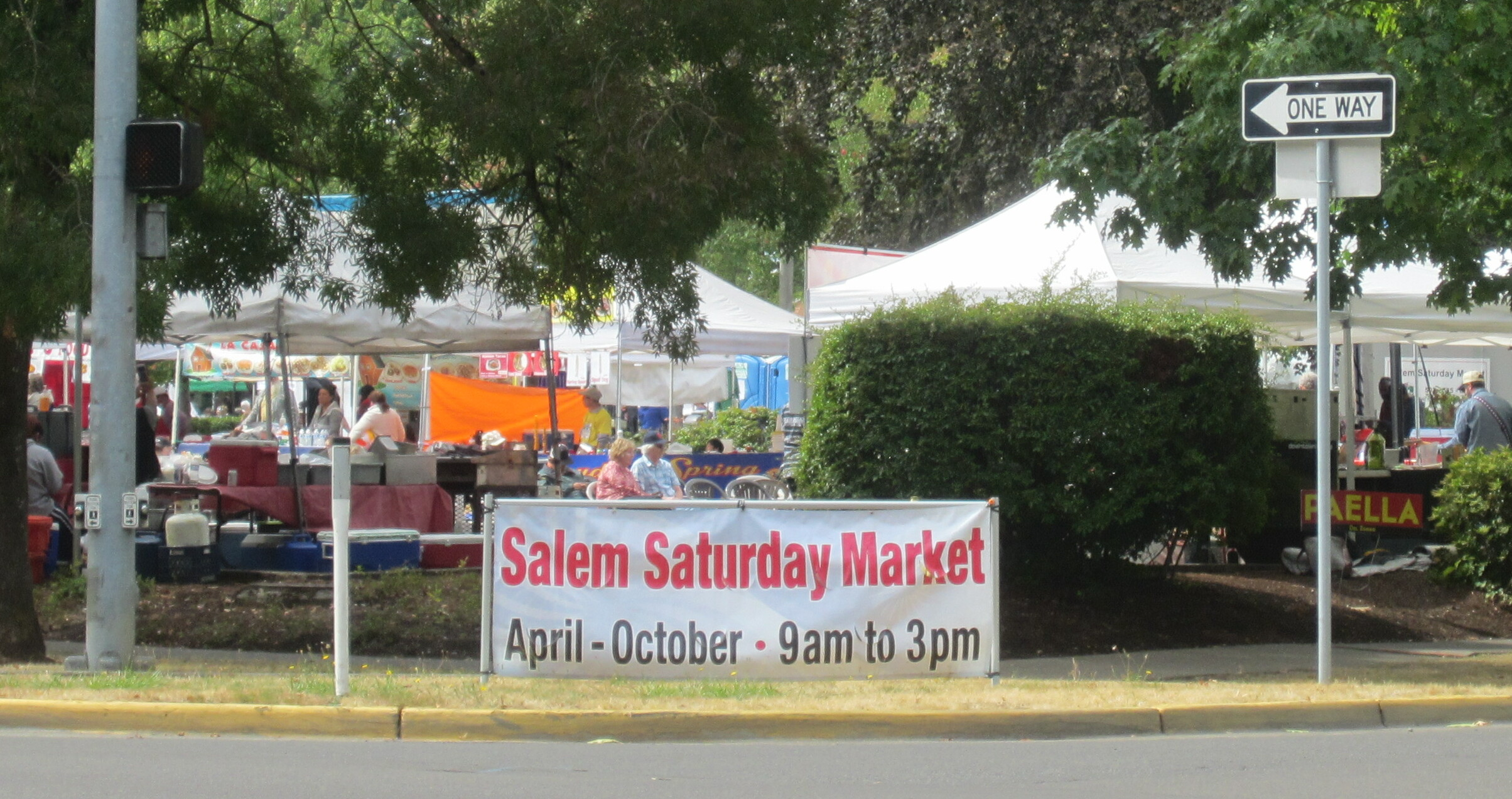
- Formation: 1998
- Type: Nonprofit
- Headquarters: 1320 Waller St SE
- Location: Salem, OR, United States
- Website: salemcommunitymarkets.com
- Formerly called: Salem Saturday Market

Salem Community Markets (SCM), formerly known as Salem Saturday Market (SSM), is a nonprofit organization which operates multiple farmers' markets and related events in Salem, Oregon. As of the 2023 season, there are four main markets: the Monday Hospital Market, the Wednesday Chemeketa Market, the Thursday West Salem Market, and the traditional Salem Saturday Market. There is also a three-day Salem Holiday Market event in December.

== History ==
=== 2018 season ===
The 2018 season lasted from April 14th to October 4th. This was shorter than initially planned; the opening was postponed and the planned last market date was cancelled, both due to weather concerns.

2018 marked the 20-year anniversary of the Salem Saturday Market and a celebration was held at the market on May 5th.

The year also saw a new market added to the calendar: the West Salem Thursday Market, open every Thursday from 10am to 2pm, July 5th through September 27th. Now there were five SCM-run markers in Salem (including the Holiday Market), and shoppers could find a local market four days out of every week during the peak months.

A new market match EBT program was also introduced in 2018.

=== 2023 season ===
2023 marked the 25th anniversary of the Salem Saturday Market. That year, the main market took place at the usual spot every Saturday from March 4th to October 28th, from 9am to 2pm local time.

=== 2024 season ===
The 2024 season is the 26th Season of the Salem Saturday Market which takes place at the State of Oregon Green Lot located on the corner of Summer & Marion Streets. It had 591 total vendors in the season throughout its 4 markets.

== See also ==
- Eugene Saturday Market
- Lane County Farmers Market, Eugene
- Portland Farmers Market (Oregon)
