= Lane County Farmers Market =

Farmers' market in Eugene, Oregon, US

Coordinates: 44.050714°N 123.09126°W

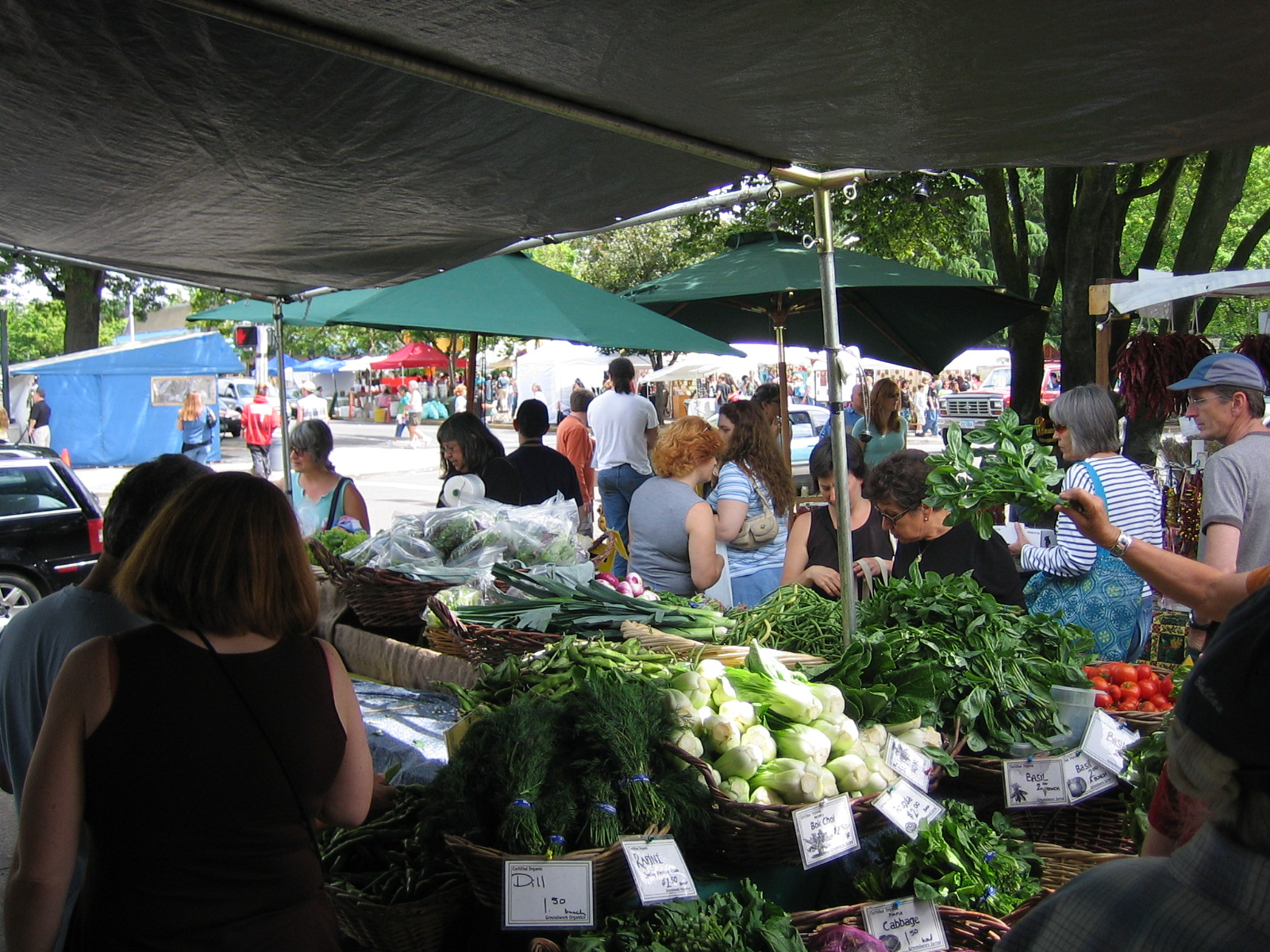
- Vegetables at Lane County Farmers Market
- Dates: January–December
- Locations: Eugene, Oregon, U.S.A.
- Website: Lane County Farmers Market

The Lane County Farmers Market (also known as LCFM) is the largest farmers market in Eugene, Oregon, United States. It provides fresh, locally grown produce, food products, flowers, and plants where shoppers buy directly from the producers.

== History ==
The Lane County Farmers Market is related to the first public market in Lane County, which began in 1915. The market location, at the corner of 8th Avenue and Oak Street, in downtown Eugene is where it began, though competition from large supermarkets and other conditions contributed to its closure in 1959. Reopening in 1979, it has grown and now features just over 100 growers and producers.

== Present ==
The market features fresh Oregon-grown fruits, vegetables, herbs, flowers, plants, meat, seafood, eggs, baked goods, honey, and prepared foods and beverages. Products vary throughout the year according to seasonality. The market runs on Saturdays, mid-January through mid-December, and Tuesdays, May through October, in downtown Eugene. In 2026, LCFM opened a market in Springfield, Oregon, that runs on Sundays from June through October. Membership is open to Oregon residents who grow or make their own agricultural and artisan food products.

== See also ==
- Eugene Saturday Market
- Salem Saturday Market
