= Douglas McKay High School =

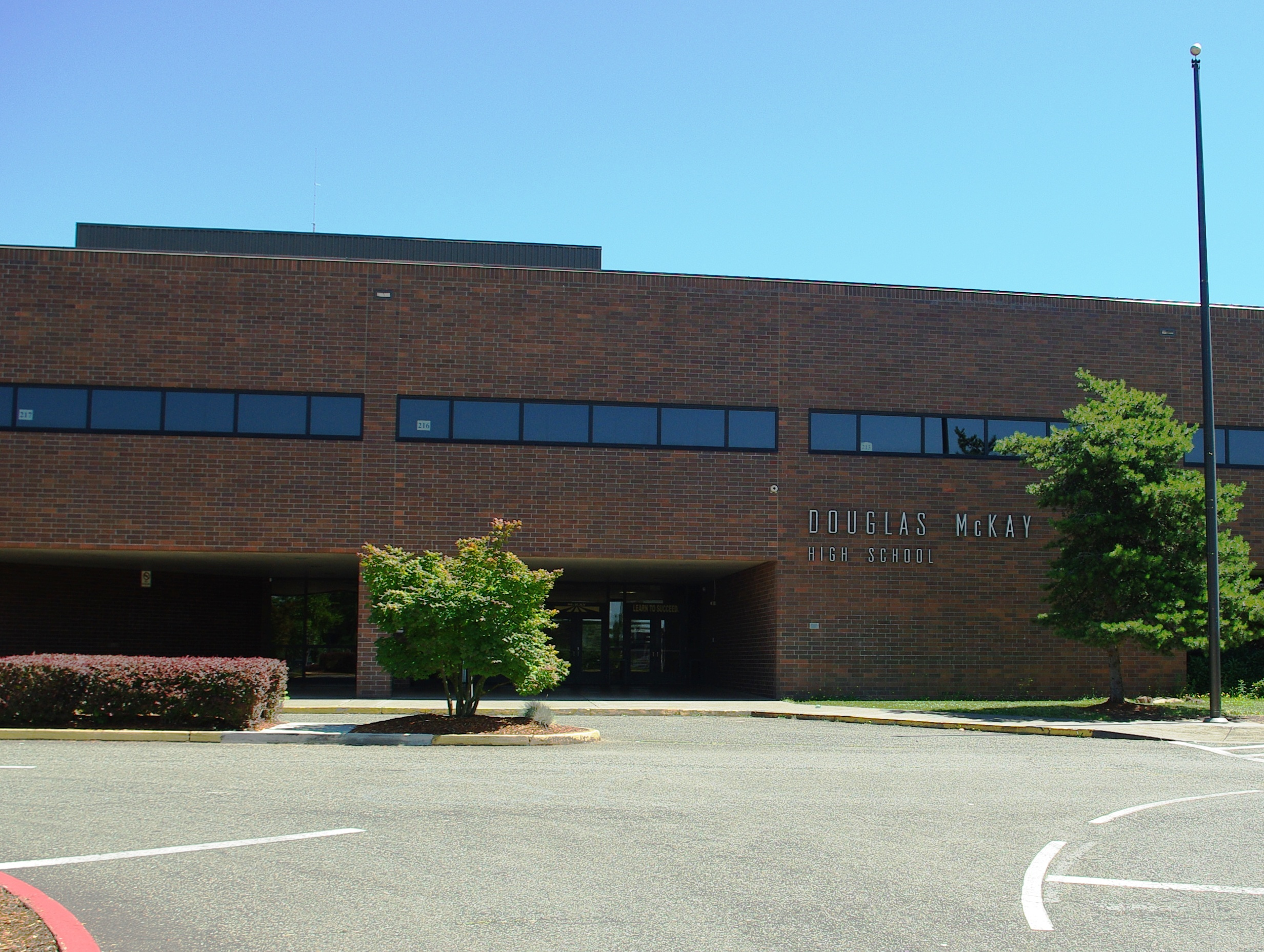

Location
- 2440 Lancaster Dr NE; Salem, (Marion County), Oregon 97305; United States; 44.9570°N 122.9796°W

Information
- Type: Public
- Opened: 1979
- School district: Salem-Keizer School District
- Principal: Ranae Quiring
- Staff: 100.65 (FTE)
- Grades: 9-12
- Enrollment: 2,299 (2023–2024)
- Student to teacher ratio: 22.84
- Colors: Kelly green, royal blue, and Vegas gold
- Athletics conference: OSAA 5A-3 Mid-Willamette Conference
- Mascot: Scot
- Team name: Royal Scots
- Rival: North Salem High School
- Newspaper: The Highlander, The Bagpiper
- Yearbook: The Sabre
- Feeder schools: Stephens Middle School; Waldo Middle School
- Website: mckay.salkeiz.k12.or.us

Douglas McKay High School, most commonly known as McKay, is a public high school located in the North Lancaster neighborhood of Salem, Oregon, United States. Built in 1979, the school was named after Douglas McKay, former Governor of Oregon and United States Secretary of the Interior.

== History ==
In 1976 the city of Salem announced an interest in annexing the school's site.

In 2018, Voters approved Salem-Keizer Public School's $620 million bond aimed at improving local schools. McKay High School started improvements and renovations in 2020 and finished in early 2021.

== Academics ==
In the 2015–2016 school year, 72.1% of McKay's seniors received a high school diploma, compared to a statewide rate of 74.8%.

In 2022, 84% of the school's seniors received a high school diploma. Of 614 students, 542 graduated and 72 dropped out.

As of the 2017–2018 school year, McKay offers a wide range of courses and extra-curricular activities to its students.

== Athletics ==
McKay High School Competes in the OSAA 5A-3 Mid-Willamette Conference. The athletic director is Chelsea Lofstedt and the athletics secretary is Joanna Rubio.

State Championships:

- Boys Track and Field: 1986†
- Girls Tennis: 1986†
- Dance/Drill: 1999
- Boys Soccer: 2022

† = Tied with 1 or more schools

== Notable alumni ==
- Ryan Bailey (2007) - U.S. Olympic team member - 100 meter dash, 400 meter relay team (silver medal)
- Dave Brundage (1983) - professional baseball player and minor league manager
- Gus Envela, Jr. (1986) - Olympic runner for Equatorial Guinea
- David Gene Lewis (1965) – Native American writer, editor, and activist
- Ron Funches (2001) - actor, comedian
