= Lansing, Salem, Oregon =

Neighborhood in Salem, Oregon

Coordinates: 44.959°N 122.996°W

Lansing is a neighborhood in Salem, Oregon, United States, located in the northeast part of the city. The neighborhood is bordered on the north by Silverton Road, on the south by Market Street, on the east by Hawthorne Avenue, and on the west by Evergreen Avenue.

The Lansing neighborhood contains two City of Salem Parks: East Gate Basin Park located at 3203 Hawthorne Avenue NE, and Livingston Park located at 2751 Hawthorne Avenue NE.

The Lansing neighborhood contains two Salem-Keizer Public Schools: Washington Elementary School located at 3165 Lansing Avenue NE, and Waldo Middle School located at 2805 Lansing Avenue NE.

Lansing Area Neighbors and Community Partners are currently holding Partnership Meetings on the second Thursday of each month from 10 to 11:00 am at La Casita/Little House, 3032 Sunnyview Road, NE. All who are interested in the livability of the Lansing Area are welcome to participate.

The Lansing Neighborhood Association meets on the fourth Tuesday of each month at 7:00 pm at Waldo Middle School, 2805 Lansing Avenue NE. All are welcome. Anyone who lives, works, or owns property in the Lansing Neighborhood is a member.
