= Sunnyslope, Salem, Oregon =

Neighborhood in Salem, Oregon

Coordinates: 44.886°N 123.070°W

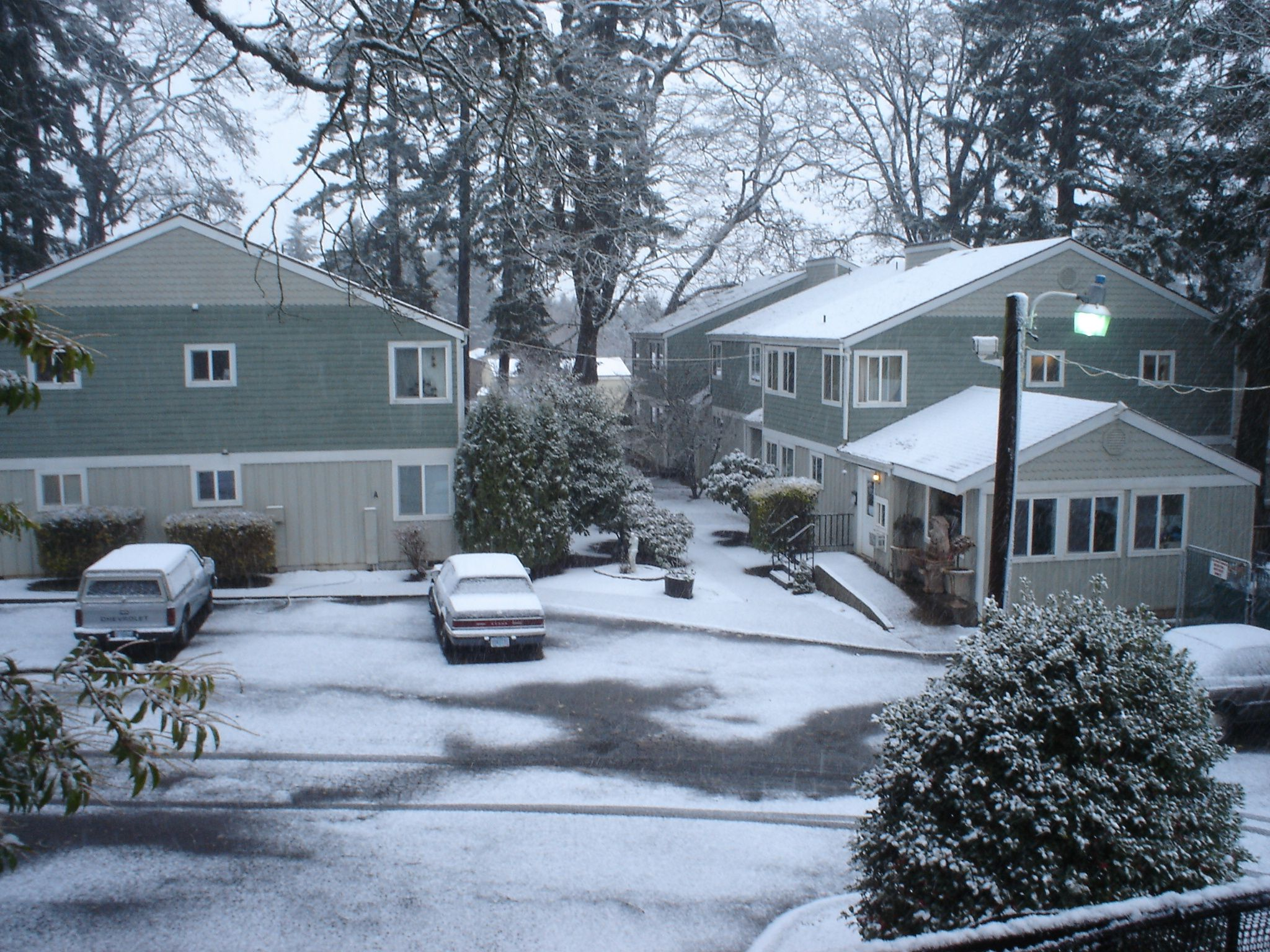
Snow at a Sunnyslope apartment complex

Sunnyslope is a primarily residential neighborhood in Salem, Oregon, United States located in the far southwest part of the city. The neighborhood is bordered on the north by Browning Avenue, and on the east with Liberty Road. Sunnyslope is home to Sprague High School.
