= North Lancaster, Salem, Oregon =

Neighborhood in Salem, Oregon, United States of America

Coordinates: 44.985867°N 122.970142°W

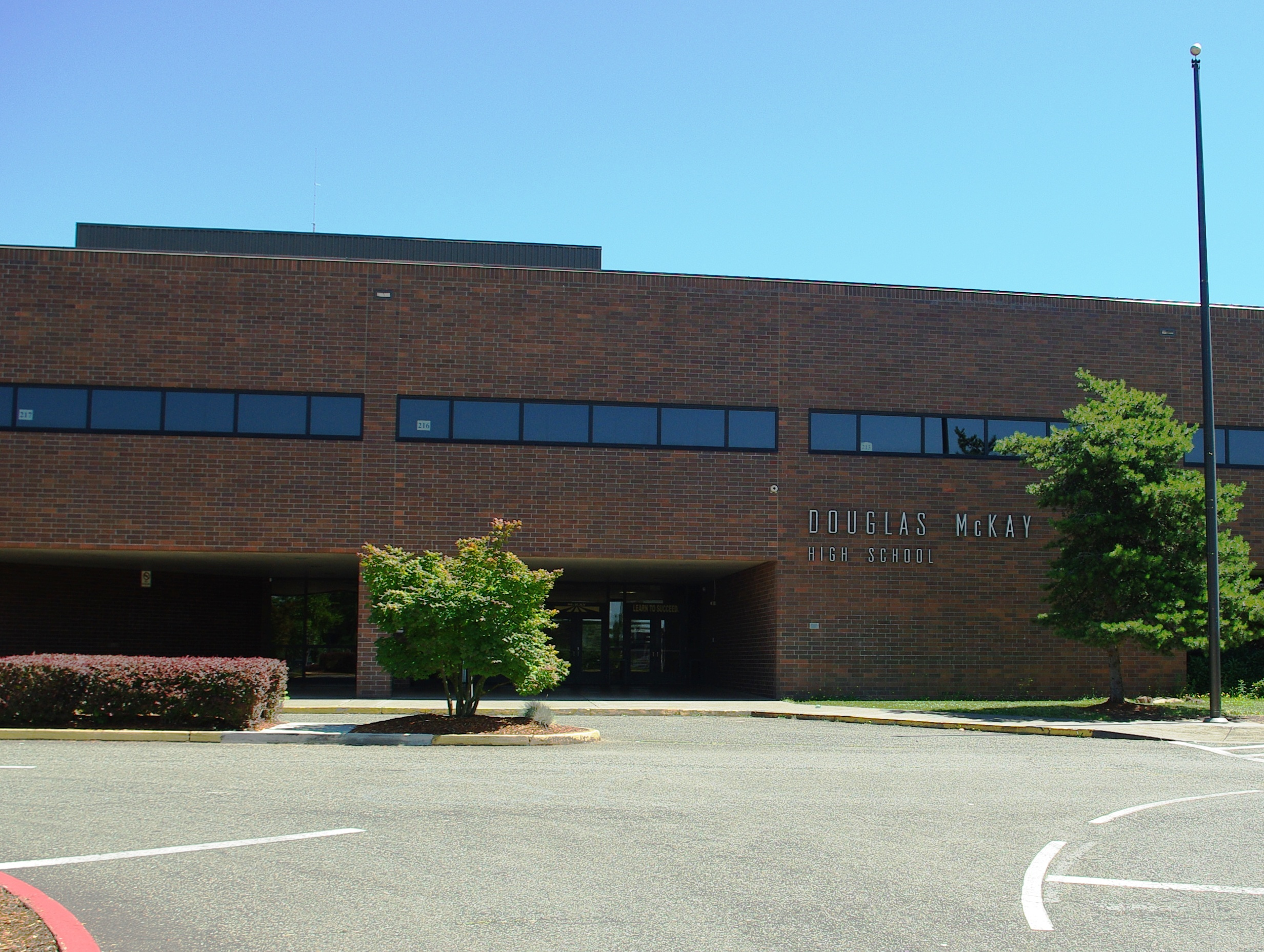
McKay High School

North Lancaster is a neighborhood in Salem, Oregon, located in the northeast part of the city. The neighborhood is bordered on the south by Sunnyview Road, and on the west with Hawthorne Avenue. North Lancaster is home to Douglas McKay High School.
