= Salem, Oregon =

Capital city of Oregon, United States

Salem, Oregon Chemeketa / Chamíkiti (Kalapuya)
- Capital city
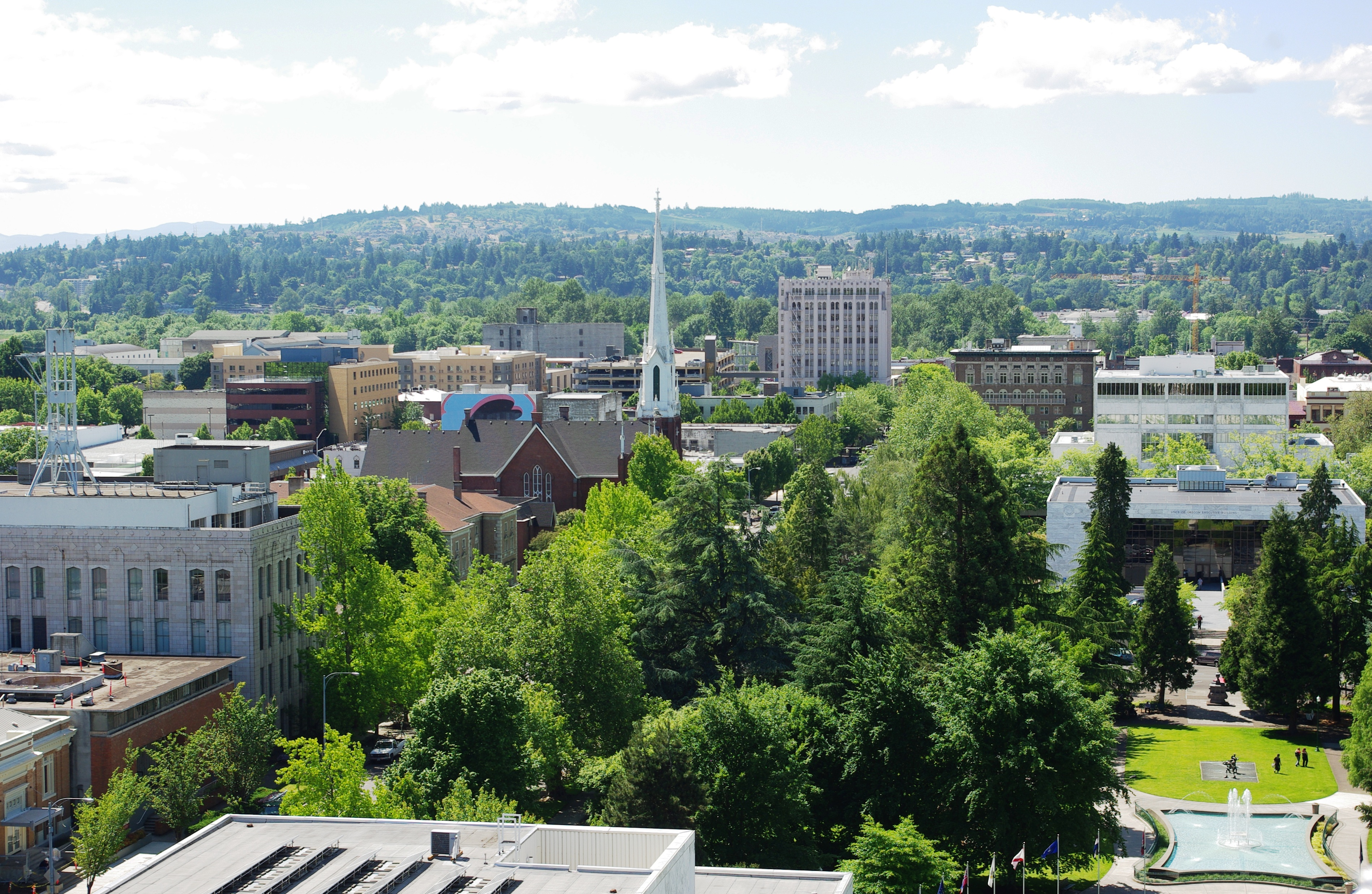
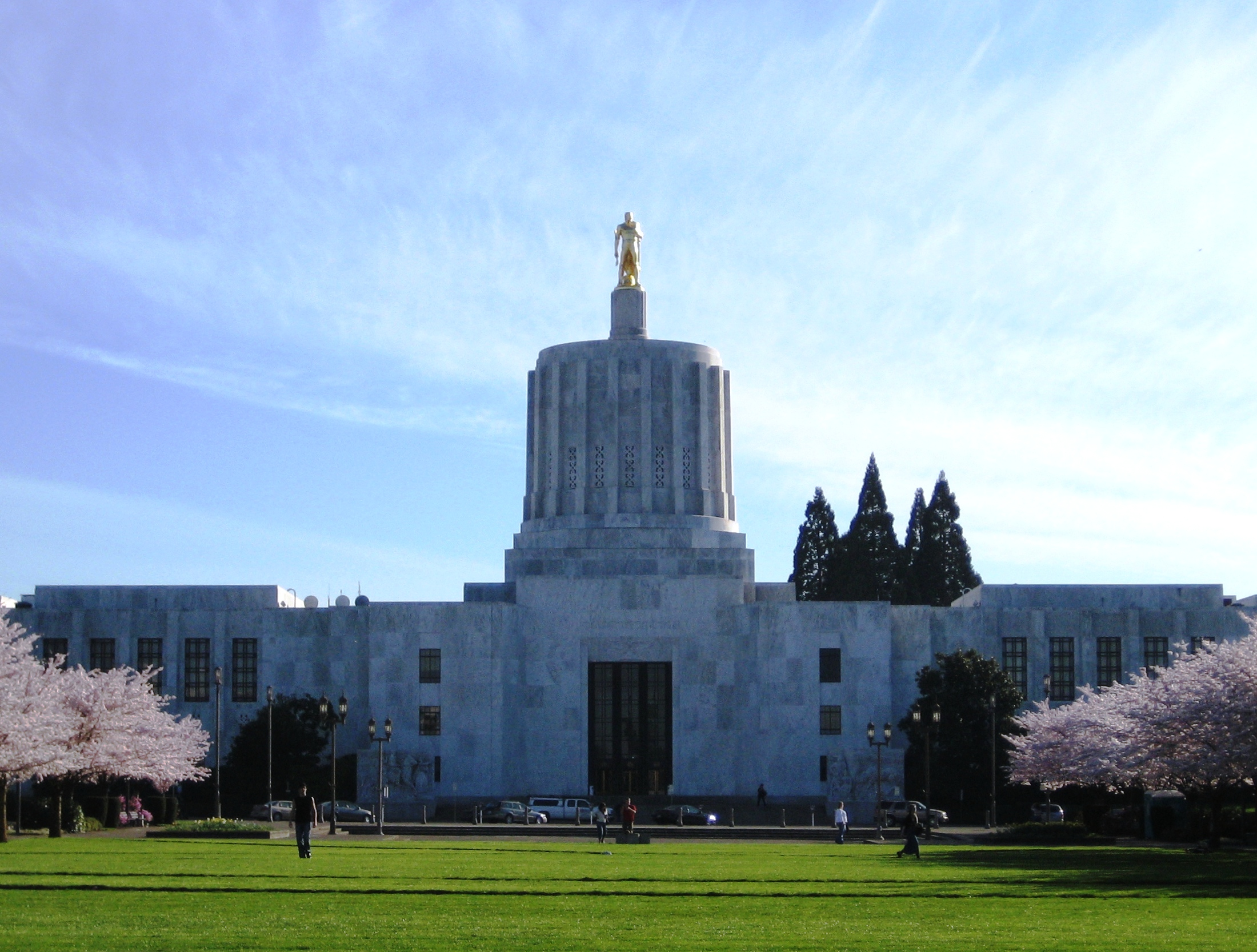
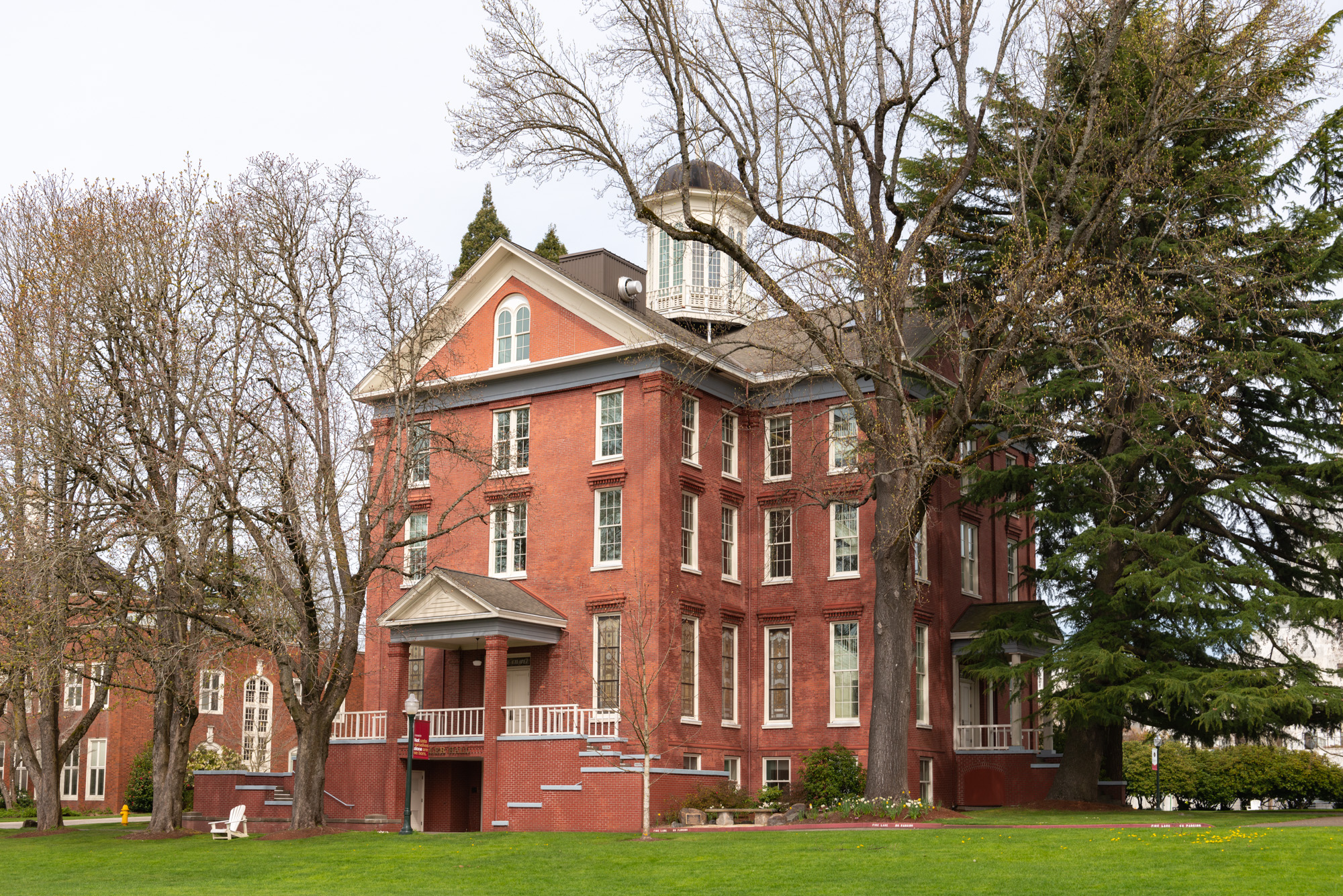
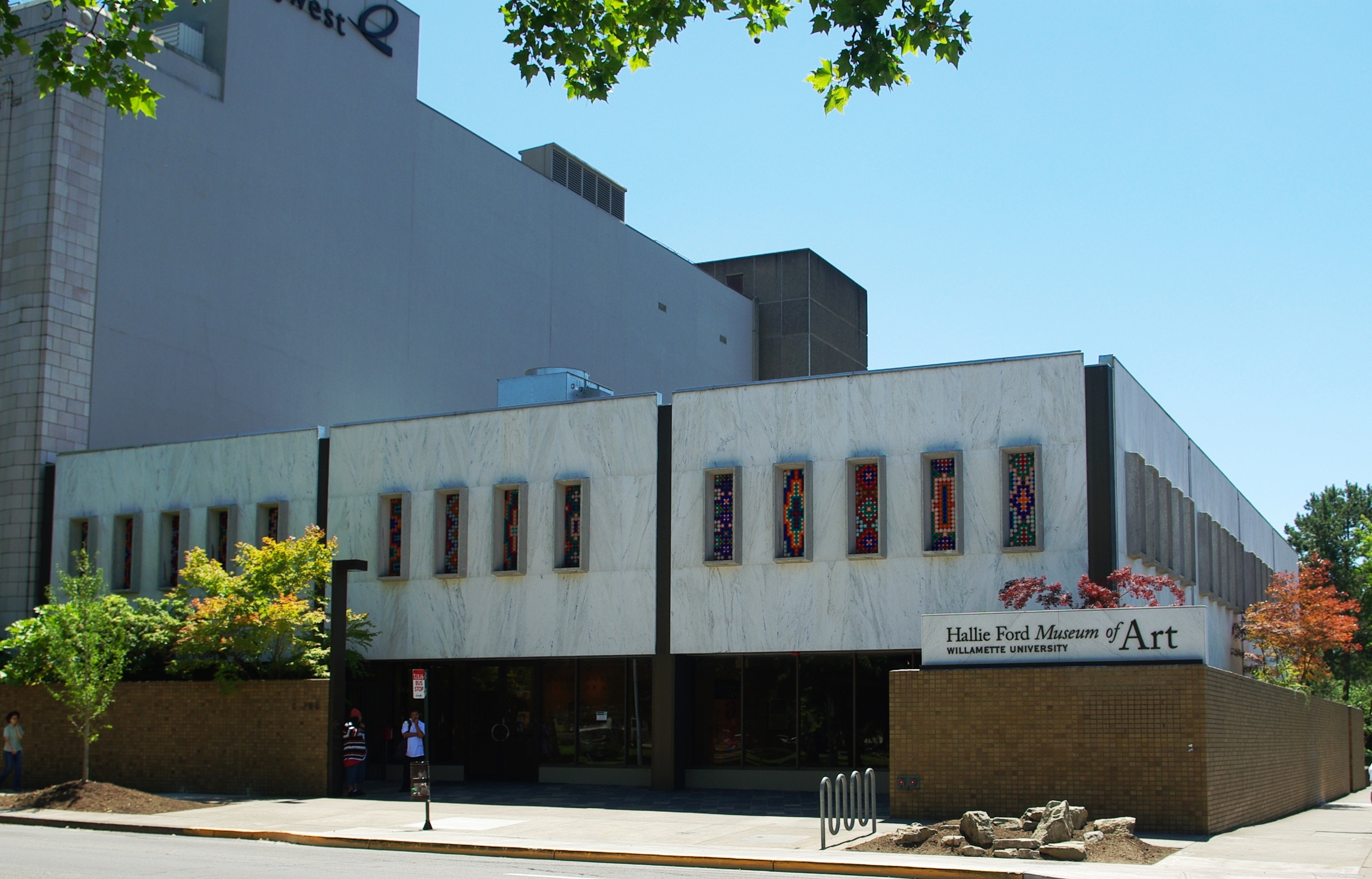
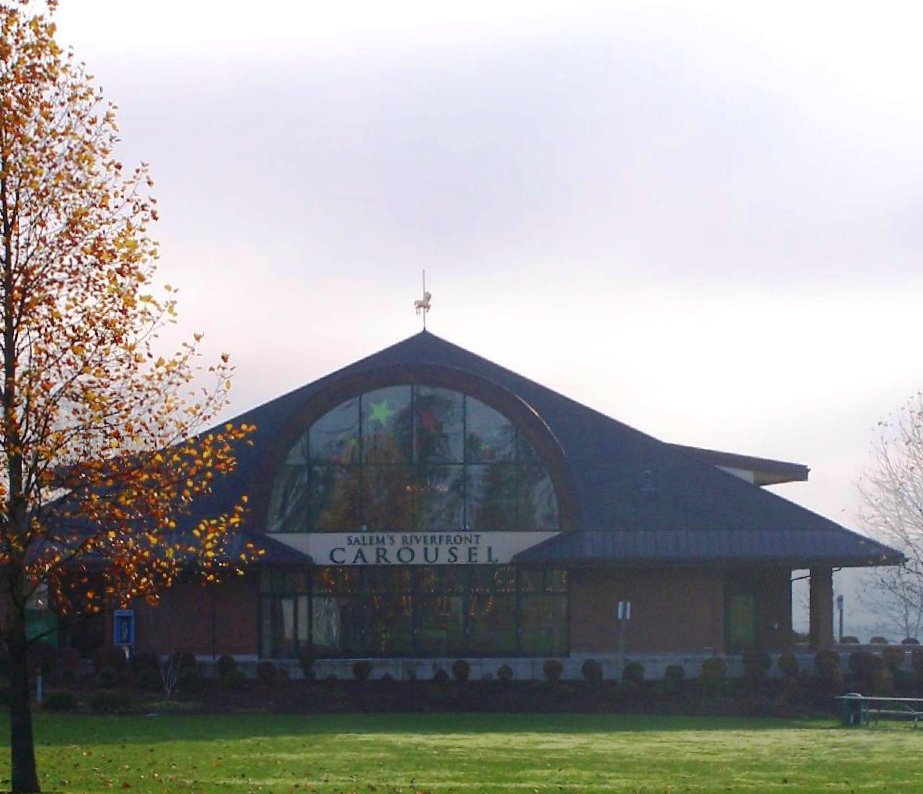
- Downtown Salem Oregon State Capitol Willamette University Hallie Ford Museum of Art Riverfront Park

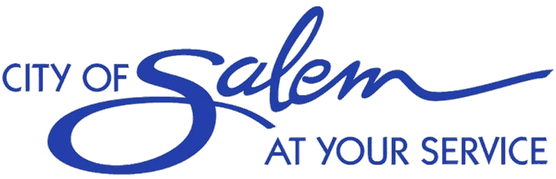
- Flag Logo
- Nickname: Cherry City
- Location of Salem, Oregon

- Location within Oregon Location within the United States
- Coordinates: 44°56′24″N 123°2′20″W
- Country: United States
- State: Oregon
- Counties: Marion, Polk
- Founded: 1842
- Incorporated: 1857

Government
  - Type: Council–manager
  - Mayor: Julie Hoy
  - City manager: Krishna Namburi
  - City Council: W1: Paul Tigan; W2: Linda Nishioka; W3: Shane Matthews; W4: Deanna Gwyn; W5: Dr. Irvin M. Brown; W6: Mai Vang; W7: Vanessa Nordyke; W8: Micki Varney

Area
  - City: 49.581 sq mi (128.414 km^{2})
  - Land: 49.030 sq mi (126.987 km^{2})
  - Water: 0.551 sq mi (1.426 km^{2}) 1.11%
  - Urban: 72.683 sq mi (188.248 km^{2})
  - Metro: 1,922.127 sq mi (4,978.287 km^{2})
- Elevation: 177 ft (54 m)

Population (2020)
  - City: 175,535
  - Estimate (2024): 180,406
  - Rank: US: 148th OR: 2nd
  - Density: 3,686.0/sq mi (1,423.16/km^{2})
  - Urban: 268,331 (US: 152nd)
  - Urban density: 3,692/sq mi (1,425.4/km^{2})
  - Metro: 443,416 (US: 123rd)
  - Metro density: 230.7/sq mi (89.07/km^{2})
  - Combined: 3,326,675 (US: 20th)
  - Combined density: 261.5/sq mi (100.98/km^{2})
- Demonym: Salemite
- Time zone: UTC–8 (Pacific (PST))
  - Summer (DST): UTC–7 (PDT)
- ZIP Codes: 97301–97312, 97314, 97317
- Area codes: 503 and 971
- FIPS code: 41-64900
- Highways: I-5, OR 99E, OR 99E Bus, OR 22, OR 221, OR 51, OR 213
- Website: cityofsalem.net

Salem (/ˈseɪ.ləm/, SAY-ləm) is the capital city of the U.S. state of Oregon, and the county seat of Marion County. Founded in 1842, it is located in the center of the Willamette Valley alongside the Willamette River, which runs north through the city. The river forms the boundary between Marion and Polk counties, and the city neighborhood of West Salem is in Polk County.

The population was 175,535 at the 2020 census, and was estimated to be 180,406 in 2024, making it the second-most populous city in the state after Portland and before Eugene.

Salem is the principal city of the Salem metropolitan area that covers Marion and Polk counties and had a combined population of 433,353 at the 2020 census and was estimated to have a population of 443,416 in 2024. This area is, in turn, part of the Portland–Vancouver–Salem Combined Statistical Area.

The city is home to Willamette University, Corban University, and Chemeketa Community College. The State of Oregon is the largest public employer in the city, and Salem Health is the largest private employer. Transportation includes public transit from Cherriots (legally known as Salem Area Mass Transit District), Amtrak service, as well as limited commercial and non-commercial air travel at McNary Field. Major roads include Interstate 5, Oregon Route 99E, and Oregon Route 22, which connects West Salem across the Willamette River via the Marion Street and Center Street bridges.

== History ==
Salem was founded in 1842, became the capital of the Oregon Territory in 1851, and was incorporated in 1857.

=== Origin of name ===
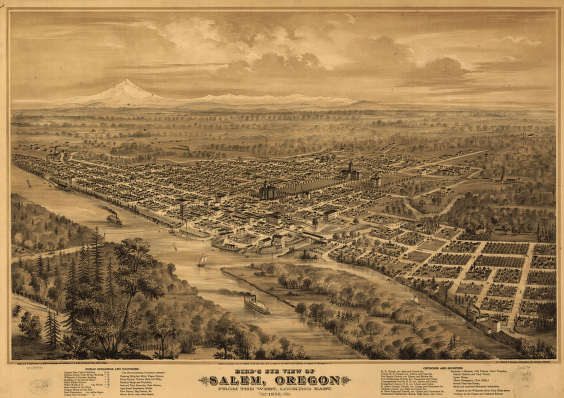
Map of Salem in 1876

The Native Americans who inhabited the central Willamette Valley at first European contact, the Kalapuya, called the area Chim-i-ki-ti, which is thought to mean "meeting or resting place" in the Central Kalapuya language (Santiam). When the Methodist Mission moved to the area, they called the new establishment Chemeketa; although it was more widely known as the Mill, because of its situation on Mill Creek. When the Oregon Institute was established, the community became known as the institute.

When the institute was dissolved, the trustees decided to lay out a town site on the Institute lands. Some possible sources for the name "Salem" include William H. Willson, who in 1850 and 1851 filed the plans for the main part of the city, and suggested adopting an Anglicized version of the Biblical Hebrew word "שָׁלוֹם, Shalom", meaning "peace" (used also as a greeting). The Reverend David Leslie, President of the town's Trustees, also wanted a Biblical name, and suggested using the last five letters of "Jerusalem". Or, the town may be named after Salem, Massachusetts, where Leslie was educated. There were many names suggested, and even after the change to Salem, some people, such as Asahel Bush (editor of the Oregon Statesman), believed the name should be changed back to Chemeketa. The Vern Miller Civic Center, which houses the city offices and library, has a public space dedicated as the Peace Plaza in recognition of the names by which the city has been known.

=== Europeans ===
The first people of European descent arrived in the area as early as 1812; they were animal trappers and food gatherers for the fur trading companies in Astoria, Oregon.

The first permanent American settlement in the area was the Jason Lee Methodist mission (1840) located in the area north of Salem known as Wheatland. In 1842, the missionaries established the Oregon Institute (the forerunner of Willamette University) in the area that was to become the site of Salem. In 1844, the mission was dissolved and the town site established.

In 1851, Salem became the territorial capital after it was moved from Oregon City. The capital was moved briefly to Corvallis in 1855, but was moved back to Salem permanently that same year. Salem incorporated as a city in 1857, and with the coming of statehood in 1859, it became the state capital.

=== Capitol buildings ===
Capitol building after 1935 fire

Oregon has had three capitol buildings in Salem. A two-story state house, which had been occupied for only two months, burned to the ground in December 1855. Oregon's second capitol building was completed in 1876 on the site of the original. The Greek Revival-style building was based in part on the U.S. Capitol building. The building received its distinctive copper dome in 1893. On April 25, 1935, this building was also destroyed by fire. The third and current Oregon State Capitol was completed on the same site in 1938. It faces north instead of west like its predecessor, and is recognizable by its distinctive pioneer statue atop the capitol dome that is plated with gold-leaf and officially named the Oregon Pioneer.

=== State fair and cherry festival ===
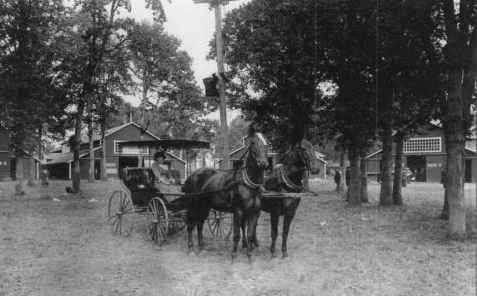
Oregon State Fair 1867

Agriculture has always been important to Salem, and the city has historically recognized and celebrated it in a number of ways. In 1861, Salem was chosen as the permanent site of the Oregon State Fair by the Oregon State Agricultural Association. Salem is nicknamed the "Cherry City", because of the past importance of the local cherry-growing industry. The first cherry festival in Salem was held in 1903 and was an annual event, with parades and the election of a cherry queen, until sometime after World War I. The event was briefly revived as the Salem Cherryland Festival for several years in the late 1940s.

== Geography and climate ==
Salem is located in the north-central Willamette Valley, in Marion and Polk counties. The 45th Parallel (roughly the halfway point between the North Pole and the Equator) passes through Salem's city limits.

According to the United States Census Bureau, the city has a total area of 49.495 square miles (128.19 km^{2}), of which 48.944 square miles (126.76 km^{2}) is land and 0.551 square miles (1.43 km^{2}) (1.11%) is water.

Although the Willamette River flows through Salem, the North Santiam River watershed is Salem's primary drinking water source. Other important streams that pass through Salem are Mill Creek, the Mill Race, Pringle Creek, and Shelton Ditch. Smaller streams in the southern and southeastern parts of the city include Clark Creek, Jory Creek, Battle Creek, Croisan Creek, and Claggett Creek, while Glen Creek and Brush Creek flow through West Salem.

Elevation within the city limits ranges from about 120 to 800 feet (37 to 244 m). Salem contains the volcanic Salem Hills in the south and is sandwiched by the 1,000 ft (300 m) Eola Hills directly to the west and the 600 ft (180 m) Waldo Hills to the east. Northern and eastern Salem are less hilly. South and West Salem contain some canyons and are the hilliest areas. The coast range and the Cascades—including Mount Hood, Mount Jefferson, and on the clearest of days, Mount St. Helens and Mount Adams in Washington—can be viewed from throughout the city.

Climate chart for Salem

Like most of the Willamette Valley area, Salem has a mediterranean climate (Köppen Csb). Rain is heaviest in late fall and throughout winter, and most of the annual precipitation falls between October and April, with a dry season from May through September. This summer drought is especially pronounced in July and August, which together occupy 17% of a year but on average receive only 2% of the annual precipitation. Light snowfall occurs in winter, but major snows are rare. Mostly cloudy skies and low cloud ceilings are commonplace during the rainy season.

Salem's mean annual temperature is 54.1 °F (12.3 °C); its annual precipitation is 40.08 inches (1,018 mm), with an average 3.5 inches (8.9 cm) of snow included. However, over a quarter of years receive no snowfall. The state capital is about 47 mi (76 km) south of Portland, but actually has a lower average temperature than that of Portland (54.4 °F or 12.4 °C), due in part to the lower daily minima.

All-time extremes in Salem range from 117 to −12 °F (47 to −24 °C). The coldest afternoon of the year usually falls to 32 °F (0 °C) on the freezing point, whereas the coldest recorded maximum temperature was 16 °F (−9 °C) in three separate months and years. The warmest night on record was 74 °F (23 °C) in July 2006 and the warmest annual night averages 64 °F (18 °C).

Climate data for Salem, Oregon (McNary Field), 1991–2020 normals, extremes 1893–present
Month	Jan	Feb	Mar	Apr	May	Jun	Jul	Aug	Sep	Oct	Nov	Dec	Year
Record high °F (°C)	68 (20)	72 (22)	80 (27)	93 (34)	100 (38)	117 (47)	108 (42)	108 (42)	104 (40)	93 (34)	74 (23)	72 (22)	117 (47)
Mean maximum °F (°C)	59.4 (15.2)	61.9 (16.6)	70.3 (21.3)	77.6 (25.3)	87.3 (30.7)	93.8 (34.3)	100.1 (37.8)	100.4 (38.0)	92.6 (33.7)	77.8 (25.4)	64.1 (17.8)	59.0 (15.0)	103.2 (39.6)
Mean daily maximum °F (°C)	48.4 (9.1)	52.1 (11.2)	56.8 (13.8)	61.6 (16.4)	69.0 (20.6)	74.6 (23.7)	83.5 (28.6)	83.6 (28.7)	77.5 (25.3)	64.8 (18.2)	53.6 (12.0)	47.4 (8.6)	64.4 (18.0)
Daily mean °F (°C)	42.1 (5.6)	44.0 (6.7)	47.5 (8.6)	51.3 (10.7)	57.7 (14.3)	62.7 (17.1)	69.3 (20.7)	69.2 (20.7)	64.0 (17.8)	54.3 (12.4)	46.3 (7.9)	41.3 (5.2)	54.1 (12.3)
Mean daily minimum °F (°C)	35.8 (2.1)	35.9 (2.2)	38.3 (3.5)	41.0 (5.0)	46.3 (7.9)	50.8 (10.4)	55.1 (12.8)	54.8 (12.7)	50.6 (10.3)	43.9 (6.6)	39.0 (3.9)	35.1 (1.7)	43.9 (6.6)
Mean minimum °F (°C)	23.9 (−4.5)	24.1 (−4.4)	27.7 (−2.4)	31.1 (−0.5)	35.2 (1.8)	41.5 (5.3)	47.0 (8.3)	46.7 (8.2)	41.0 (5.0)	32.1 (0.1)	26.3 (−3.2)	21.8 (−5.7)	17.7 (−7.9)
Record low °F (°C)	−10 (−23)	−4 (−20)	12 (−11)	23 (−5)	25 (−4)	32 (0)	35 (2)	30 (−1)	26 (−3)	19 (−7)	9 (−13)	−12 (−24)	−12 (−24)
Average precipitation inches (mm)	6.08 (154)	4.54 (115)	4.35 (110)	3.12 (79)	2.25 (57)	1.25 (32)	0.25 (6.4)	0.39 (9.9)	1.46 (37)	3.47 (88)	5.95 (151)	6.97 (177)	40.08 (1,018)
Average precipitation days (≥ 0.01 in)	18.2	15.9	17.5	15.7	11.6	8.0	2.3	3.2	6.4	12.5	17.7	18.9	147.9
Average relative humidity (%)	82.9	81.5	77.3	73.6	71.1	67.8	63.0	64.3	69.4	79.5	84.8	84.9	75.0
Average dew point °F (°C)	34.3 (1.3)	36.9 (2.7)	38.1 (3.4)	40.3 (4.6)	44.8 (7.1)	49.3 (9.6)	51.4 (10.8)	52.0 (11.1)	48.9 (9.4)	45.0 (7.2)	40.5 (4.7)	35.6 (2.0)	43.1 (6.2)
Mean monthly sunshine hours	77.6	117.9	200.3	238.1	281.7	295.2	350.3	318.8	253.1	171.0	86.2	73.5	2,463.7
Source: NOAA (sun, dew points and relative humidity 1961–1990)

See or edit raw graph data.

== Demographics ==
Historical population
Census	Pop.	Note	%±
1860	902		—
1870	2,139		137.1%
1880	2,538		18.7%
1890	3,422		34.8%
1900	4,258		24.4%
1910	14,094		231.0%
1920	17,679		25.4%
1930	26,266		48.6%
1940	30,908		17.7%
1950	43,140		39.6%
1960	49,142		13.9%
1970	68,296		39.0%
1980	89,233		30.7%
1990	107,786		20.8%
2000	136,924		27.0%
2010	154,637		12.9%
2020	175,535		13.5%
2024 (est.)	180,406		2.8%
U.S. Decennial Census; 2020 Census

According to realtor website Zillow, the average price of a home as of July 31, 2025, in Salem is $437,062.

As of the 2023 American Community Survey, there are 68,817 estimated households in Salem with an average of 2.46 persons per household. The city has a median household income of $72,827. Approximately 14.6% of the city's population lives at or below the poverty line. Salem has an estimated 63.6% employment rate, with 31.5% of the population holding a bachelor's degree or higher and 88.0% holding a high school diploma.

The top five reported languages (people were allowed to report up to two languages, thus the figures will generally add to more than 100%) were English (76.7%), Spanish (18.5%), Indo-European (1.6%), Asian and Pacific Islander (3.0%), and Other (0.2%).

=== Racial and ethnic composition ===
Salem, Oregon – racial and ethnic composition Note: the US Census treats Hispanic/Latino as an ethnic category. This table excludes Latinos from the racial categories and assigns them to a separate category. Hispanics/Latinos may be of any race.
Race / ethnicity (NH = non-Hispanic)	Pop. 1990	Pop. 2000	Pop. 2010	Pop. 2020	% 1990	% 2000	% 2010	% 2020
White alone (NH)	95,484	106,331	109,352	111,430	88.59%	77.66%	70.72%	63.48%
Black or African American alone (NH)	1,572	1,621	2,081	2,812	1.46%	1.18%	1.35%	1.60%
Native American or Alaska Native alone (NH)	1,580	1,692	1,750	1,776	1.47%	1.24%	1.13%	1.01%
Asian alone (NH)	2,482	3,268	4,134	5,446	2.30%	2.39%	2.67%	3.10%
Pacific Islander alone (NH)	—	617	1,429	2,293	—	0.45%	0.92%	1.31%
Other race alone (NH)	80	195	214	838	0.07%	0.14%	0.14%	0.48%
Mixed-race or multiracial (NH)	—	3,227	4,318	9,638	—	2.36%	2.79%	5.49%
Hispanic or Latino (any race)	6,588	19,973	31,359	41,302	6.11%	14.59%	20.28%	23.53%
Total	107,786	136,924	154,637	175,535	100.00%	100.00%	100.00%	100.00%

=== 2020 census ===
As of the 2020 census, Salem had a population of 175,535, 64,289 households, and 41,287 families. The median age was 36.3 years; 23.0% of residents were under the age of 18, 6.2% were under five, and 15.8% were 65 years of age or older. For every 100 females there were 99.6 males, and for every 100 females age 18 and over there were 97.8 males age 18 and over.

99.9% of residents lived in urban areas, while 0.1% lived in rural areas.

There were 64,289 households, of which 31.8% had children under the age of 18 living in them, 44.4% were married-couple households, 17.7% were households with a male householder and no spouse or partner present, and 29.0% were households with a female householder and no spouse or partner present. About 27.2% of all households were made up of individuals and 12.0% had someone living alone who was 65 years of age or older.

There were 67,411 housing units, of which 4.6% were vacant. Among occupied housing units, 55.4% were owner-occupied and 44.6% were renter-occupied. The homeowner vacancy rate was 1.2% and the rental vacancy rate was 4.9%.

Racial composition as of the 2020 census
Race	Number	Percent
White	121,266	69.1%
Black or African American	3,049	1.7%
American Indian and Alaska Native	2,924	1.7%
Asian	5,598	3.2%
Native Hawaiian and Other Pacific Islander	2,373	1.4%
Some other race	19,141	10.9%
Two or more races	21,184	12.1%
Hispanic or Latino (of any race)	41,302	23.5%

=== 2010 census ===
As of the 2010 census, there were 154,637 people, 57,290 households, and 36,261 families residing in the city. The population density was 3,228.3 inhabitants per square mile (1,246.5/km^{2}). There were 61,276 housing units at an average density of 1,279.2 per square mile (493.9/km^{2}). The racial makeup of the city was 79.03% White, 1.48% African American, 1.48% Native American, 2.73% Asian, 0.94% Pacific Islander, 10.05% from some other races and 4.29% from two or more races. Hispanic or Latino people of any race were 20.28% of the population.

There were 57,290 households, of which 33.8% had children under the age of 18 living with them, 45.0% were married couples living together, 13.0% had a female householder with no husband present, 5.2% had a male householder with no wife present, and 36.7% were non-families. 28.8% of all households were made up of individuals, and 10.4% had someone living alone who was 65 years of age or older. The average household size was 2.55 and the average family size was 3.15.

The median age in the city was 34.5 years. 25.2% of residents were under the age of 18; 10.8% were between the ages of 18 and 24; 27.6% were from 25 to 44; 24.5% were from 45 to 64; and 12% were 65 years of age or older. The gender makeup of the city was 49.9% male and 50.1% female.

=== 2000 census ===
As of the 2000 census, there were 136,924 people, 50,676 households, and 32,331 families residing in the city. The population density was 2,994.0 inhabitants per square mile (1,156.0/km^{2}). There were 53,817 housing units at an average density of 1,176.8 per square mile (454.4/km^{2}). The racial makeup of the city was 83.07% White, 1.28% African American, 1.51% Native American, 2.41% Asian, 0.47% Pacific Islander, 7.90% from some other races and 3.36% from two or more races. Hispanic or Latino people of any race were 14.59% of the population.

There were 50,676 households, of which 32.4% had children under the age of 18 living with them, 47.7% were married couples living together, 11.6% had a female householder with no husband present, and 36.2% were non-families. 28.3% of all households were made up of individuals and 10.5% had someone living alone who was 65 years of age or older. The average household size was 2.53 and the average family size was 3.10.

In the city the population was spread out with 25.4% under the age of 18, 11.4% from 18 to 24, 30.1% from 25 to 44, 20.6% from 45 to 64, and 12.4% who were 65 years of age or older. The median age was 34 years. For every 100 females there were 100.9 males. For every 100 females age 18 and over, there were 99.5 males.

The median income for a household in the city was $38,881, and the median income for a family was $46,409. Males had a median income of $34,746 versus $26,789 for females. The per capita income for the city was $19,141. About 10.5% of families and 15.0% of the population were below the poverty line, including 20.2% of those under age 18 and 7.1% of those age 65 or over.

== Government ==
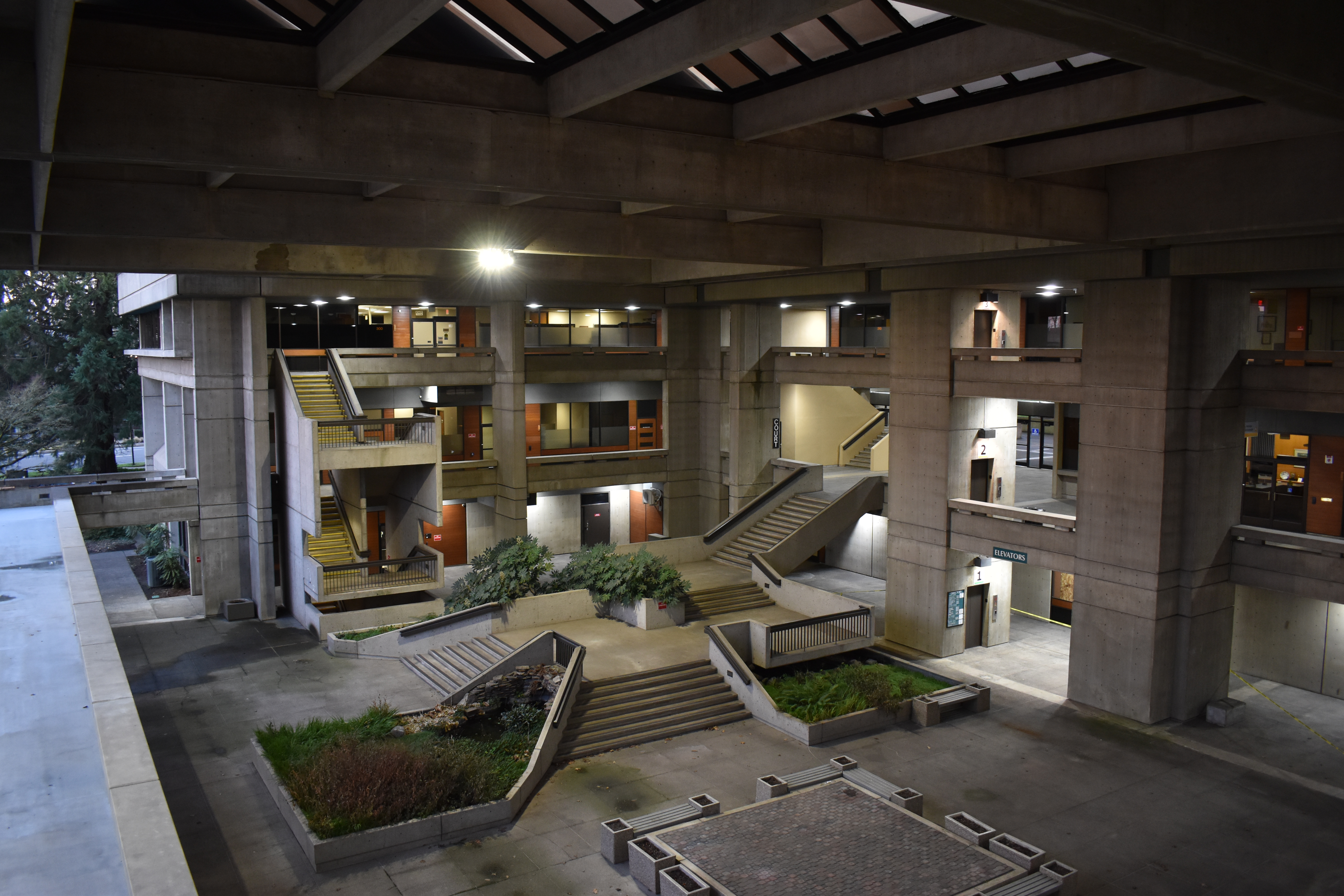
The covered courtyard which is part of the Vern W. Miller Civic Center, which is a complex of buildings, including a branch of the public library, a fire station, city hall, and the police department (until 2020.)

Salem is governed using the council–manager government model. The city council consists of eight members who are elected from single member wards. The mayor is elected in a citywide vote.

The current mayor is Julie Hoy, who took office in 2025.

The following are Salem's city councilors:

- Ward 1: Paul Tigan
- Ward 2: Linda Nishioka
- Ward 3: Shane Matthews
- Ward 4: Deanna Gwyn
- Ward 5: Dr. Irvin M. Brown
- Ward 6: Mai Vang
- Ward 7: Vanessa Nordyke
- Ward 8: Micki Varney

== Economy ==
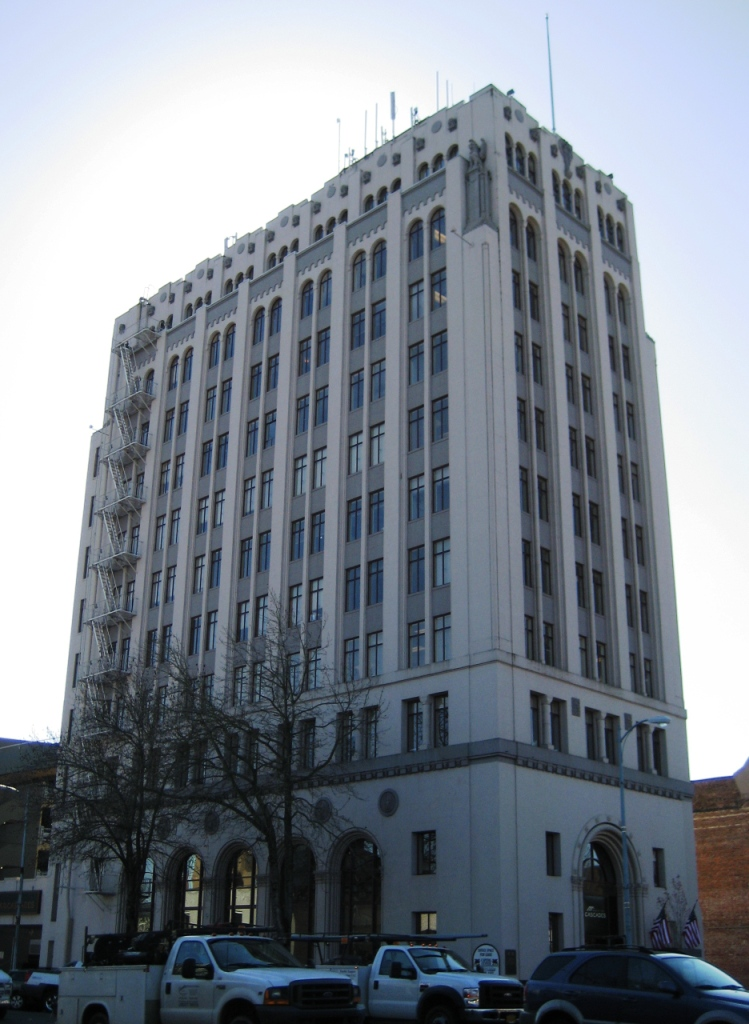
Capitol Center in downtown

State government is Salem's largest employer, but the city also serves as a hub for the area farming communities and is a major agricultural food processing center. It lies along the I-5 corridor and is within an hour's drive of Oregon's largest city, Portland.

Salem is the home of Kettle Foods, Inc., a maker of potato chips since 1982. Kettle employs 700 in Salem and at a plant in Bowthorpe, England. NORPAC Foods, Inc., is a large food processor in Salem and elsewhere in Marion County. Its brands include Flav-R-Pac and West-Pac frozen fruits and vegetables, and Santiam canned vegetables. Oregon Fruit Products, Inc., has been canning blackberries, marionberries and other fruits in Salem since 1935, with Oregon as its brand name.

In a bid to diversify its economic base, Salem attracted a number of computer-related manufacturing plants in the 1990s. In November 2003, the Sumitomo Mitsubishi Silicon Group (SUMCO), one of these arrivals, announced it would be closing its two silicon wafer plants at the end of 2004, eliminating 620 jobs, and moving production to other plants.

Salem is the headquarters of the Oregon Department of Corrections and home to four state correctional facilities, including the Oregon State Penitentiary, Oregon's only maximum-security prison.

Numerous projects are underway to increase the supply of housing in the downtown core. These projects will provide upscale, low- and high-rise condominium and office space.

=== Top employers ===
According to the city's 2024 Annual Comprehensive Financial Report, the largest employers in the city are:

Number	Employer	Number of employees	Percentage
1	State of Oregon	23,500	26.69%
2	Salem Hospital	5,829	6.62%
3	Salem-Keizer School District 24J	3,499	3.97%
4	Marion County	1,804	2.05%
5	Federal Government	1,600	1.82%
6	City of Salem	1,323	1.50%
7	Chemeketa Community College	1,141	1.30%
8	Walmart	1,050	1.19%
9	Amazon Fulfillment Center	1,000	1.14%
10	State Accident Insurance Fund (SAIF)	985	1.12%
—	Total	41,731	47.40%

== People and culture ==
=== Neighborhood associations ===
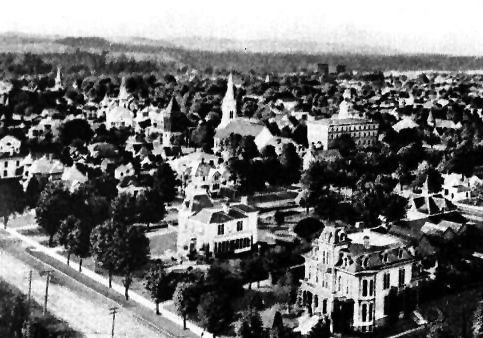
Central area of Salem 1900

Salem has 17 recognized neighborhood associations, which are independent groups that receive administrative support from the city.

- Central Area (CAN-DO)
- East Lancaster (ELNA)
- Faye Wright
- Grant
- Highland
- Morningside
- Northeast Salem (NESCA)
- North Lancaster (NOLA)
- Northeast Neighbors (NEN)
- Northgate
- South Central (SCAN)
- South Gateway
- Southeast Mill Creek (SEMCA)
- Southeast Salem (SESNA)
- Southwest Salem (SWAN)
- Sunnyslope
- West Salem

=== Cultural events and series ===
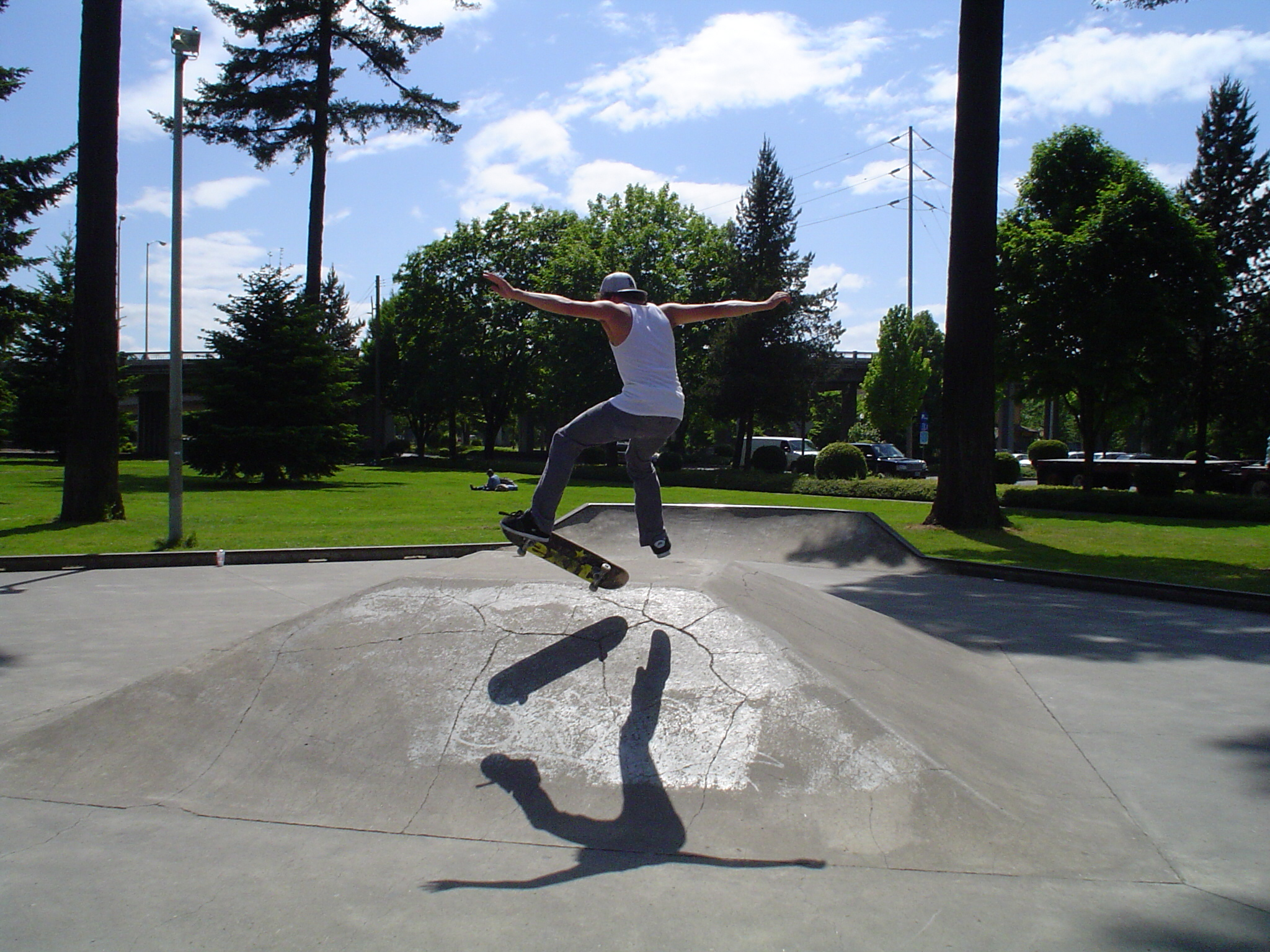
Skateboarder in Marion Square Park

The nonprofit group Salem Community Markets (SCM) operates several farmers' markets in Salem. The largest and most well-known of these is the Salem Saturday Market, which is located north of the Capitol, runs from May to October, and focuses on local products, including art, baked goods, produce, live plants, meat, and other items. Other SCM-run markets include a Monday Market (hosted from May to September at the Salem Hospital), a Wednesday Farmers' Market hosted on campus at Chemeketa Community College, a Thursday Market in West Salem, and a Holiday Gift Market in December. There is also an indoor Saturday Public Market which is open all year.

The annual World Beat Festival, held in June, is sponsored by the nonprofit Salem Multicultural Institute. The event lasts for two days and is held at the Riverfront Park. It features international crafts, music, dance, food, and folklore from every continent, and in recent years has held a Dragon Boat race similar to the ones held during the nearby Rose Festival in Portland.

The Salem Art Association sponsors the annual Salem Art Fair and Festival, which takes place at Bush's Pasture Park during the summer. Its displays, interactive exhibits, food, and performances attract thousands of visitors each year.

The Bite of Salem, held in July at the Riverfront Park, is an event similar to others such as the Bite of Oregon in Portland. The event consists of a weekend of local restaurants in Salem offering samples of their menus to patrons in a festival atmosphere, with live entertainment and benefiting local charities. In the summer, Chef's Nite Out is a wine and food benefit held for Marion-Polk Food Share. Oregon Wine & Food Festival takes place at that state's fairgrounds in January.

The largest event in Salem is the Oregon State Fair at the end of August through Labor Day. Located in the Oregon State Fairgrounds in North Salem, the fair offers exhibits, competitions and carnival rides. Other events such as concerts, horse shows and rodeos take place at the Oregon State Fair and Expo Center throughout the year.

The Mid-Valley Video Festival offers local, national and international independent films in theaters throughout the city.

The Salem Film Festival has included feature films that were Oregon premieres.

The Salem Repertory Theatre presents shows at the Reed Opera House. The Pentacle Theatre, which features plays and musicals, is located in West Salem. The Elsinore Theatre is a historic landmark featuring recitals, concerts, films, and plays. It has the largest working pipe organ on the west coast, a remnant of its days as a showcase for silent films, in the early days of cinema. Grand Theater is newly renovated and is the home of Enlightened Theatrics, a professional theatre company and hosts the Salem Progressive Film Series on the third Tuesday nine months of the year.

Salem Capital Pride, Salem's yearly Gay Pride Event, is held in early August.

The personal house and garden of landscape architects Elizabeth Lord and Edith Schryver, known as Gaiety Hollow, is on the National Register of Historic Places. Their firm Lord & Schryver designed the gardens of Historic Deepwood Estate.

=== Museums and other points of interest ===
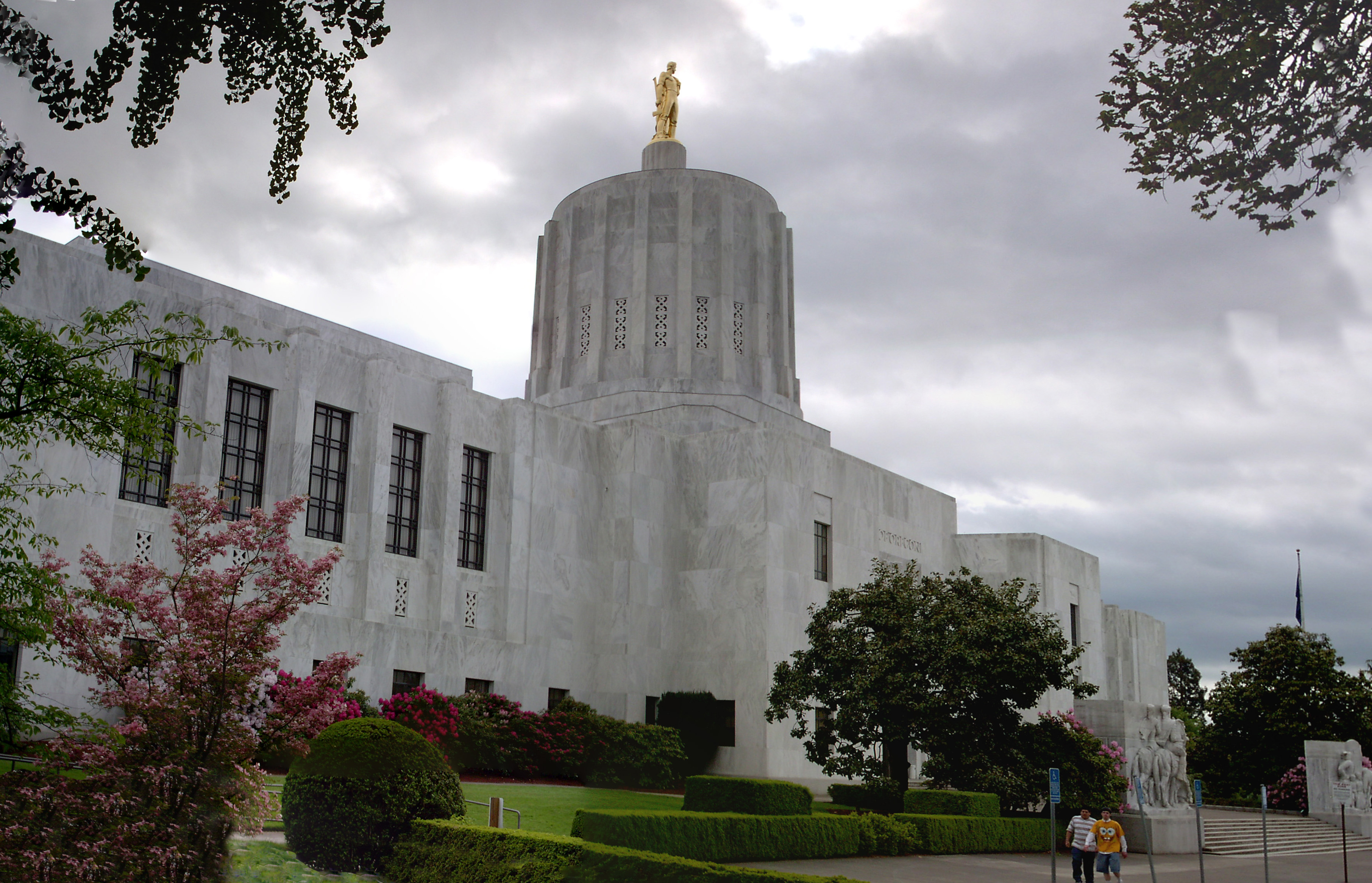
Oregon State Capitol

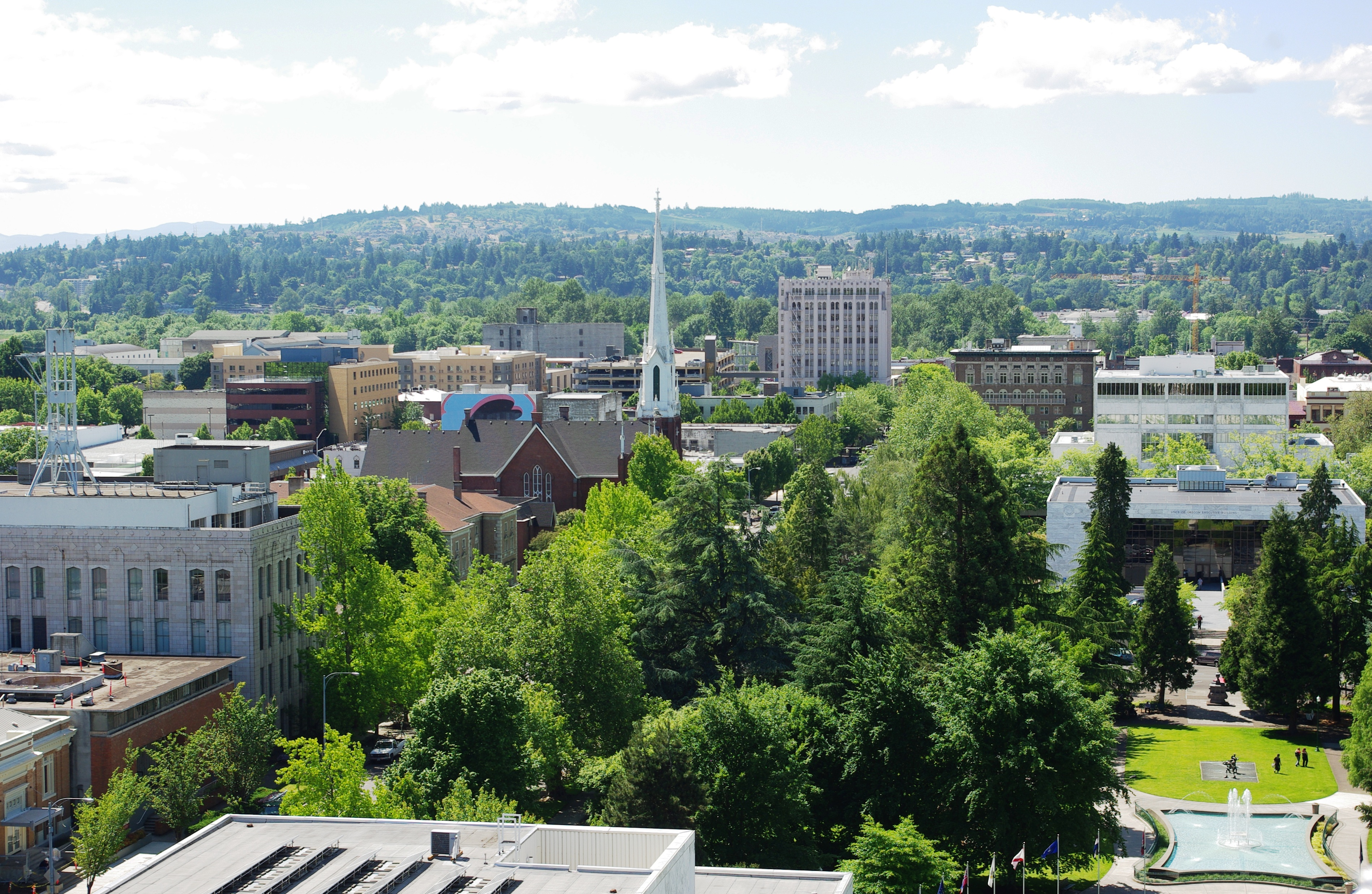
Downtown Salem looking west

In addition to the Oregon State Capitol and adjacent Willson Park, Salem's downtown contains the Willamette Heritage Center, Hallie Ford Museum of Art, the Elsinore Theatre, Riverfront Park, the Willamette River, some of the oldest buildings in Oregon, as well as shopping and restaurants. The A.C. Gilbert's Discovery Village interactive children's museum and Prewitt-Allen Archaeological Museum are both also located in Salem.

The two leading candidates for the tallest building in Salem are Salem First United Methodist Church and the Capitol Center. A private survey commissioned by a local publication holds that the church is the tallest. The tall white spire of the 1878 church rises at the intersection of Church and State Streets across from the Capitol grounds. The Capitol Center (originally the First National Bank Building, then the Livesley Building) was built in 1927 by former Salem mayor Thomas A. Livesley, a prominent Salem-area businessman and civic leader. At that time of its completion, it was the tallest commercial building in the state.

In 1988, Livesley's family home was purchased through private donations and was donated to the state. It now serves as the official residence of the Governor and family. Now known as Mahonia Hall, it was placed on the National Register of Historic Places (NRHP) in 1990.

The Oregon Symphony, based in Portland, presents approximately ten classical and pops concerts each year in Salem. The Salem Chamber Orchestra includes professional area musicians as well as students. The Salem Armory Auditorium has hosted touring bands including Korn and Phish.

The Salem Concert Band is a community band made up of professional and amateur musicians that performs several classical and pops concerts annually.

Because Salem is the state capital, it has a multitude of government agencies, departments, and boards housed in buildings with architectural designs ranging from the early 20th century to examples of state-of-the-art civil building design.

The historic Reed Opera House in downtown Salem has a number of local shops and dining establishments, as well as an art gallery.

Salem has been awarded "Tree City USA" status by the National Arbor Day Foundation for 30 consecutive years for its dedication to urban forestry. Salem was the first city in Oregon to receive the award. In keeping with the city's "Cherry City" theme, flowering cherry trees have been planted along many Salem streets as well as on the Capitol Mall across from the Capitol.

The Salem Public Library's main branch is located just south of downtown. A branch library is located in West Salem (Polk County). The Library participates in the Chemeketa Cooperative Regional Library Service, so Salem Public Library cards are also valid in the member libraries in Yamhill, Polk, Marion, and parts of Linn County. In addition to the Salem Public Library, the Mark O. Hatfield Library at Willamette University is open to the public as well, although the hours are limited.

The film One Flew Over the Cuckoo's Nest was filmed at the Oregon State Hospital.

Salem and its environs have a multitude of wineries and vineyards that are open to the public.

== Media ==
Salem has one daily newspaper, the Gannett-owned Statesman Journal. The Capital Press, a weekly agricultural newspaper, is published in the city and is distributed throughout the West Coast. The monthly Salem Business Journal covers business and government. Salem Magazine, published quarterly, both in physical and digital (online) issues, focuses upon its people; its unique culture; and its downtown and surrounding neighborhood communities.

Northwest Television operates three television stations that have Salem transmitters: KWVT-LD, KSLM, and KPWC, which serve an area from Longview, Washington, to Eugene, Oregon. Two stations are licensed to Salem but operate out of Portland: KPXG-TV and KRCW.

As of 2012, seven radio stations broadcast from Salem, including three commercial AM stations, three non-commercial FM stations, and a community radio station. KBZY was a popular Top 40 station from its sign-on in 1957 through the 1960s and 1970s. Today, KBZY has an oldies format; it continues to use live and local personalities. KBZY is affiliated with the ABC Radio Network. KYKN carries syndicated conservative talk hosts. KZGD is a Spanish language sports talk station. KSLM features conservative talk programming. KAIS is a non-commercial station licensed to Educational Media Foundation with a Contemporary Christian format. KMUZ, established in 2012, is a non-commercial community radio station carrying locally produced content in a variety format.

Salem is part of the Portland Arbitron survey area for radio stations, and most of the Portland stations can be received in Salem, including powerful AM stations news/talk KEX, CBS Sports Radio affiliate KXTG, and Fox Sports Radio affiliate KPOJ. Stations to the south in Corvallis and Albany are also easily heard in Salem.

NPR programming is carried by Oregon Public Broadcasting, which can be heard on KOPB-FM from Portland, and KOAC from Corvallis.

== Parks and recreation ==
=== City parks ===
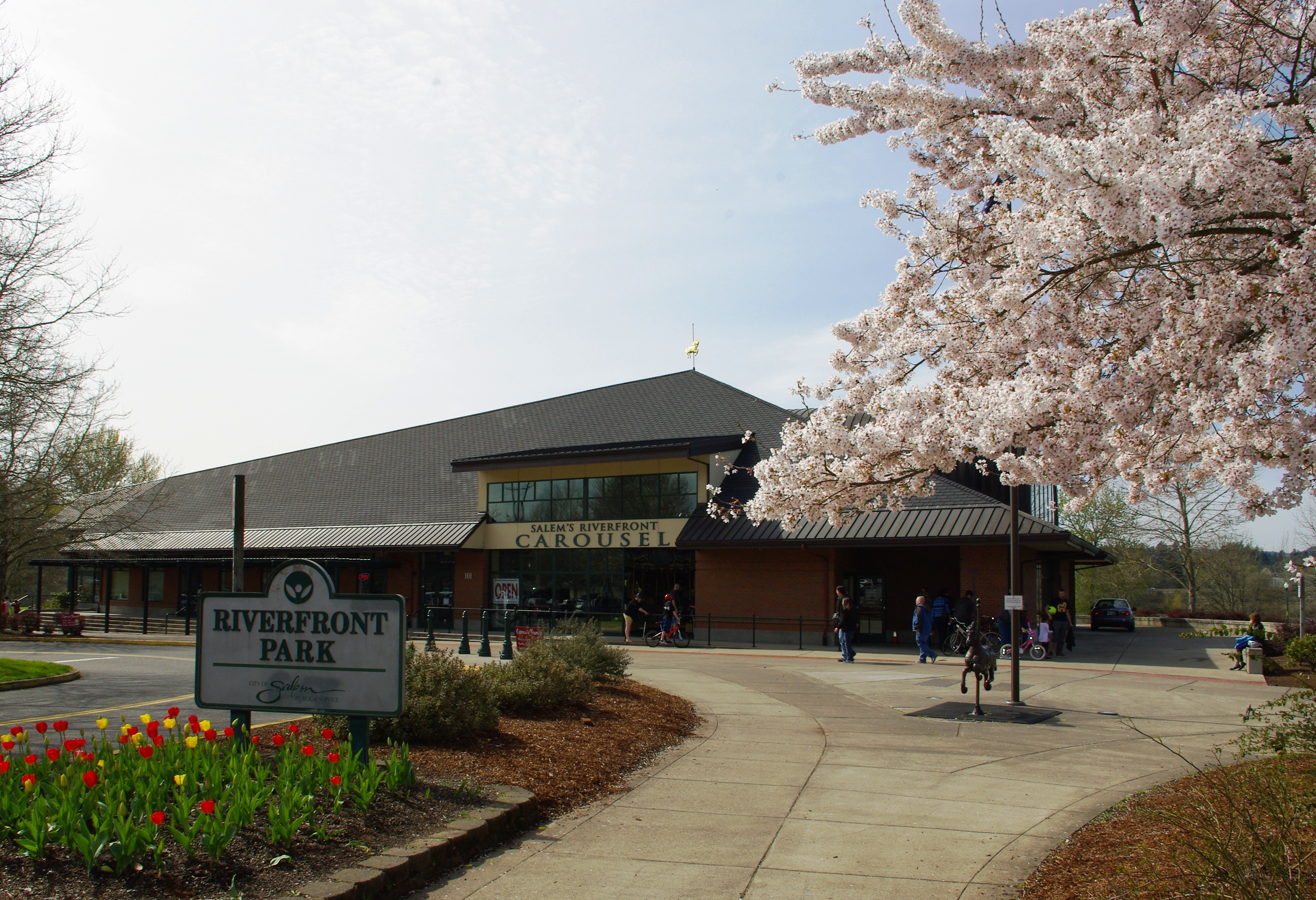
Riverfront Park in downtown

Salem's Public Works Department, Parks Operations Division, is responsible for a park system encompassing 2,338 acres (946 ha) with 29.53 miles (47.52 km) of trails, 46 parks, and another 55 open and undeveloped areas.

Minto-Brown Island Park is the largest at 1,200 acres (490 ha). In 2018, the Peter Courtney pedestrian and bicycle bridge was completed, connecting Minto-Brown with the 23-acre (9.3 ha) Riverfront Park, located across the Willamette River adjacent to downtown. Riverfront Park is also home to the Salem Carousel.

Bush's Pasture Park, a 90.5-acre (36.6 ha) urban park a few blocks south of downtown Salem, features natural groves of native Oregon White Oak trees, the historic Bush House, a rose garden, and adjacent Deepwood Estates.

Other city parks include 101-acre (41 ha) Cascade Gateway Park and Marion Square Park, which is located downtown next to Marion Street Bridge and has a skatepark and basketball court. The skatepark also allows bicycles. In December 2025, a larger skatepark (over 22,000 sq. ft.)was opened in the greater Geer Park. Marion Square Park was laid out by city founder William H. Willson, and is the next oldest municipal park in Salem after Willson Park at the Oregon State Capitol.

Across the Willamette River in West Salem is the 114-acre (46 ha) Wallace Marine Park, which includes a boat ramp and floating boat dock allowing easy access to the river for water sports. The NRHP-listed Union Street Railroad Bridge, repurposed as a bicycle and pedestrian bridge, connects Wallace Marine Park and West Salem to Riverfront Park and downtown Salem.

Salem is also home to one of the smallest city parks in the world, Waldo Park, which consists of a single Sequoia tree. Significant numbers of old growth trees exist throughout the city. These native remnant trees can be found in Bush Park, Fir Crest Park, and Woodmansee Park.

The capitol grounds, which are maintained by the Oregon Parks and Recreation Department, cover three city blocks and include Willson and Capitol parks.

=== Recreation ===
Other large parks located in the Salem area include the 1,680-acre (680 ha) Willamette Mission State Park north of the city, and Silver Falls State Park east of Salem. Both of these parks have extensive hiking, biking, and horse trails.

Salem's central location provides access to a wide variety of recreational activities in a variety of climates and geographies year round. The Coast Range and the Pacific Ocean are to the west. The Santiam Canyon area, the Western Cascades and the High Cascades are to the east. Portland and its environs are to the north, while Eugene and its environs are to the south.

Salem also has two disc golf courses. A nine-hole course located in the woods of Woodmansee Park (located behind Judson Middle School), and a more open style 18-hole course located throughout Cascade Gateway Park. They are both free and open to the public.

=== Sports ===
Sport	League	Team
Baseball	Mavericks Independent Baseball League	Salem-Keizer Volcanoes
Roller derby	WFTDA	Cherry City Roller Derby
Soccer	USL2	Capital FC
College athletics	NCAA Division III	Willamette Bearcats
College athletics	Cascade Collegiate Conference	Corban University
College athletics	Northwest Athletic Conference	Chemeketa Community College
Basketball	United States Basketball League	Salem Capitals
Arena football	Arena Football League	Oregon Black Bears

== Education ==
=== Elementary and secondary ===
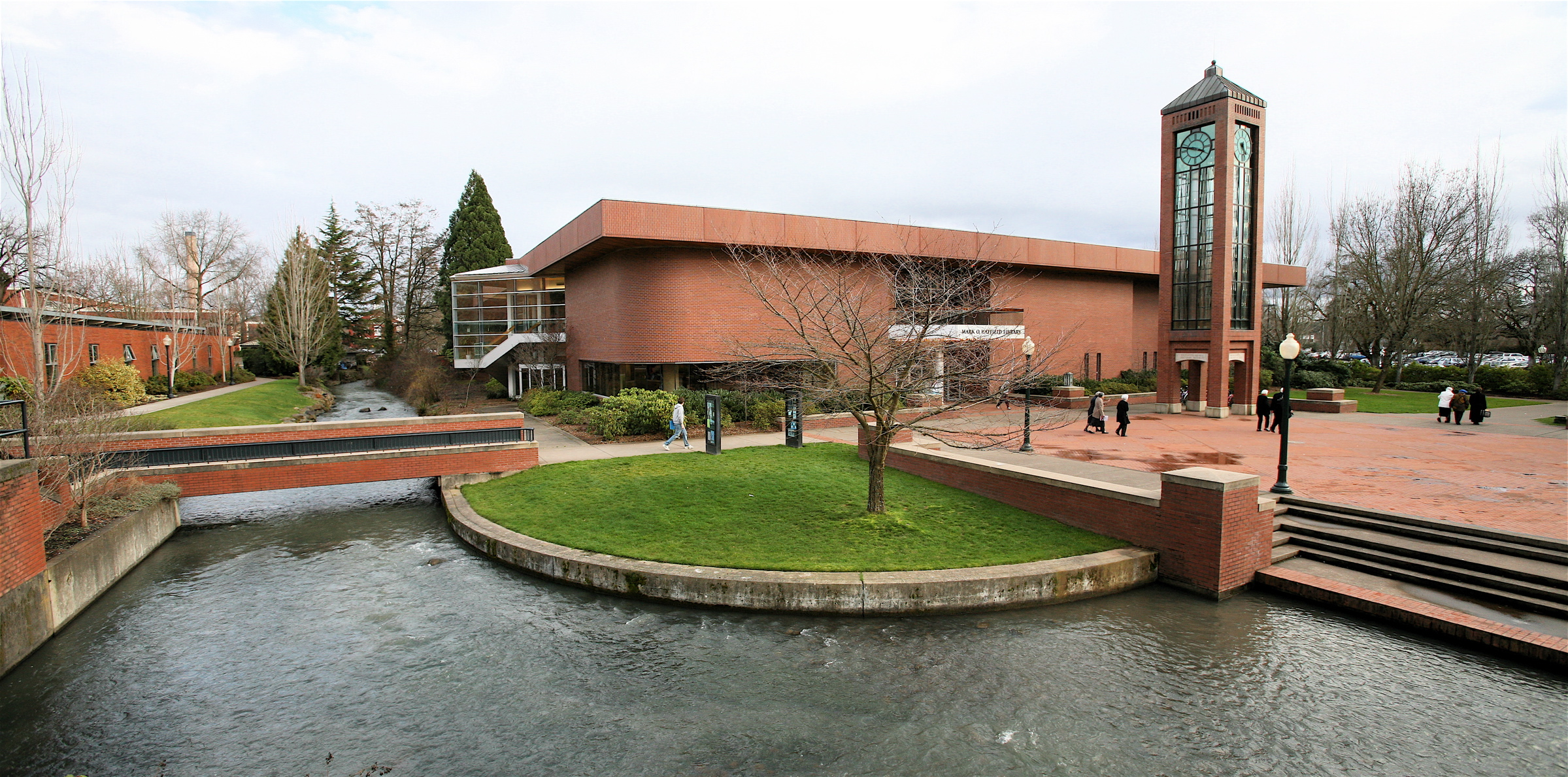
The Mark Hatfield Library and stream on the campus of Willamette University

Salem's public elementary and secondary schools are part of the Salem-Keizer School District, which includes almost all of the city limits. The Salem-Keizer district has approximately 39,000 students and is the second largest public school district in the state. A small section of Salem in Marion County is assigned to Cascade School District 5.

The city also has many private elementary and secondary schools such as Blanchet Catholic School and Salem Academy Christian. One school, Willamette Academy, is part of an outreach program run by Willamette University that is designed to expose under-represented students to the rewards of an academic life at an early age (7th–12th grade).

Salem is also home to several public boarding schools, the Chemawa Indian School (a Bureau of Indian Education (BIE)-affiliated Native American high school), and the Oregon School for the Deaf. Oregon School for the Blind was formerly in the city and closed in 2009.

=== Colleges and universities ===
Post secondary schools include Chemeketa Community College, Corban University, Tokyo International University of America, and Willamette University, the oldest university in the American west. Portland State University, Eastern Oregon University, Western Oregon University and Oregon State University provide classes and a handful of undergraduate degrees at Chemeketa Community College.

All of Marion County and all of Polk County are within the Chemeketa community college district.

== Infrastructure ==
=== Transportation ===
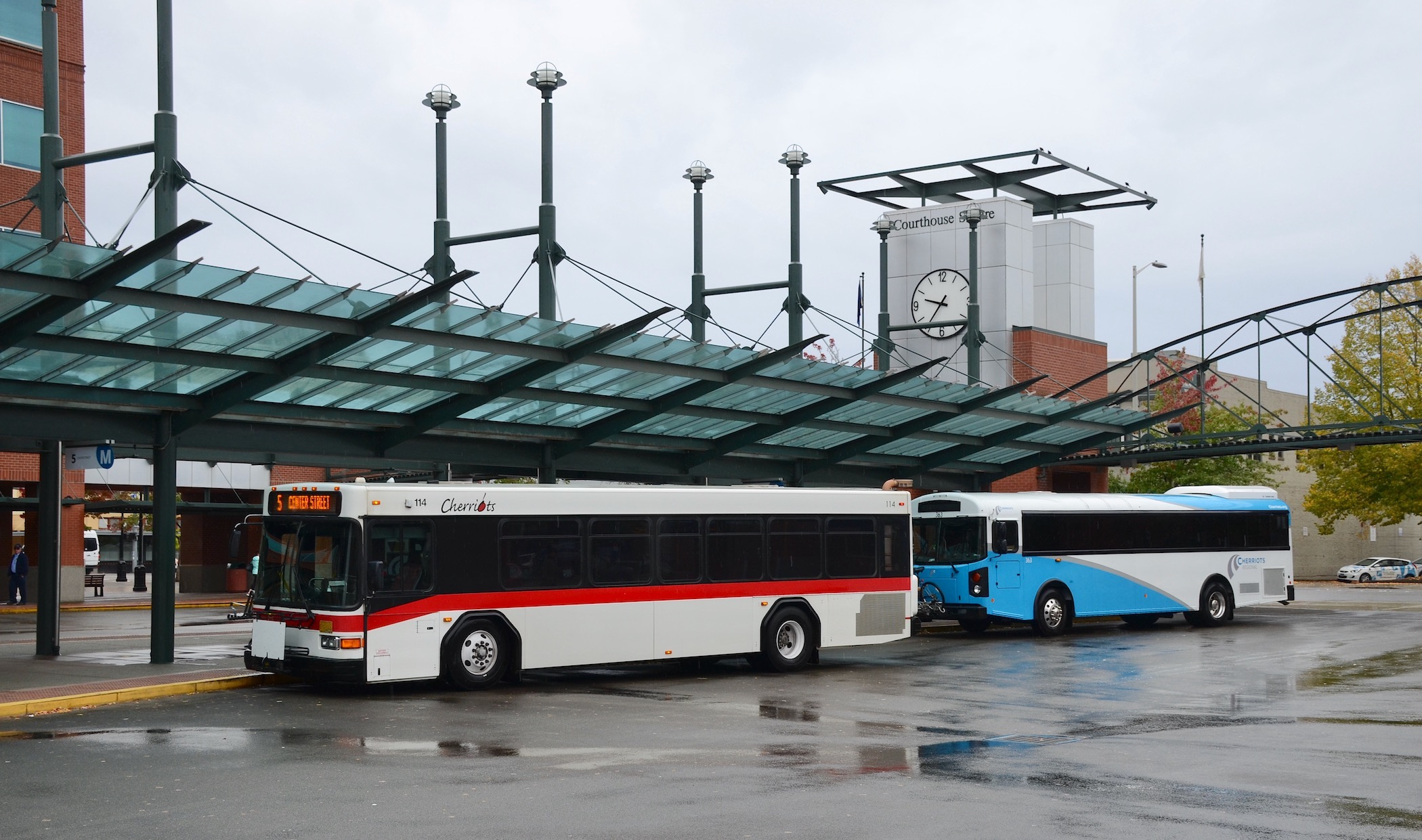
Buses at the Downtown Transit Center of Cherriots in 2018

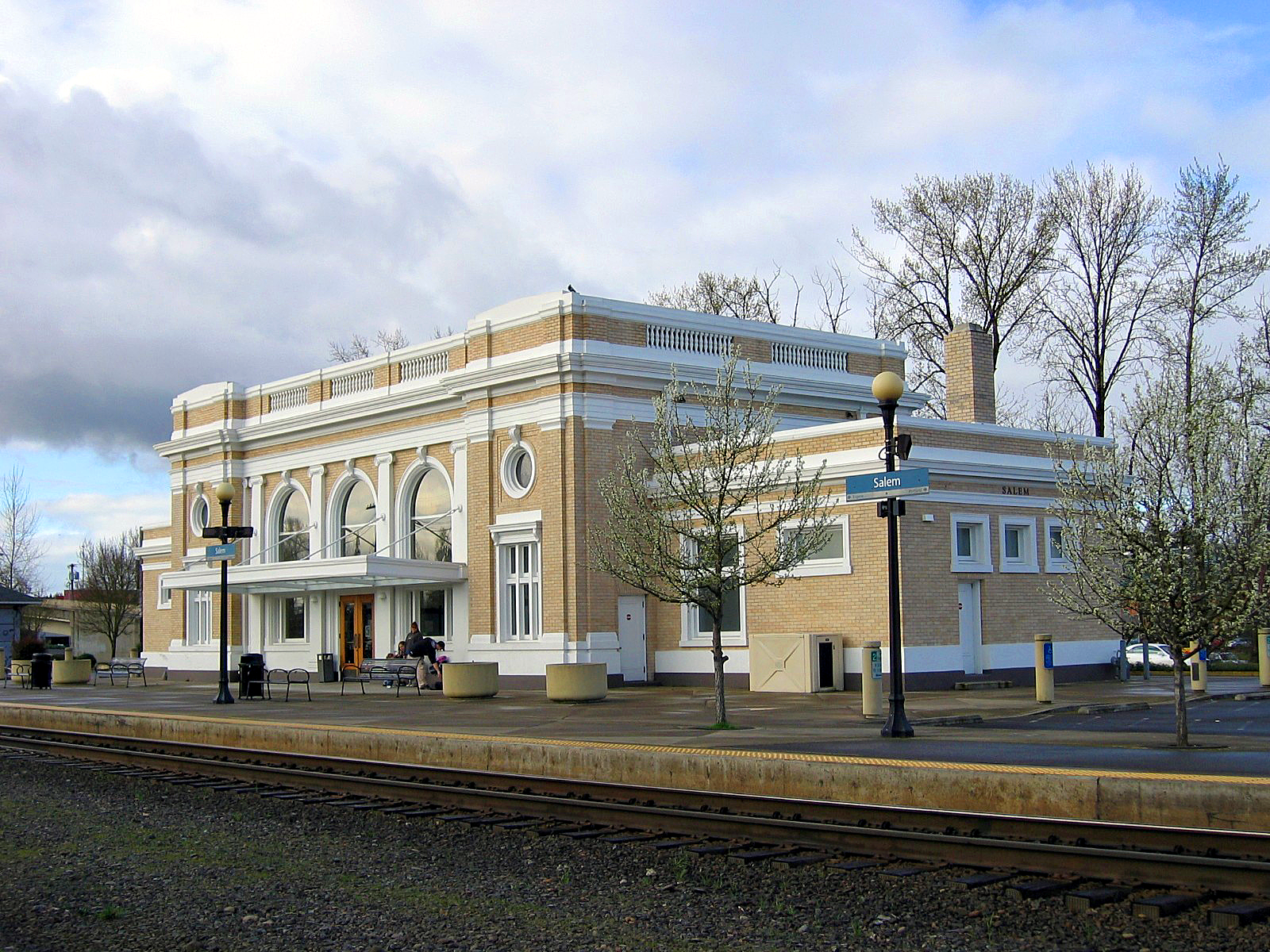
Built in 1918, Salem's passenger train depot serves Amtrak and Greyhound.

Cherriots, an independent government agency, provides fixed-route bus service, rideshare matching, and paratransit/lift services for the disabled, within the urban growth boundary. They also operate Cherriots Regional, previously known as Chemeketa Area Regional Transportation System (CARTS), which provides bus service that connects Salem to destinations as far north as Wilsonville, as far west as Dallas, and to the east to Silverton and up the Santiam Canyon to Mill City. Cherriots, in cooperation with Wilsonville's SMART, provides routes between downtown Salem and Wilsonville. From Wilsonville, WES Commuter Rail connects to TriMet routes in Beaverton, including MAX Light Rail.

Greyhound Lines provides north–south service and connecting carrier service to Bend, Oregon, from the Salem Amtrak station.

Amtrak, the national passenger rail system, leases the Salem Depot from the Oregon Department of Transportation. The Coast Starlight provides daily north–south service to cities between Los Angeles, California and Seattle, Washington. Amtrak Cascades trains, operating as far north as Vancouver, British Columbia and as far south as Eugene, Oregon, serve Salem several times daily in both directions.

HUT Airport Shuttle provides transportation to Portland International Airport. HUT also serves Corvallis with a second stop at Oregon State University, Albany, and Woodburn. Mountain Express provides transportation between Salem and Bend.

McNary Field (Salem-Willamette Valley Airport) is owned and operated by the City of Salem. It serves primarily general aviation and the Oregon National Guard – Army Aviation Support Facility (AASF). Delta Connection offered commercial air service with two daily flights to Salt Lake City, Utah, from July 2007. However, citing fuel costs versus a load factor of less than 85 percent, the service was discontinued in October 2008. The city plans to go forward with airport improvements that were announced when service was commenced, including a longer runway and an expanded terminal building. Avelo Airlines began service to Burbank, CA and Las Vegas, NV in early October 2023.

The city is served by the following highways:

- Interstate 5
- Oregon Route 99E
  - Oregon Route 99E Business is a spur of the above, serving the downtown area
- Oregon Route 22
- Oregon Route 221
- Oregon Route 51
- Oregon Route 213

=== Healthcare ===
Salem Hospital Regional Health Services, one of the largest of Oregon's 57 acute care hospitals, is a 454-bed acute care medical facility. It is a not-for-profit organization, and is also the city's largest private employer.

== Notable people ==
- Ryan Allen, football player for the Tennessee Titans
- George Andrews, mathematician
- Carlos Anguiano, soccer player
- Debbie Armstrong, gold medalist in skiing at the 1984 Winter Olympics
- Ryan Bailey, Olympic sprinter
- Cal Barnes, actor, director, screenwriter, film producer, novelist, and playwright
- Lute Barnes, baseball player
- Cliff Bentz, U.S. representative for Oregon
- Kat Bjelland, lead singer of the punk rock band Babes in Toyland
- Jerome Brudos, serial killer
- Gus Envela Jr., Olympic sprinter
- John Fahey, musician, author and founder of Takoma Records
- Jordan Farr, soccer player
- Pat Fitzsimons, PGA Tour golfer
- Ron Funches, standup comedian
- Thomas Leigh Gatch, vice admiral in the U.S. Navy
- Alfred Carlton Gilbert, inventor, athlete, toy-maker, and businessman; known for inventing the Erector Set and for winning an Olympic gold medal
- Craig Hanneman, NFL defensive lineman (1972–1975)
- Jon Heder, actor, filmmaker, and screenwriter
- Frank Herbert, author of Dune series; graduated from North Salem High School and employed by Statesman Journal
- Herbert Hoover, 31st president of the United States; worked in Salem in the 1880s
- Bob Horn, NFL linebacker (1976–1983)
- Cory Kendrix, musician
- Justin Kirk, actor
- Jed Lowrie, baseball player
- Donald G. Malarkey, former non-commissioned officer with Easy Company, 2nd Battalion, 506th Parachute Infantry Regiment, in the 101st Airborne Division of the U.S. Army during World War II
- Richard Laurence Marquette, serial killer
- Douglas McKay, mayor of Salem, state senator, governor of Oregon, and U.S. Secretary of the Interior
- Jennelle V. Moorhead, educator, president of National PTA from 1964 to 1967
- Larry Norman, Christian rock musician
- Thelma Payne, diver, 1920 Summer Olympics bronze medalist
- Ben Petrick, baseball player
- Joe Preston, bassist for several metal and rock bands
- Nathan Soltz, politician
- Leonard Stone, actor
- William L. Sullivan, author of outdoor guide books
- Kendra Sunderland, pornographic actress
- Bill Swancutt, football player
- Stephen Thorsett, professor and astronomer
- Michael Totten, journalist and novelist
- Zollie Volchok, former general manager of the Seattle SuperSonics and winner of the 1983 NBA Executive of the Year Award
- Evina Westbrook, WNBA player
- Randall Woodfield, murderer and suspected serial killer
- Dolora Zajick, opera singer

== Sister cities ==
Salem has three sister cities:

- Salem, Tamil Nadu, India
- Kawagoe, Saitama, Japan
- Gimhae, South Gyeongsang, South Korea

As of 2014, there was talk of reviving the now-stagnant Sister City project launched in 1964 with Salem in Tamil Nadu, India.

== See also ==
- USS Salem (CM-11)
- Madame Web—comic character born in Salem, known for appearances in Spider-Man
