= List of public art in Salem, Oregon =

List of public artworks in Salem, Oregon, U.S.

This is a list of public art in Salem, Oregon, U.S., including outdoor sculptures and memorials located throughout the city. Many of the works are situated on the grounds of the Oregon State Capitol.

== Outdoor sculptures ==
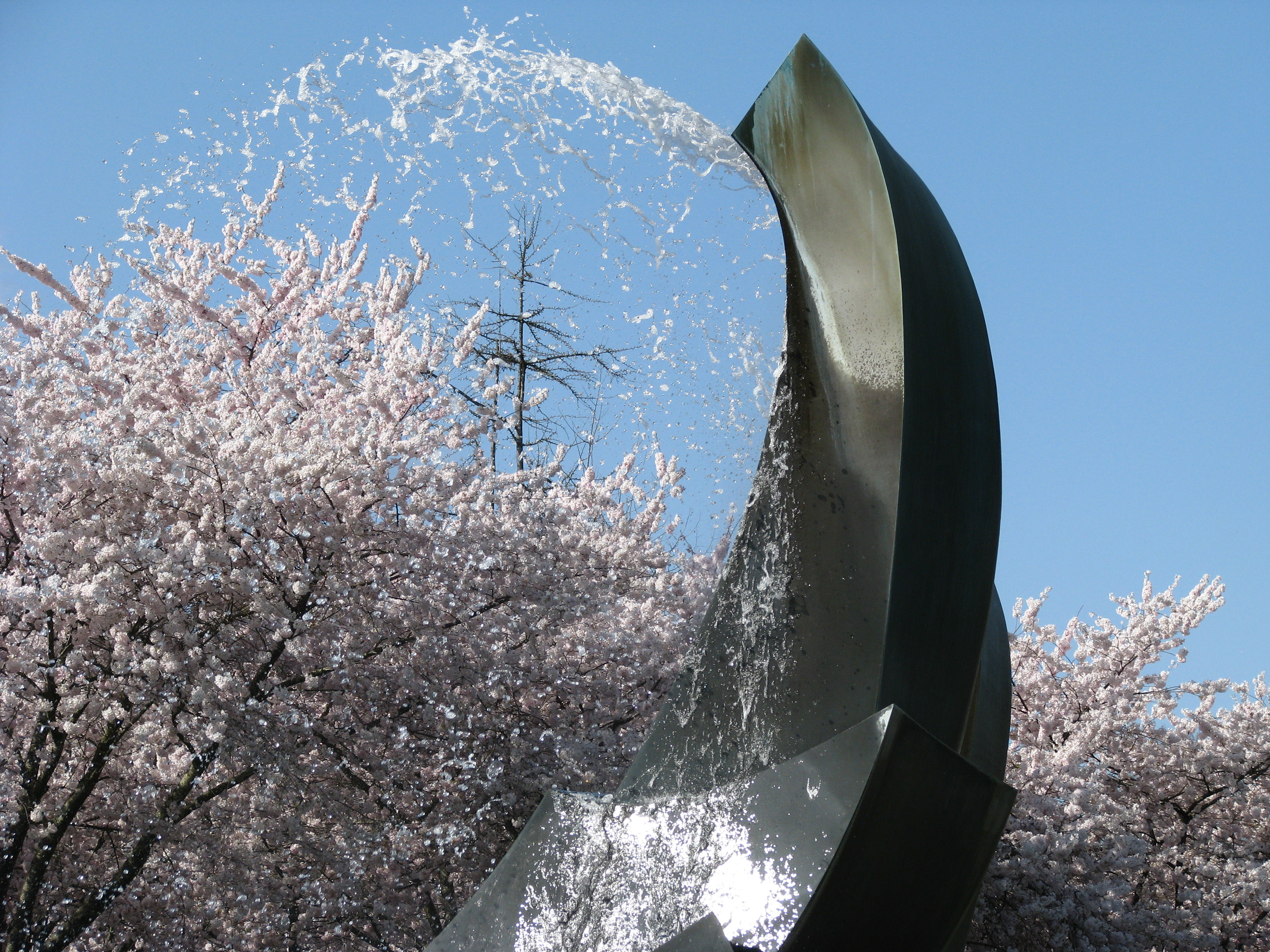
Sprague Fountain in 2010

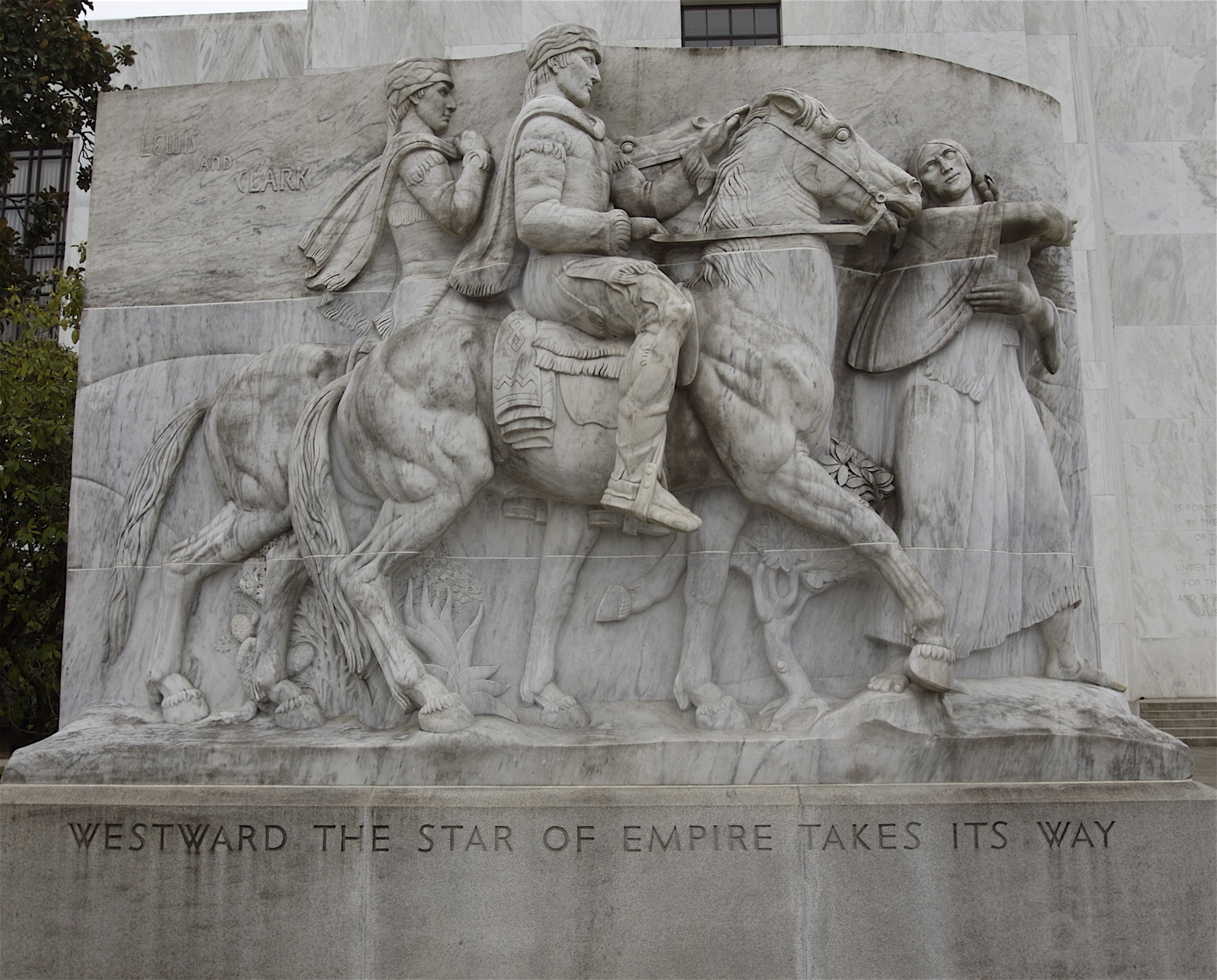
Lewis and Clark in 2008

- A Parade of Animals (1991), Oregon State Capitol
- Afghan–Iraqi Freedom Memorial (2006)
- Breyman Fountain (1904), Wilson Park, Oregon State Capitol
- Capitol Beaver Family (1985), Oregon State Capitol
- The Circuit Rider (1924), Oregon State Capitol
- Covered Wagon (1934), Oregon State Capitol
- Daughters of Union Veterans Civil War Memorial (1933), City View Cemetery
- Eco-Earth Globe (2003), Riverfront Park
- Grasshopper (1988)
- Hatfield Fountain (1989), Willamette University
- Statue of Jason Lee, Oregon State Capitol
- Korean War Memorial
- Lewis and Clark (1934), Oregon State Capitol
- Lady Justice, Truman Wesley Collins Legal Center
- Liberty Bell (1950), Oregon State Capitol
- Statue of John McLoughlin, Oregon State Capitol
- Medal of Honor Monument
- Oregon Pioneer, Oregon State Capitol
- Oregon Veterans Medal of Honor Memorial (2003), Oregon State Capitol
- Oregon World War II Memorial (2014), Oregon State Capitol
- Over the Top to Victory (1924)
- Sprague Fountain (1980), Oregon State Capitol
- To Scale the Scales of Justice (2010), Justice Building
- Tom McCall Memorial (2008), Riverfront Park
- Town and Gown (1991)
- Veterans of Foreign Wars Monument
- Waite Fountain (1912), Oregon State Capitol
- World War I Memorial (1954), Marion County Courthouse
