= Pondosa, Oregon =

Unincorporated community in the state of Oregon, United States

- Unincorporated community
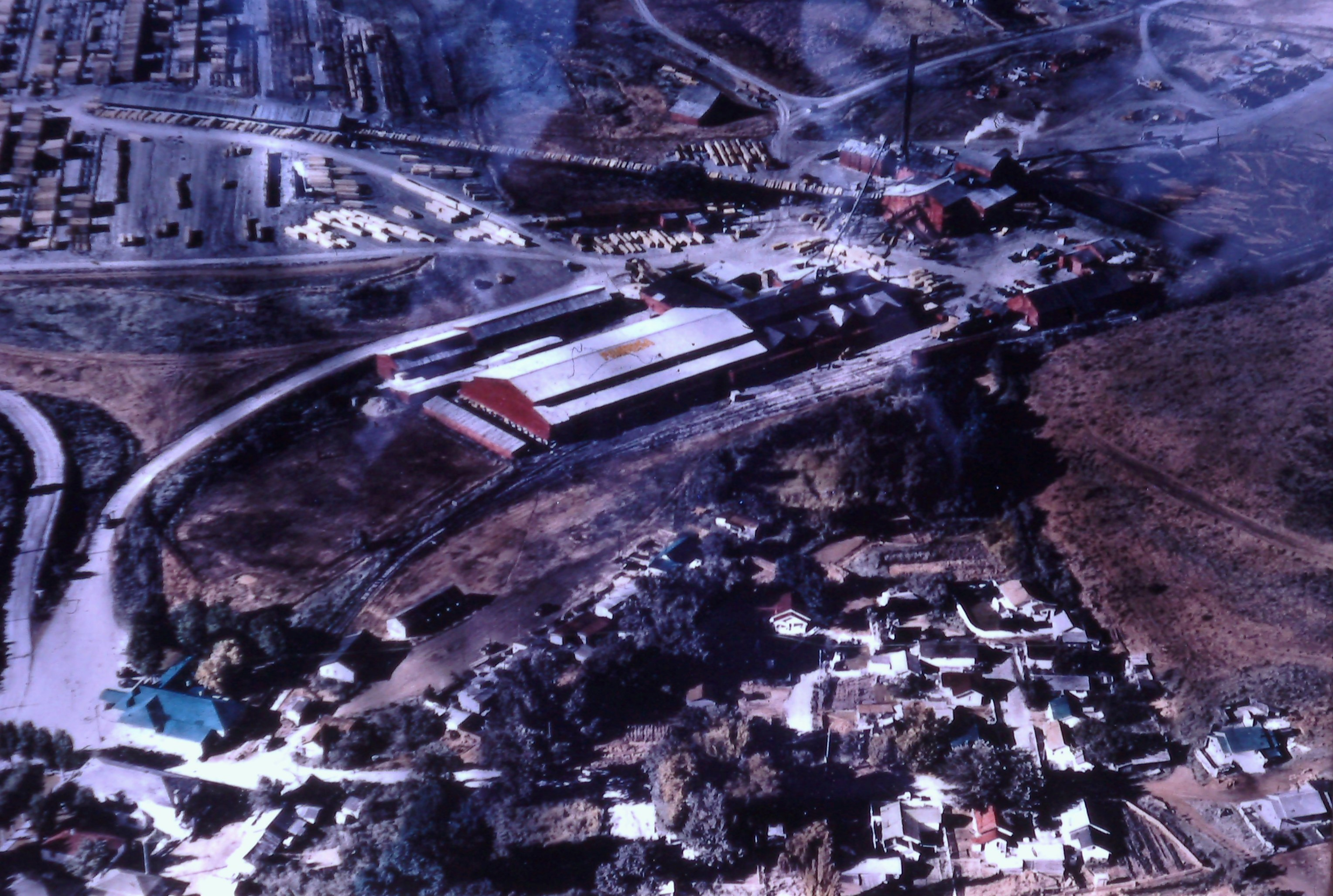
- View of Pondosa in 1952

- Location within Oregon Location within the United States
- Coordinates: 45°0′29″N 117°38′34″W
- Country: United States
- State: Oregon
- County: Union
- Elevation: 3,261 ft (994 m)
- Time zone: UTC-8 (Pacific (PST))
  - Summer (DST): UTC-7 (PDT)
- GNIS feature ID: 1136642

Pondosa is an unincorporated community and ghost town in Union County, Oregon, United States.

The town came into being in 1927, when the four Stoddard brothers of La Grande bought land in the area. They moved the sawmill operations of the Grande Ronde Lumber Company in nearby Perry to the site. The town was named after the Ponderosa Pines that dotted the area. A post office was established in 1927. In 1931, Truman Collins of The Collins Companies of Portland bought the mill. The mill was sold again in 1956, this time to Boise Cascade, which made plans to shut down the mill. This caused the decline of the town, which had over 500 inhabitants at the time. The post office was discontinued following a severe fire that damaged the majority of the town on June 20, 1959.
