= George Stoddard =

George E. Stoddard
- Born: January 7, 1917; Perry, Oregon
- Died: March 30, 2009 (aged 92)
- Occupation: Real estate financier

George E. Stoddard (January 7, 1917 – March 30, 2009) was a real estate financier who pioneered the use of the sale-and-leaseback transaction.

Stoddard was born in Perry, in Union County, Oregon, in 1917. His family moved east in 1928, living in Eastchester, New York. Stoddard earned a bachelor's degree from Brigham Young University, an MBA from Harvard Business School, and a law degree from Fordham University.

He worked for 34 years at the Equitable Life Assurance Society before joining W. P. Carey & Co. in 1979. At W. P. Carey, Stoddard chaired the independent investment committee, personally reviewing every deal raised by the firms' acquisition team. "If he didn't approve of a deal, it wouldn't get done," William Polk Carey, the firm's chairman, is reported to have said.
