= Riverfront Park (Salem, Oregon) =

Park in Salem, Oregon, U.S.

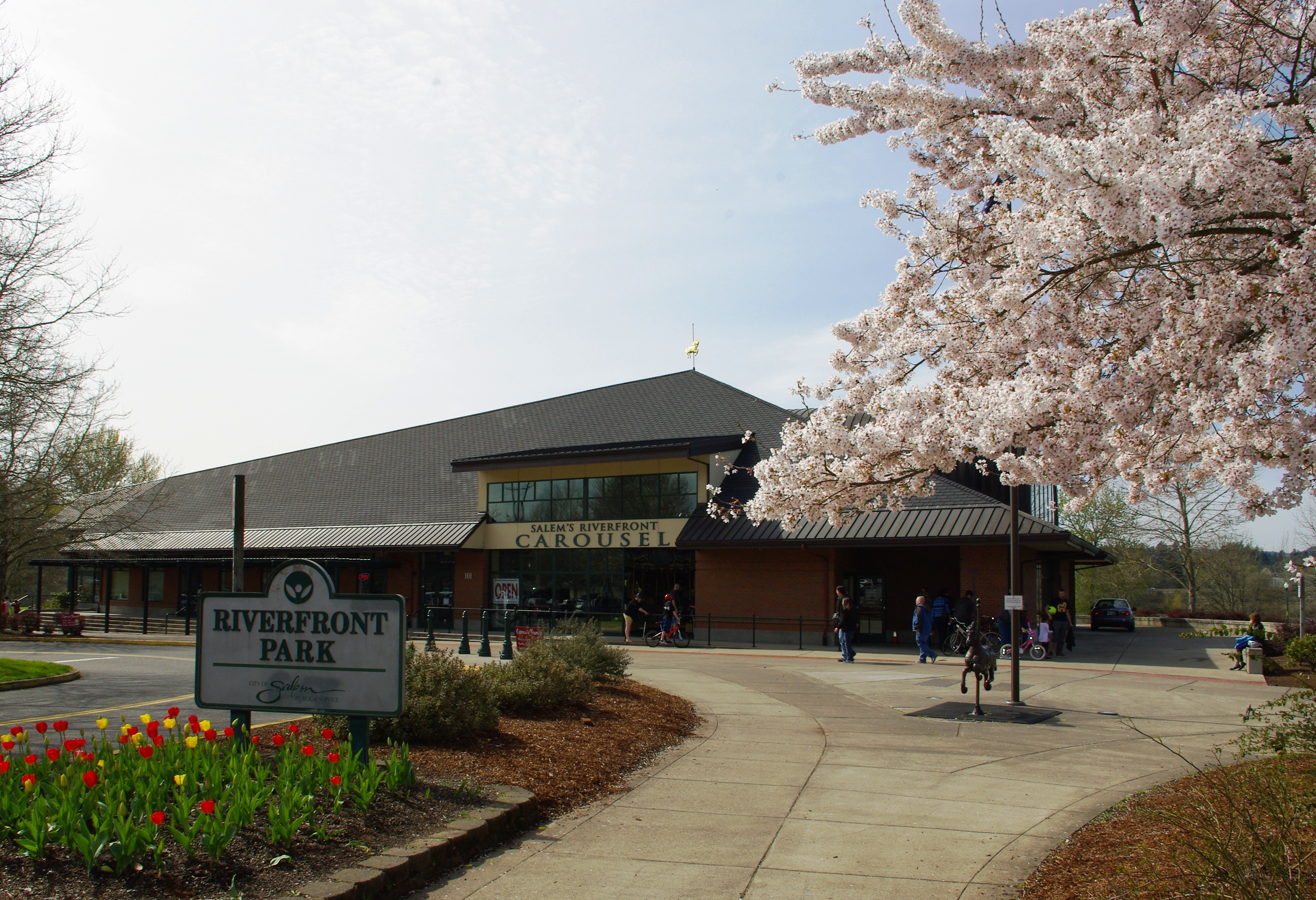
- Entrance to the park with the building housing the carousel in the background, 2012
- Interactive map of Riverfront Park
- Location: Salem, Oregon, U.S.
- Coordinates: 44.942°N 123.04316°W
- Area: 23 acres (9.3 ha)

Riverfront Park is a 26-acre park located along the Willamette River in Salem, Oregon, in the United States. Features include the Riverfront Carousel, A. C. Gilbert's Discovery Village, an amphitheatre, a splashpad, a dock housing the Willamette Queen, and the Eco-Earth Globe. Annual events in Salem are often held at Riverfront, such as the World Beat Festival, outdoor movies, and holiday tree lightings.

A 2018 update to the Riverfront Park plan provided more amenities such as acquiring a 4-acre property at the southeast corner of the park, opening the Peter Courtney Minto Island pedestrian bridge, operation of a winter ice rink, and proposals of a new covered stage and performance area.

It is located on former industrial land owned by the Boise Cascade corporation redeveloped as part of the Riverfront-Downtown Urban Renewal Area.

== History ==
Before European settlement, the Kalapuya people had winter and summer camps in present-day Salem.

Settlers moved into the area in the mid-1800s and used Pringle Creek and the Willamette River for ferries and steam boats, and to power flour and lumber mills. The Oregon Pulp and Paper Plant was located at Trade and Commercial streets near modern-day Riverfront Park and began producing paper in 1920. Boise Cascade purchased the plant in 1962.

The City of Salem bought the land for the park in 1984, and created a plan for its development the same year. The City bought the Andrew T. Gilbert House adjacent to the property in 1985, and after additional home purchases and renovations, the Gilbert House Children's Museum (now A. C. Gilbert's Discovery Village) opened in 1989.

The Hazel Patton Riverfront Carousel was built largely by volunteers, with construction starting in 1995 and the carousel opening in 2001. The Eco-Earth Globe outdoor sculpture was completed in 2003 and restored in 2018. The Centennial Pavilion was added in 2005, funded by the Salem Rotary Club. The Tom McCall Memorial, a bronze sculpture of former Oregon governor Tom McCall, was dedicated in 2008. In 2009, the Union Street Railroad Bridge was converted into a pedestrian bridge to provide access to Wallace Marine Park in West Salem. The Peter Courtney Minto Island Bridge, a pedestrian bridge to Minto-Brown Island Park, was completed in 2017. The Gerry Frank Salem Rotary Amphitheater was completed in 2021; its design was inspired by Kalapuya basketry.

== See also ==
- List of contemporary amphitheatres
- Parks and recreation in Salem, Oregon
