= John Paulding (sculptor) =

American sculptor (1883–1935)

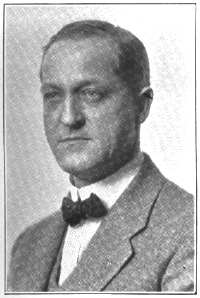
- Born: April 5, 1883; Darke County, Ohio
- Died: April 15, 1935 (aged 52); Chicago, Illinois
- Education: The Art Institute of Chicago
- Known for: Sculptor

Over the Top, Bolton Landing, New York

John Paulding (April 5, 1883 – April 15, 1935) was an American sculptor best remembered for his World War I memorials. Paulding was born in Darke County, Ohio. He studied sculpture at the Art Institute of Chicago and remained in Chicago until his death in 1935 at age 52.

At least two of his World War I memorials became very popular and casts of them can be found in many places throughout the United States.

== Controversy with E. M. Viquesney ==
Paulding and sculptor E. M. Viquesney both produced very similar World War I monuments within a few months of each other, resulting in various copyright violation lawsuits.

== Works ==
- American Doughboy, 1920.

- Ardmore, Oklahoma, at Walter W. Drew's gravesite in Rosehill Cemetery.
- Bay City, Michigan
- Northampton, Pennsylvania
- Olathe, Kansas
- Paducah, Kentucky
- Pueblo, Colorado
- Racine, Wisconsin
- Saline, Michigan
- Van Buren, Missouri

- Second-Lieutenant Francis Lowry Memorial, Fairmount Cemetery, Denver, Colorado, 1921. The fallen aviator after whom Lowry Air Force Base was named.
- Major-General James B. McPherson (The Reconnoissance), Memorial Park, McPherson County Courthouse, McPherson, Kansas, 1917.
- Over the Top, 1921.

- Albany, Missouri
- Amarillo, Texas
- Astoria, Oregon
- Bolton Landing, New York
- Buffalo, New York
- Catskill, New York
- Chicago, Illinois
- Chillicothe, Ohio
- Cincinnati, Ohio
- Elgin, Illinois
- Evanston, Wyoming
- Freeburg, Illinois
- Jonesboro, Arkansas
- Knoxville, Tennessee
- Ladysmith, Wisconsin
- Leavenworth, Kansas
- Llano, Texas
- Manitou Springs, Colorado
- Marshall, Missouri
- Martins Ferry, Ohio
- McMinnville, Oregon
- Missoula, Montana
- Newberry, South Carolina
- Norfolk, Nebraska
- Onaga, Kansas
- Pittsburgh, Pennsylvania
- Salem, Oregon (Over the Top to Victory)
- South Haven, Michigan
- Valentine, Nebraska
- Wahpeton, North Dakota
- Wautoma, Wisconsin
- Wheaton, Illinois
- Williamsport, Maryland
- Winner, South Dakota

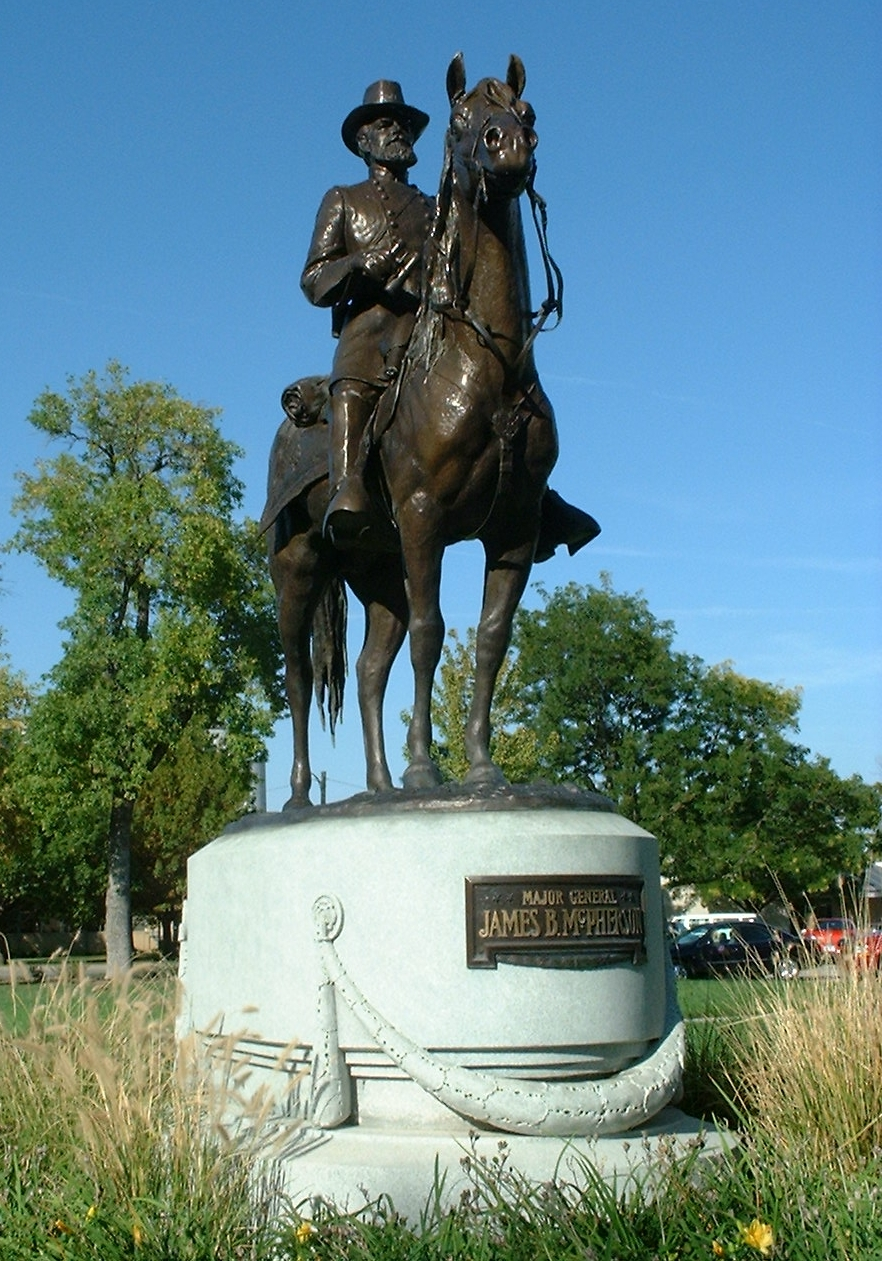
Major-General McPherson (1917), McPherson County Courthouse, McPherson, Kansas.

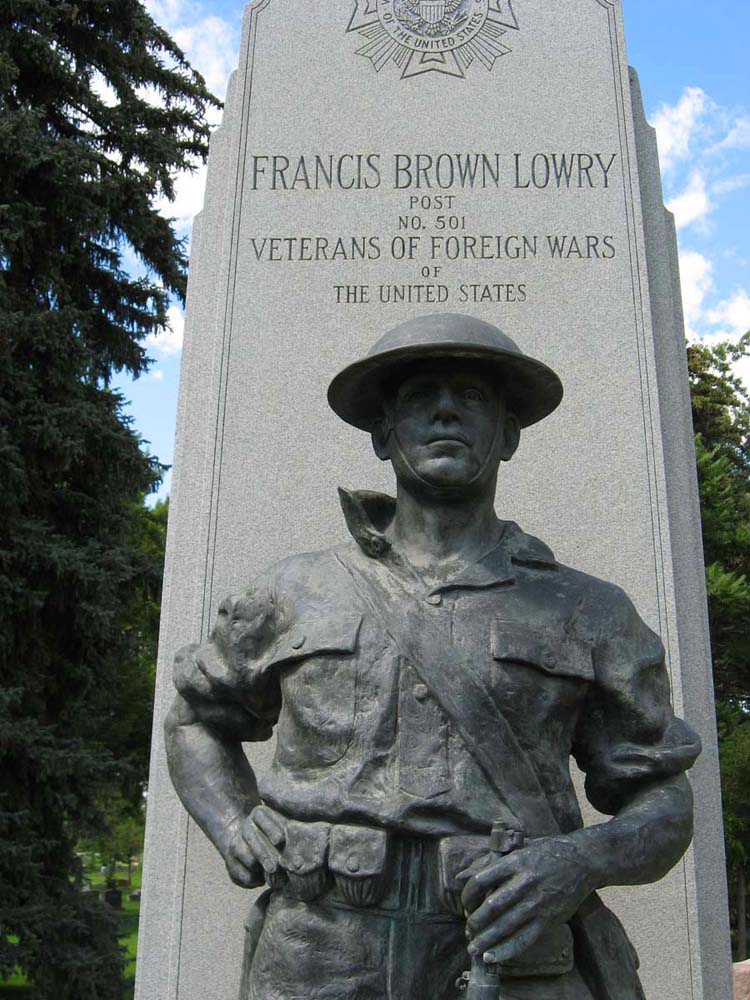
Lowry Memorial (1921), Fairmount Cemetery, Denver, Colorado.

Over the Top (1921), Llano, Texas.

== See also ==
- Astoria Victory Monument, Astoria, Oregon
