= Almanor Railroad =

Defunct railway line in the United States

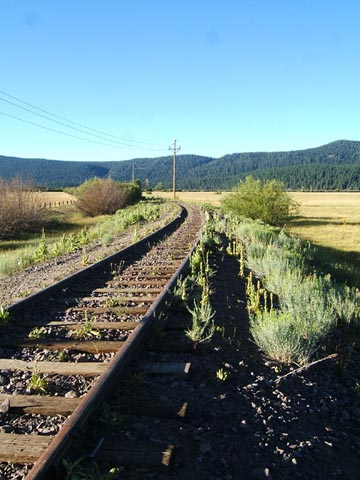
- Almanor Railroad running east-west on the meadows between Chester, CA, and Lake Almanor

Overview
- Headquarters: Chester, California
- Reporting mark: AL
- Locale: Sierra Nevada from Clear Creek Jct - Chester, CA
- Dates of operation: 1941–2009

Technical
- Track gauge: 4 ft 8 1/2 in (1,435 mm) standard gauge

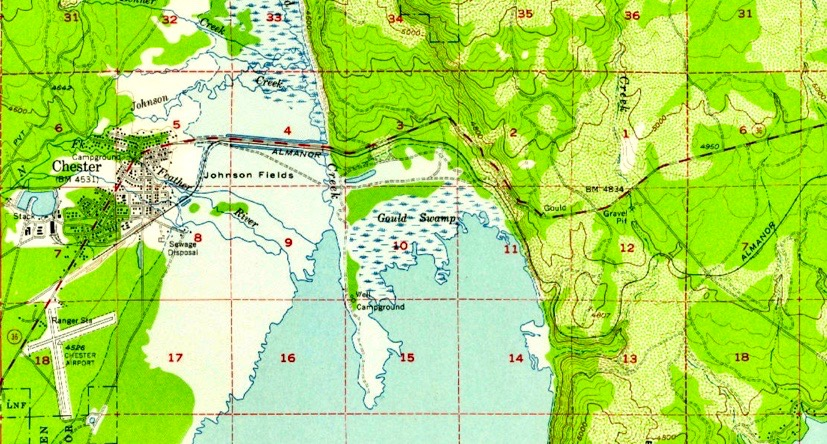
Western section of route in 1956

The Almanor Railroad (reporting mark AL) was a Class III short-line railroad operating in Northern California, United States. It was owned by Collins Pine Company, a division of The Collins Companies and annually hauled approximately 300 carloads of timber and lumber products generated at the mill. The railroad was named after Lake Almanor, which the railroad ran over (by causeway) and adjacent to.

The 13-mile (21 km) railroad ran west from a connection with the BNSF Railway (former Western Pacific) at Clear Creek Junction to Chester, California.

The Almanor Railroad was incorporated on September 15, 1941, and purchased the line from the Grande Ronde Lumber Company; and was discontinued in late 2009.

The railroad line was built before 1931 by the Red River Lumber Company which had a private electric logging railroad with a trestle over the Feather River and ran from Westwood (about 3 miles (4.8 km) east of Clear Creek Junction) to Chester. The portion of the Red River Lumber line between Westwood and Chester was the BNSF mainline from Keddie to Bieber. The BNSF also has trackage rights over the Almanor Railroad.

The Almanor Railroad had one GE 44-ton switcher locomotive built in 1946, and one GE 70-ton switcher built in 1955.
