= Pacific albus =

Hybrid poplar

Pacific Albus is a hybrid poplar grown in the Pacific Northwest, near Boardman, Oregon. Its name is from the Latin word albus meaning white. It has similar characteristics to aspen and cottonwood.

== History ==
Potlatch Corp. planted 18,000 acres of the tree in the early 1990s to sell as pulpwood. As the industry declined, the tree farm was sold to the Collins Companies which mills and markets the wood. The Forest Stewardship Council has certified the Pacific Albus plantation as meeting FSC environmental and social goals. The tree farm has 24,807 acres of the hardwood trees.
