= Astoria Victory Monument =

- U.S. National Register of Historic Places
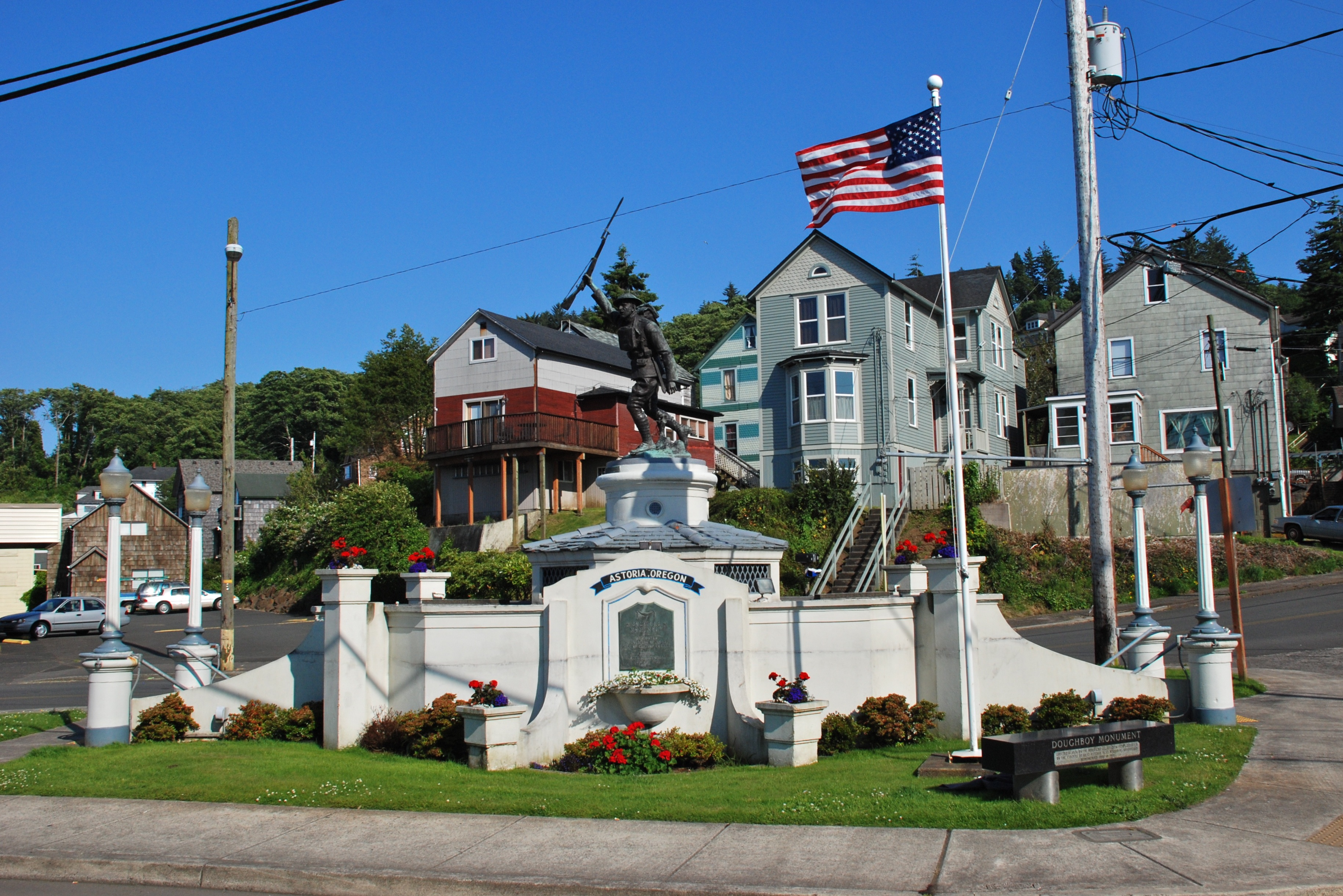

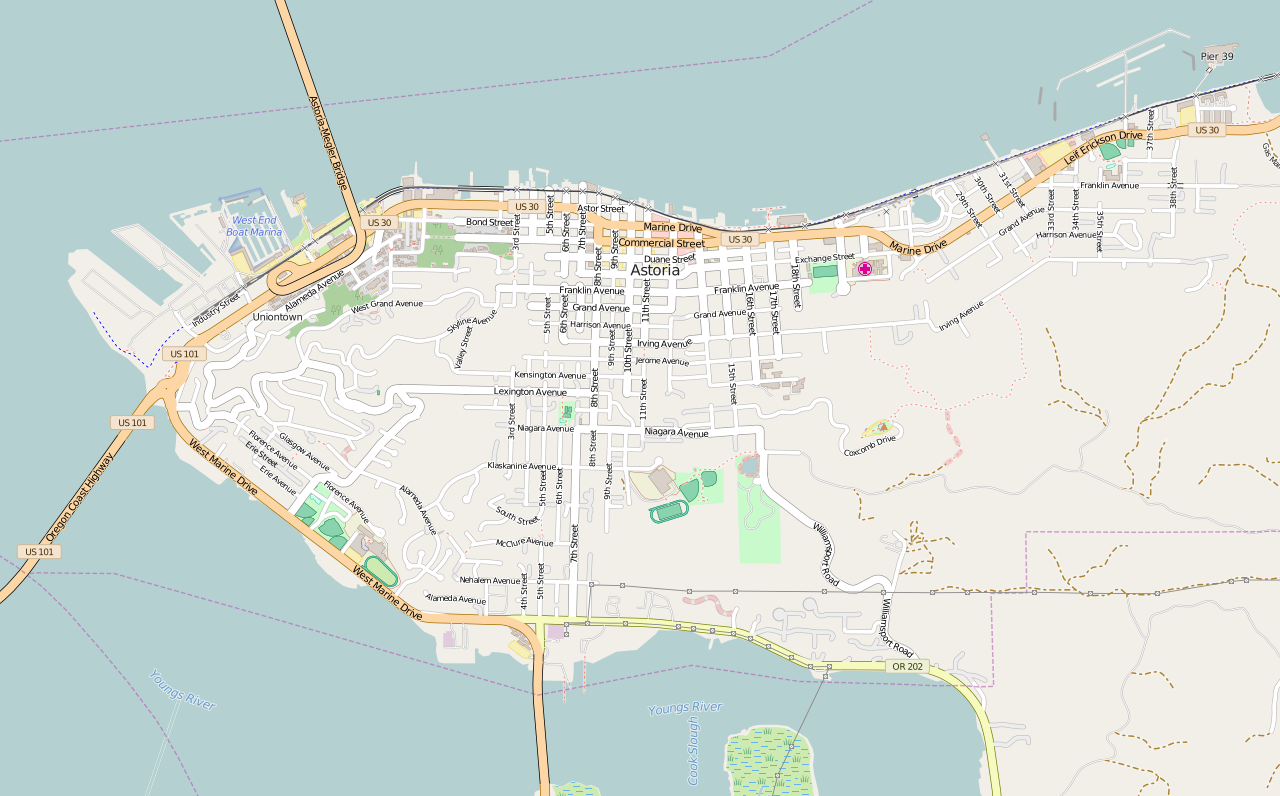
- Location within Astoria OR
- Location: Intersection of Columbia Avenue and West Marine Drive; Astoria, Oregon, United States
- Coordinates: 46°11′22.7″N 123°50′52.6″W
- Area: less than one acre
- Built: 1926
- Architect: Diamond, Charles T.; Paulding, John
- Architectural style: Late 19th and 20th Century Revivals, Mission/Spanish Revival, Mediterranean Revival
- NRHP reference No.: 84000466
- Added to NRHP: November 15, 1984

The Astoria Victory Monument, also known as the Doughboy Monument or Soldiers' Monument, is a monument located in Astoria, Oregon, in the United States. It is listed on the National Register of Historic Places. The concrete, Spanish Revival monument designed by Charles T. Diamond was constructed in 1926, incorporating a cast of a sculpture by John Paulding. The structure was recognized individually by the National Register of Historic Places in 1984 and as part of the Uniontown–Alameda Historic District in 1988.

== History ==
The National Register of Historic Places recognized the monument individually on November 15, 1984, and later included the structure as part of the Uniontown–Alameda Historic District on August 25, 1988.

In the mid-2000s, the monument received a $10,000 grant from the State Historic Preservation Office to repair lights and windows, replace doors, renovate the restroom facilities and install new plumbing and toilet fixtures.

== See also ==
- 1926 in art
- National Register of Historic Places listings in Clatsop County, Oregon
- Over the Top to Victory (1924), Salem, Oregon
