= The Collins Companies =

American forest products company

Collins

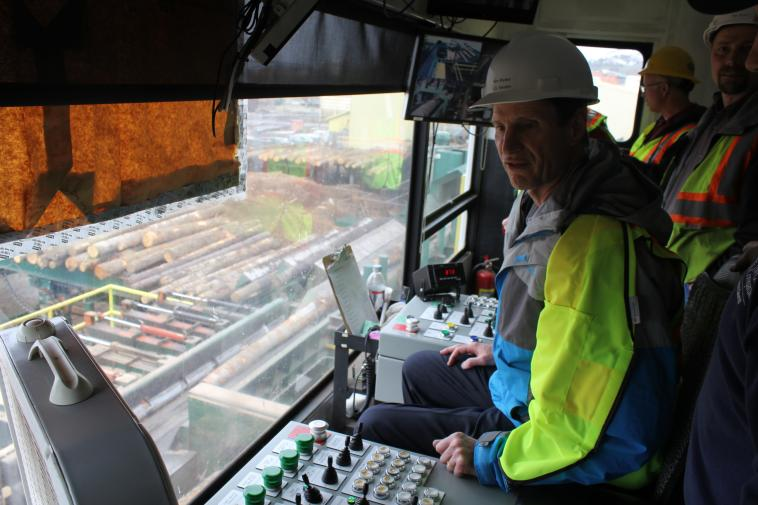
- Company type: Private
- Industry: Forest products
- Founded: 1855
- Headquarters: Wilsonville, Oregon, U.S.
- Key people: Eric Schooler (President); Cherida Collins Smith (Chair of the Board)
- Number of employees: appx. 647 (2017)
- Website: www.collinsco.com

Collins is an American forest products company that began operations in 1855. Headquartered in Wilsonville, Oregon, Collins owns forests and operates sawmills in Oregon, California, and Pennsylvania. Collins also manufactures siding and trim, particleboard, hardwood, and softwood lumber.

== History ==
=== 19th century ===
Truman Doud (TD) Collins began what was later known as the Collins Companies in 1855 at Turkey Run near Whig Hill, Pennsylvania. He and five others, including his brother, Joseph Van Halen (JV) Collins, bought a steam mill and timber from John Alexander. By 1864, TD Collins bought out the remaining partners including his brother.

=== 20th century ===
Before TD Collins died in 1914, he owned, along with others, a large number of sawmills in the Tionesta Valley of Pennsylvania, over 60,000 acres (240 km^{2}) of timberland, the Tionesta Manufacturing Company, the Nebraska Box Mill, the Mayburg Chemical Plant, plus over 100 miles (160 km) of logging railroad, 41 miles (66 km) of main line, 25 locomotives, several oil companies, and a bank.

Married to Mary Stanton Collins, they had one son, Everell (ES) Stanton Collins. Following TD's death, Everell took over the company. He moved the company westward, purchasing forestlands in northern California, Washington, and Oregon. By the time he died in 1940, ES Collins would oversee the operations of 15 timber, logging, railroad, and pulp & paper companies in four states, in addition to moving the company headquarters from Pennsylvania to Portland, Oregon.

Following his father, Truman W. Collins became president. During his years in the timber business he began implementing sustainable forest management practices. These practices contributed to the Collins Companies becoming the first privately owned forest products company in the United States to become certified by the Forest Stewardship Council. Truman Collins continued the family's charitable works including founding, among others, the Collins Foundation, the Collins Medical Trust, and the Collins/McDonald Trust.

Following Truman's death in 1963, Truman's brother-in-law, Elmer Goudy took over the presidency, followed by his son, Alan Collins Goudy. Truman's wife, Maribeth Wilson Collins, also became involved in the company, serving first as president of The Collins Foundation and later as Chair of the Board of The Collins Companies.

=== 21st century ===
In 2005, Maribeth Collins stepped down and her daughter, Cherida Collins Smith, became Chair of the Board of The Collins Companies; Maribeth's son, Truman W. Collins, Jr., became president of the Collins Foundation; and her son, Terry Collins, a forester with the company, became president of the Collins Timber Company.

== Environmental commitment ==
Collins has committed to being responsible partners in land and resource management with a policy of change through leadership. Collins asserts that third-party, independent certification of forest lands is the best way to ensure the viability of the total forest ecosystem. The company is also a member of Forest Stewardship Council.

In 1997 Collins began integrating the principles of The Natural Step, an international organization dedicated to assisting organizations around the world use a systems-based approach to sustainable practices. By adopting The Natural Step principles, Collins is working towards bringing sustainability to all their business operations.

As a commitment to land and resource stewardship, Collins joined Climate Leaders, a U.S. Environmental Protection Agency partnership to develop climate change strategies. Collins has committed to reducing greenhouse gases by 18% by 2010.

== Sawmill locations ==
Collins operates sawmills in the following locations as of 2025:

- Kane, Pennsylvania
- Chester, California
- Lakeview, Oregon

== FSC-certified forest locations ==
- Collins Almanor Forest, softwood: Chester, California
- Collins Lakeview Forest, softwood: Lakeview, Oregon
- Collins Pennsylvania Forest, hardwood: Kane, Pennsylvania

== Closed locations ==
- Collins Pacific albus Tree Farm, hardwood: Boardman, Oregon. Closes September 2016.

== See also ==
- List of companies based in Oregon
- Almanor Railroad, a defunct rail line operated by the company
