= Over the Top to Victory =

Sculpture in Salem, Oregon, U.S.

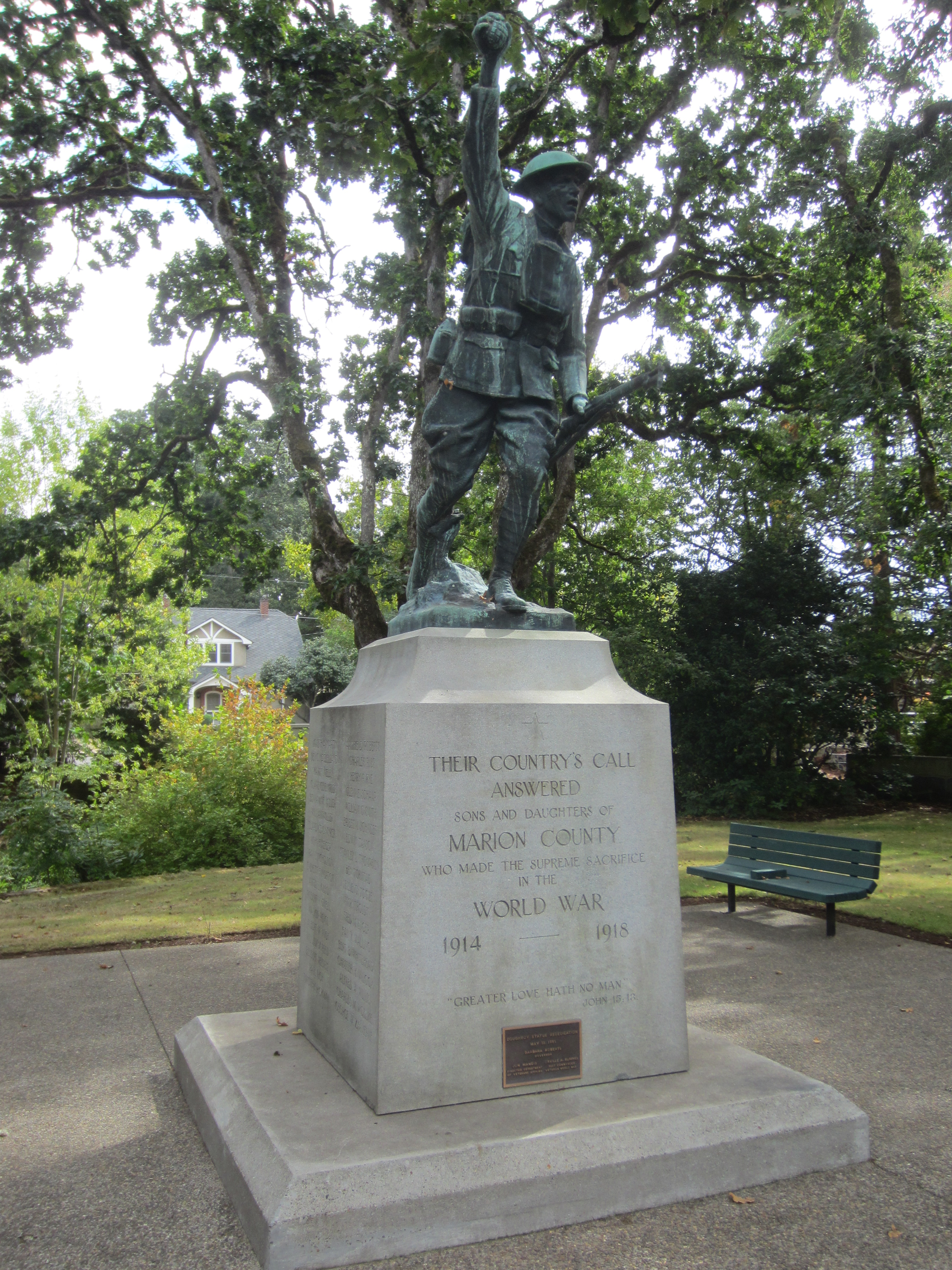
- The memorial in 2018
- Artist: John Paulding
- Year: 1924
- Type: Sculpture
- Medium: Bronze
- Dimensions: 2.1 m × 0.71 m × 1.9 m (84 in × 28 in × 74 in)
- Condition: "Treatment needed" (1993)
- Location: Salem, Oregon, United States; 44.94438°N 123.02625°W

Over the Top to Victory, also known as Doughboy Statue and Their Country's Call Answered, is an outdoor bronze sculpture by John Paulding, formerly located at the Marion County Courthouse in Salem, Oregon, United States. The statue was commissioned by the American War Mothers and the Gold Star Mothers Club to commemorate the 87 men and one woman from Marion County who died in World War I.

== Description ==
The bronze sculpture depicts a uniformed World War I soldier, running and holding a gun with a bayonet in his proper left hand and a grenade in his opposite hand. He is shown wearing a backpack and hat. The statue measures approximately 7 feet (2.1 m) x 28 inches (0.71 m) x 74 inches (1.9 m) and rests on a square, tapered stone base that has a height of 76 inches (1.9 m) and a width of 84 inches (2.1 m).

An inscription on the lower right reads: CAST BY AMERICAN ART BRONZE FOUNDRY / J. PAULDING SC. © 1920 CHICAGO. On the front of the base is the inscription: THEIR COUNTRY'S CALL / ANSWERED / SONS AND DAUGHTER OF / MARION COUNTY / WHO MADE THE SUPREME SACRIFICE / IN THE / WORLD WAR / 1914–1918 / "GREATER LOVE HATH NO MAN" / JOHN 15:13. The base's front also includes a plaque with a signed founder's mark and the text: DOUGHBOY STATUE REDEDICATION / MAY 18, 1991 / BARBARA ROBERTS / GOVERNOR / JON MANGIS / DIRECTOR, DEPARTMENT OF VETERANS' AFFAIRS / ORVILLE A. RUMMELL / PAST COMMANDER / VETERAN WORLD WAR. Displayed on the other three sides of the base are the names of 87 men and one woman from Marion County who died in the war.

== History ==
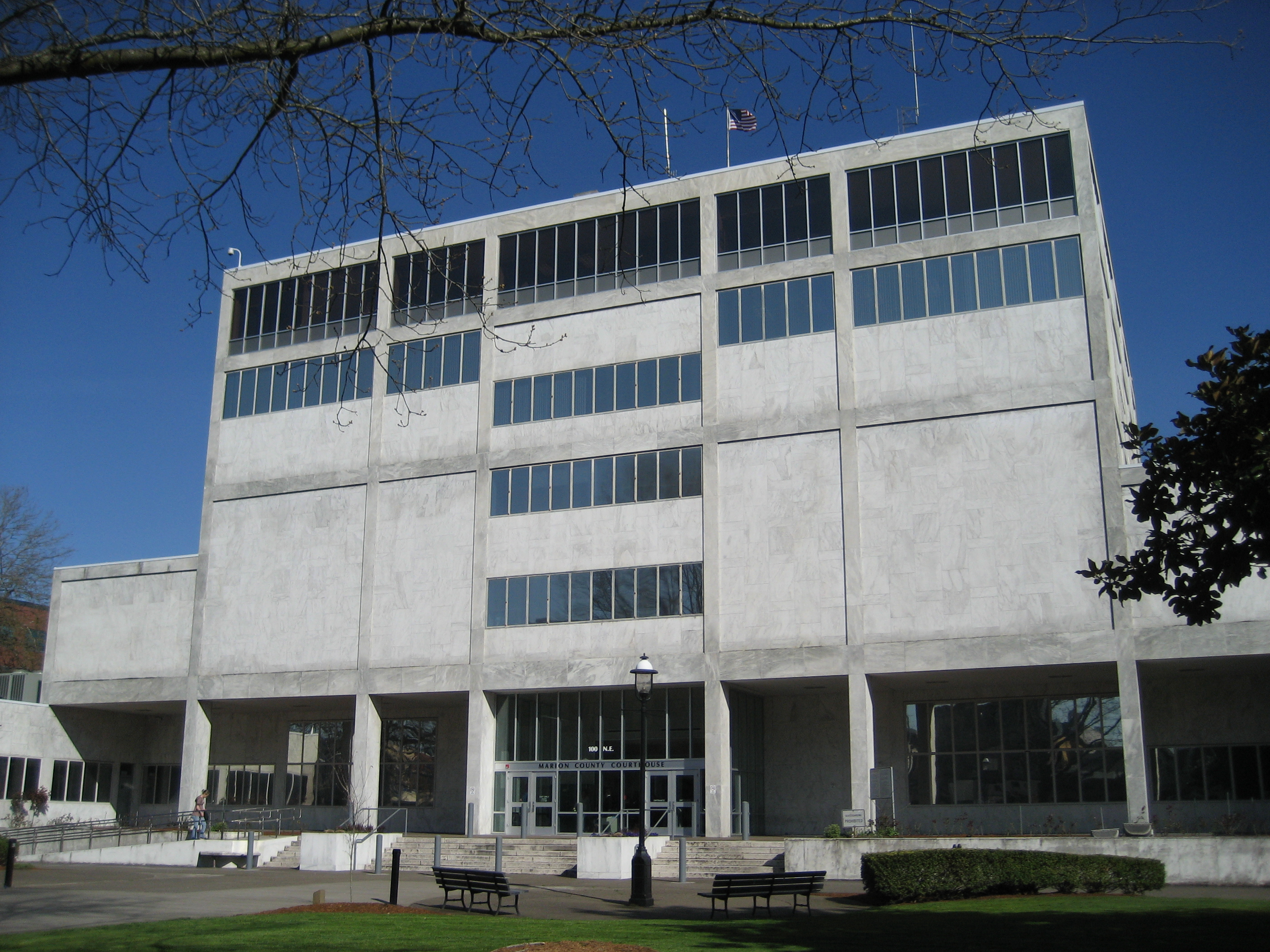
The statue was installed at the Marion County Courthouse from 1924 to 1991.

John Paulding's Over the Top to Victory was commissioned by the American War Mothers and the Gold Star Mothers Club to commemorate the 88 people from Marion County who died in World War I. The statue was copyrighted in 1920 and dedicated at the Marion County Courthouse on November 11, 1924. It was moved to its current location in May 1991 by the Oregon Department of Veterans' Affairs and rededicated on May 18, 1991. The sculpture was surveyed and considered "treatment needed" by the Smithsonian Institution's "Save Outdoor Sculpture!" program in May 1993, and was still administered by the Department of Veterans' Affairs then.

== See also ==
- 1924 in art
- Astoria Victory Monument
