= Peter Courtney Minto Island Bridge =

Bicycle and pedestrian bridge in Salem, Oregon, U.S.

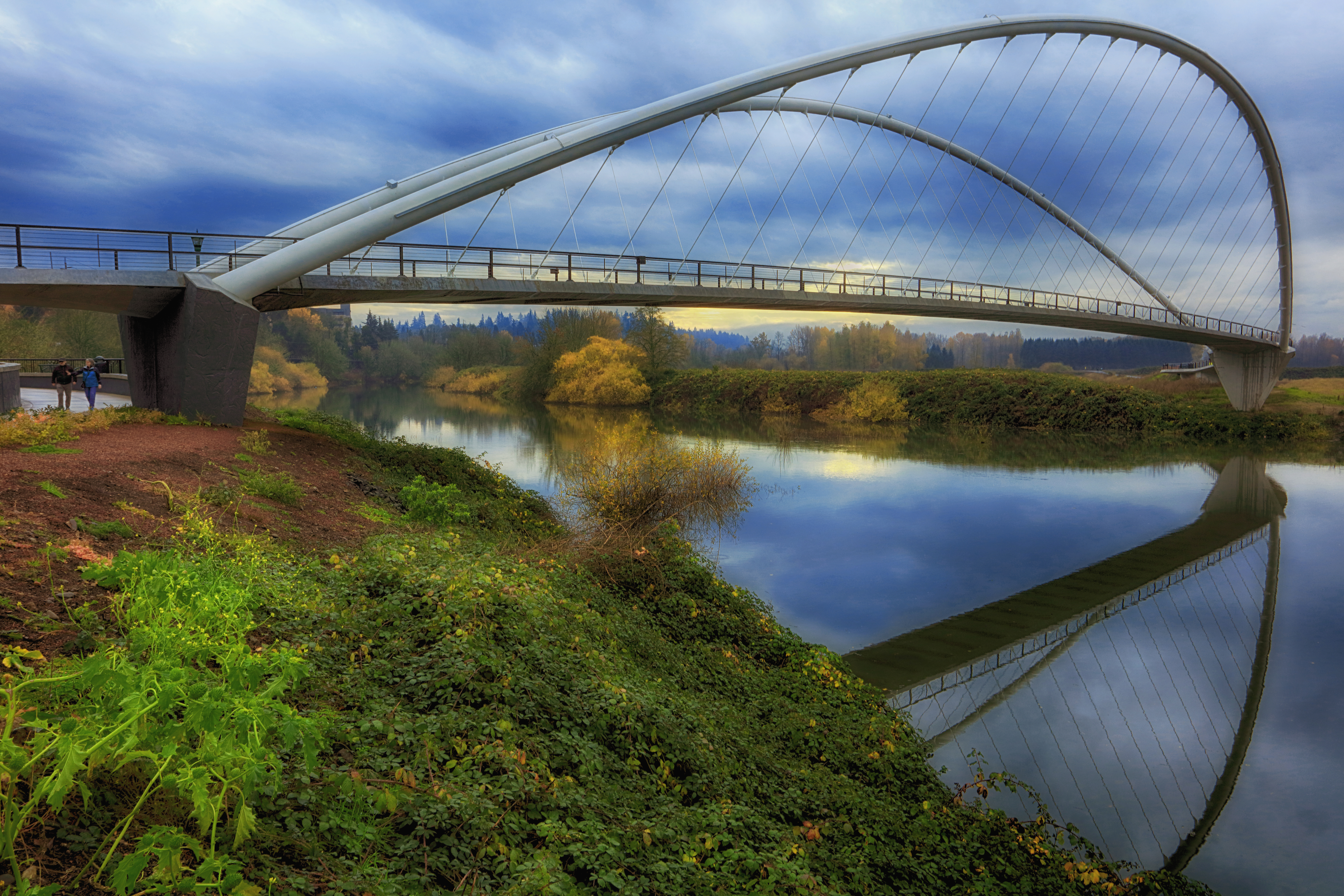
- The bridge in 2017
- Coordinates: 44°56′19″N 123°2′42″W
- Crosses: Willamette River (Slough)
- Locale: Salem, Oregon
- Official name: Peter Courtney Minto Island Bicycle and Pedestrian Bridge
- Named for: Peter Courtney
- Owner: City of Salem

Characteristics
- Design: tied-arch
- Total length: 505.8 feet (154.1 m)
- Width: 14 feet (4.267 m)
- Longest span: 305 feet (93 m)
- No. of spans: 5

History
- Architect: Jiri Strasky
- Engineering design by: OBEC Consulting Engineers
- Constructed by: Legacy Contracting, Inc.
- Construction end: August 2nd, 2017
- Opened: April 28th, 2017

Location
- Interactive map of Peter Courtney Minto Island Bridge

The Peter Courtney Minto Island Bridge is a bicycle and pedestrian Bridge in Salem, Oregon, United States, connecting downtown Salem to Minto-Brown Island Park. With a budget of $10 million, it was approved by the City of Salem in 2010, with construction beginning in May 2015. The bridge is named in honor of Peter Courtney, the longest-serving legislator in Oregon history, who had advocated for the construction of a bridge connecting downtown Salem to Minto-Brown for decades. The bridge is painted white, and illuminated with LED lights built into the handrails and arches, pointed downwards to mitigate light pollution.
