= Truman Wesley Collins Legal Center =

Building on the Willamette University campus in Salem, Oregon, U.S.

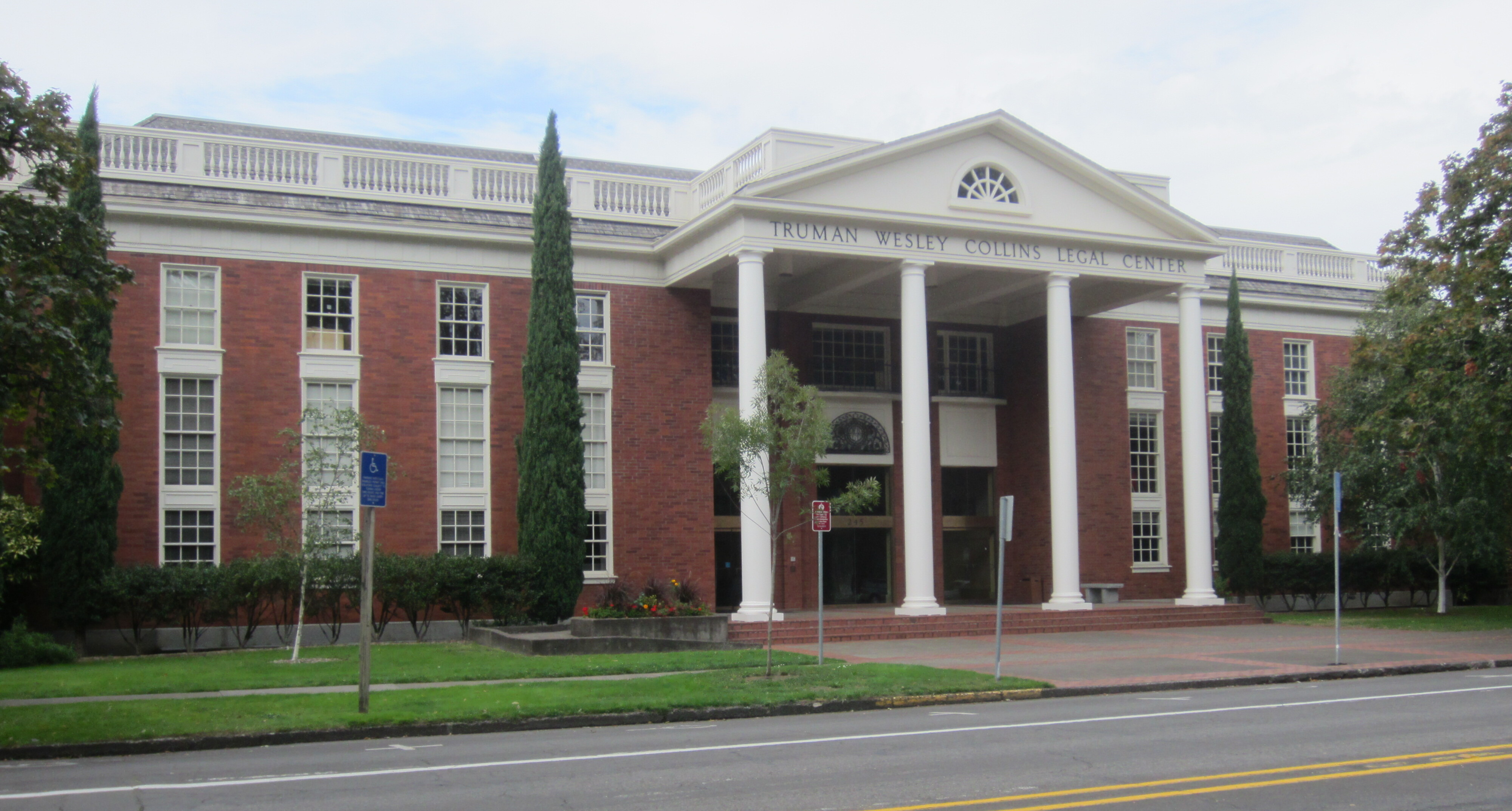
- The building's exterior in 2018
- Interactive map of the Truman Wesley Collins Legal Center area

General information
- Status: Active
- Type: Law school facility
- Location: Salem, Oregon, Winter Street, Salem, United States
- Coordinates: 44.9367°N 123.0311°W
- Current tenants: Willamette University College of Law
- Named for: Truman W. Collins
- Opened: September 1967
- Renovated: 1992
- Cost: $1.1 million (original)

The Truman Wesley Collins Legal Center houses the Willamette University College of Law at Willamette University in Salem, Oregon, United States. Located on Winter Street, just south of the Oregon State Capitol, the facility features classrooms, the law library, administrative offices, and faculty offices. The building also contains a fully functioning trial courtroom used for moot court. It houses Lady Justice, the 12-foot (3.7 m)-tall, 300-pound (140 kg) statue formerly located on the roof of the Marion County Courthouse.

== History ==
The $1.1 million facility opened in September 1967. The law school building was named in honor of Truman W. Collins, a Willamette University alumni and well known businessman and philanthropist.

In 1992, the Collins Legal Center went through an award-winning renovation and expansion that ended with a dedication ceremony and speech by former U.S. Supreme Court Associate Justice Sandra Day O'Connor. In her dedication speech, O'Connor advocated for civility among those in the legal profession and for avoiding personal attacks among lawyers. In December 2005, the school's moot courtroom was used for a real civil trial after the Marion County Courthouse was damaged the previous month.
