= Lady Justice (Salem, Oregon) =

Sculpture in Salem, Oregon, U.S.

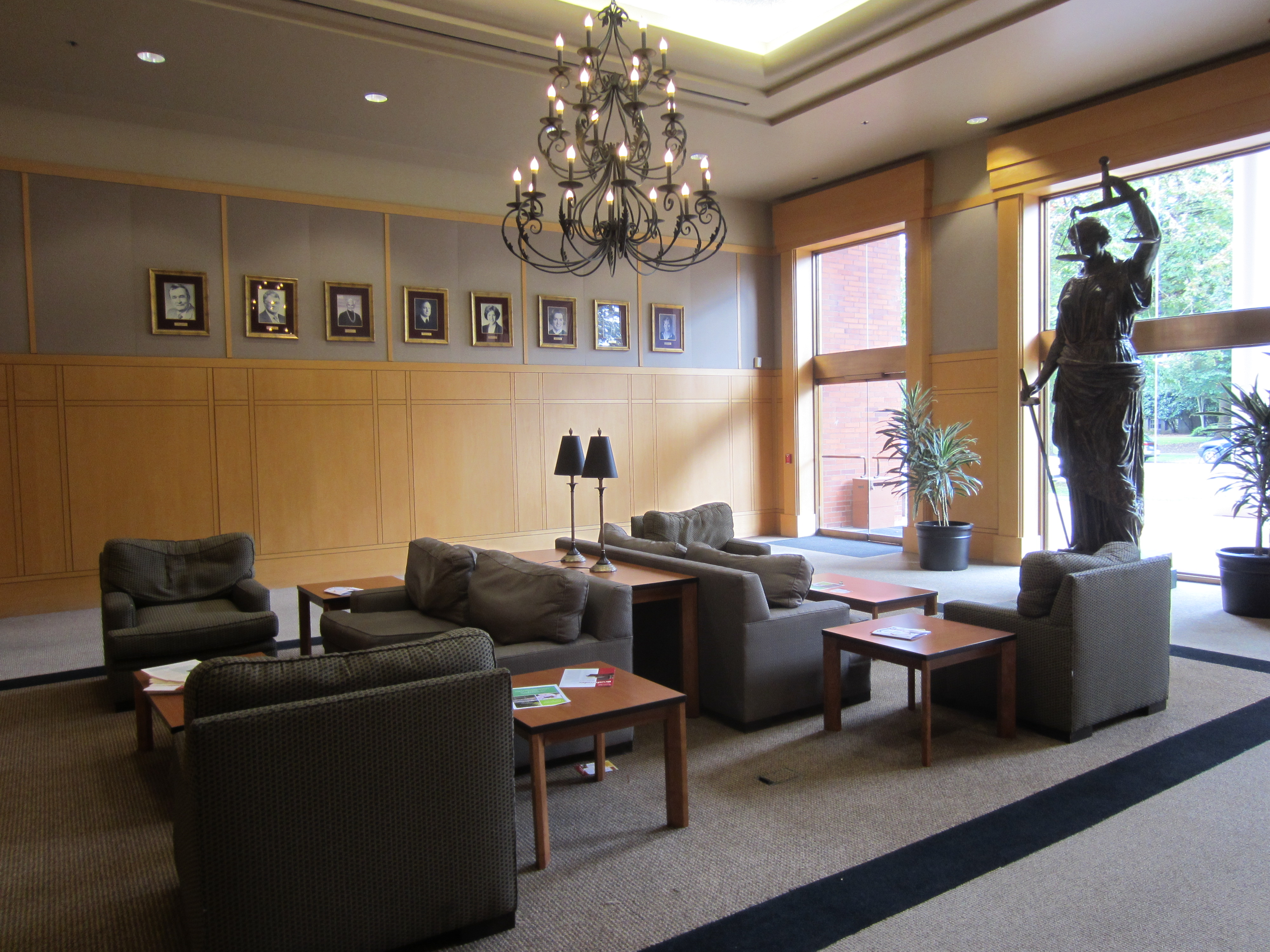
- The statue in the Truman Wesley Collins Legal Center in 2018
- Medium: Sculpture
- Subject: Lady Justice
- Location: Salem, Oregon, United States
- 44°56′12.9″N 123°2′0.4″W

Lady Justice is a 12-foot (3.7 m)-tall, 300-pound (140 kg) Lady Justice statue in Salem, Oregon, United States. Formerly located on the roof of the Marion County Courthouse, the sculpture is now installed in Willamette University's Truman Wesley Collins Legal Center. The Willamette University College of Law received the statue when the Marion County Courthouse was demolished to make way for a new one.
