= World War I Memorial (Salem, Oregon) =

1954 sculpture and war memorial in Salem, Oregon, U.S.

- United States
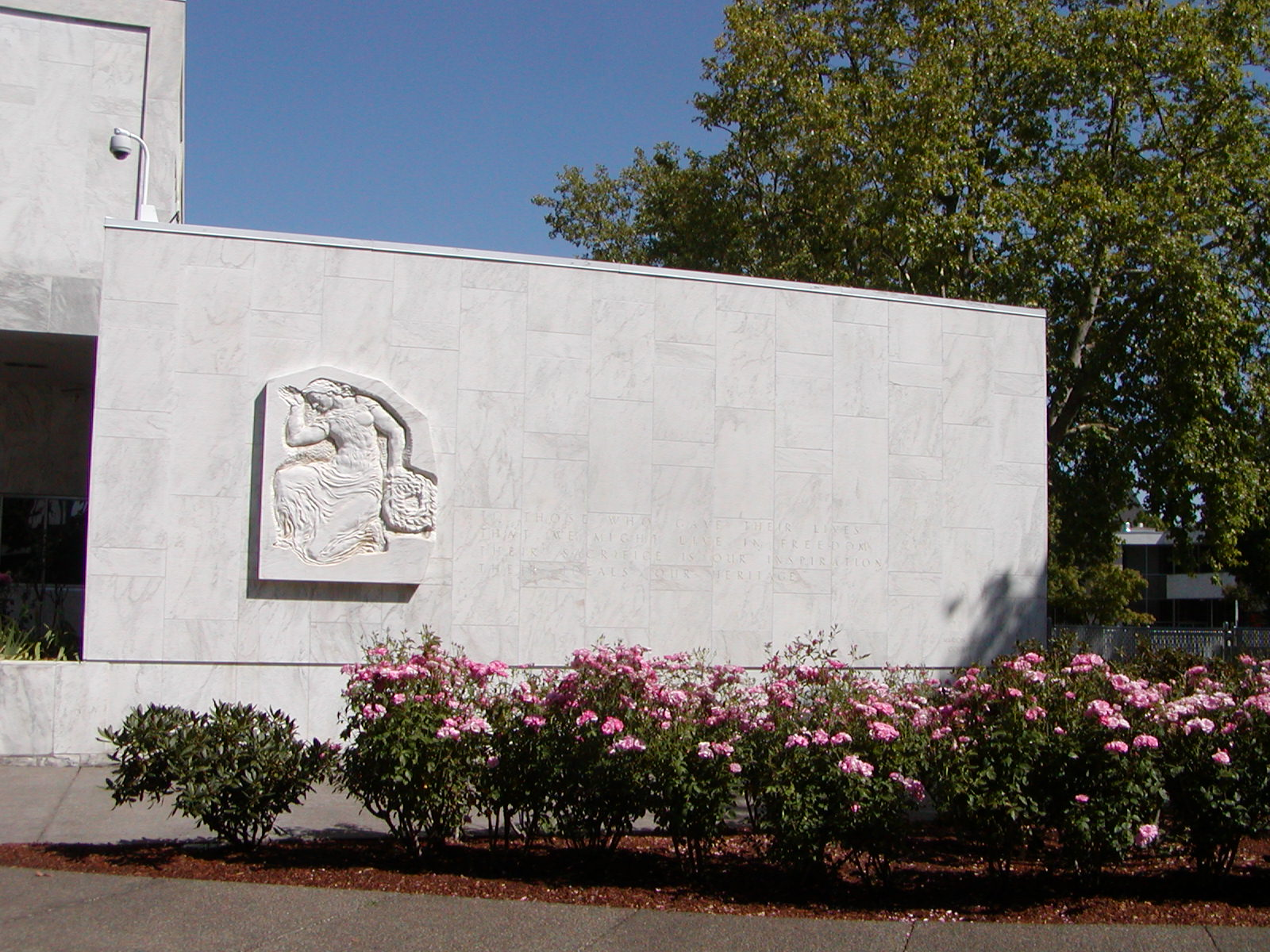
- For First World War
- Unveiled: 1954
- Location: 44.93976°N 123.03653°W; Salem, Oregon

The World War I Memorial, also known as the Veterans Memorial, is a relief sculpture and war memorial by artist Frederic Littman and architect Pietro Belluschi, installed of the exterior of Salem, Oregon's Marion County Courthouse, in the United States. The marble sculpture was dedicated in 1954 and depicts a grieving woman kneeling and holding a wreath. Viesko & Post served as the contractor of the project. The sculpture was deemed "well maintained" during the Smithsonian Institution's "Save Outdoor Sculpture!" program in July 1993.

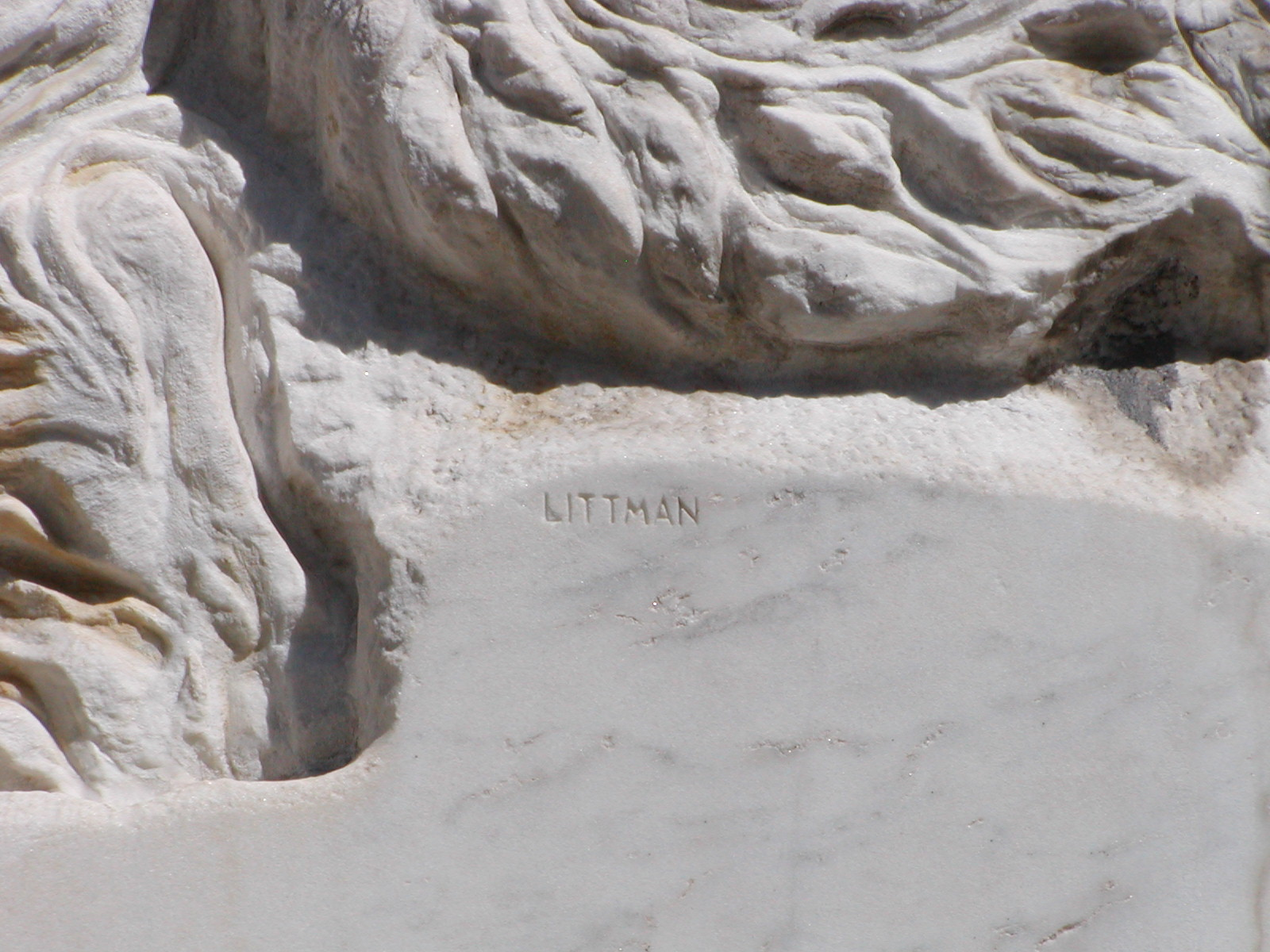
Detail of the sculpture, 2008

== See also ==
- 1954 in art
