= Veterans of Foreign Wars Monument =

Sculpture and war memorial in Salem, Oregon, U.S.

- Oregon Department of Veterans' Affairs
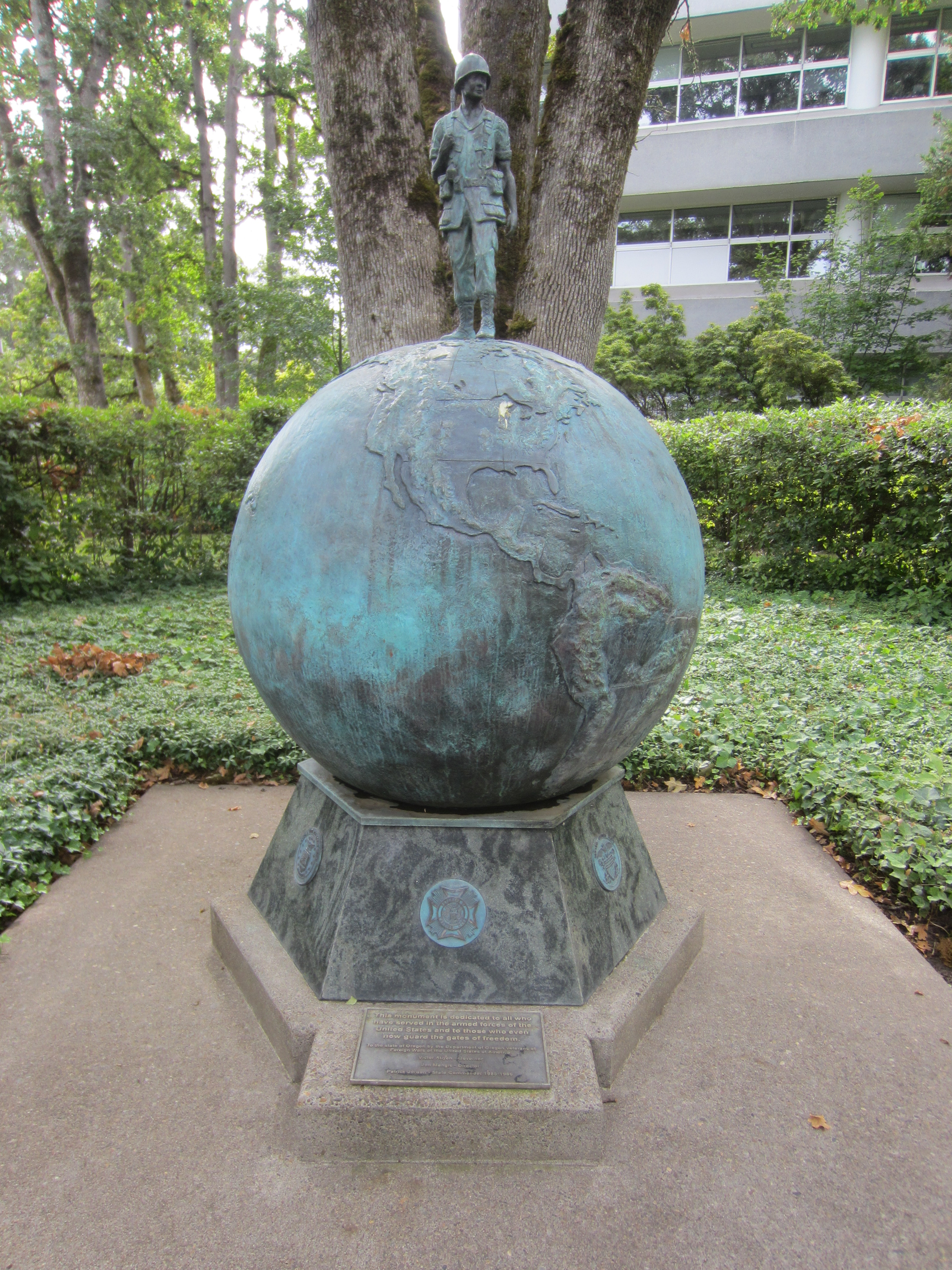
- The monument in 2018
- For US veterans and active service members
- Established: 1986
- Location: 44.94516°N 123.02672°W; Salem, Oregon
- Designed by: Roger McGee
- This monument is dedicated to all who have served in the armed forces of the United States and to those who have even now guard the gates of freedom.
Veterans of Foreign Wars Monument
- Medium: Bronze sculpture, green marble base
- Subject: Soldier atop a globe
- Dimensions: 180 cm (69 in); 120 cm diameter (48 in); 16 x 48 x 42 in base

The Veterans of Foreign Wars Monument, also known as To All Who Have Served, is a monument installed outside the Oregon Department of Veterans' Affairs building in Salem, Oregon, United States. The memorial features a soldier atop a globe.

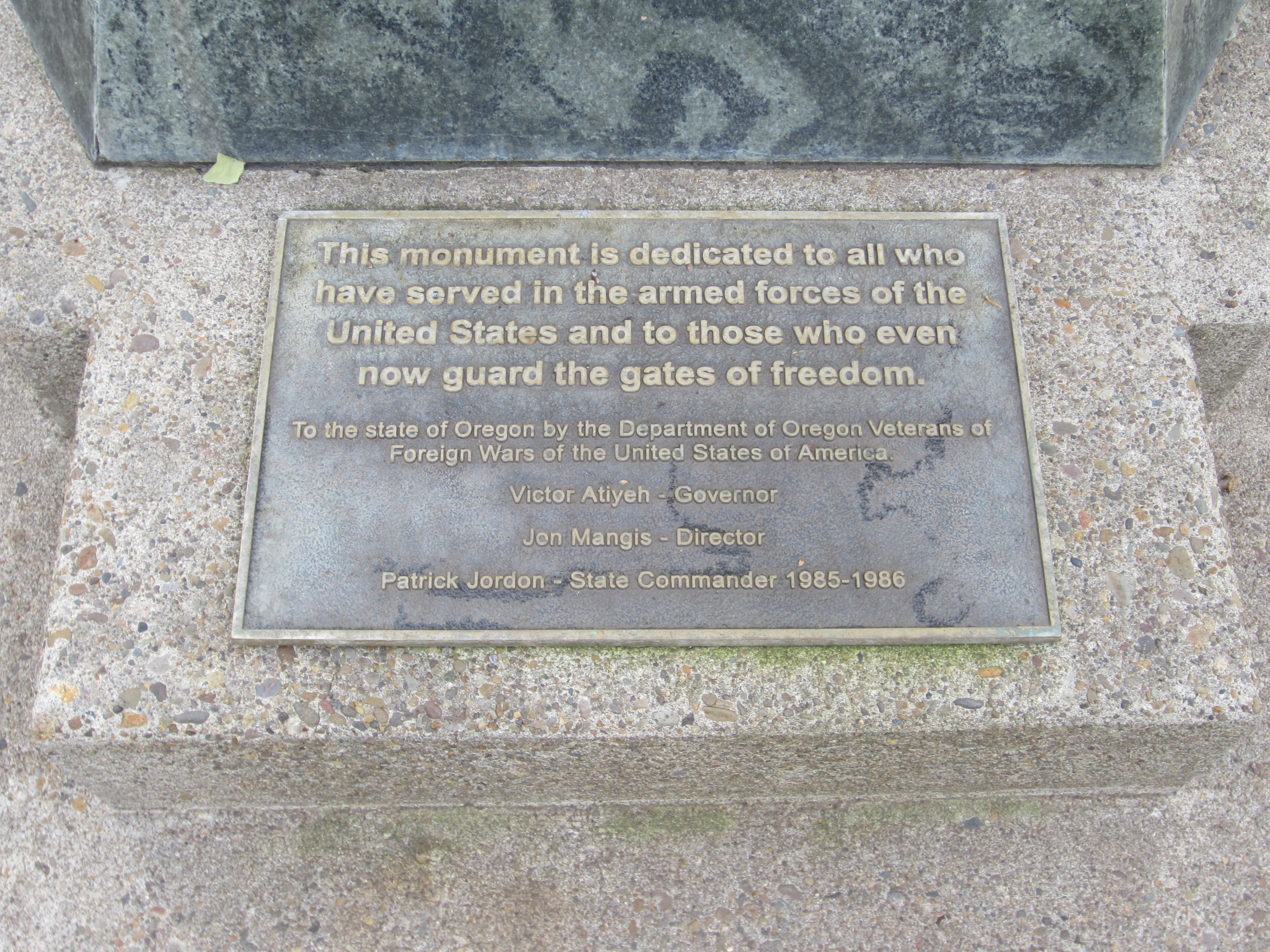
Plaque
