= To Scale the Scales of Justice =

Sculpture in Salem, Oregon, U.S.

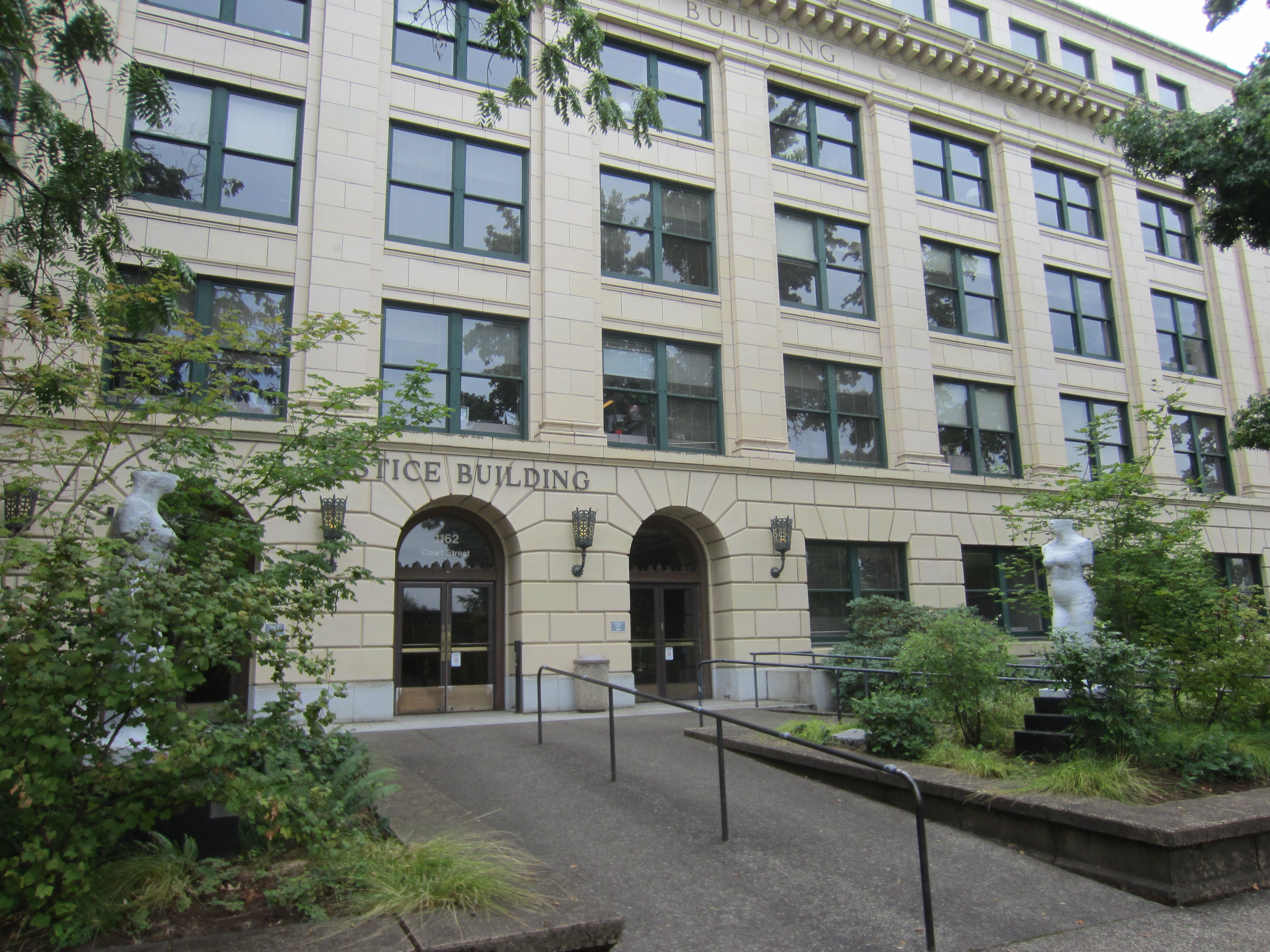
- The statues displayed outside the Justice Building in 2018
- Artist: M.J. Anderson
- Year: 2010
- Medium: Marble sculpture
- Location: Salem, Oregon, United States
- 44.93817°N 123.02742°W

To Scale the Scales of Justice is a 2010 marble sculpture by M.J. Anderson, installed outside the Justice Building in Salem, Oregon, United States.

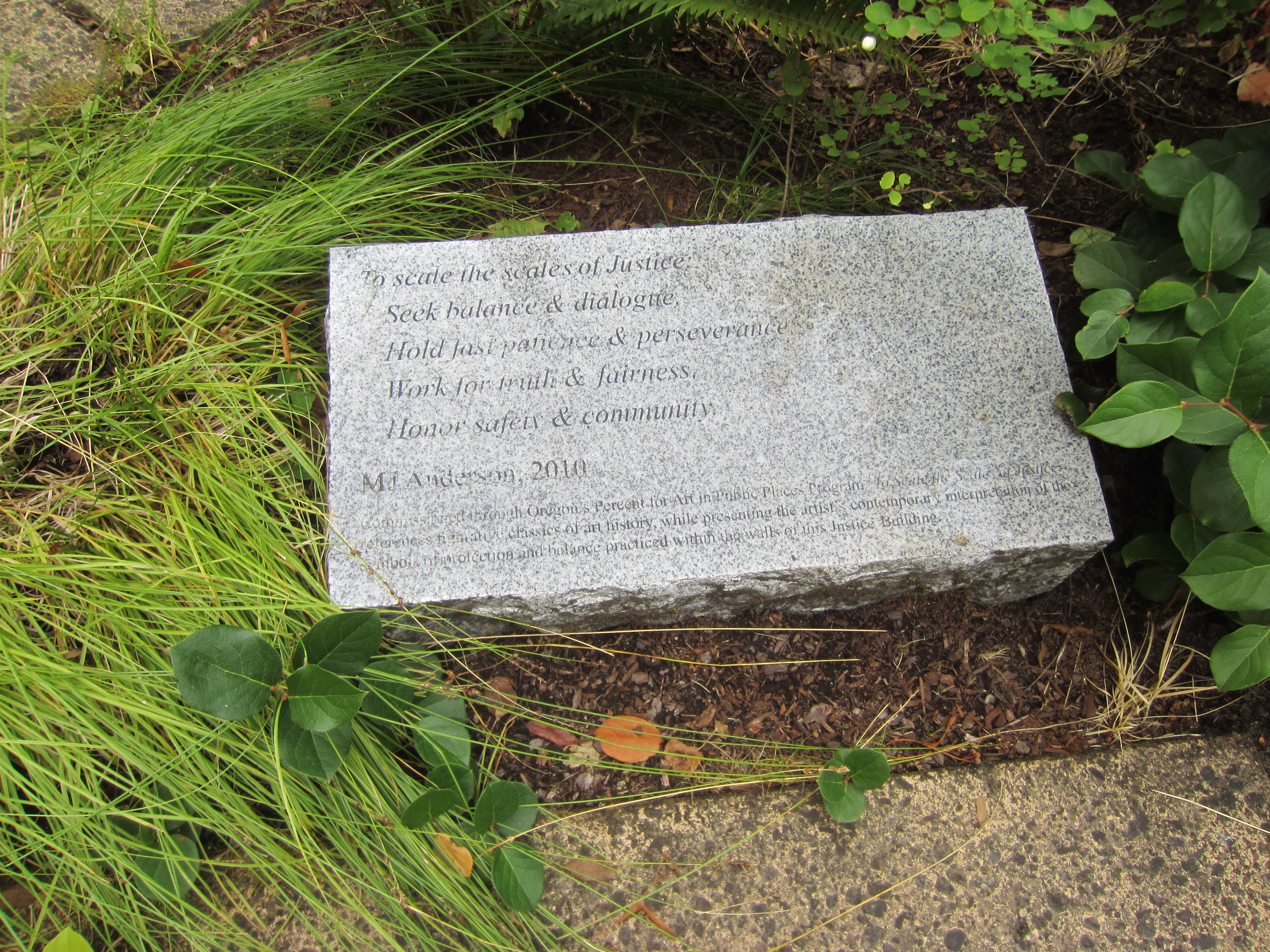
Plaque, 2018

== See also ==
- 2010 in art
