= Truman W. Collins =

American businessman, civic leader, and philanthropist

- Born: Truman Wesley Collins; August 29, 1902; Ostrander, Washington, US
- Died: February 23, 1964 (aged 61)
- Education: Willamette University; Harvard University
- Occupation: Businessman
- Spouse: Maribeth Wilson Collins
- Children: 4
- Awards: Portland First Citizen award (1962)

Truman Wesley Collins (August 29, 1902 – February 23, 1964) was an American businessman, civic leader, and philanthropist from the state of Oregon. He was born into a wealthy and influential business family. Collins graduated from Willamette University and then attended graduate school at Harvard University. After college, he returned to the Pacific Northwest to join his family's lumber business. Over the years, he was the top executive for a number of Collins family businesses. He was also an active leader in several timber-related industry groups and contributed to selected education and religious institutions.

== Early life ==
Collins was born in Ostrander, Washington, on August 29, 1902, the son of Everell Stanton Collins and Mary (Laffey) Collins. The Collins family was one of the wealthiest and most influential families in Oregon at that time. His grandfather, Teddy Collins, started the family's successful lumber business in Pennsylvania and it was expanded into Oregon by his father.

Collins grew up in the small town of Ostrander in western Washington. His family moved to Portland when Collins was in high school. He attended Lincoln High School, graduating from there in 1918. He attended college at Willamette University in Salem, Oregon. While at Willamette, he joined Kappa Gamma Rho fraternity. During his senior year, Collins was editor of the university's yearbook. Collins graduated from Willamette with a bachelor's degree in 1922. He then went on to graduate school at Harvard University, where he earned a master's degree in business in 1925.

== Businessman ==
In 1925, the Collins family purchased timber land and a sawmill in Glenwood, Washington. The new business was called the Mount Adams Pine Company. The Collins family hired J. T. "Mac" McDonald to run the Glenwood sawmill operation. After graduating from Harvard, Collins returned to the Pacific Northwest to join the family business at Glenwood with McDonald as his mentor. In addition to his hands-on experience in Glenwood, Collins began developing his executive skills. In 1926, Collins was elected to the board of directors of the Oregon Pulp and Paper Company. He remained on that board for a number of years.

By 1931, the timber supply in the Glenwood area had run low, so the Collins family sold the sawmill and the related local timber land. Collins wanted to use the revenue from the Glenwood sale to purchase the Grande Ronde Lumber Company in Pondosa, Oregon. While his father was not convinced this was a good investment, he reluctantly approved the acquisition. Once the purchase was complete, Collins relocated much of the Glenwood workforce to Pondosa, including J. T. McDonald. The Pondosa operation included a railroad used to haul trees from the forest to the sawmill. However, as cutting operations moved farther from the mill extending the railroad become very expensive, so the company began experimenting with truck logging. This proved successful, and in 1937, the Collins family joined McDonald in a truck logging business called the McDonald Logging Company. In 1939, a second joint-venture logging company was formed in Lakeview, Oregon.

During the 1930s, Collins served as an officer in a number of lumbermen's associations, helping to develop forest industry standards. In 1935, he was elected to the regional board of directors for the Western Pine Association and then appointed regional chairman. A year later, he was elected to the Western Pine Association's national board of directors as second-vice president. In 1938, Collins attended the annual Pacific Logging Congress, where he was elected to the organization's board of directors. The following year, he was elected president of the Pacific Logging Congress.

Collins' father died in 1940. In his father's will, Collins was given the rights to develop 67,800 acres (274 km^{2}) of virgin timber land in the Sierra Nevada Mountains near the small community of Chester, California. The property was known as the Curtis, Collins and Holbrook Company lands. Collins continued to manage the Grande Ronde Pine Company as he began developing the Chester property as a long-term sustainable forest. The first logs came out of the Curtis, Collins and Holbrook forest in 1941. However, the onset of World War II made development plans subject to the approval of the United States Government's War Production Board. Nevertheless, the new Chester sawmill began production in early 1943.

In September 1942, Collins was commissioned as a lieutenant in the United States Naval Reserve. This was a busy time for Collins. While he was serving in the navy, Collins kept in touch with his sawmill and forest managers by telephone. He was also appointed to the War Production Board's lumber product advisory committee. Despite his busy wartime work schedule, Collins married Maribeth Akin Wilson on March 12, 1943. Together they had four children.

In 1944, the Collins-McDonald truck logging business was expanded into a sawmill operation when the partnership bought the Lakeview Lumber Company, changing its name to the Lakeview Sawmill Company. The sawmill proved to be a profitable venture and in 1945 a second sawmill, the Fremont Sawmill, was added to the Lakeview operation. Despite two fires, one at each mill, both operations were rebuilt and were producing lumber within 90 days of the fires.

Since 1910, the Collins family had been a partner in the Elk Lumber Company in Medford, Oregon. In 1946, the family along with their chief forester, George Flanagan, bought out the other partners. They updated the sawmill plant and equipment, creating a state-of the-art operation. The new mill facility began production later that year with Flanagan as general manager.

Over the next several decades, Collins served on the boards of directors of Crown Zellerbach Corporation, Standard Insurance Company, United States National Bank, and the National Lumber Manufacturers Association. He also served as chairman of the Forest Industries Council. He worked continuously to create sustainable forest operations in Chester, Lakeview, Medford, and on Collins family land near Kane, Pennsylvania. The Grande Ronde Pine Company closed its Pondosa sawmill in 1958. The other logging and lumber production operations continued under Collins' leadership until his death in 1964.

== Community service and philanthropy ==
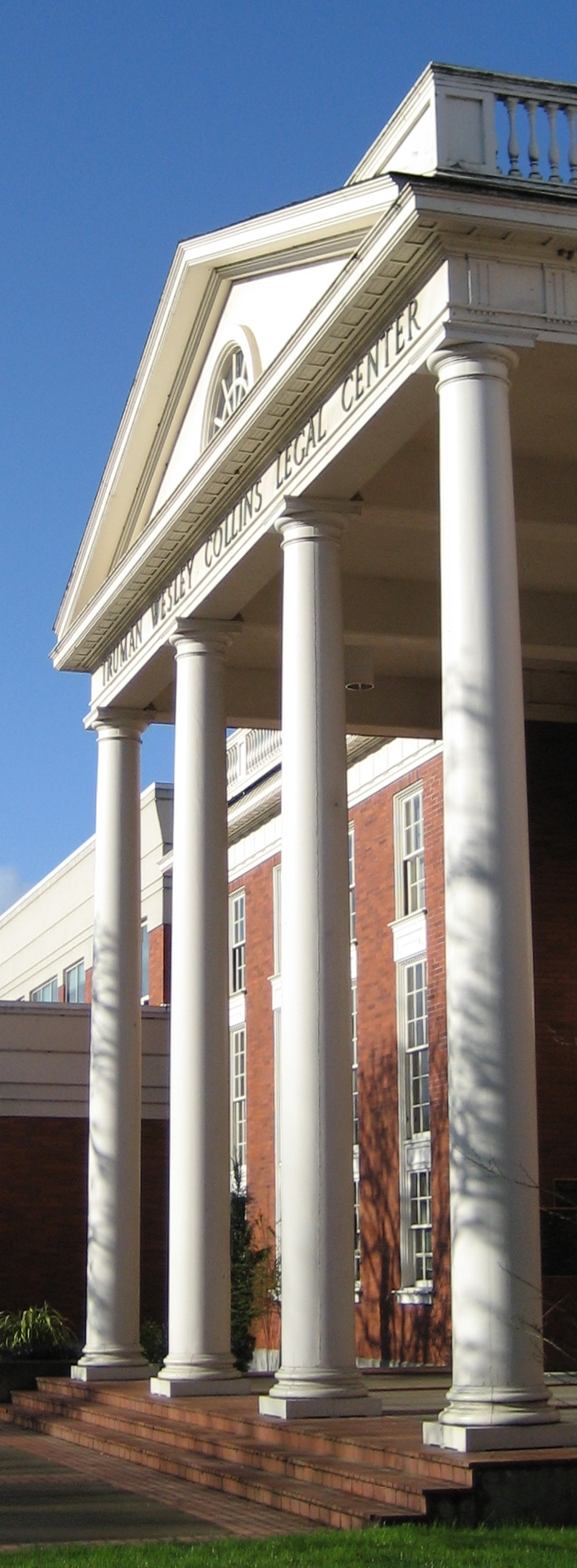
Truman Wesley Collins Legal Center at Willamette University

Collins began volunteer service work shortly after he finished graduate school. His commitment to community service and philanthropy continued throughout his life. Over the course of his life, Collins contributed his time and resources to a wide range of educational, religious and political institutions and causes.

In 1926, Collins was elected to Willamette University's board of trustees. He continued to be involved in Willamette's governance throughout his life. He eventually became chairman of the university's board of trustees. He served as chairman for eight years prior to his death. Over the years, Collins and his family were major benefactors of the university. He was also a generous contributor to the Methodist Church. Collins also served as a member of the Methodist Church's national board of missions.

In 1940, Collins joined J. T. McDonald to create the Collins-McDonald scholarship fund. The fund provided college scholarships to students from Lake County, Oregon. Over the years, the Collins-McDonald scholarships have helped make Lake County one of the best educated counties in Oregon. By 1989, over 500 Lake County students had gone to college with the help of Collins-McDonald scholarships.

In 1945, Collins was appointed to the regional Boy Scout executive committee. He remained an active Boy Scout leader for many years. In the 1950s, he served as interim chairman of Keep Oregon Green Association and later as chairman of that organization's board of trustees. In addition, he served on the board of directors of the Young Men's Christian Association.

Collins was also a major donor to the Republican Party and its candidates. In the 1960 election cycle, he was the most generous supporter of Republican candidates in the state of Oregon. This included being one of largest individual contributors to Mark Hatfield's successful campaign for governor.

In 1962, Collins was named Portland's First Citizen. The award recognized his many years of community service and philanthropic support for education and religion institutions.

== Death and legacy ==
Collins died of a heart attack on February 23, 1964, in Portland, Oregon. At the time of his death, he was one of Oregon's wealthiest businessmen. At the time of his death, he and his wife, Maribeth W. Collins had three children: twin sons Timothy and Terry and daughter Cherida. A fourth child, Truman Wesley Collins, Jr., was born three months after his death.

When he died, Collins left an estate of over $27,600,000. His will left 70 percent of the estate to his family. The remaining 30 percent went to various charities. Outside his family, the largest bequest went to Willamette University. His will also left a substantial gift to the Methodist Church.

During his lifetime, Collins created a number of trusts and scholarships that are still active today. They include the Collins Medical Trust, established in 1956 to fund medical research; the Almanor Scholarship Fund that supports students from Plumas County, California; the Collins-McDonald Trust Fund that provides scholarships to students from Lake County, Oregon; and the Collins Foundation that supports a wide range of charitable activities.

After his death, the Truman Wesley Collins Legal Center at Willamette University was named in his honor. In addition, the Truman W. Collins Sr. Law Internship Fund also carries his name. The fund helps Willamette law students pursue practical experience in nonprofit and public-interest law.
