= Sprague Fountain =

Fountain and sculpture in Salem, Oregon, U.S.

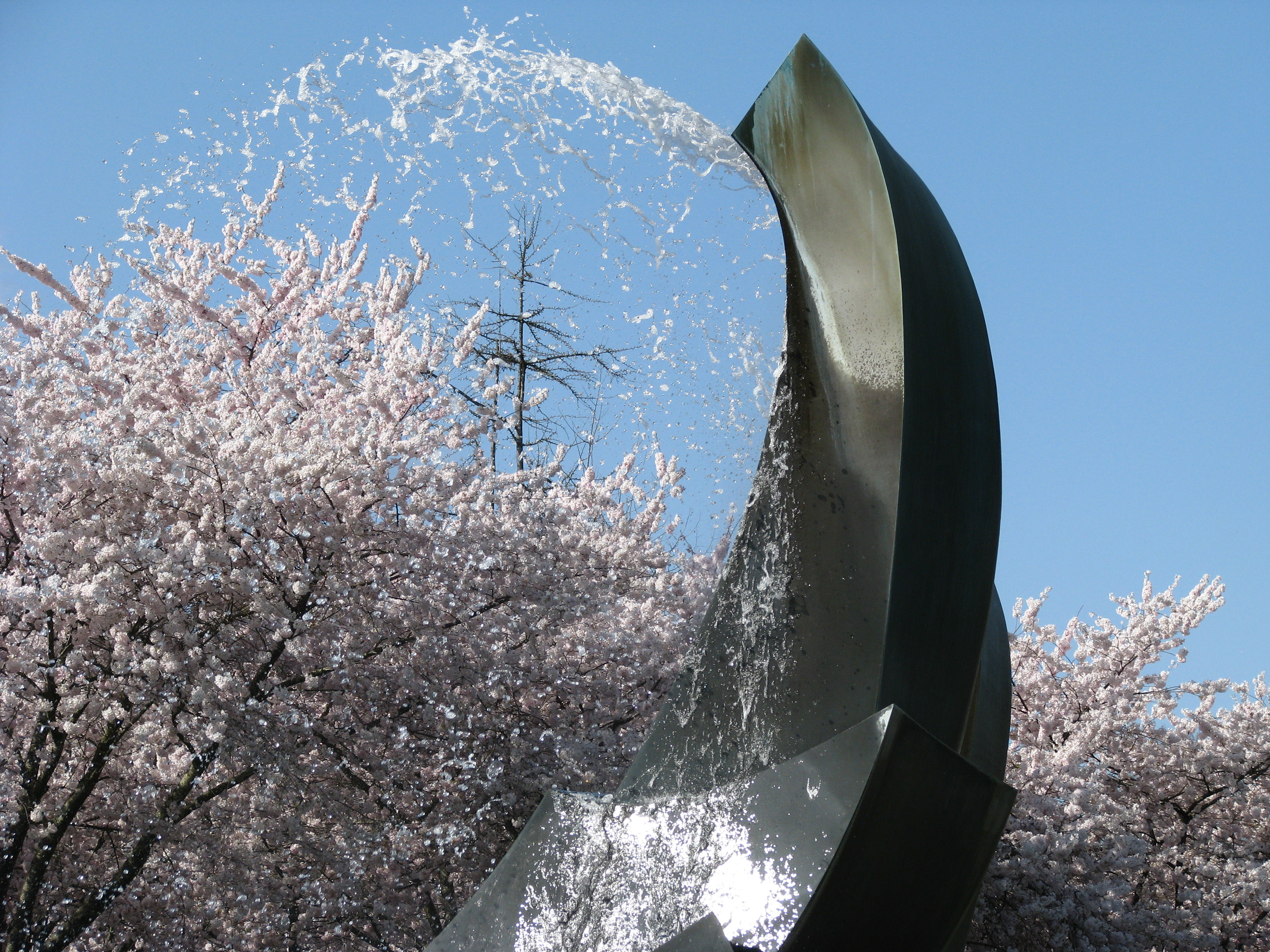
- The sculpture in 2010
- Medium: Bronze sculpture
- Location: Salem, Oregon, United States
- 44.940747°N 123.029268°W

Sprague Fountain, also known as the Capitol Fountain, is an outdoor bronze fountain and sculpture installed in the Capitol Mall area on the Oregon State Capitol grounds in Salem, Oregon, United States. The fountain was donated by Governor Charles A. Sprague to commemorate water and dedicated in 1980.

== See also ==
- 1980 in art
