= Tom McCall Memorial =

Sculpture in Salem, Oregon, U.S.

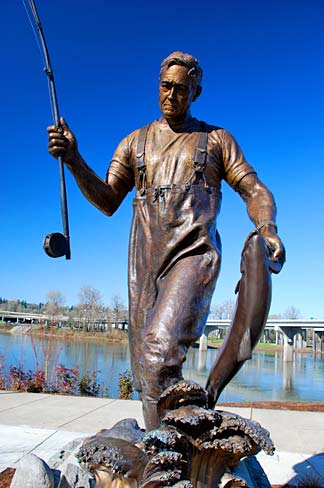
- The sculpture in 2010
- Artist: Rip Caswell
- Year: 2008
- Type: Sculpture
- Medium: Bronze
- Subject: Tom McCall
- Dimensions: 6.1 m (20 ft)
- Location: Salem, Oregon, United States; 44.94318°N 123.04271°W

Tom McCall Memorial is an outdoor bronze sculpture of former Oregon Governor Tom McCall by Rip Caswell, located in Salem, Oregon, in the United States.

== Description and history ==
The 20-foot (6.1 m) tall portrait statue, which depicts McCall wading through the Umpqua River with a fly rod and a steelhead fish, was commissioned by the Tom McCall Memorial Committee. It was installed along the Willamette River in Riverfront Park, dedicated on September 26, 2008, at a ceremony attended by Governor Ted Kulongoski.

== See also ==
- 2008 in art
