= Medal of Honor Monument =

Monument in Salem, Oregon, U.S.

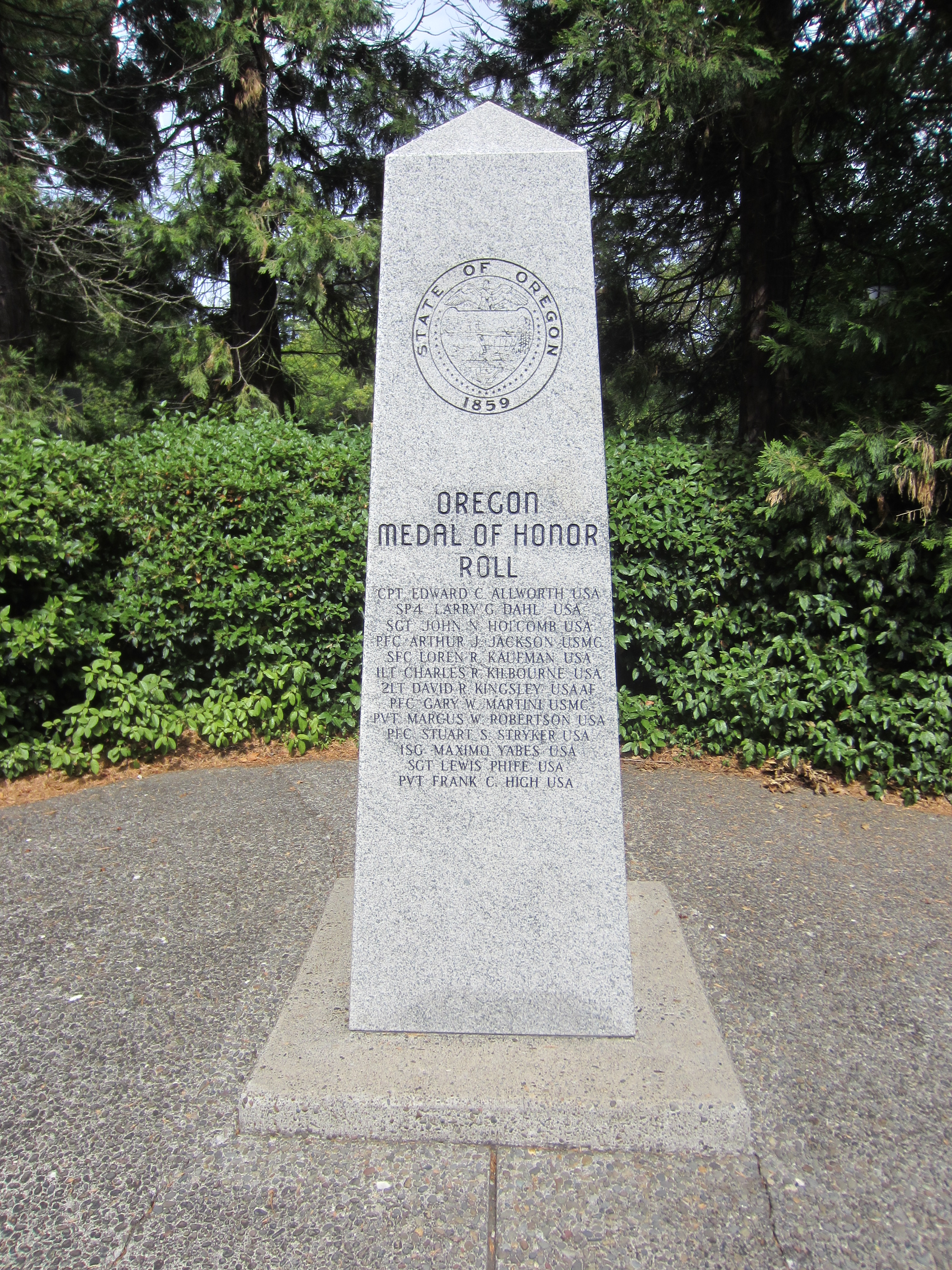
- The monument in 2018
- Location: Salem, Oregon, United States
- Coordinates: 44°56′43.8″N 123°1′36.0″W

The Medal of Honor Monument, also known as the Oregon Medal of Honor Roll, is a granite obelisk commemorating Oregon's Medal of Honor recipients, installed outside the Oregon Department of Veterans' Affairs Building in Salem, Oregon, United States. Cut from a step leading to the Oregon State Capitol, the memorial is a replica of the state's monument in the Medal of Honor Grove Freedom Foundation at Valley Forge, Pennsylvania.
