= Perry, Oregon =

Unincorporated community in the state of Oregon, United States

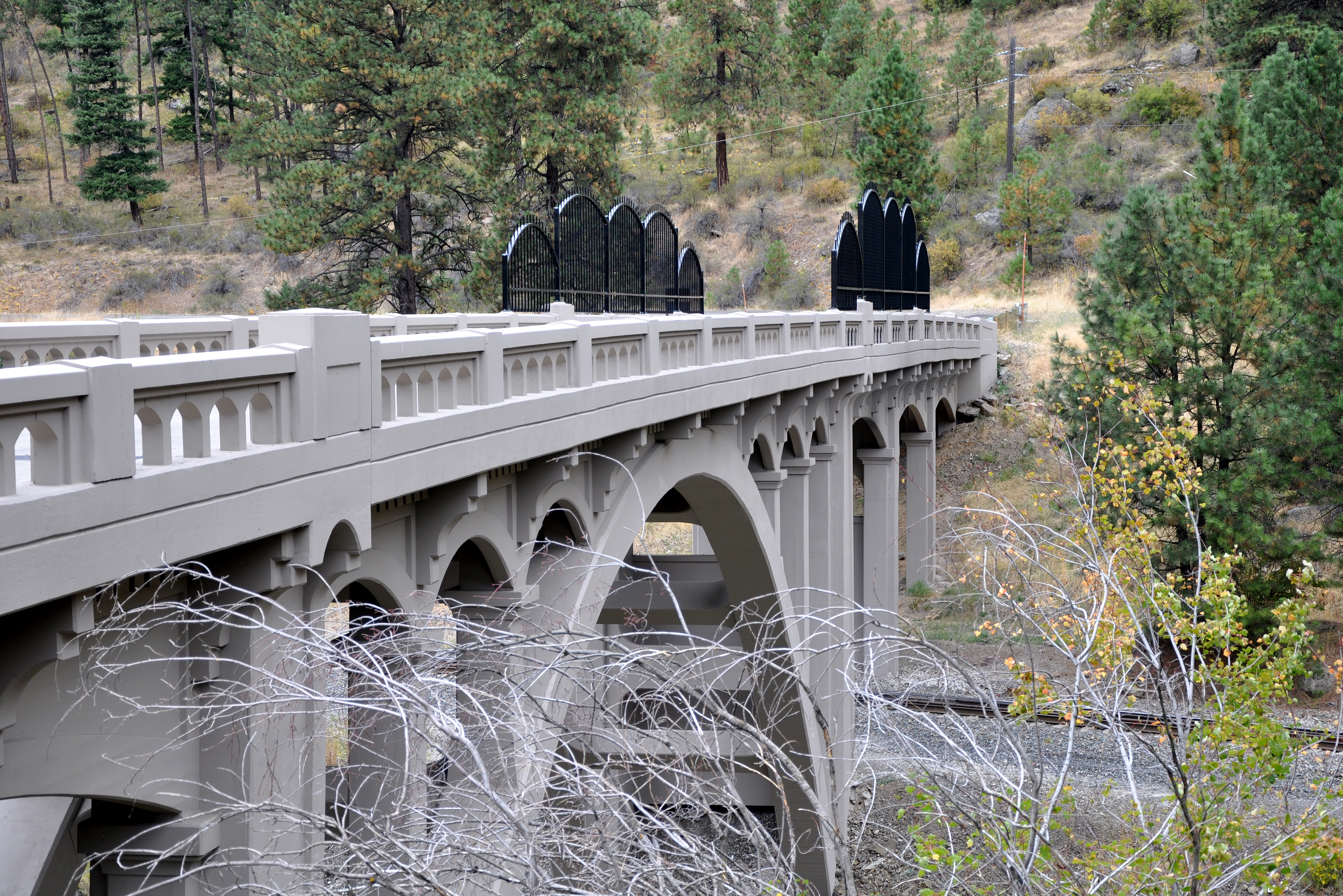
Bridge over Grande Ronde River at Perry.

Perry is an unincorporated community in Union County, Oregon, United States. It is located five miles west of La Grande on the Grande Ronde River and Interstate 84. The town was originally named Stumptown, but was later renamed in honor of an early railroad dispatcher in La Grande.

Perry is located at 45°20′53″N 118°10′01″W and has an elevation of 2,987 feet (910 meters).

Perry came into existence in 1890, when the Smith-Stanley Lumber Company built a sawmill in the area. A post office was established in the same year. The mill was sold to Charley and Jim Mimnaugh and again in 1900 to C.W. Nibley and George Stoddard, who renamed the mill the Grande Ronde Lumber Company. In 1927, the Grande Ronde Lumber Company merged with the Stoddard Lumber Company of Baker City and moved across the valley to Pondosa, taking most of the town with it. The post office was discontinued in 1931.
