= Minto-Brown Island Park =

Park in Oregon, United States

- Interactive map of Minto-Brown Island Park
- Location: Salem, Oregon
- Coordinates: 44.9226°N 123.0685451°W
- Area: 1,200 acres (490 ha)

Minto-Brown Island Park is the largest park in Salem, Oregon, United States.

== History ==
In 1857, Isaac Brown established his home on what came to be known as Brown's Island, near the west bank of the Willamette River. There Brown raised livestock, farm produce, and tobacco. In 1867, John Minto purchased and cleared land on an island near the east bank, turning it into productive farmland. That island would later come to be named Minto Island. Due to flooding, the land those two men settled are no longer true islands. The area is still subject to periodic flooding, which prevents it from being developed. Instead, restoration projects have added thousands of trees and converted many agricultural acres to native plantings. This prevents soil erosion, improves wildlife habitat, and promotes water quality.

== Features ==
The park has a playground, a reservable shelter, walking, jogging and bike trails, picnic areas, a dog park, several fishing spots, and a paddle boat area.

== Future development ==
In 2013, a purchase of 307 acres (124 ha) of Boise Cascade property was added to the existing 898-acre (363 ha) park for a total of 1,205 acres (488 ha). The property is the landing point for the Peter Courtney Pedestrian Bridge from Riverfront Park, completed in 2016. As of 2015, additional paved trails are being planned and a new master plan is being developed.
