= Eco-Earth Globe =

Sculpture in Salem, Oregon, U.S.

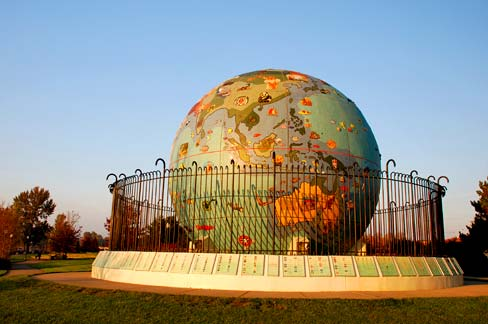
- The sculpture in 2007
- Year: 2003
- Type: Sculpture
- Subject: Globe
- Dimensions: 7.9 m diameter (26 ft)
- Location: Salem, Oregon, United States; 44.93879°N 123.04424°W

Eco-Earth Globe, sometimes referred to simply as Eco Earth, is an outdoor sculpture depicting a globe, located in Riverfront Park in Salem, Oregon, in the United States. Completed in 2003, the globe was converted from an acid storage ball with a 26-foot (7.9 m) diameter that previously belonged to Boise Cascade, a pulp and paper company. Conceived by Mayor Roger Gertenrich, the community art project was funded by community members. According to Oregon Public Broadcasting, the sculpture "was an opportunity for students, and talented volunteers from Salem's art community to collaborate and create hundreds of ceramic icons that represent and teach about different cultures". Mary P. D. Heintzman, a local art teacher and artist, served as the project's art director.

== See also ==
- 2003 in art
