= Town and Gown (Sponenburgh) =

1991 sculpture by Mark Sponenburgh by Salem, Oregon, U.S.

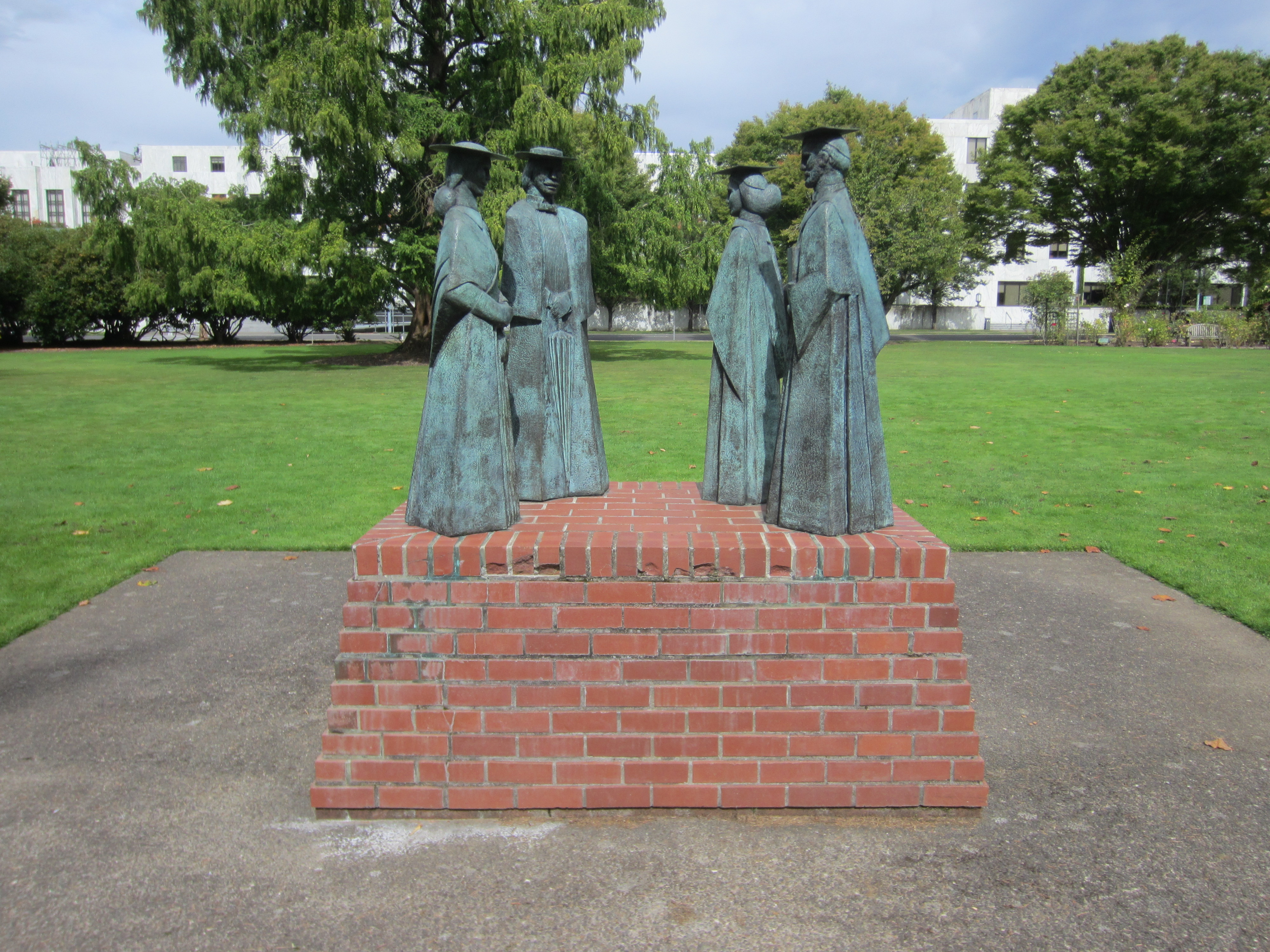
- The artwork in 2018
- Artist: Mark Sponenburgh
- Year: 1991
- Medium: Bronze sculpture
- Location: Salem, Oregon, United States
- 44.93733°N 123.03063°W

Town and Gown is an outdoor 1991 bronze sculpture by Mark Sponenburgh, installed on the north side of the Willamette University campus in Salem, Oregon, United States.

== Description ==
Town and Gown depicts four people: two academics and two townspeople. The academics wear caps and gowns; the man carries a book and the female holds a branch. The two female townspeople wear capes, dresses, and hats; one carries a purse and the other holds an umbrella. The statues each measure approximately 50 x 18 x 12 inches, and the brick base measures approximately 33 x 80 x 55 inches.

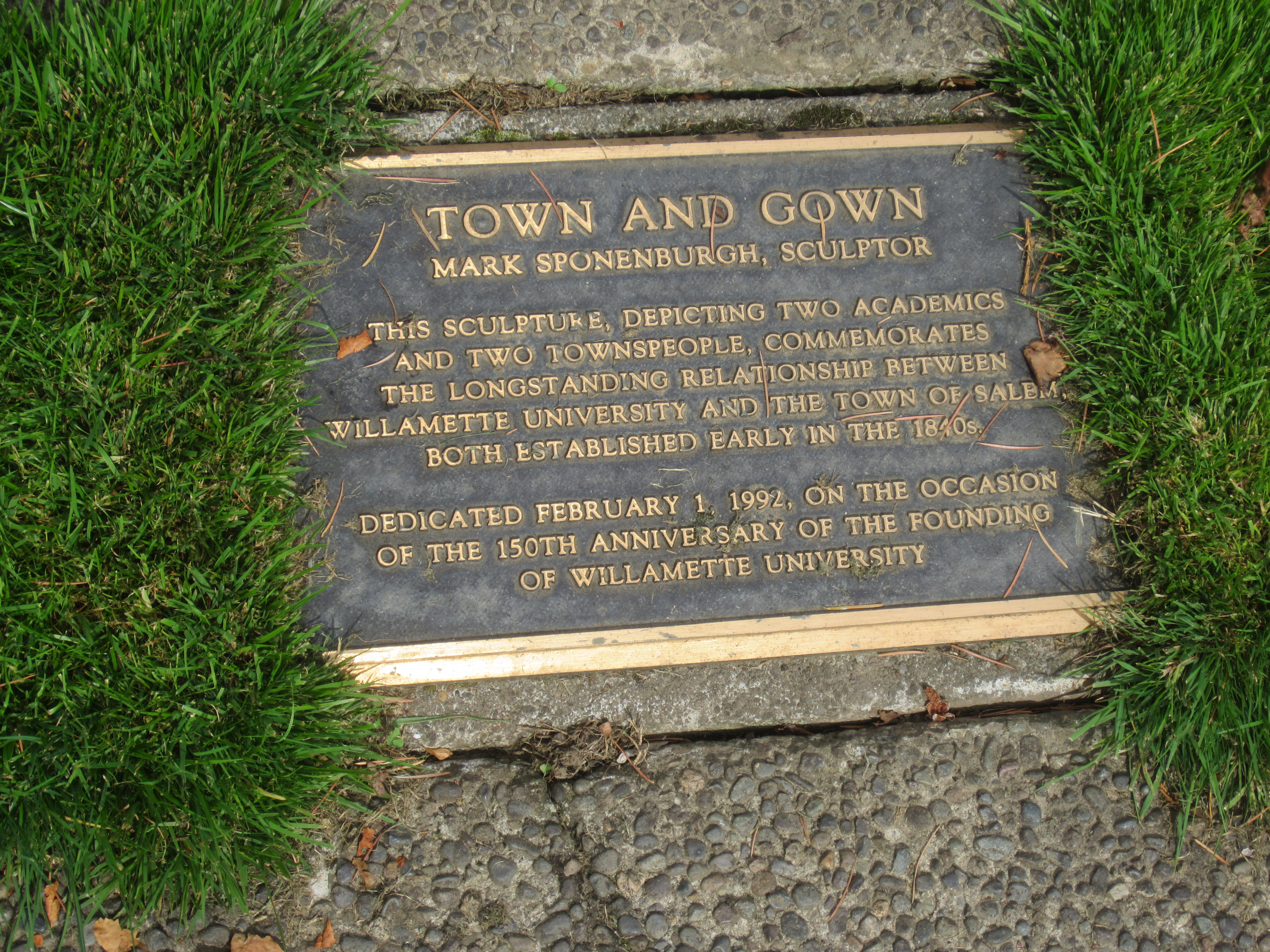
Plaque for the sculpture

The plaque reads: TOWN AND GOWN / MARK SPONENBURGH, SCULPTOR / THIS SCULPTURE, DEPICTING TWO ACADEMICS / AND TWO TOWNSPEOPLE, COMMEMORATES / THE LONGSTANDING RELATIONSHIP BETWEEN / WILLAMETTE UNIVERSITY AND THE TOWN OF SALEM, / BOTH ESTABLISHED EARLY IN THE 1840S. / DEDICATED FEBRUARY 1, 1992, ON THE OCCASION / OF THE 150TH ANNIVERSARY OF THE FOUNDING OF WILLAMETTE UNIVERSITY.

== History ==
The sculpture was presented to commemorate the university's sesquicentennial, and was dedicated on February 1, 1992.

Town and Gown was surveyed by the Smithsonian Institution's "Save Outdoor Sculpture!" program in 1993.

== See also ==
- 1991 in art
