= Marion County Courthouse (Oregon) =

Courthouse in Salem, Oregon, United States

Coordinates: 44.9399°N 123.0361°W

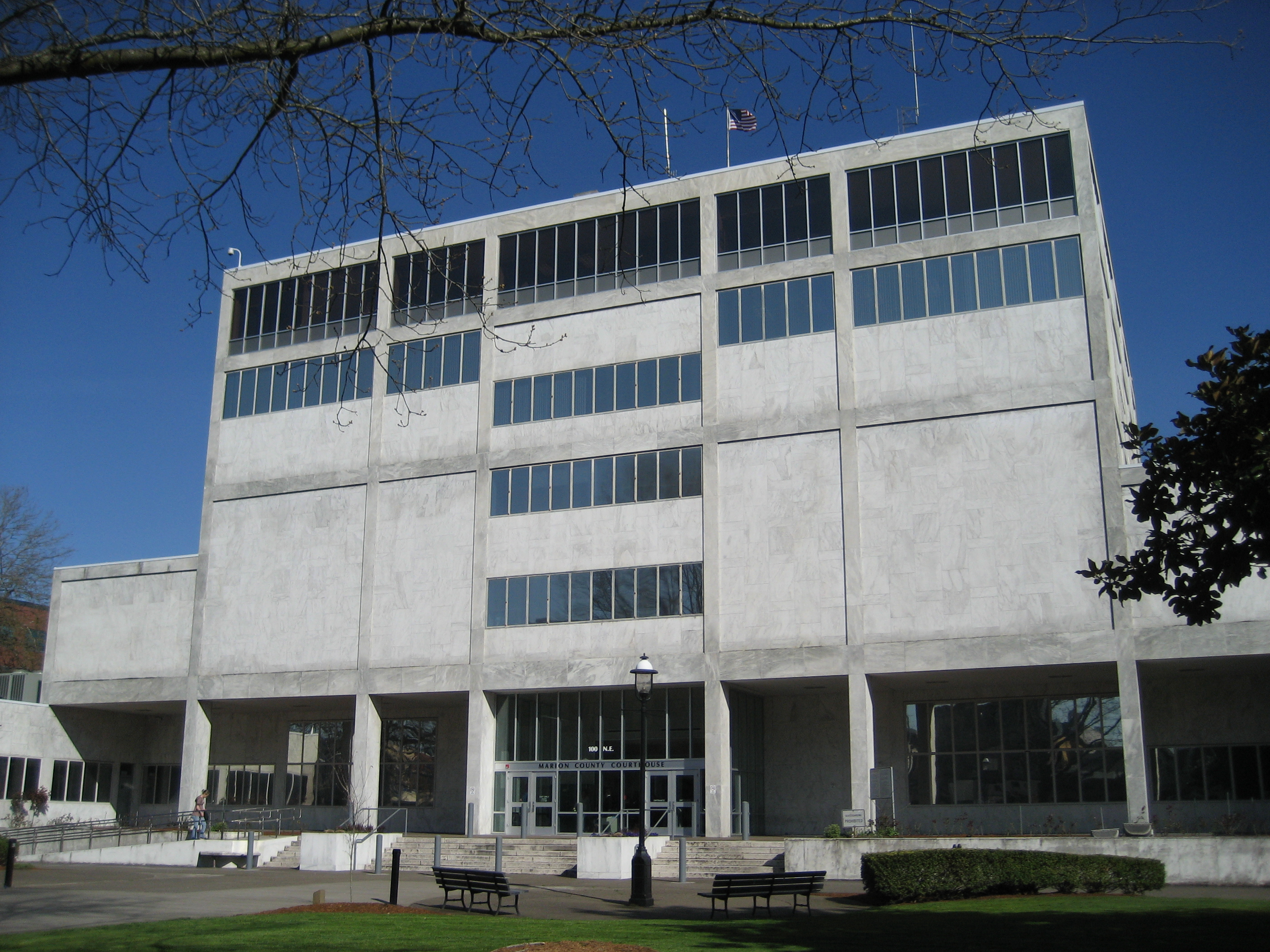
The building's exterior in 2008

The Marion County Courthouse is located in Salem, Oregon, United States.

The building underwent repairs in 2006 after being damaged by a truck.

== See also ==
- World War I Memorial (Salem, Oregon)
