= Oregon Veterans Medal of Honor Memorial =

Memorial in Salem, Oregon, U.S.

- United States
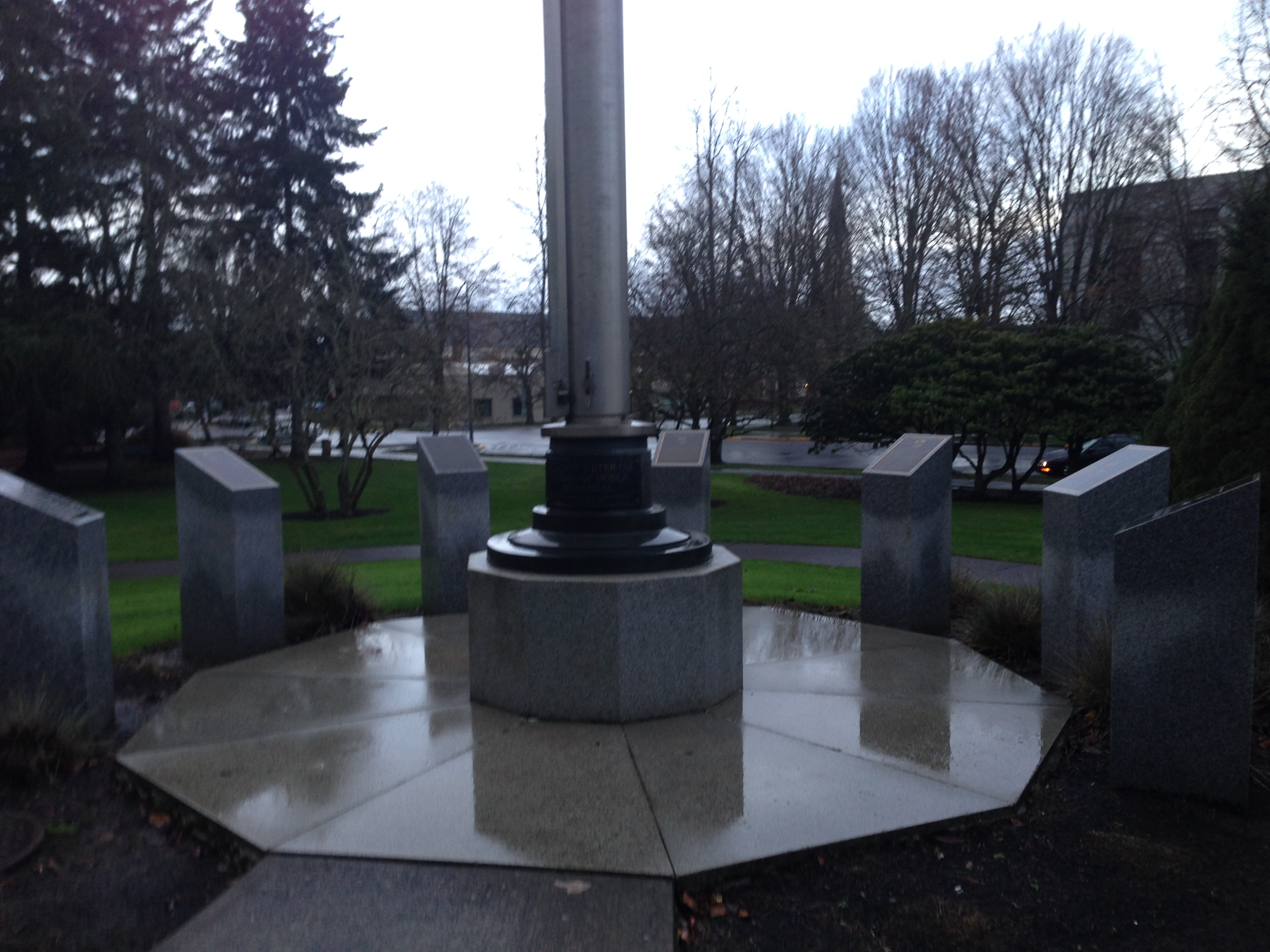
- The memorial in 2015
- For All veterans, and especially Medal of Honor recipients
- Established: 2003
- Location: 44.938472°N 123.029537°W; State Capitol State Park, Salem, Oregon, U.S.
- Commemorated: Thirteen Medal of Honor recipients from Oregon

The Oregon Veterans Medal of Honor Memorial, or Oregon's Medal of Honor Memorial, is an outdoor memorial commemorating all veterans, and especially Medal of Honor recipients, installed outside the Oregon State Capitol in Salem, Oregon, United States.

== Description ==
The memorial features seven granite pillars on each side of the Oregon State Capitol. East of the building, the pillars surround a flagpole with the American flag, and on the opposite side, the pillars encompass a flagpole with the state flag. Thirteen pillars have a bronze plaque depicting one of thirteen Medal of Honor recipients from Oregon; the fourteenth one lists the names of medal recipients with a connection to the state, but who did not enlist in Oregon. Bob Maxwell's name appears on the fourteenth pillar.

== History ==
The monument was erected by the Oregon State Capitol Foundation and Oregon Veterans Group in 2003.

== See also ==
- Oregon Department of Veterans' Affairs
- Oregon World War II Memorial
- 2003 in art
- Kentucky Medal of Honor Memorial
- Medal of Honor Memorial (Indianapolis)
- Texas Medal of Honor Memorial
