= Capitol Beaver Family =

Sculpture in Salem, Oregon, U.S.

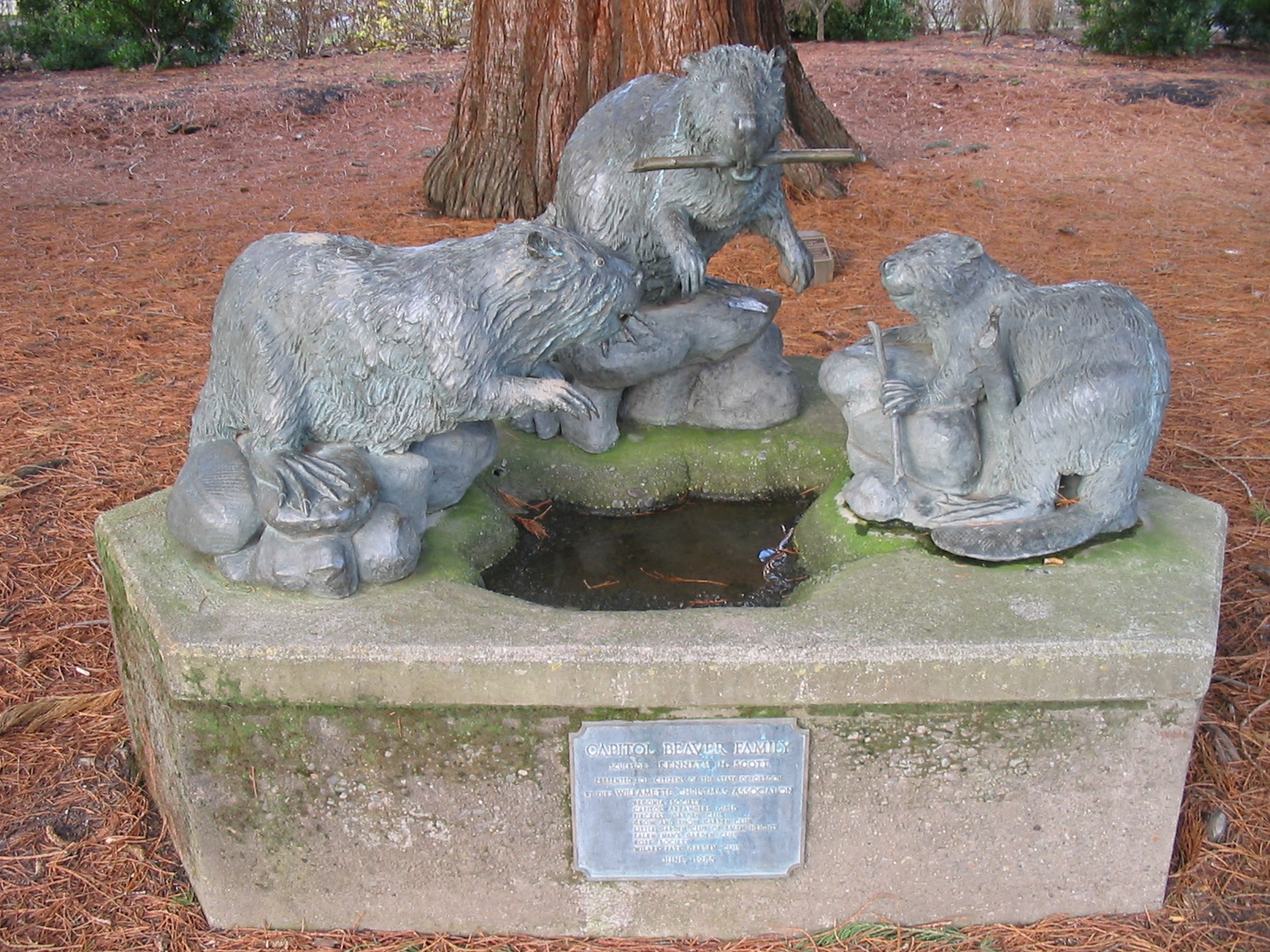
- The sculptural group in 2004
- Artist: Kenneth M. Scott
- Year: 1985
- Medium: Bronze sculpture
- Subject: Beavers
- Location: Salem, Oregon, United States
- 44.939293°N 123.031886°W

Capitol Beaver Family is a 1985 bronze sculpture depicting three beavers by artist Kenneth M. Scott, installed outside the Oregon State Capitol, in Salem, Oregon, United States. It was donated by the Willamette Christmas Association.

== Description ==
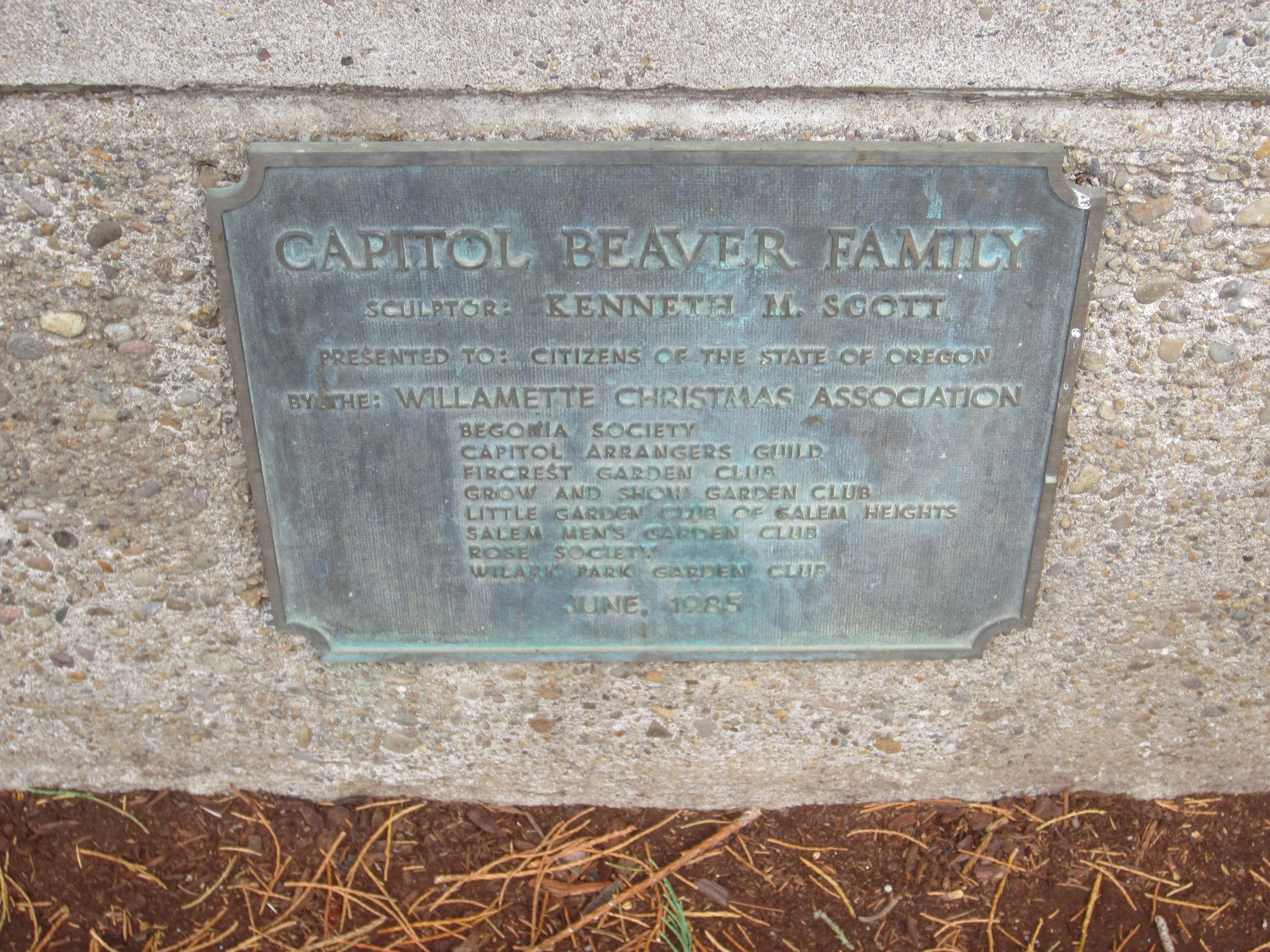
Plaque for the sculpture

The sculpture measures approximately 3 ft, 2 in. x 58 in. x 48 in., and rests on a concrete base that measures 23 x 70 x 58 in. An inscription on a plaque installed on the south side of the base reads:

CAPITOL BEAVER FAMILY
SCULPTOR: KENNETH M. SCOTT
PRESENTED TO: CITIZENS OF THE STATE OF OREGON
BY THE WILLAMETTE CHRISTMAS ASSOCIATION
BEGONIA SOCIETY
CAPITOL ARRANGERS GUILD
FIRECREST GARDEN CLUB
GROW AND SHOW GARDEN CLUB
LITTLE GARDEN CLUB OF SALEM HEIGHTS
SALEM MEN'S GARDEN CLUB
ROSE SOCIETY
WILARK PARK GARDEN CLUB
JUNE 1985

== History ==
The sculpture's condition was deemed "treatment needed" by Smithsonian Institution's "Save Outdoor Sculpture!" program in September 1992.

== See also ==
- 1985 in art
