= Frank H. Schwarz =

American painter

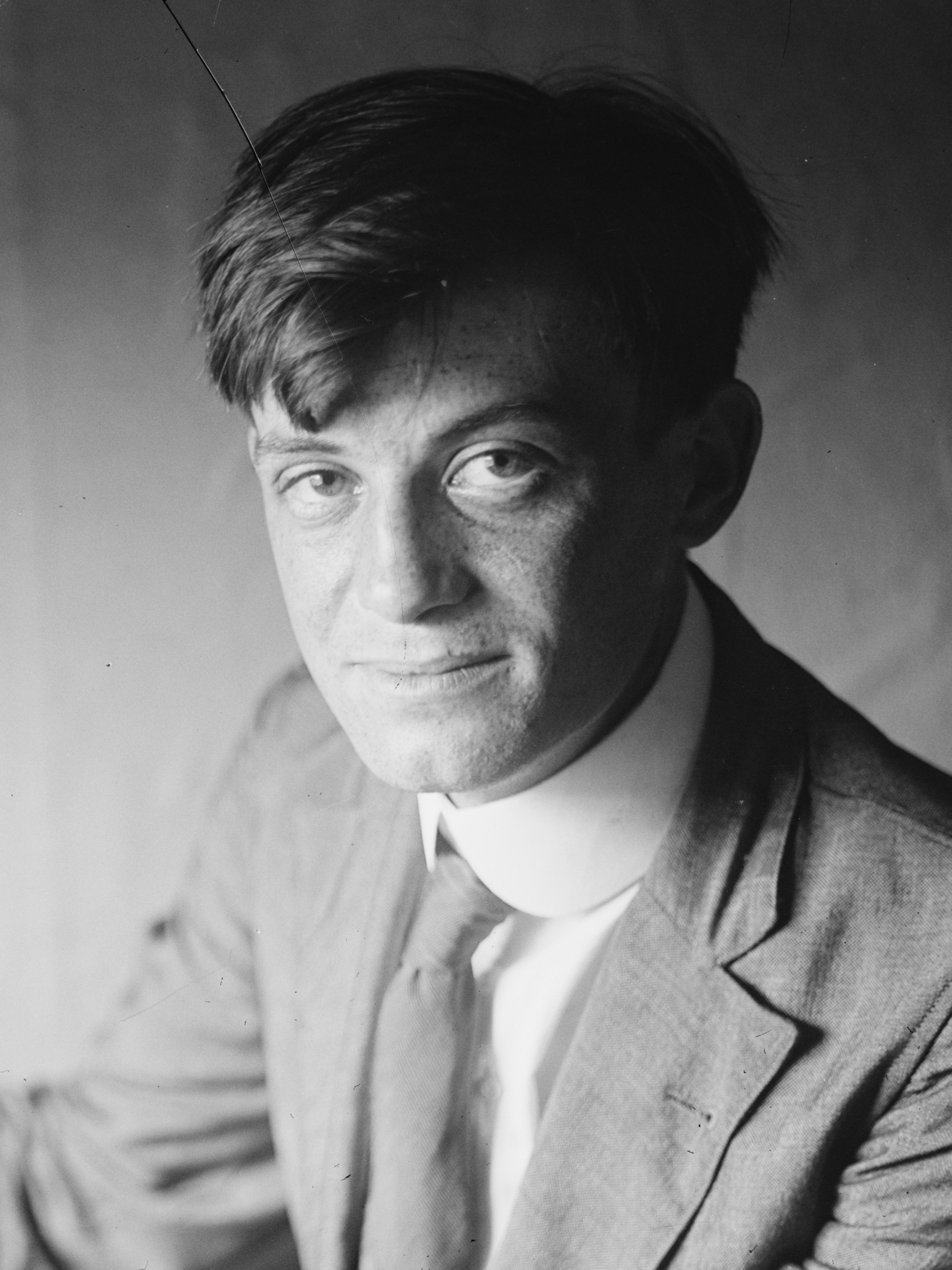
- Franz Schwarz in the early 1920s
- Born: June 21, 1894; New York City
- Died: September 5, 1951 (aged 57); Mount Vernon, New York
- Known for: Painter and muralist
- Awards: Rome Prize

Frank Henry Schwarz (21 June 1894 – 5 September 1951) was an American painter and muralist.

== Biography ==
Schwarz was born in New York City on 21 June 1894. Later Schwarz's family lived in Chicago, Illinois. When Schwarz's mother died, his father, Frank, returned to New York City, but Schwarz stayed in Chicago to continue his studies at an art school there. Later he served in the Army.

In 1921, he was awarded a fellowship in painting, the Rome Prize, from the American Academy in Rome for his work "Heroism". The prize not only saved an ill Schwarz from eviction, it also allowed him to reunite with his father, who had lost touch with him for six years.

Schwarz became a Guggenheim Fellow in Fine Arts in 1926.

In 1929, the Brooklyn Museum purchased Schwarz's work "Lugietta".

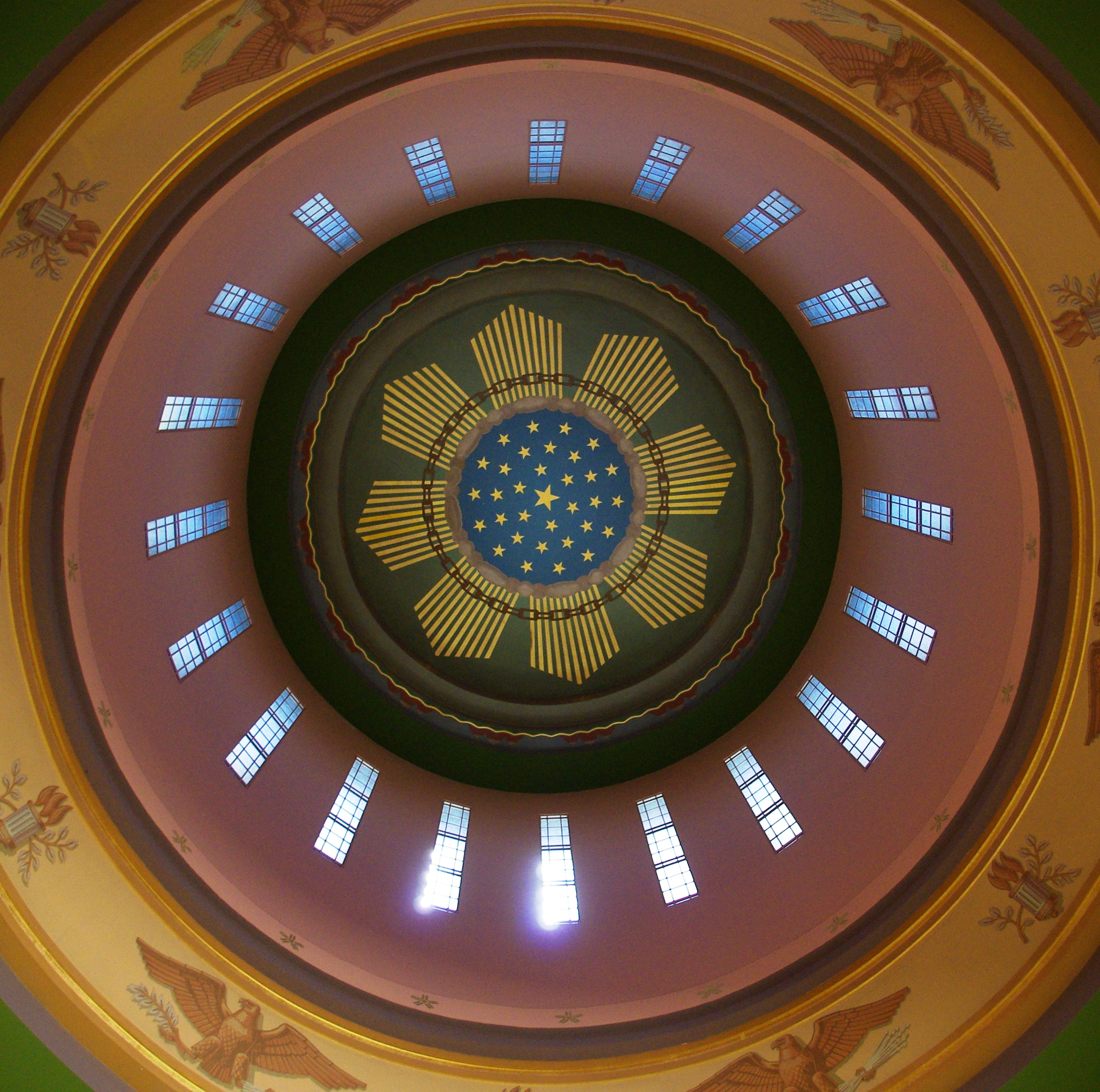
Interior of the dome of the Oregon State Capitol painted by Frank H. Schwarz

Several of Schwarz's murals decorate the 1938 Oregon State Capitol, including two large ones in the rotunda, one depicting Lewis and Clark at Celilo Falls, and one depicting an 1843 wagon train: "On the Oregon Trail". Another of his murals is in the Senate chamber behind the Presidents's desk, "Bringing the News to Salem March 17, 1859", depicts the announcement of Oregon's statehood. Schwarz and the capitol's other muralist, Barry Faulkner, painted their murals at Schwarz's New York studio where they could compare color and highlighting. The artists traveled to Oregon to supervise the installation of their work. Schwarz also painted the interior of the rotunda's cupola.

Other works by Schwarz include the six icons above the main altar and the Stations of the Cross at the Church of the Ascension of Our Lord in Westmount, Quebec, Canada, and an altar triptych, "The Adoration of the Peasants", in the Island Chapel at Nazareth Hall Preparatory Seminary in Saint Paul, Minnesota. The altarpiece was removed from the chapel when Nazareth Hall was sold to Northwestern College in 1970.

Schwarz was a life member of the National Arts Club.

He died in Mount Vernon, New York on 5 September 1951.
