= Liberty Bell (Oregon State Capitol) =

Replica bell in Salem, Oregon, U.S.

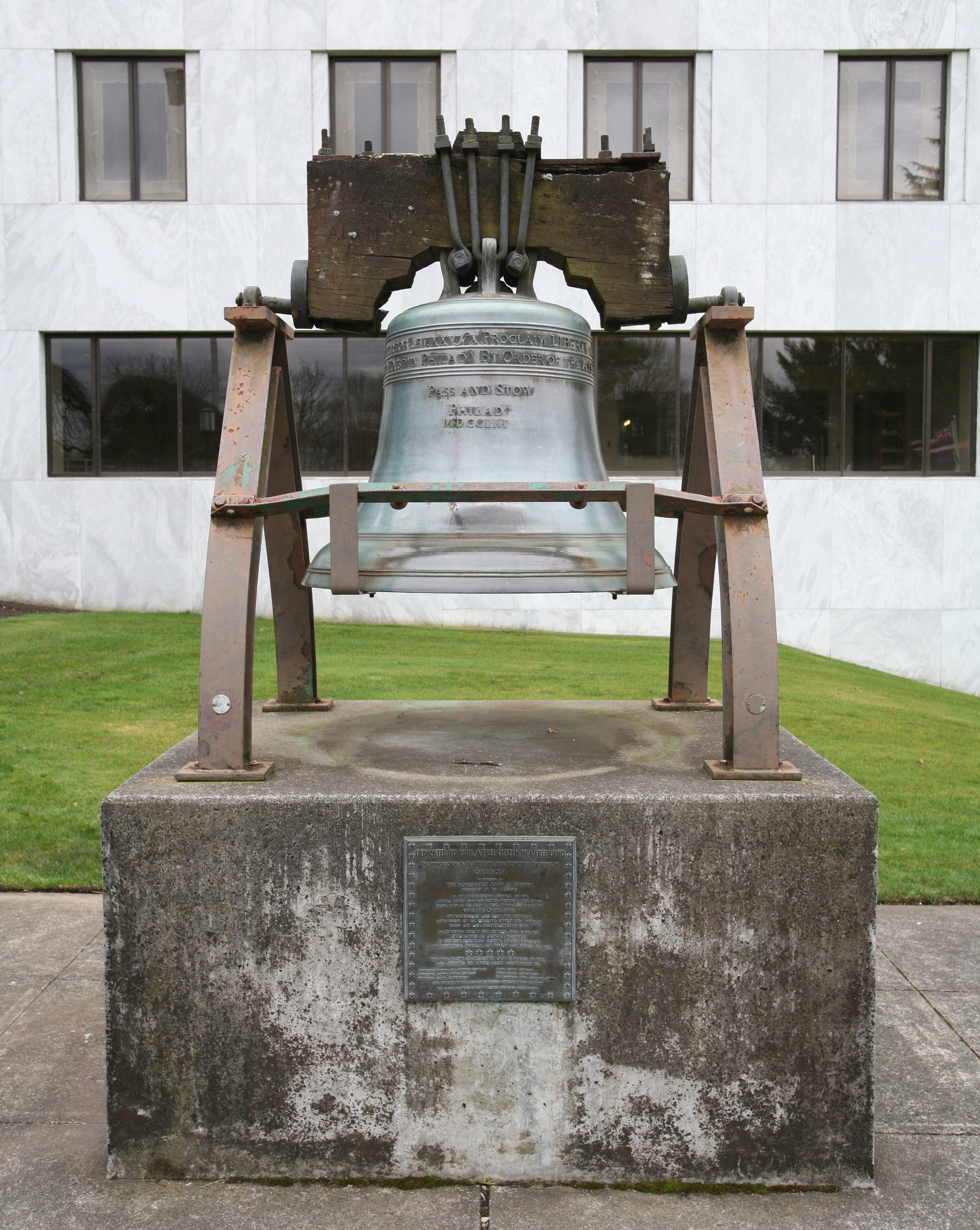
- The bell in 2008
- Subject: Liberty Bell
- Location: Salem, Oregon, United States
- 44.938725°N 123.031337°W

The Liberty Bell installed outside the Oregon State Capitol's west entrance, in Salem, Oregon, is a replica of the Liberty Bell in Philadelphia, Pennsylvania. The bell was presented to Oregon on July 4, 1950, by John Snyder, an American businessman and federal government official who served as United States Secretary of the Treasury in President Harry S. Truman's administration, to promote savings bonds.

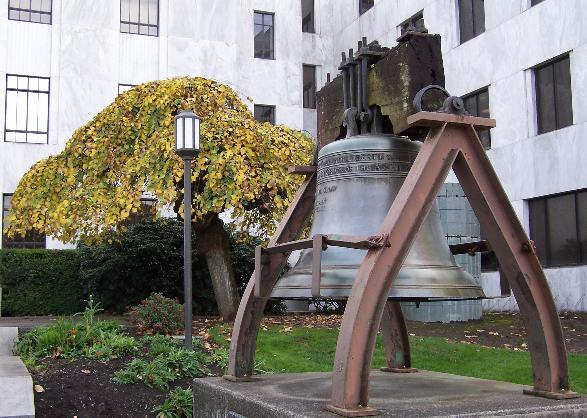
The bell in 2006

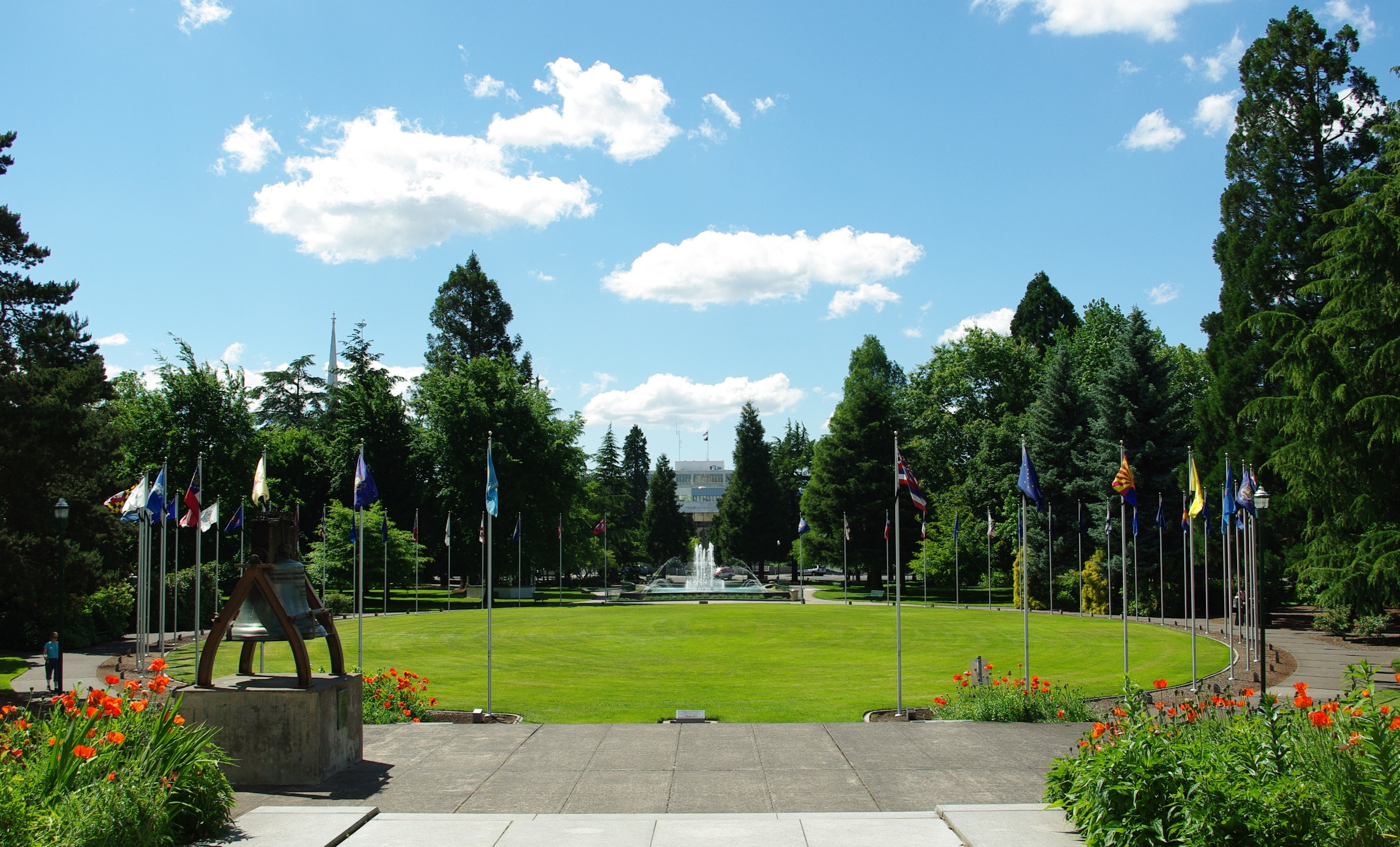
The Walk of Flags with the Liberty Bell in the foreground, 2008

== See also ==
- 1950 in art
- Liberty Bell (Portland, Oregon)
