= Walk of Flags =

Coordinates: 44.93889°N 123.03200°W

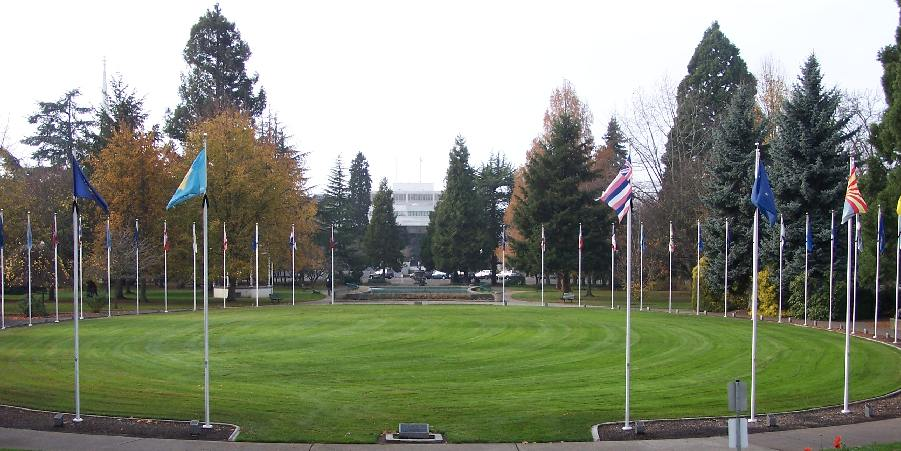
The Walk of Flags in 2006

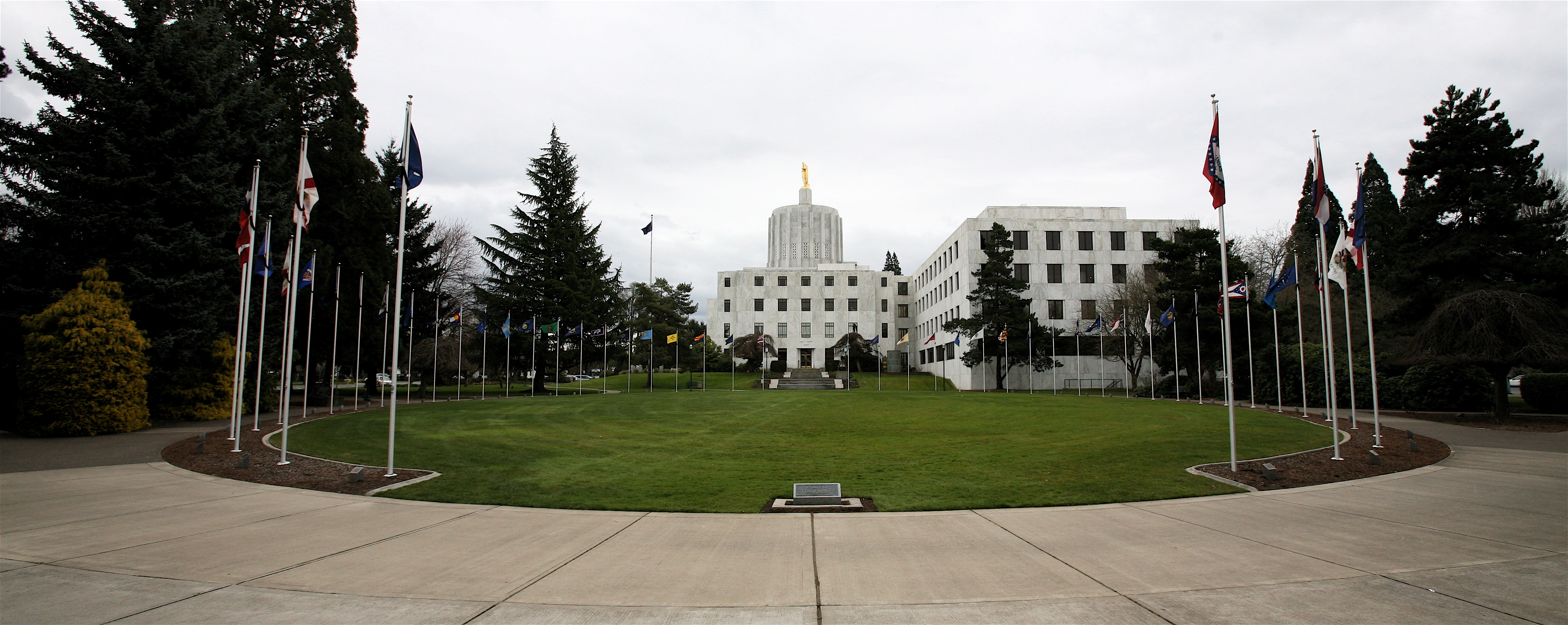
The Walk of Flags with the Oregon State Capitol in the background, 2008

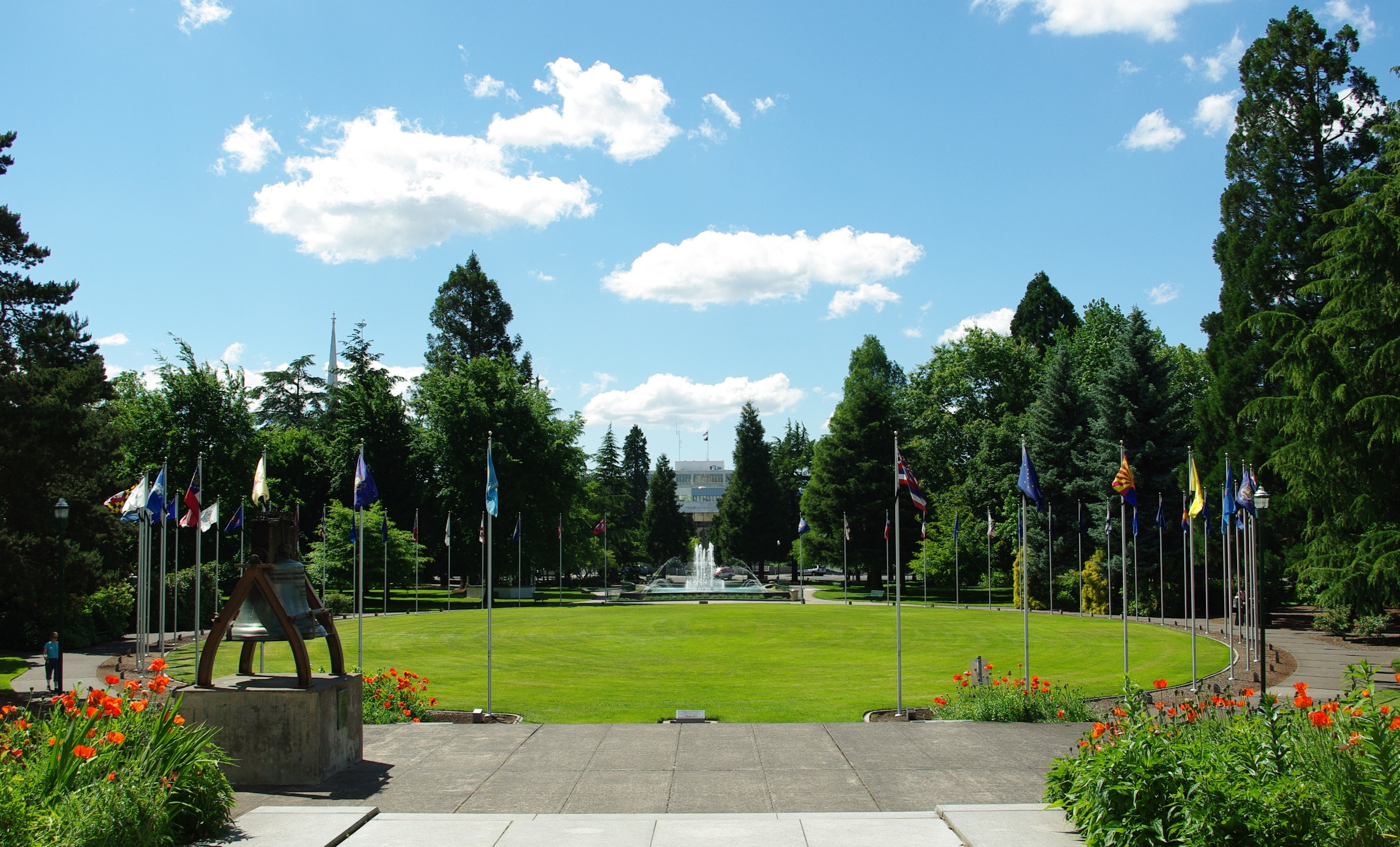
The Walk of Flags with the Liberty Bell in the foreground in 2008

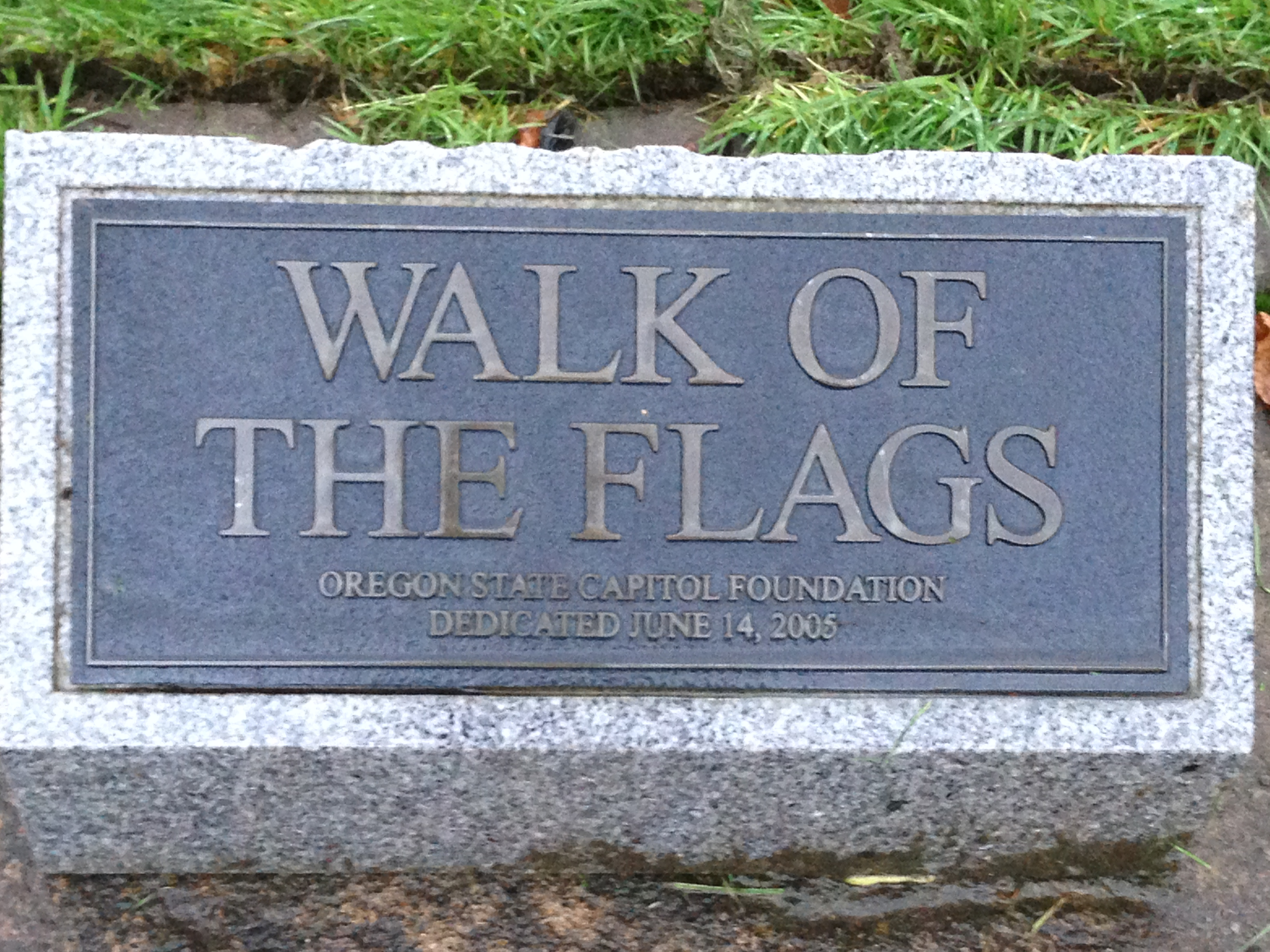
Plaque

The Walk of Flags, or Walk of the Flags, is located in Willson Park, on the Oregon State Capitol grounds, in Salem, Oregon, United States. It features the flags of the U.S. states, displayed in the order in which they were admitted to the Union.

== History ==
The "walk" was dedicated on June 14, 2005, and the nine flags of Oregon's federally recognized Native American tribes were added as a separate display in 2009. These tribes include: Burns Paiute Tribe, Confederated Tribes of Coos, Lower Umpqua and Siuslaw, Coquille Indian Tribe, Cow Creek Band of Umpqua Tribe of Indians, Confederated Tribes of the Grand Ronde Community, Klamath Tribes, Confederated Tribes of Siletz Indians, Confederated Tribes of the Umatilla Indian Reservation, and the Confederated Tribes of Warm Springs.

The Oregon Legislative Assembly voted to remove the flag of Mississippi because of its Confederate emblem in 2016, but it was returned after the state flag was changed in 2021.
