= Waite Fountain =

Fountain in Salem, Oregon, U.S.

Coordinates: 44.93904°N 123.03267°W

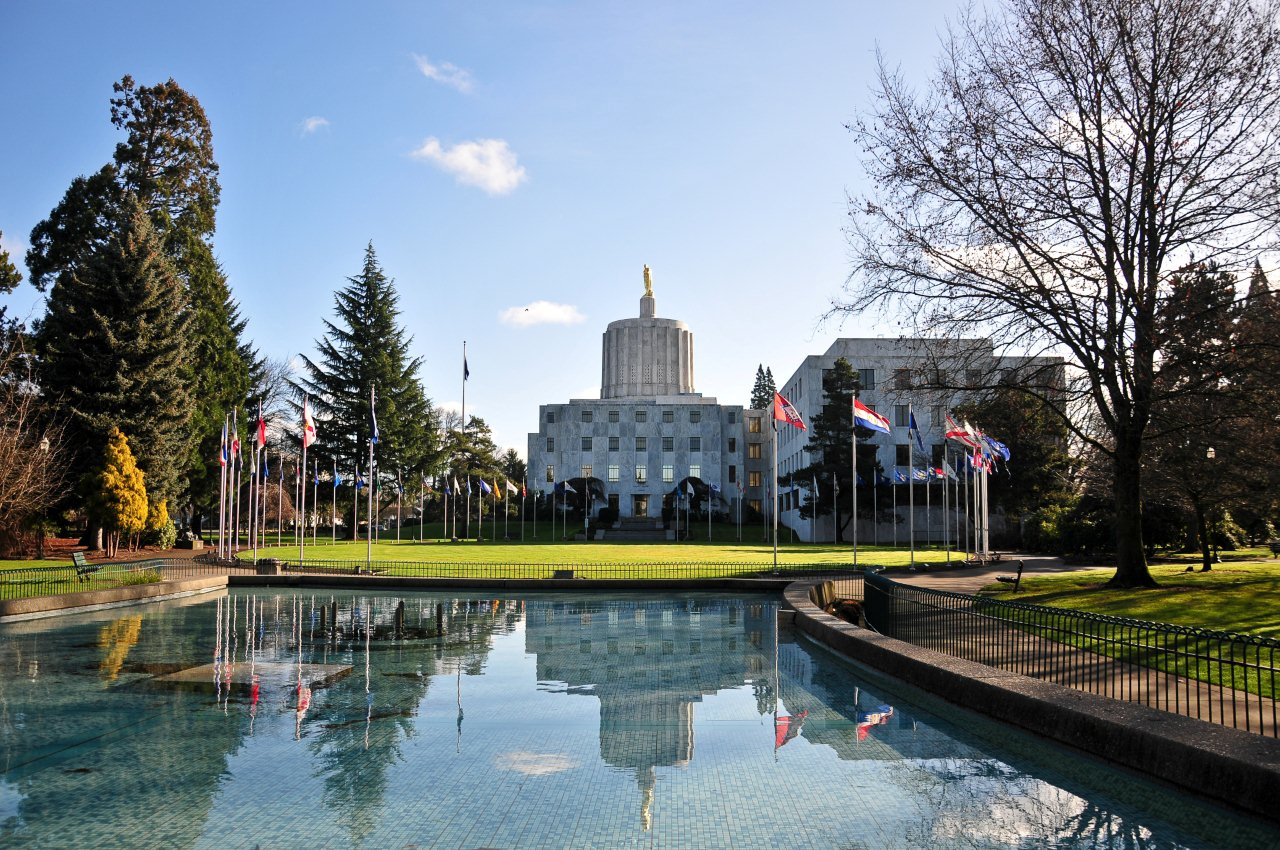
- Year: 1912
- Medium: Sculpture
- Location: Salem, Oregon,

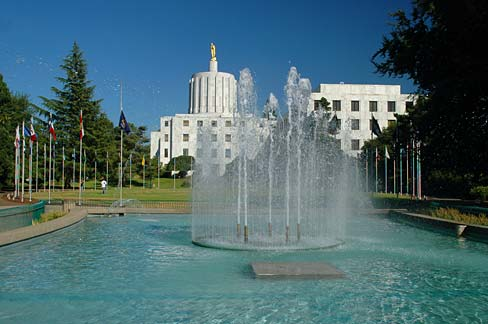
The fountain in 2006

Waite Fountain was an outdoor fountain installed on the Oregon State Capitol grounds, in Salem, Oregon, United States. The original cylindrical fountain was erected in 1912. It was damaged during the Columbus Day Storm of 1962, and was replaced by a low, modern pool fountain. A plague on the base of the fountain read, "The E . M Waite Memorial Fountain." The fountain was demolished in 2026 as the surrounding Willson Park undergoes substantial improvements.

The original fountain was created by June D. Drake.

== See also ==
- 1912 in art
