= Breyman Fountain =

Fountain in Salem, Oregon, U.S.

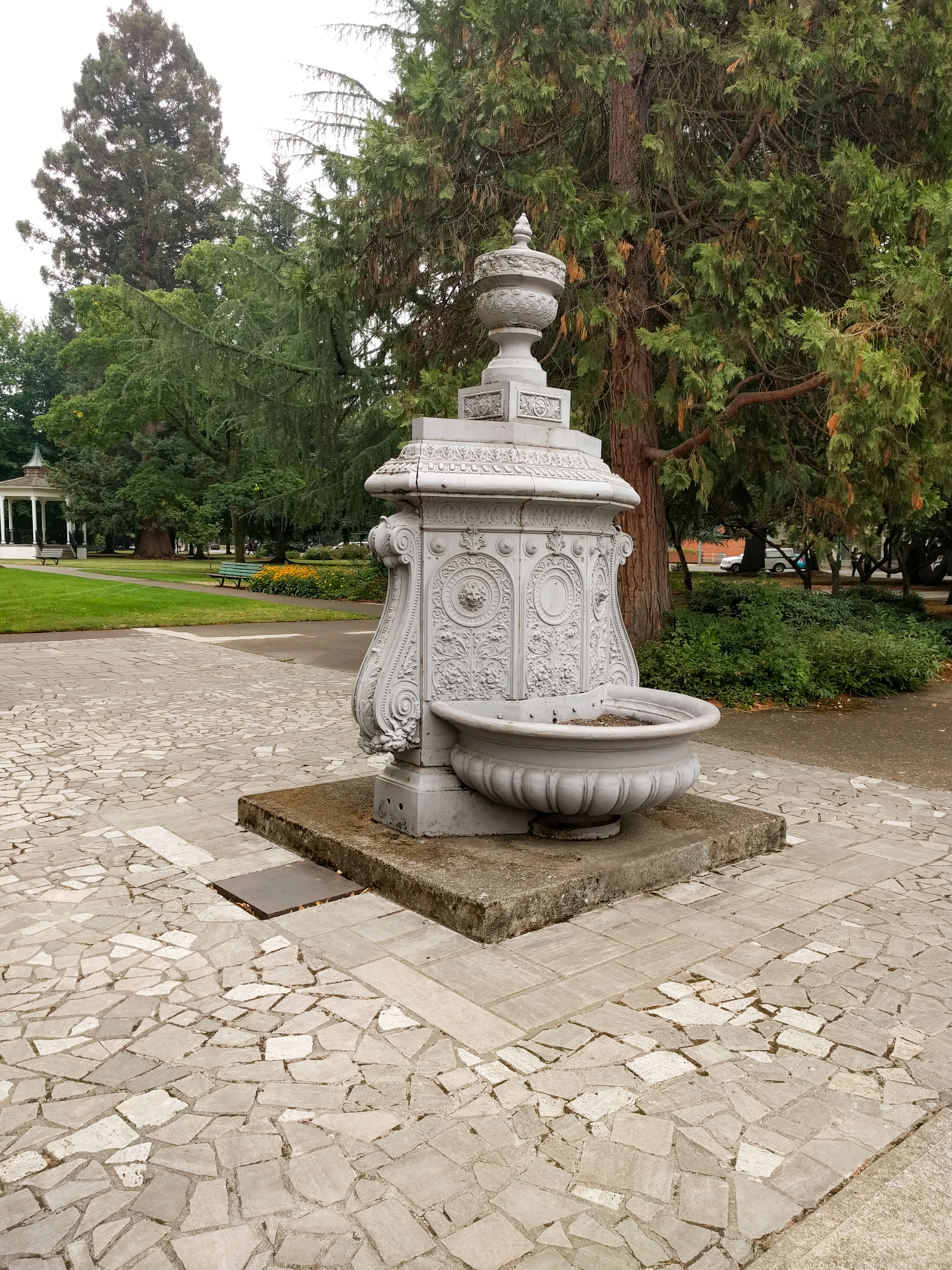
- The fountain in 2017
- Year: 1904
- Location: Salem, Oregon, United States
- 44.93925°N 123.03348°W

Breyman Fountain, also known as the Breyman Brothers Fountain and Breyman Horse Trough, is an outdoor fountain by an unknown sculptor, installed in Willson Park, on the grounds of the Oregon State Capitol, in Salem, Oregon, United States.

== Description ==
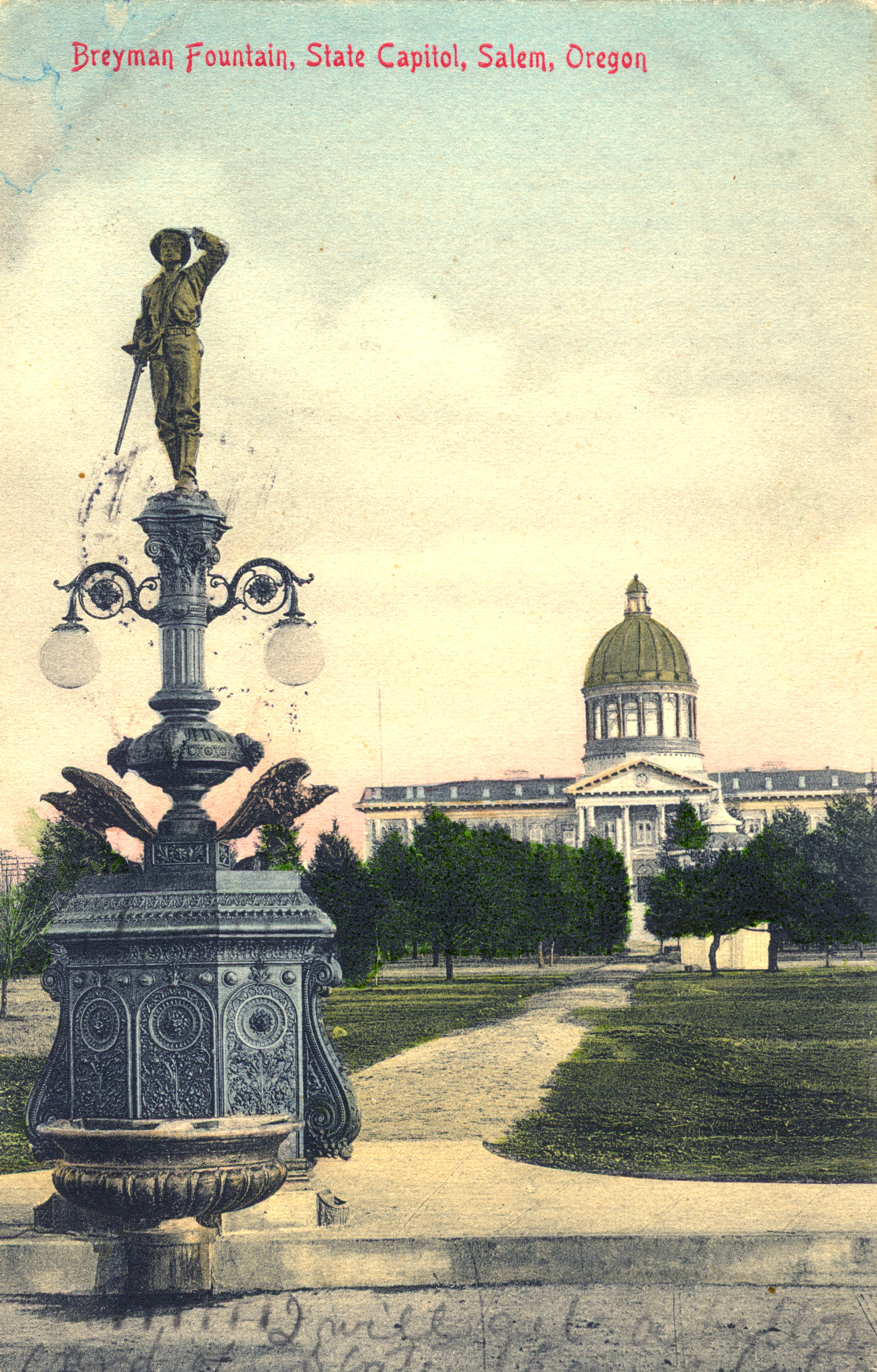
Illustration of the fountain in the foreground and Oregon State Capitol in the background

The Smithsonian Institution described the fountain as abstract and "ornate". The metal fountain measures approximately 10 feet (3.0 m) x 78 inches (2.0 m) x 70 inches (1.8 m), and rests on a concrete base that measures approximately 6 inches (15 cm) x 85 inches (220 cm) x 84 inches (210 cm). An inscription on the upper back part of the fountain reads: "PRESENTED TO THE CITY OF SALEM OREGON / BY / BREYMAN BROTHERS / 1904".

The fountain originally served as a watering trough for horses and, according to the Oregon Parks and Recreation Department, remains Willson Park's only historic structure from the era of the second capitol building.

== History ==
The fountain was donated to the city of Salem by the family of businessman Werner Breyman in 1904, and installed near Cottage Street as a memorial to pioneers. It was visible from the homes of both Breyman brothers.

In the late 1930s, a statue installed atop the fountain was put into storage and went missing. In the 1950s, a sculpture of an eagle replaced the doughboy statue, and flowers grew where horses once drank. According to family members, the sculptures adorning the fountain were melted and used as scrap metal during World War II.

The fountain's condition was undetermined by the Smithsonian Institution's "Save Outdoor Sculpture!" program in August 1993. It was administered by the Oregon Department of Administrative Services at the time.

== See also ==
- 1904 in art
