= Oregon State Capitol =

State capitol building of Oregon, US

- U.S. National Register of Historic Places
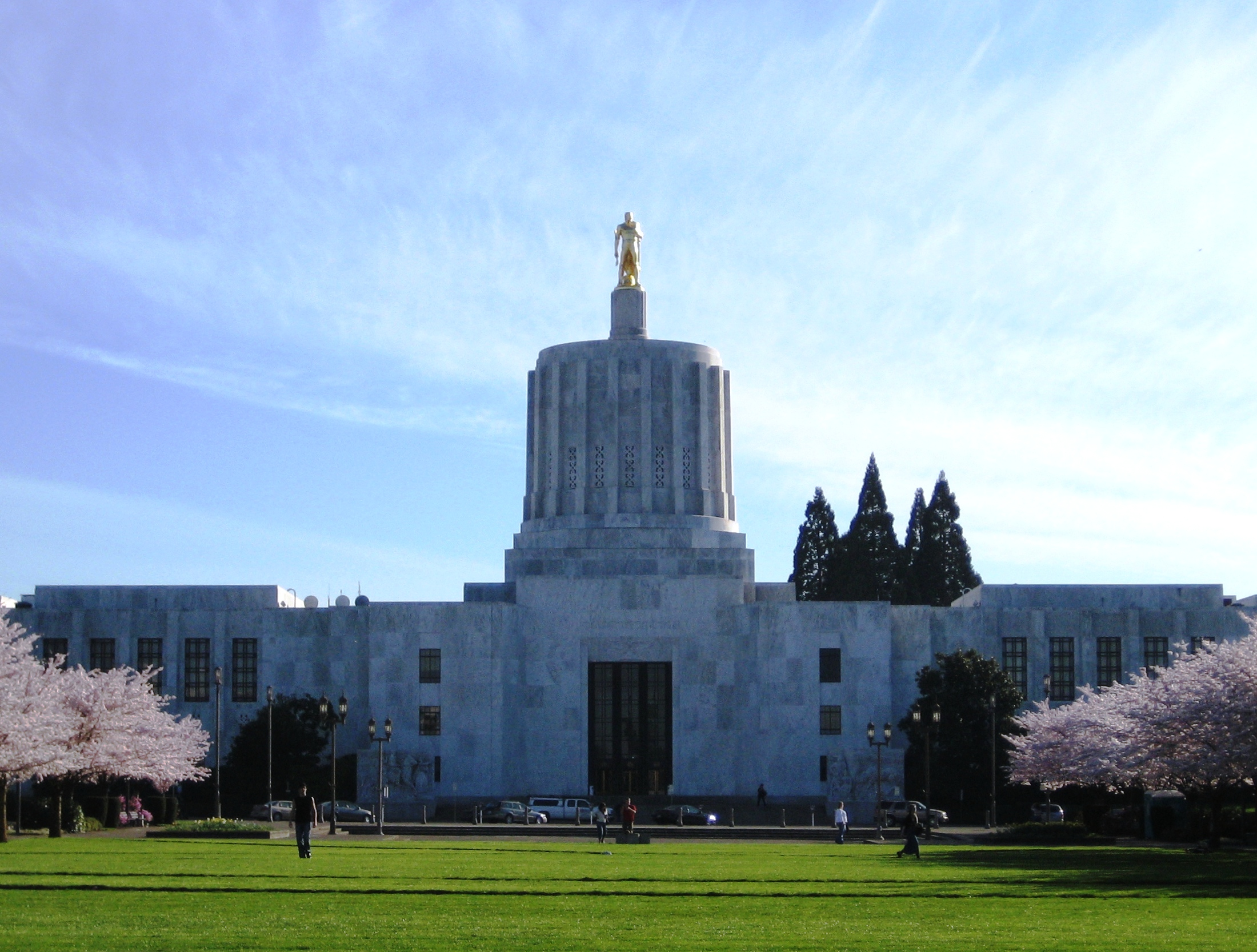
- Oregon State Capitol, view from Capitol Mall

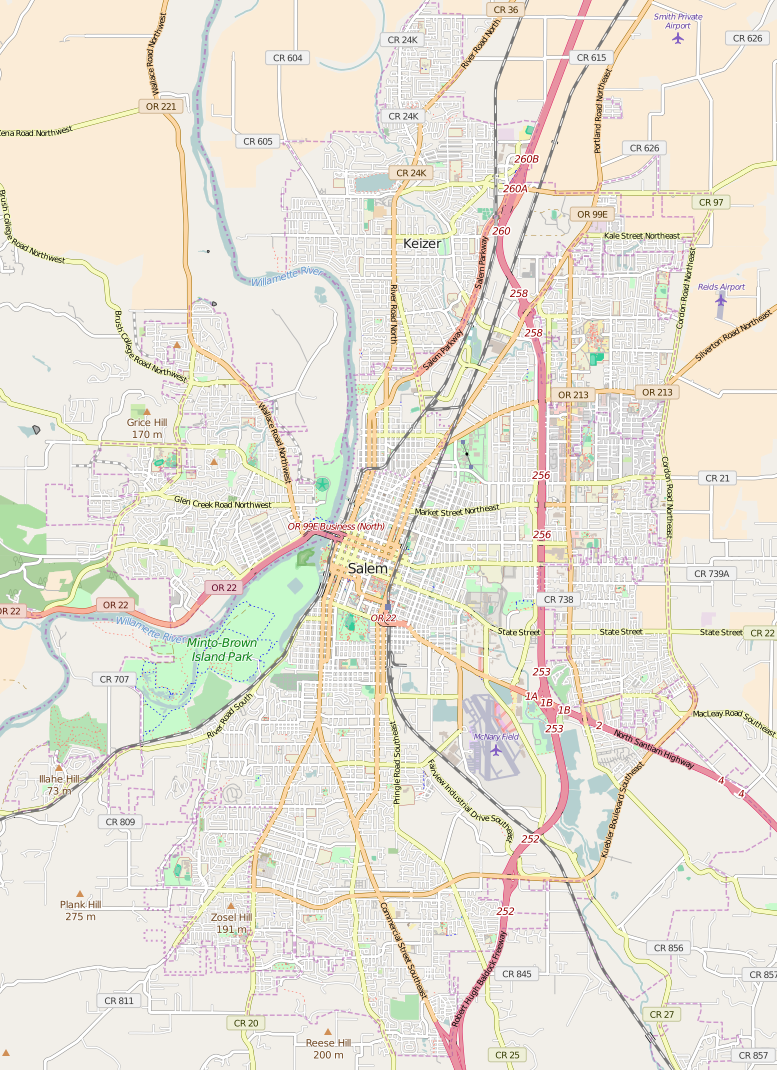
- Location within Salem OR Location within Oregon
- Location: 900 Court Street NE, Salem, Oregon, U.S.
- Coordinates: 44°56′18″N 123°01′50″W
- Built: October 1, 1938; 88 years ago
- Architect: Trowbridge & Livingston
- Architectural style: Art Deco, Stripped Classicism
- NRHP reference No.: 88001055
- Added to NRHP: June 29, 1988

The Oregon State Capitol is the building that houses the state legislature and the offices of the governor, secretary of state, and treasurer of the U.S. state of Oregon. Built from 1936 to 1938 and expanded in 1977, it is the third building to house the Oregon state government in Salem, the state capital. Fires destroyed earlier capitols in 1855 and 1935.

Its Art Deco stripped classical design and its largely marble interior and exterior were conceived by New York architects Trowbridge & Livingston with Francis Keally. The central portion of the building, including a cupola of 166 feet (51 m), was erected at a cost of $2.5 million—partially financed by the federal government's Depression-era Public Works Administration.

The wings, which doubled the floor space of the building to about 233,750 square feet (21,716 m^{2}), were added later for $12.5 million. The grounds outside the capitol building contain artwork, fountains, and flora, including the state tree (Douglas fir) and state flower (Oregon grape). The building was placed on the National Register of Historic Places on June 29, 1988.

== History ==
The first capital of the region was Oregon City, designated by Oregon Country provisional government through legislation on June 27, 1844, and December 19, 1845. J. Quinn Thornton described an early capitol building as 20 by 40 feet with a platform at one end for the president.

Two years after the creation of the Oregon Territory in 1848, Governor Joseph Lane affirmed Oregon City's status as capital by proclamation, and John L. Morrison built one of the private buildings used by the territorial government.

In 1850, the legislature passed an act designating Salem the capital. Governor John P. Gaines refused to move because the act put the university in Corvallis and the penitentiary in Portland, and he declared the act unconstitutional because the governor had the authority to locate those institutions. The Territorial Supreme Court concurred, but while the governor and most of the Supreme Court remained in Oregon City, Justice Orville C. Pratt, who had dissented, moved to Salem. On May 14, 1852, an act of the United States Congress settled the matter in Salem's favor.

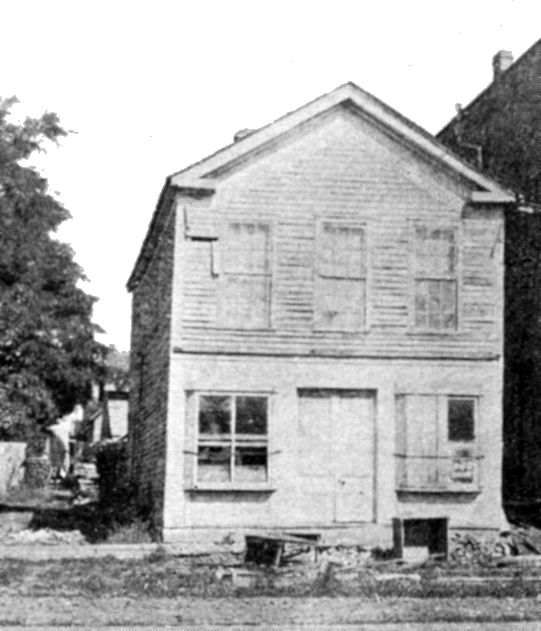
The building used as the capitol in 1855, when the territorial capital was briefly located in Corvallis

But on January 13, 1855, the Oregon Territorial Legislature passed a bill moving the seat of government to yet another town: Corvallis. Governor George Law Curry and others objected because public buildings in Salem were already under construction. Curry sent the matter to U.S. Treasury Secretary James Guthrie, who declared the move invalid unless acted on by Congress. Curry and Oregon Secretary of State Benjamin Harding moved back to Salem.

On December 3, 1855, the legislature convened in Corvallis and 12 days later passed legislation to move the capital back to Salem. On December 18, the legislature re-convened in Salem. But after the statehouse burned down on December 29, the legislature re-opened debate about where to seat the capital. They decided to ask the people of the territory to vote on the question. In June 1856, a vote set up a runoff—initially between Eugene and Corvallis, but after some ballots were invalidated because they were not cast in accordance with the law, between Eugene and Salem. In the October runoff, Eugene received more votes, but the earlier vote-tossing led to turnout so low that the election results were ignored, and the capital remained in Salem.

New referendums were held in 1860 and 1862, but no city received the 50 percent minimum required by law. Finally, Salem received 79 percent the vote in an 1864 election and was declared the state capital. Article XIV of the Oregon Constitution lists the seat of state government as Marion County, of which Salem is the seat.

=== First capitol (1855) ===
Artist's rendering of the 1855 building

Construction of the first capitol building began in 1854, two years after Congress confirmed Salem as the capital city. The land was designated block 84, purchased by the territorial government for this purpose from pioneer and Salem founder W. H. Willson. Construction was temporarily halted after the legislation to move the capital to Corvallis was passed in January 1855, but resumed later in the year as the legislature returned to Salem.

The capitol was designed by Captain Charles Bennett, who participated in the discovery of gold at Sutter's Mill in 1848, and construction supervised by William H. Richter at a total cost of $25,000.

The Greek Revival building stood 50 feet (15 m) wide and 75 feet (23 m) long (15 by 23 m), with a stone facade and a 10-foot (3 m) portico. Built of native ashlar blocks, the two-story exterior walls ranged in color from a deep sky blue to white. The first floor was 19 feet (5.8 m) tall; the second, 15 feet (4.6 m) tall with an eight-foot (2.4 m) entablature. The building was decorated with four Ionic columns on the front (west) end. The building's rooms included a federal courthouse with a chamber measuring 20 by 27 feet (6 by 8 m) and an executive office of 18 by 20 ft (5.5 by 6 m) on the first floor. Also on the first floor was the House chamber, 36 by 46 feet (11 by 14 m) with three entrances. The first floor also held the main hall, which included an entrance 15 feet (5 m) wide. On the second floor was the Senate chamber, 26 by 36 feet (8 by 11 m). The Territorial Library was housed in a room that was 20 by 36 feet (6 by 11 m). The second story had a gallery viewing area for the House, three committee rooms, and several rooms for government clerks.

==== Fire ====
On the evening of December 29, 1855, a fire destroyed the first capitol building and many of the territory's public records. The fire, which started in the unfinished and unoccupied northeast corner of the structure, was not discovered until around 12:30 am. Arson was suspected, but no one was arrested.

The burned-out capitol building remained a pile of stones for several years. A downtown building, Nesmith's Building (later named the Holman Building), served as a temporary capitol from 1859 until 1876. The legislature met on the second and third floors of that building, which also housed the other state offices.

=== Second capitol (1876–1935) ===
Second Oregon capitol, 1876–1935

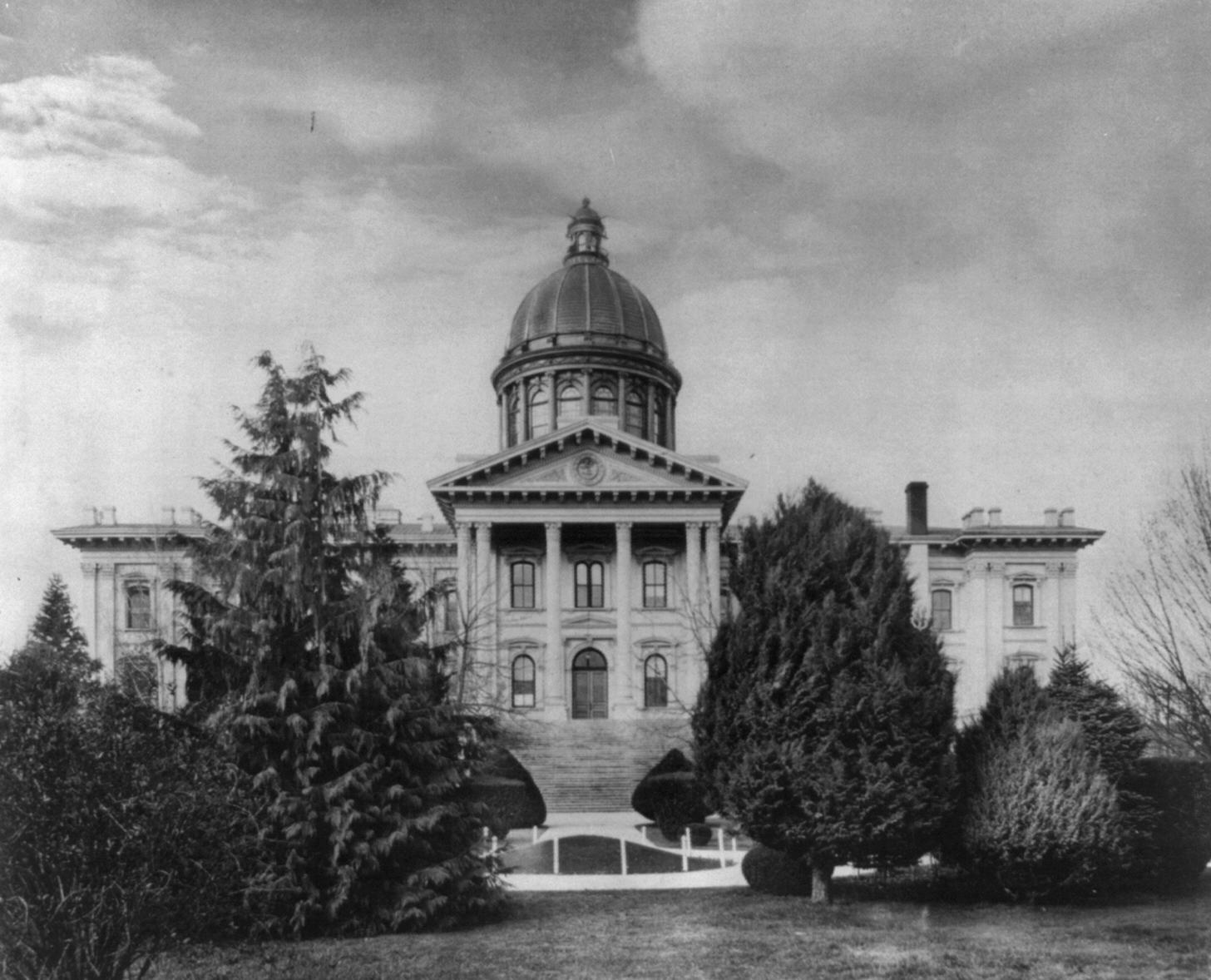
Capitol in 1909

Damage to the capitol from 1935 fire

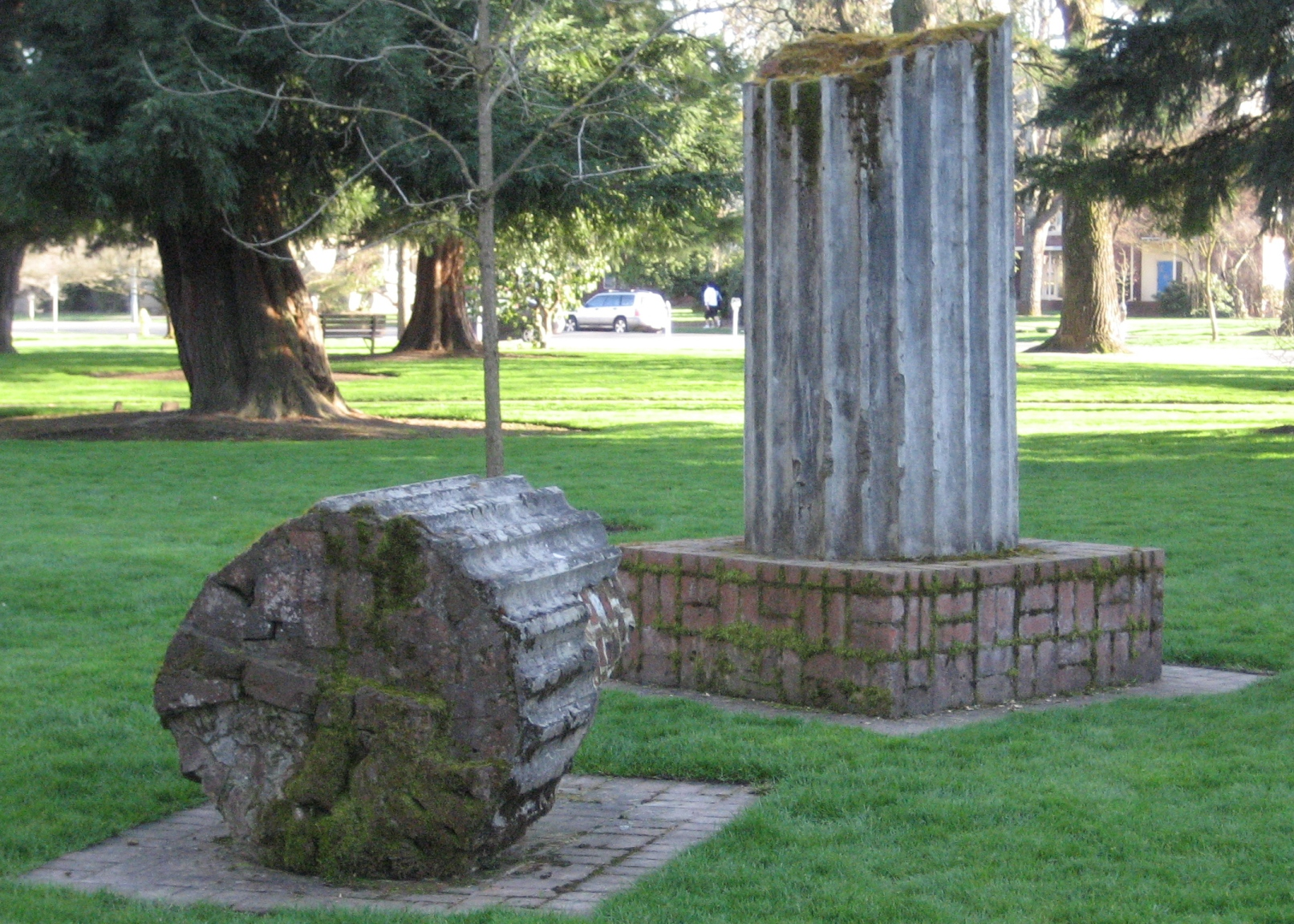
Surviving pillars of the second capitol in 2007

Plans for a new capitol on the site began to take shape in 1872 when the state legislature appropriated $100,000 ($ 2.7 million as of 2025) for it. The design, by architects Justus F. Krumbein and W.G. Gilbert, was a two-story structure with an additional first level that was partly underground. The cornerstone for the building was laid on October 5, 1873, during a ceremony that included a speech by Governor Stephen F. Chadwick and the music of several bands. Built of stone and five million bricks, the building was completed in 1876, partly by convicts from the Oregon State Penitentiary. The total cost was $325,000 ($ 9.8 million as of 2025).

Oregon's new capitol measured 275 by 136 feet (84 by 41 m) with a dome of 180 feet (55 m). The Umpqua region provided the sandstone used in the ground-level base. The structure had a square rotunda on the interior that was 54 feet (16 m) tall. Also inside was a Senate chamber measuring 75 by 45 feet (23 by 14 m) and a House chamber of 85 by 75 feet (26 by 23 m). On the top floor was the Oregon Supreme Court with a courtroom measuring 54 by 45 feet (16 by 14 m) and the Oregon State Law Library, 75 by 70 feet (23 by 21 m). Also on the top floor was a viewing gallery for the House. On the exterior were ornamental pilasters and two-story porticos on the east and west ends. The building included a lunch counter. The building had mullion-windowed wings. The large copper-clad dome was constructed with an iron and steel framework. This dome rose 54 feet (16 m) above the rest of the building and was 100 feet (30 m) tall. The building was of Renaissance style with Corinthian columns on the front entrance and was patterned after the United States Capitol. At that time, the capitol faced west toward the Willamette River. The government began using the building in August 1876, before the dome was built. Originally, plans called for towers on both sides of the dome (a tower on both ends of the building with the dome in the middle), but they were left out to save money. Oregon's second capitol building stood from 1876 to 1935.

==== 1935 Fire ====
On April 25, 1935, at 6:43 pm, a custodial engineer called the Salem Fire Department to report smoke. Citizens helped to remove items from the smoky building, but when firefighters arrived, they ordered everyone to leave the structure, which was soon engulfed in flame. Among the helping citizens was twelve-year-old Mark Hatfield, who later became governor of Oregon. Originating in the east wing's basement, the fire spread to documents stored there. It was spread by an updraft to the upper stories through the hollow columns around the dome's supporting girders. The heat was so intense it destroyed even the copper dome and brightly lit the night sky.

The flames could be seen as far away as Corvallis, 40 miles to the southwest. One volunteer firefighter, Floyd McMullen, a student at Willamette University, was killed by the fire, which drew firefighters from as far away as Portland. Salem sent seven fire trucks to the scene; three more came from Portland. Only the outer walls were left standing after the fire was extinguished. Losses were estimated at $1.5 million ($ 35.2 million as of 2025), and the state did not carry insurance. The losses, which included historic artifacts such as the portraits of the previous governors, could have been worse had the state not used fire-proof vaults in the basement to store valuables such as more than $1 million ($ 23.5 million as of 2025) in stocks and bonds. During the blaze, firefighters poured water on these vaults to help keep them cool and prevent the contents from disintegrating. Years earlier, the state had turned over many historical documents to the Oregon Historical Society in Portland for preservation, and those records were preserved. Although the Supreme Court had moved to the Oregon Supreme Court Building in 1914, the two buildings were connected by tunnels used for electricity and heating. At the time of the fire, the Oregon State Library was in the basement and first floor of the Supreme Court Building. Many books and documents in the basement suffered water damage when water used to fight the fire flooded tunnels and seeped into the Supreme Court Building. Offices previously housed in the Capitol were moved temporarily to other government buildings and to leased space in downtown Salem until a new building was built.

=== Third capitol (1938–present) ===
==== Construction ====
Current Oregon capitol

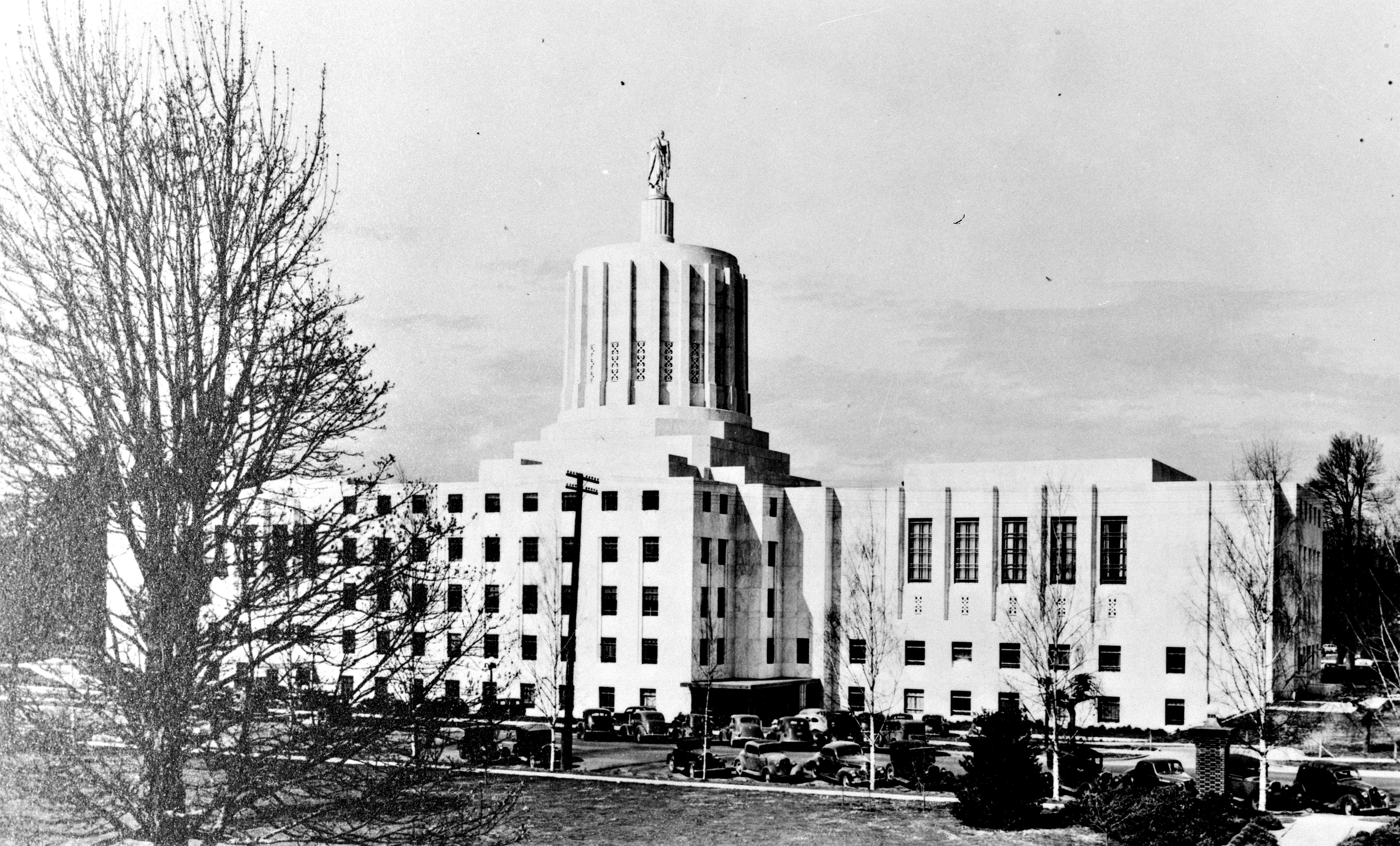
Back of capitol in 1939

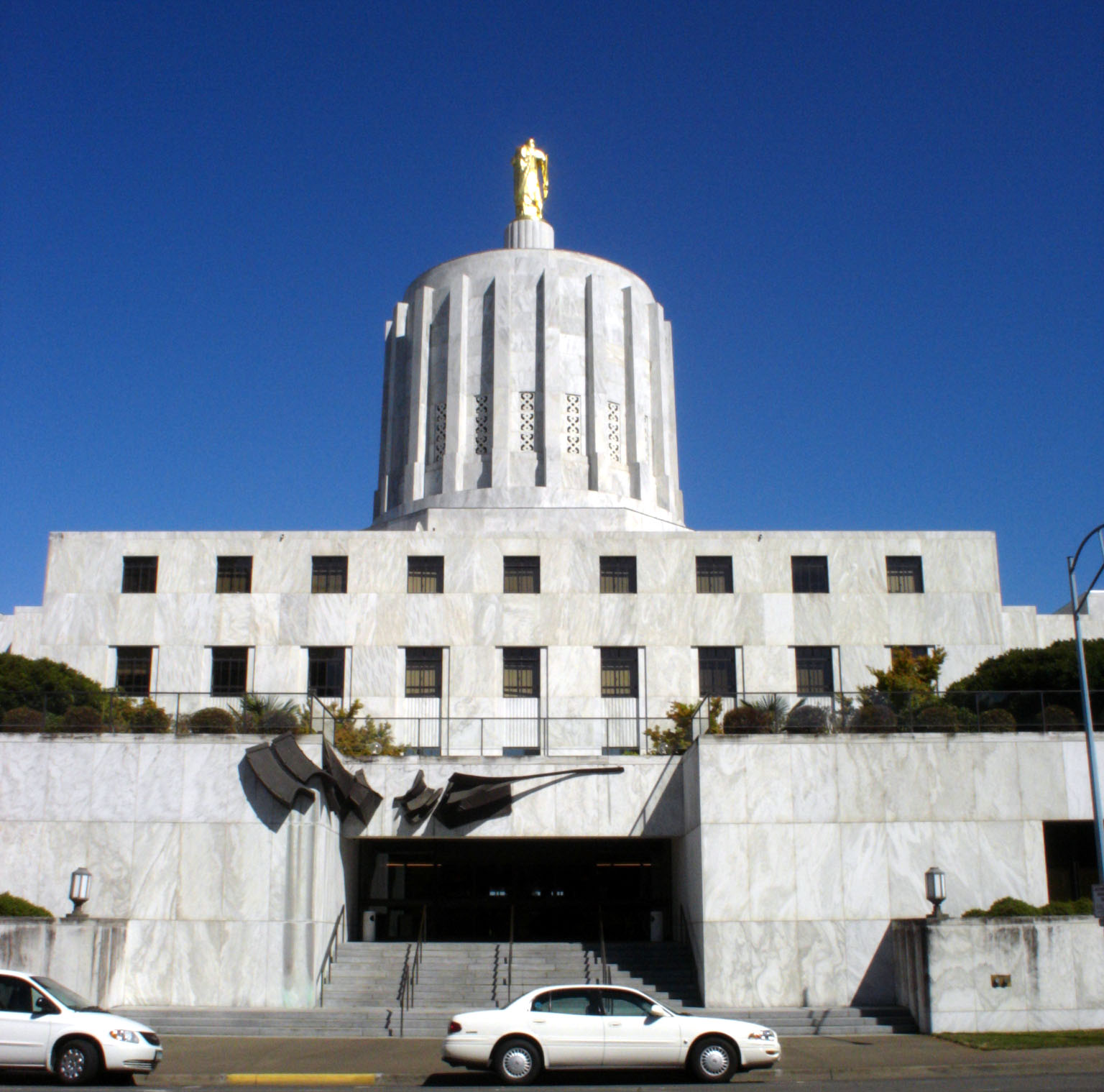
Back of capitol in 2006

Construction of the newest building began on December 4, 1936. The third state capitol was completed June 18, 1938 and is the fourth-newest capitol in the United States. The capitol was dedicated on October 1, 1938, with speeches from President Franklin D. Roosevelt, historian Leslie M. Scott, publisher Robert W. Sawyer, and Oregon Governor Charles Henry Martin. Chosen from 123 entries in a countrywide competition, the design of the new building deviated from the normal design of state capitol buildings. The design was labeled a combination of Egyptian simplicity and Greek refinement. Overall it is Art Deco in style, and is one of only three state capitols in the United States constructed in that architectural style.

Controversy occurred before construction began when Governor Martin suggested the new building be sited on a hill south of downtown (Candalaria Heights) and away from the busy center of town. Another proposal called for the purchase of the Willamette University campus and relocation of the capitol to that site. However, downtown merchants were able to keep the capitol building in downtown at the original location, though some Victorian homes were subsequently leveled to make way for the building. Another early complaint about the structure was that the cupola resembled a "paint can" rather than traditional domes on other capitols, including the earlier Oregon structures. It was even called a "squirrel cage", lacking in majesty. Additionally, the public was slow to admire the gold Oregon Pioneer atop the cupola. Installation of the statue began on September 17, 1938, and took several days and heavy-duty equipment.

The building cost $2.5 million ($ 58 million as of 2025), of which the federal government paid 45 percent through the Public Works Administration. Upon completion, the new capitol was 164 feet (50 m) wide, 400 feet (120 m) long, and 166 feet (51 m) tall (50 by 122 by 51 m) and contained 131,750 square feet (12,240 m^{2}) of usable space. The exterior was finished with Vermont marble. The lobby, rotunda, and halls were lined with a polished rose travertine stone quarried in Montana. The rotunda's staircases and floor used Phenix Napoleon Grey Marble quarried in Phenix, Missouri, and had borders of Radio Black marble that, like the exterior stone, is from Vermont. There are 158 names of notable Oregonians inscribed on the walls of the legislative chambers; of these, only six are women. The original cost estimate for the building was $3.5 million ($ 81 million as of 2025), but the state legislature only appropriated $2.5 million; committee rooms were subsequently removed from the plans. These rooms were added in 1977 as part of a $12.5 million ($ 66 million as of 2025) expansion project to add new wings containing legislative offices, hearing rooms, support services, a first-floor galleria, and underground parking. This addition doubled the space of the capitol building. In 2002, the wings were remodeled at a cost of $1.3 million ($ 2.3 million as of 2025) to upgrade items such as antiquated wiring and to install new carpeting and lighting.

==== Maintenance, repairs and events ====
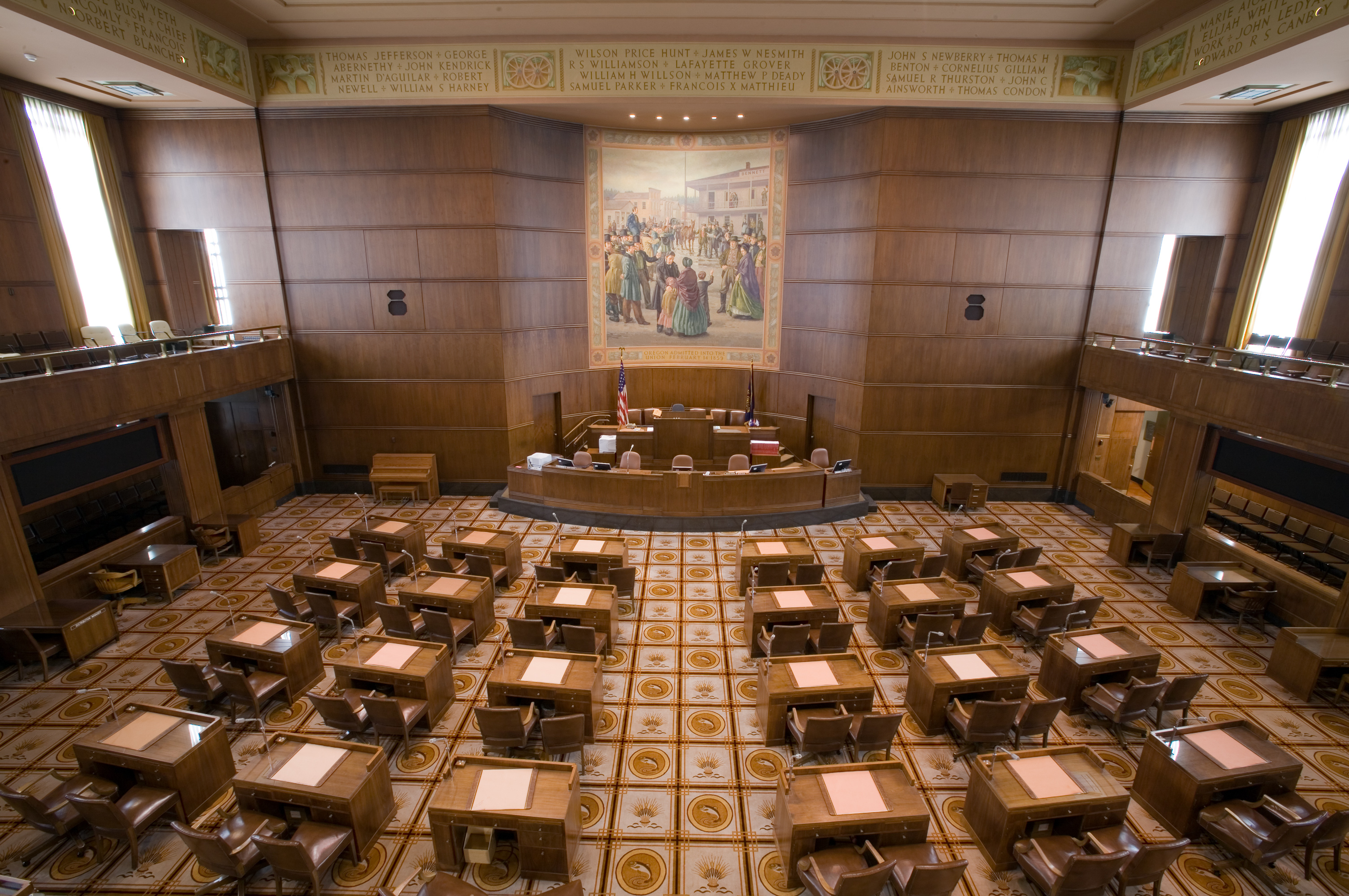
State Senate chamber

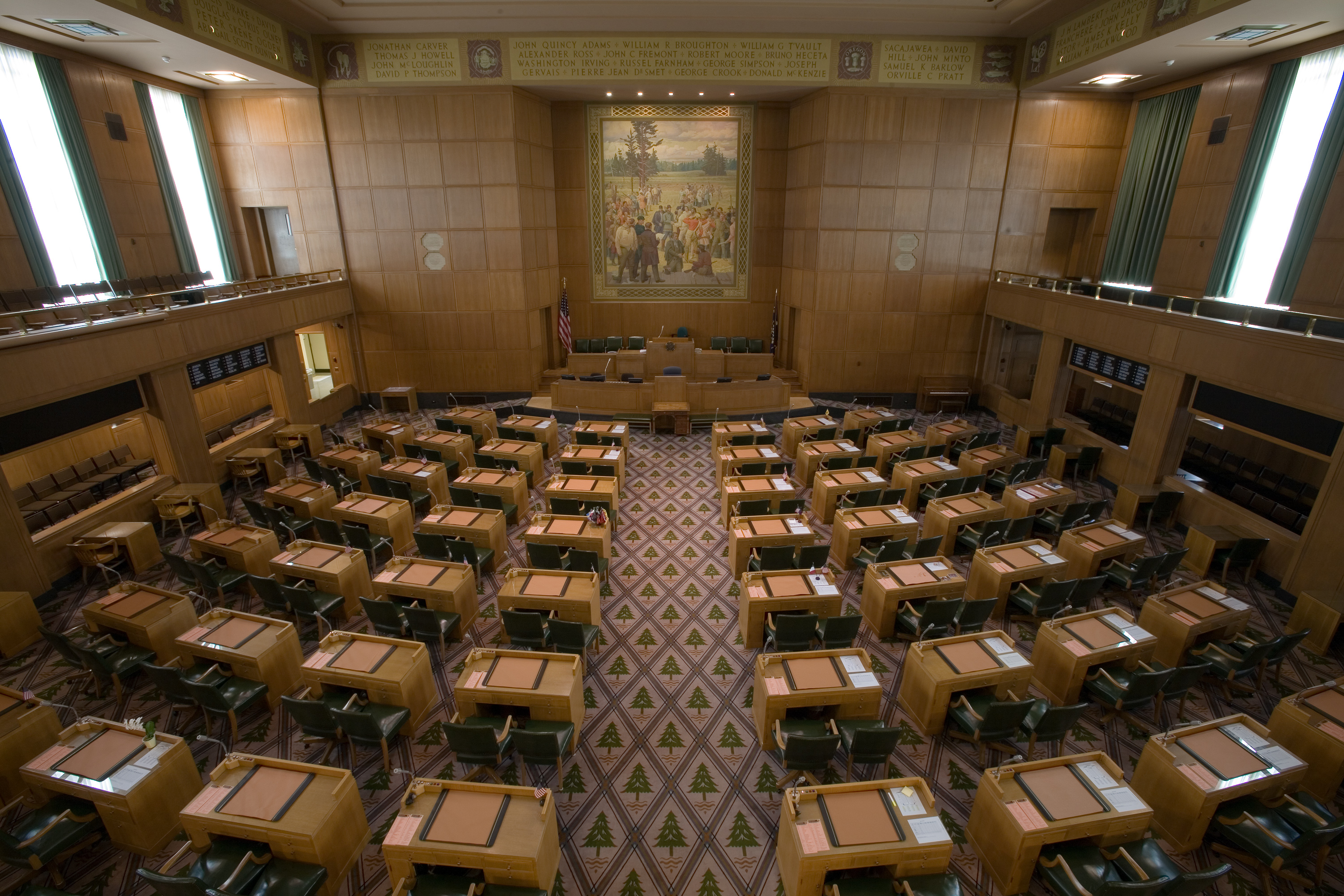
House of Representatives chamber

On March 25, 1993, the magnitude 5.6 Scotts Mills earthquake damaged the cupola, requiring closure for repairs. The rotunda area remained closed for approximately two years for these repairs. This "Spring Break Quake" shook the building enough to shift the statue on top and crack the cupola. Additionally, the quake created a three-foot (one-meter) bulge on the west end of the building. Repairs cost $4.3 million ($9.6 million as of 2025) and included reinforcing the structure with additional concrete and steel bars.

In April 2002, the building became the first state capitol in the United States to produce solar power through the use of 60 photovoltaic panels generating 7.8 kilowatts. One-third of the power is used to light the Oregon Pioneer at night; the remaining electricity is sent into the power grid.

On December 31, 2007, the Oregon State Capitol hosted its first authorized wedding between Oregon State Representative Tobias Read and Heidi Eggert. At Read's encouragement, the Legislature created a policy authorizing up to four public events a year. On August 30, 2008, the building caught fire around 12:30 in the morning, and it was quickly extinguished with damage to the Governor's offices on the second floor on the south side. The governor was forced to relocate some of his offices, including some time at the Oregon State Library across the street.

During a special session in December 2020, armed protesters demonstrated at the capitol against health restrictions related to the COVID-19 pandemic in Oregon. In January 2021, a security video was released showing Representative Mike Nearman allowing protesters to enter the Capitol Building. As a result of his action, Nearman pleaded guilty to one count of official misconduct in the first degree and the Oregon House of Representatives voted 59–1 to expel him on the grounds of "disorderly behavior."

The Capitol Accessibility, Maintenance and Safety project was approved by the legislative assembly in 2016 at a cost of $59.9 million. This project was designed to address Americans with Disabilities Act deficiencies; at-risk mechanical, electrical and plumbing systems; and security and life-safety issues in the Oregon State Capitol building. A second phase of this project was approved at a cost of $70.8 million by the legislative assembly in 2020 to address seismic upgrades, historic restoration, and additional ADA accessibility issues at the building's south entrance. A final phase, approved in 2022 at a cost of $465 million, focuses on upgrades to the oldest parts of the building, including seismic upgrades, adding four hearing rooms, adding a café, lead pipe and asbestos removal, and upgrading facilities for journalists and lobbyists. The total cost of the project is nearly $600 million and includes inserting 160 base isolators in the 160-million-pound building's foundation to avoid damage during seismic activity in the Cascadia subduction zone, with the new system being rated to limit damages even while the earth moves up to 2 feet in any direction.

The project has been criticized for cost overruns and for quiet approval of $90 million of additional funding; the project's budget is now nearly double the anticipated $375 million initially estimated. The building has continued to be used for legislative purposes during construction at a cost of $20 million, although parts of the building continue to be closed off. The renovation should be complete by 2026, with the full building opening to the public by April 2025.

== Exterior and interior ==
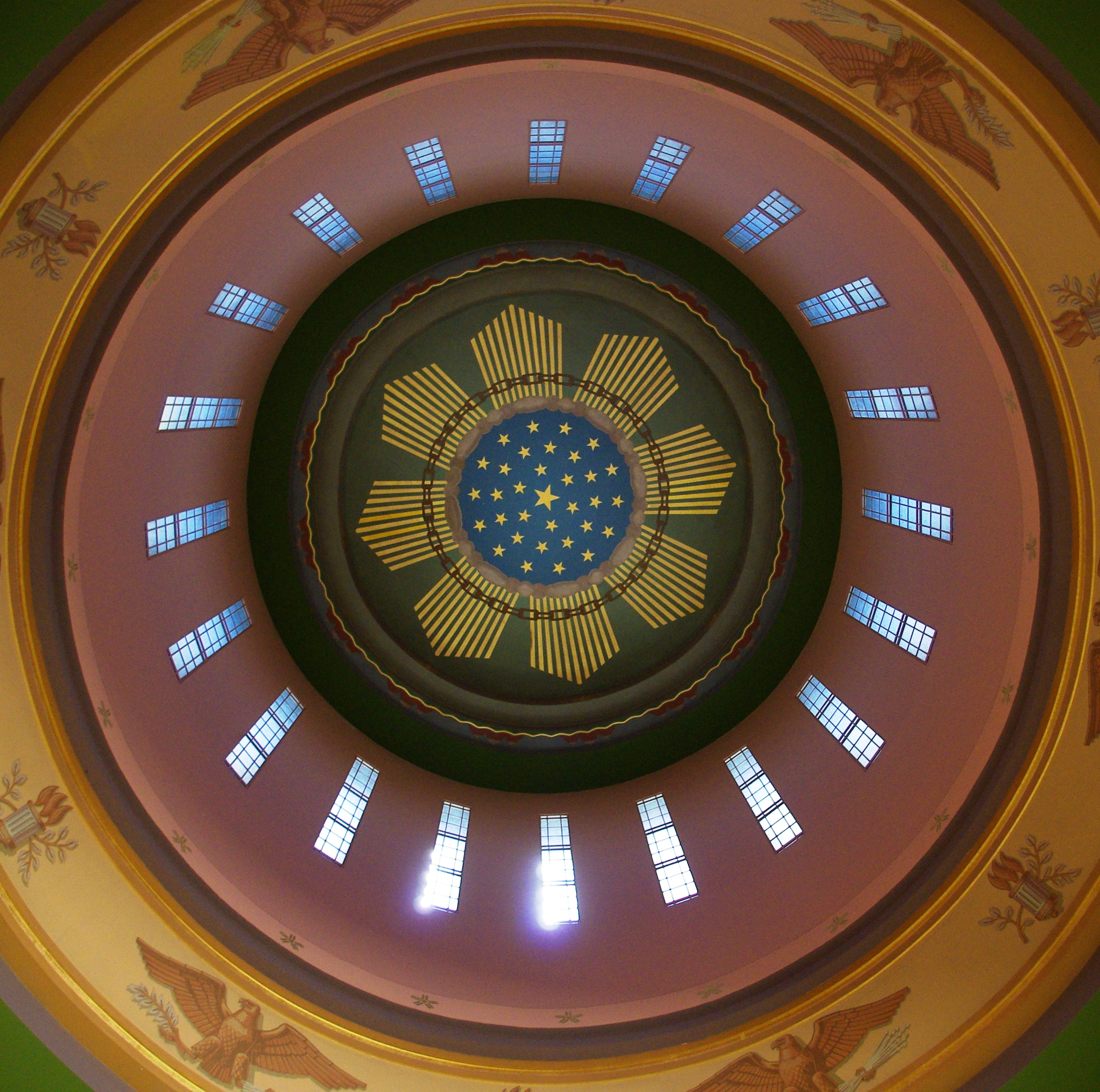
Interior ceiling of the cupola above the rotunda

The Oregon State Capitol is home to both branches of the state legislature, the House and Senate, and has offices for the governor, treasurer, and secretary of state. In its center, the floor of the prominent rotunda features an embedded Oregon State Seal sculpted in bronze by Ulric Ellerhusen. Ellerhusen also sculpted the Oregon Pioneer that rests atop the capitol dome's exterior. The dome rises 106 feet (32 m) above the state seal. The interior of the dome was painted by Frank H. Schwarz and features 33 stars, symbolizing Oregon's place as the 33rd state to join the Union. Eight medallions are painted near the top of the walls of the rotunda to represent the eight objects in the state seal. An inscription on the rotunda south wall, facing the entrance from the north, reads:

In the souls of its citizens will be found the likeness of the state which if they be unjust and tyrannical then will it reflect their vices, but if they be lovers of righteousness confident in their liberties so will it be clean in justice bold in freedom.

Also encircling the interior of the rotunda are four murals depicting moments from Oregon history. One mural depicts Captain Robert Gray's exploration of the Columbia River in 1792, another shows the Lewis and Clark Expedition, and two others portray covered wagons from pioneer times. These four murals were painted by Schwarz and Barry Faulkner. Other murals include the Provisional Government of Oregon's salmon and wheat seal, the Oregon Territory's seal, and depictions of Oregon's industries, all located in the rotunda's wings along the grand staircase. The capitol's galleria area on the first floor includes hearing rooms, display cases, and the visitor information area.

Oregon's House chamber floor is covered with a custom carpet; the carpet's pattern incorporates a depiction of the state tree, the Douglas-fir, representative of forestry. The furniture and paneling of the chamber is made of golden oak. A large mural painted by Faulkner, depicting the 1843 Champoeg Meetings at which the provisional government was formed, is behind the desk of the Speaker of the House. The Senate chambers use black walnut for the paneling and furniture. Another custom carpet lines the floor, featuring Chinook salmon and wheat, representative of fishing and agriculture. The Senate's large mural was painted by Schwarz and depicts a street scene showing news of statehood reaching Salem. Lining the walls of both chambers are 158 names, inscribed in friezes, of prominent people in Oregon's history. On the second floor of the capitol is the Governor's suite, consisting of a ceremonial office and private offices for the state's chief executive. As in the Senate chamber, the paneling is of black walnut. The ceremonial office includes a fireplace with a painting by Faulkner. In the suite's reception area is a table made of 40 tree species. This table is inlaid with a replica of Oregon's second capitol building, the state flower (Oregon-grape), and the state bird (western meadowlark).

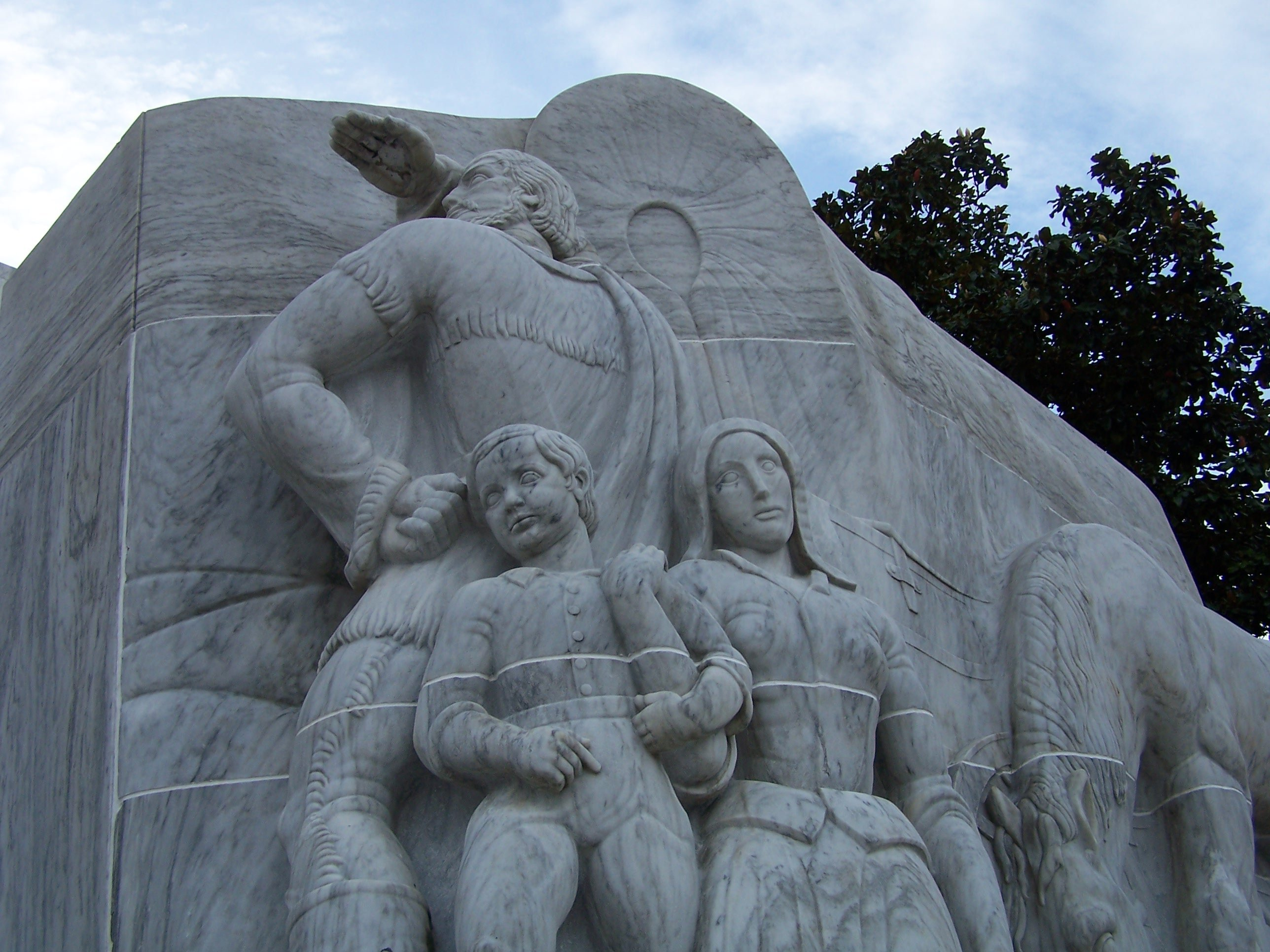
Leo Friedlander's relief sculpture Covered Wagon (1934) outside the main entrance

A variety of artwork is displayed on the exterior of the building. Sculptor Leo Friedlander used Vermont marble for the large relief sculptures on both sides of the main entrance. One sculpture depicts Meriwether Lewis, William Clark, and Sacagawea, with a map of their expedition's route on the reverse (Lewis and Clark); the other (Covered Wagon) shows pioneers and a covered wagon, with a map of the Oregon Trail on the reverse. Additionally, Ellerhusen created five marble relief sculptures on the exterior, and a metal sculpture by Tom Morandi sits above the south entrance. Ellerhusen also cast six bronze sculptures arranged above the building's main entrance, three on the inside and three on the outside.

The building measures 693 by 259.5 ft (211.2 by 79.1 m). The older main portion of the building is 53.5 feet (16.3 m) tall, while the newer wings added in 1977 are 68.7 feet (20.9 m) tall. Inside, the building has approximately 233,750 square feet (21,716 m^{2}) of floor area and 3.2 million cubic feet (90,600 cubic meters) of volume.

In 1997, the Legislative Assembly established the non-profit Oregon State Capitol Foundation in order to "create a living history, enhance the dignity and beauty of the Capitol, and foster cultural and educational opportunities." In 2005, the foundation completed the Walk of the Flags project, a display in Willson Park on the capitol grounds of all 50 flags of the U.S. states.

In 2007, the capitol wings closed for a restoration project to upgrade items such as furniture, plumbing, and electrical systems. The $34 million project became an issue in the 2008 Senate campaign between Gordon Smith and Jeff Merkley when Smith used the price of the project in ads attacking Merkley, who was the Speaker of the Oregon House when the remodel was approved. Part of the attack involved the cost of new desks for legislators and staff that were manufactured by Oregon prison inmates. Renovations were completed in November 2008.

== Grounds ==
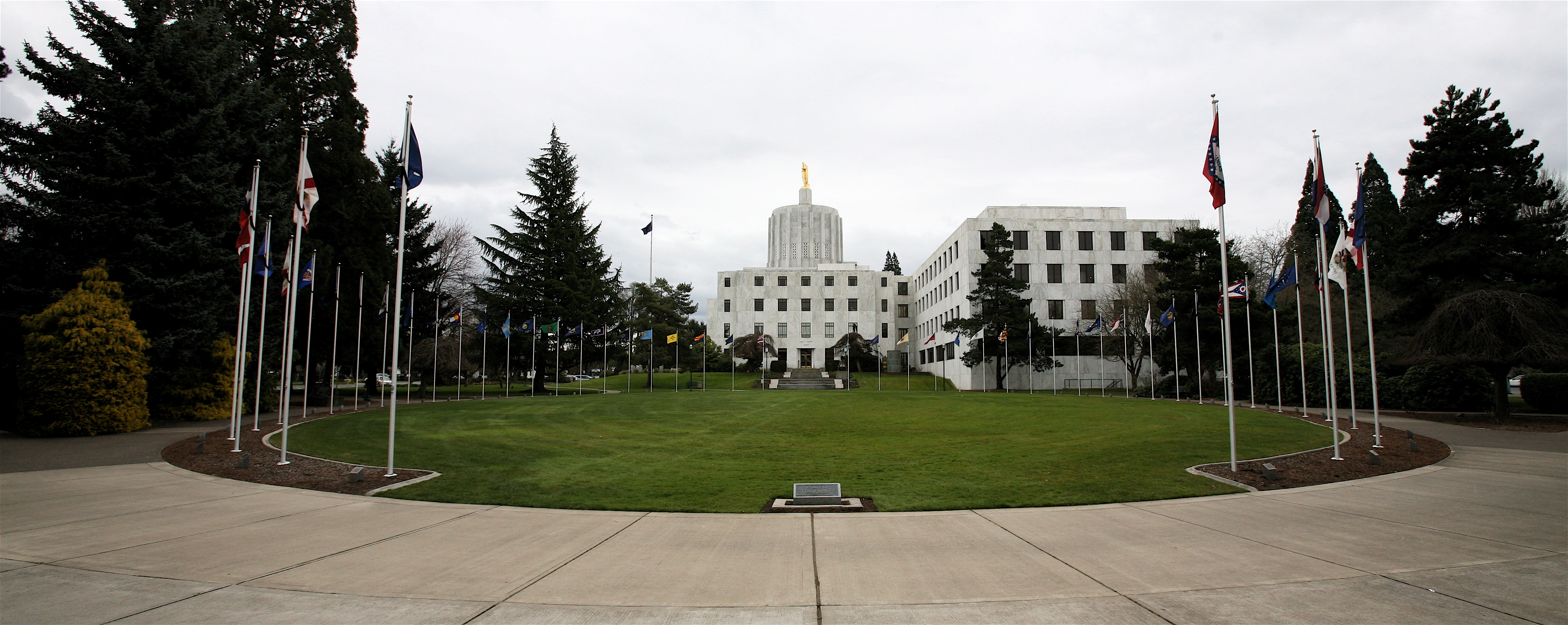
Walk of Flags on the capitol grounds

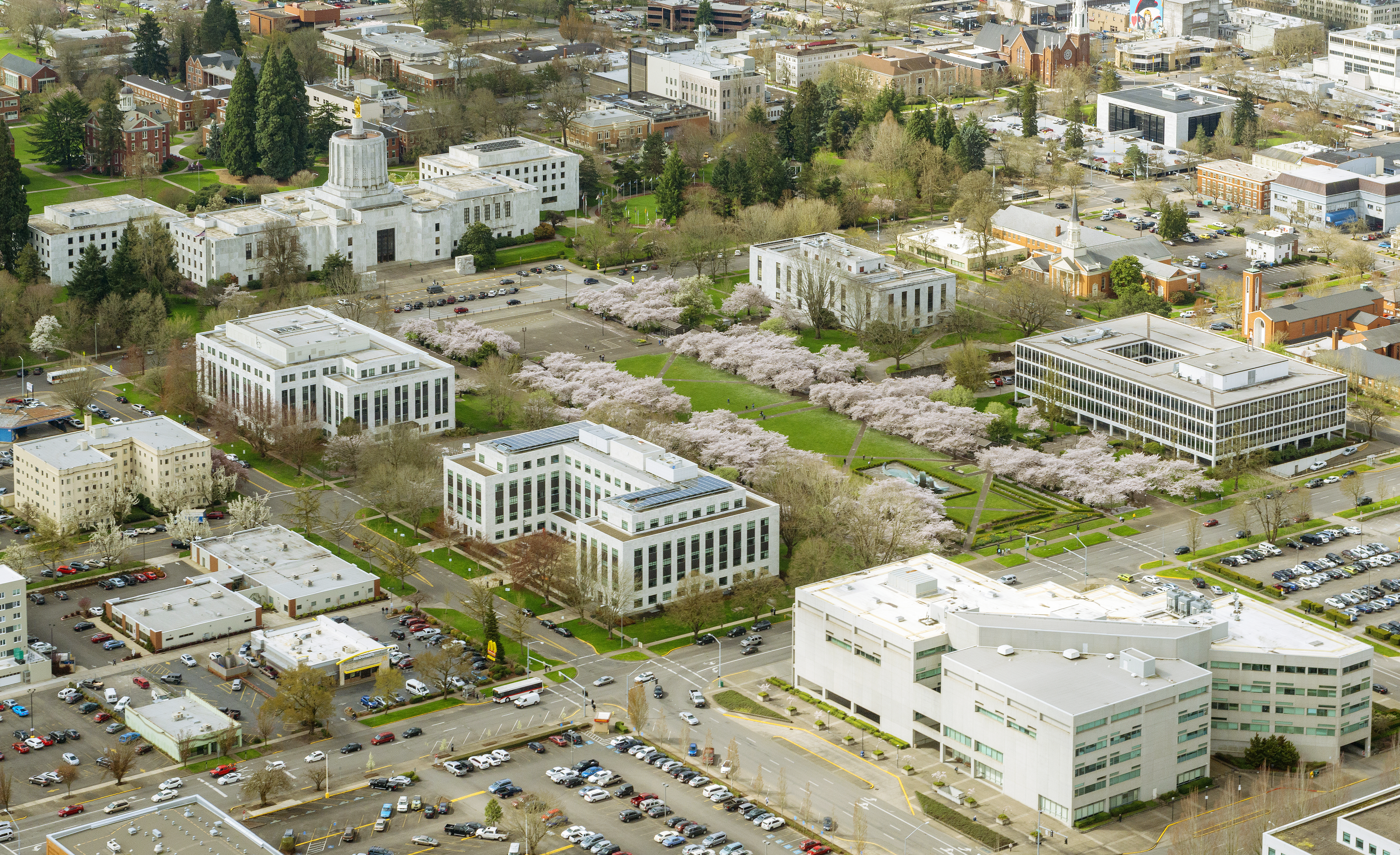
Aerial view of the Capitol and surrounding area

The capitol grounds cover three city blocks and include Capitol and Willson parks. Near the west entrance of the capitol is a replica of Philadelphia's Liberty Bell. This bell is one of 53 full-sized replicas made in France and donated by the United States government to each state. Oregon received its copy on July 4, 1950. Throughout the grounds are native trees and shrubs, including blue spruce, Oregon-grape (the state flower), giant sequoia, coast redwood, Japanese maple, dogwood species, Bradford pear, cherry tree species, English holly, rhododendron, and magnolia tree species. One Douglas-fir tree was grown using a seed that was carried aboard Apollo 14 to the Moon in 1971 and was transplanted to the capitol in 1976 from Oregon State University.

=== East Capitol Park ===
On the east side of the building is Capitol Park, which includes a bronze equestrian statue by A. Phimister Proctor called The Circuit Rider, statues of Jason Lee (Jason Lee) and John McLoughlin (John McLoughlin) by Gifford Proctor, and portions of the Corinthian columns of the second capitol building. Lee established the Methodist Mission and what would become Willamette University. McLoughlin, of the Hudson's Bay Company, was proclaimed the Father of Oregon. The Circuit Rider was added in 1924 as a monument to early preachers. During the Columbus Day Storm in 1962, this statue was knocked over and damaged, but it was restored in 1963. There is also a memorial to Oregon's recipients of the Medal of Honor, dedicated on September 18, 2004.

=== West Willson Park ===
To the west of the building is Willson Park, named for Salem founder William H. Willson and sited roughly at the center of his former landholdings. From 1853 to 1965 it was a Salem city park. After the park was turned over to the state, Lloyd Bond and Associates were asked to redesign the park. Willson Park features the Oregon World War II Memorial, the Waite Fountain, a gazebo built in 1982, and Peter Helzer's sculpture A Parade of Animals (1991), which was designed as a play structure. Waite Fountain was donated in honor of Oregon businessperson E. M. Waite in 1907 by his wife. The Breyman Fountain, added in 1904 as a memorial to Werner and Eugene Breyman, is at the far west end of the park. It was originally decorated with a statue of a soldier from the Spanish–American War and also served as a lamppost and horse trough. Today the statue holds no water and is sometimes planted with flowers. In 2005, a Walk of Flags feature was added that displays the flags of every state in the Union. In 2009, the nine flags of Oregon's federally recognized Native American tribes were added to the Walk of Flags.

Other features on the capitol grounds include Sprague Fountain and the Wall of Water. The Wall of Water is located across Court Street from the main entrance. It was added in 1990 and has 22 nozzles shooting water 12 feet (3.7 m) into the air in a plaza that also has slabs of stone with information about Oregon's history. Added in 1985, the Capitol Beaver Family sculpture represents the state animal. Additional features of the grounds include a peace pole donated by the Society of Prayer for World Peace, a large boulder that once lay along the Oregon Trail, a planter that spells out "Oregon" using shrubs, and a rose garden maintained by the Salem Rose Society.

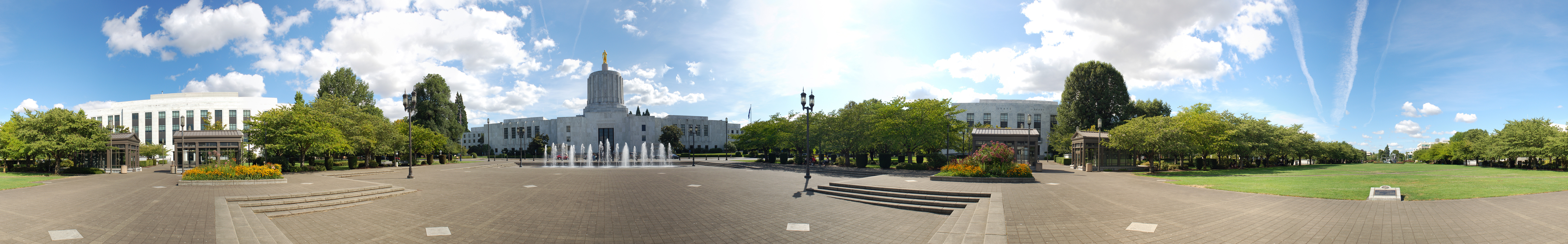
360° panorama showing the Oregon State Capitol and the Capitol Mall

== See also ==
- Government of Oregon
- List of capitals in the United States for information on the other locations of the Oregon capital
- List of Oregon Legislative Assemblies
- List of state and territorial capitols in the United States
