= Wall of Water =

Fountain in Salem, Oregon, U.S.

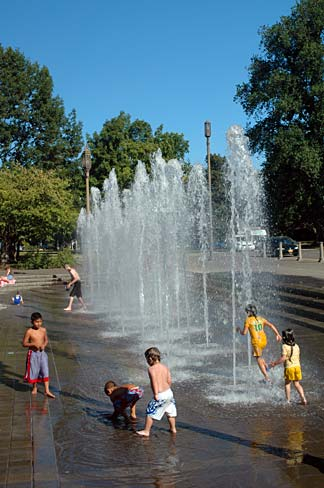
- Children playing in the fountain in 2006

- Location within Oregon
- Coordinates: 44.93921°N 123.030054°W

The Wall of Water is a fountain on the Oregon State Capitol grounds, in Salem, Oregon, United States.

It was installed in 1990 along Court Street across from the building's main entrance, and its plaza features engraved slabs about Oregon's folklore and history. The fountain uses recycled water and can shoot 12 feet into the air.
