= Oregon World War II Memorial =

War memorial Salem, Oregon, U.S.

- United States
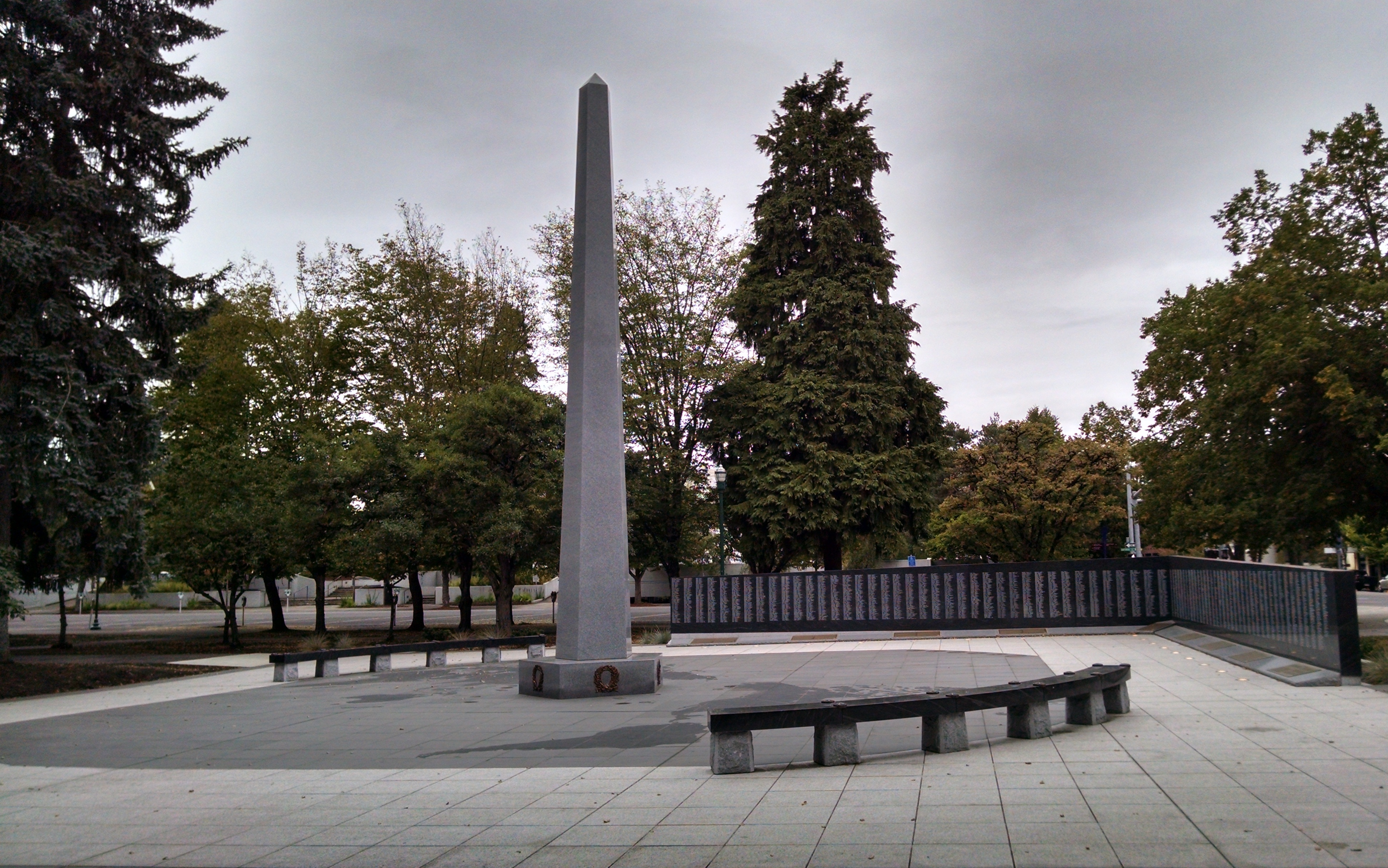
- The memorial in 2015
- For World War II
- Established: June 6, 2014
- Location: 44.939505°N 123.033042°W; Oregon State Capitol, Salem, Oregon, U.S.

The Oregon World War II Memorial to Oregon veterans of World War II, is located the grounds of the Oregon State Capitol, in Salem, Oregon, United States. Nine memorial plaques recount the stories of action of Oregon Army, Marines, Navy, Air Corps, National Guard, and civilians. A memorial wall records the names of those killed in action. A granite pavement featuring an inscribed world map, with stars indicating the theaters of war where Oregon soldiers, sailors, marines and airmen served, surrounding an obelisk which is blank and unadorned.

It was dedicated on June 6, 2014.

== See also ==
- 2014 in art
- Oregon Department of Veterans' Affairs
- Veterans Affairs Medical Center (Oregon)
