= Oregon State Capitol Foundation =

The birth of the Oregon State Capitol Foundation dates back to 1991 with the Capitol Preservation Advisory Committee (CPAC). Committee members saw a need to preserve the Capitol beyond budgeted maintenance.

Initially, formation of a "Friends of the Capitol" group was contemplated and a subcommittee established goals and objectives. They decided to formalize their group and, with the Legislature's support, formed the Oregon State Capitol Foundation. Formerly an agency of the Oregon Legislative Assembly, the Oregon State Capitol Foundation was established by statute in 1997 to preserve the historical integrity of the Oregon State Capitol and its immediate adjacent areas, and to provide recognition for its individuals and events that have historic importance.

== Funding ==
The Oregon State Capitol Foundation operates with funds from a variety of sources:

- Corporate sponsorships.
- Earned income.
- Foundation grants.

Earned income is generated from the sale of Pacific Wonderland license plates; revenue is shared with the Oregon Historical Society. Additional earned income, though limited, is generated at times from the sale of deaccessioned historical items from the Capitol and from ticket sales to special events.

== Governance ==
The Oregon State Capitol Foundation is overseen by an all-volunteer Board of Directors made up of current and former legislators, lobbyists, state workers and community volunteers.

== See also ==
- Oregon State Capitol
- Government of Oregon
- Oregon Pioneer
