= Oregon Department of Veterans' Affairs =

State agency

Coordinates: 44.94436°N 123.02696°W

Agency overview
- Formed: 1945
- Jurisdiction: Government of Oregon
- Agency executive: Dr. Nakeia Council Daniels, Director; Deputy Director
- Website: www.oregon.gov/odva/pages/default.aspx

The Oregon Department of Veterans' Affairs is an agency of the government of the U.S. state of Oregon responsible for programs and benefits for citizens of the state who are veterans of the U.S. armed services, their dependents and survivors.

The agency was created in 1945 by the Oregon Legislative Assembly in response to popular citizen support for provide benefits and services to Oregon soldiers, sailors and airmen returning from World War II. Since then, the scope of the department's responsibilities have been expanded to include a wider range of services to veterans of all eras, and their families.

The Oregon World War II Memorial at the Oregon Capitol grounds in Salem.

Veterans Affairs Medical Center in Southwest Portland, on the grounds of OHSU.

Edward C. Allworth Veterans' Home in Lebanon, Oregon.
