= Alois Lang =

German woodcarver and artist

Alois Lang (1872–1954) was a Master Woodcarver at the American Seating Company, and one of the artists responsible for bringing the medieval art of ecclesiastical carving to life in the United States.

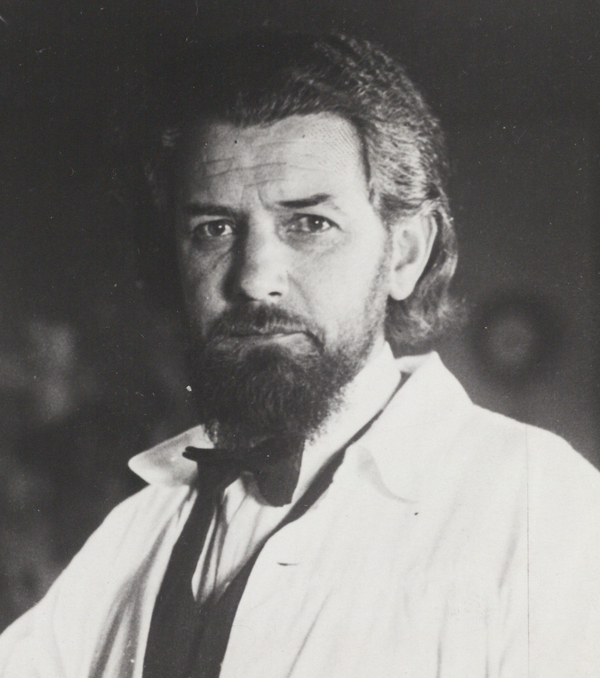
Alois Lang, 1872-1954

Lang was born in Oberammergau in Bavaria, a town known for its excellence in wood carving. He was apprenticed to his cousin Andreas Lang around the age of 14, spent one year's study with the great wood sculptor Fortunato Galli in Florence, Italy, and moved to the United States in 1890 at the age of 19. Lang first found work in Boston carving elaborate mantelpieces for Back Bay families.

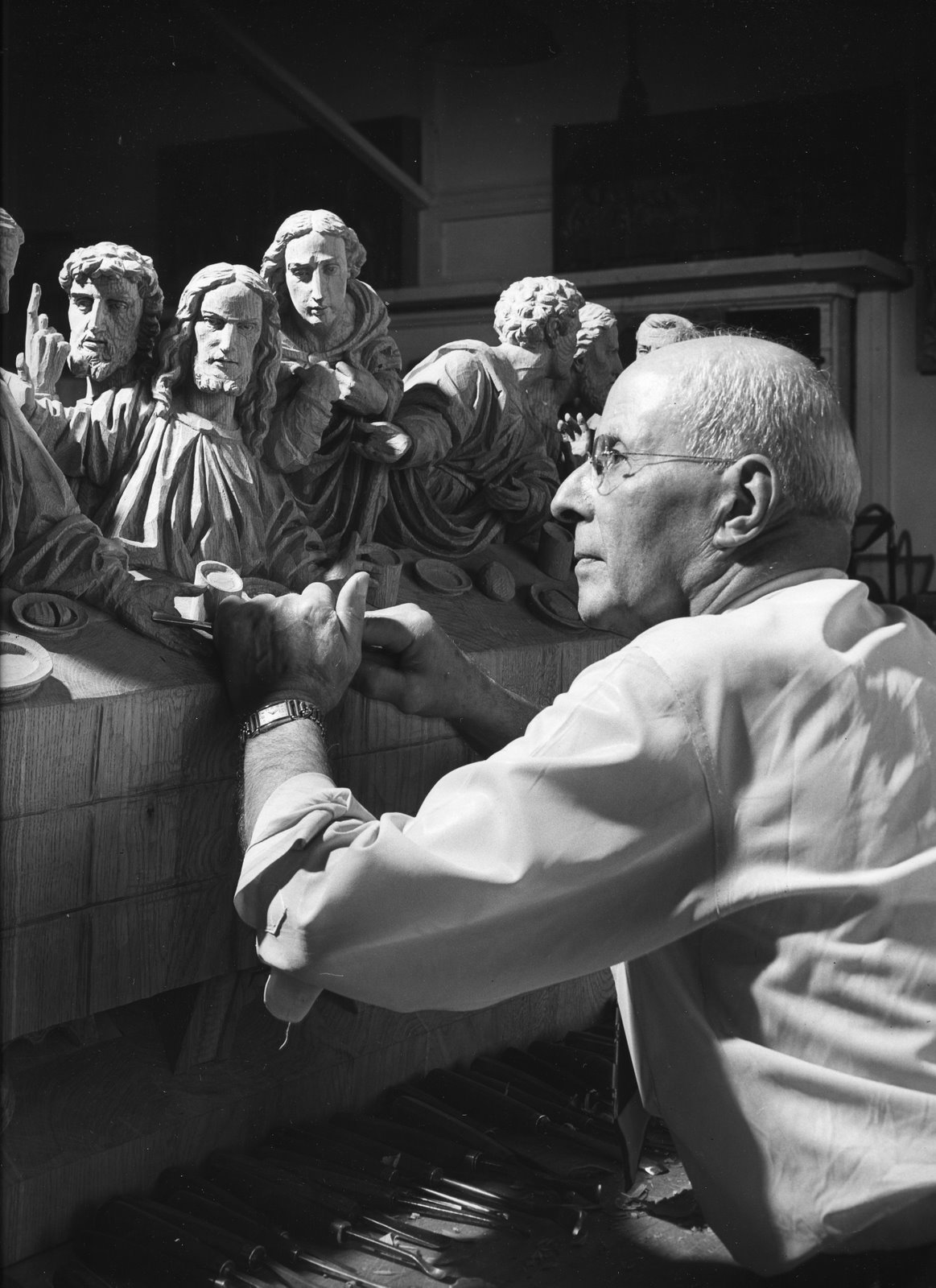
Alois Lang working on "The Last Supper"

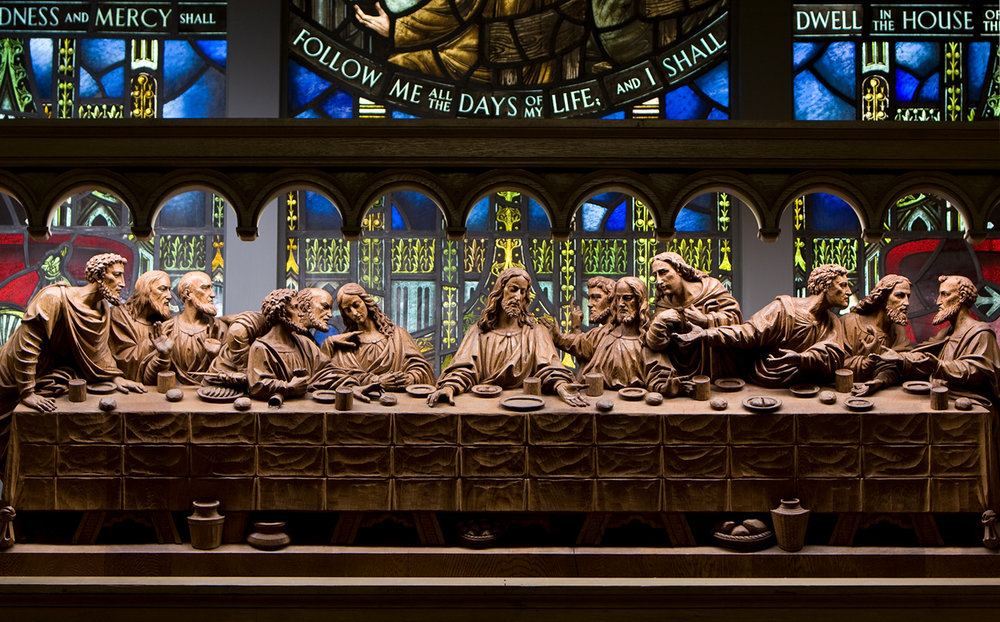
Carving by Alois Lang inspired by the Leonardo da Vinci fresco

In 1903, he moved to westward and joined the American Seating Company of Manitowoc, Wisconsin, moving with the firm to Grand Rapids, Michigan in 1927. Lang became known as an ecclesiastical wood-carver. An article in a 1946 newsletter states that "recently the Michigan Academy of Science, Arts and Letters presented him with a special award for his contribution to art in Michigan".

== Notable works ==
Lang's carvings can be found in numerous buildings, mostly in churches, throughout the United States, including:

- Peachtree Christian Church, Atlanta, Georgia
- First Congregational Church of La Grange, La Grange, Illinois
- Rockefeller Chapel, Chicago, Illinois
- Christ Church Cathedral, Springfield, Massachusetts (reredos, narthex portal and screen)
- Christ Church, Cranbrook, Bloomfield Hills, Michigan
- Covenant Lutheran Church, Stoughton, Wisconsin (hand-carved altar with illustration patterned after Leonardo DaVinci's painting, "The Last Supper", originally installed in Central Lutheran Church, Stoughton, Wisconsin)
- Emmanuel Episcopal Church, La Grange, Illinois (Last Supper, reredos originally installed in Christchurch, Chicago, Illinois)
- National Shrine of the Little Flower, Royal Oak, Michigan
- St. Mark's Episcopal Church, Grand Rapids Michigan
- Christ Church, Boston, Massachusetts
- All Saints Church, Pasadena, California
- Church of the Incarnation, Great Falls, Montana
- Saint Paul's Episcopal Church, Lansing, Michigan
- Christ Episcopal Church, Ottawa, Illinois
- First (Park) Congregational Church, Grand Rapids, Michigan
- The Emmanuel Lutheran Church, Rockford, Illinois
- Wicker Park Lutheran Church, Chicago, Illinois
- Grosse Pointe Memorial Church, Grosse Pointe, Michigan
- Christ Episcopal Cathedral, Salina, Kansas
- Hope Church (Reformed Church in America), Holland, Michigan
- Zion Evangelical United Church of Christ (Indianapolis, Indiana)
- St. Marcus Evangelical & Reformed (United Church of Christ) (St. Louis, Missouri)
- St. John's Episcopal Church, Detroit, Michigan
- Trinity Episcopal Church, Bay City, Michigan
- Central United Methodist Church, Detroit, Michigan. (Hughes 1967, www.centralumchurch.org)
- Sacred Heart Seminary; Detroit, Mi
- St. Matthew's - St. Joseph's Episcopal Church; Detroit, Mi
- High Street United Methodist Church (Springfield, Ohio)
- St. Mark's Episcopal Pro-Cathedral (Hastings, Nebraska)
- Union Avenue Christian Church (St. Louis, MO)
