= Rockefeller Chapel =

Church building in Chicago, Illinois

- Rockefeller Memorial Chapel
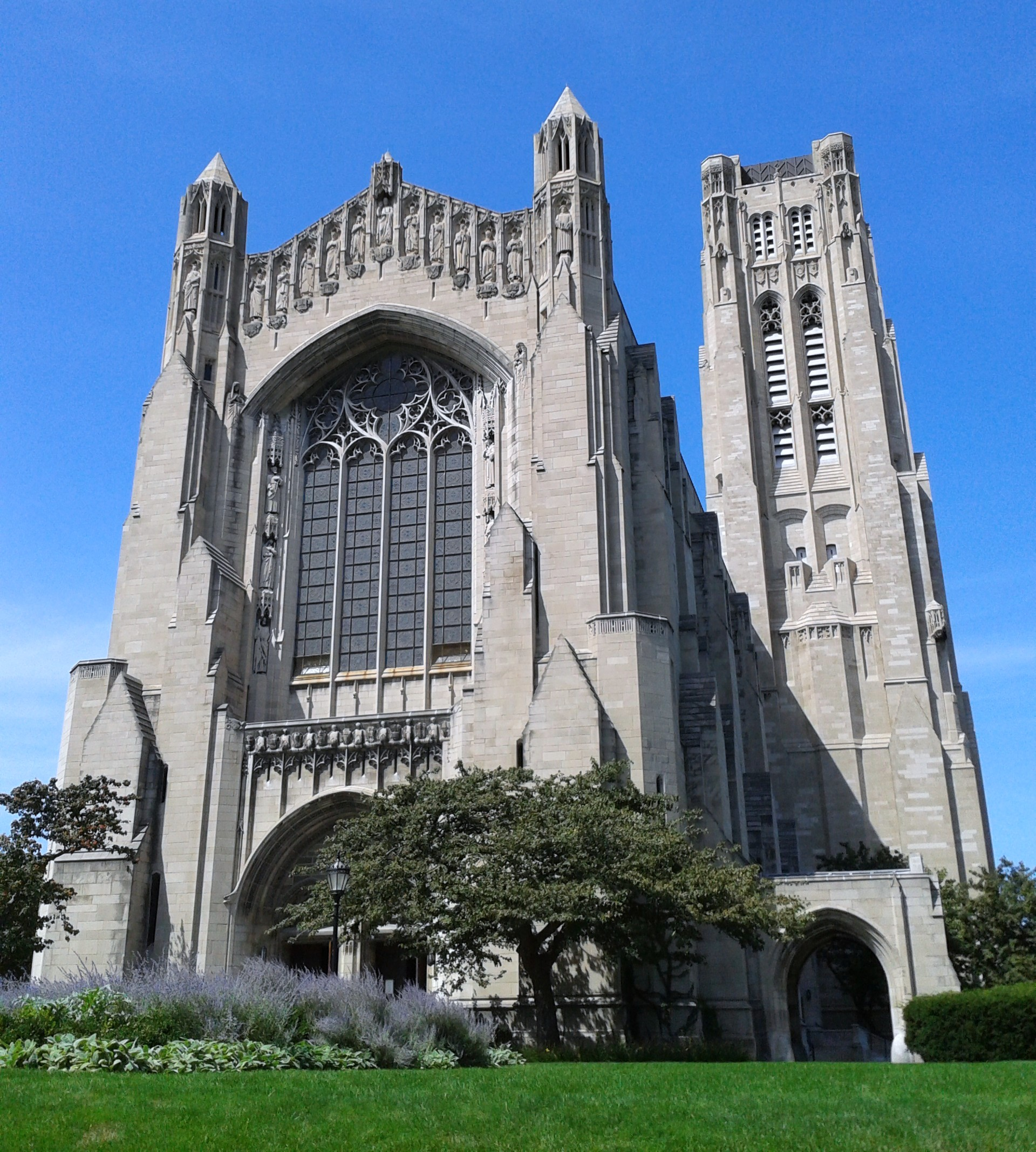
- Front view of the Chapel
- Rockefeller Chapel
- 41.7885°N 87.5970°W
- Address: 5850 S. Woodlawn Avenue; Hyde Park, Chicago, Illinois
- Country: United States
- Website: Official website

Architecture
- Architects: Bertram Goodhue; Lee Lawrie and Ulric Ellerhusen (sculptors); Hildreth Meière (interior); Alois Lang (carvings)
- Architectural type: Gothic Revival
- Style: Collegiate Gothic
- Years built: 1925–1928

Specifications
- Capacity: 1700
- Height: 200.7 feet (61.2 m)

Clergy
- Dean: Maurice Charles

Rockefeller Chapel is a Gothic Revival chapel on the campus of the University of Chicago in Chicago, Illinois. A monumental example of Collegiate Gothic architecture, it was meant by university patron John D. Rockefeller to be the "central and dominant feature" of the campus; with a carillon tower at 200.7 feet (61.2 m) it is by covenant the tallest building on campus and seats 1700. The current dean is Maurice Charles, an Episcopal priest.

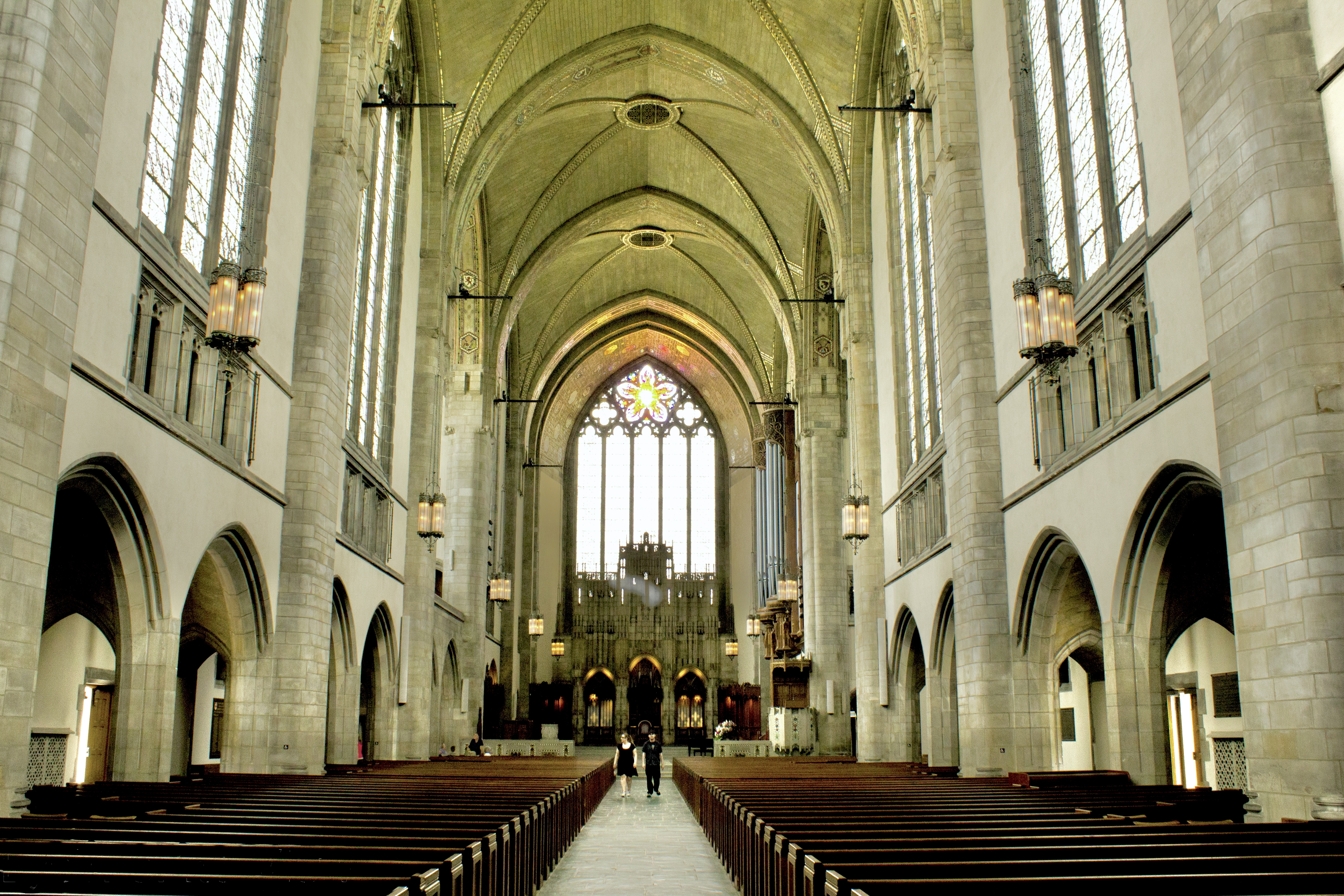
Interior view, 2013

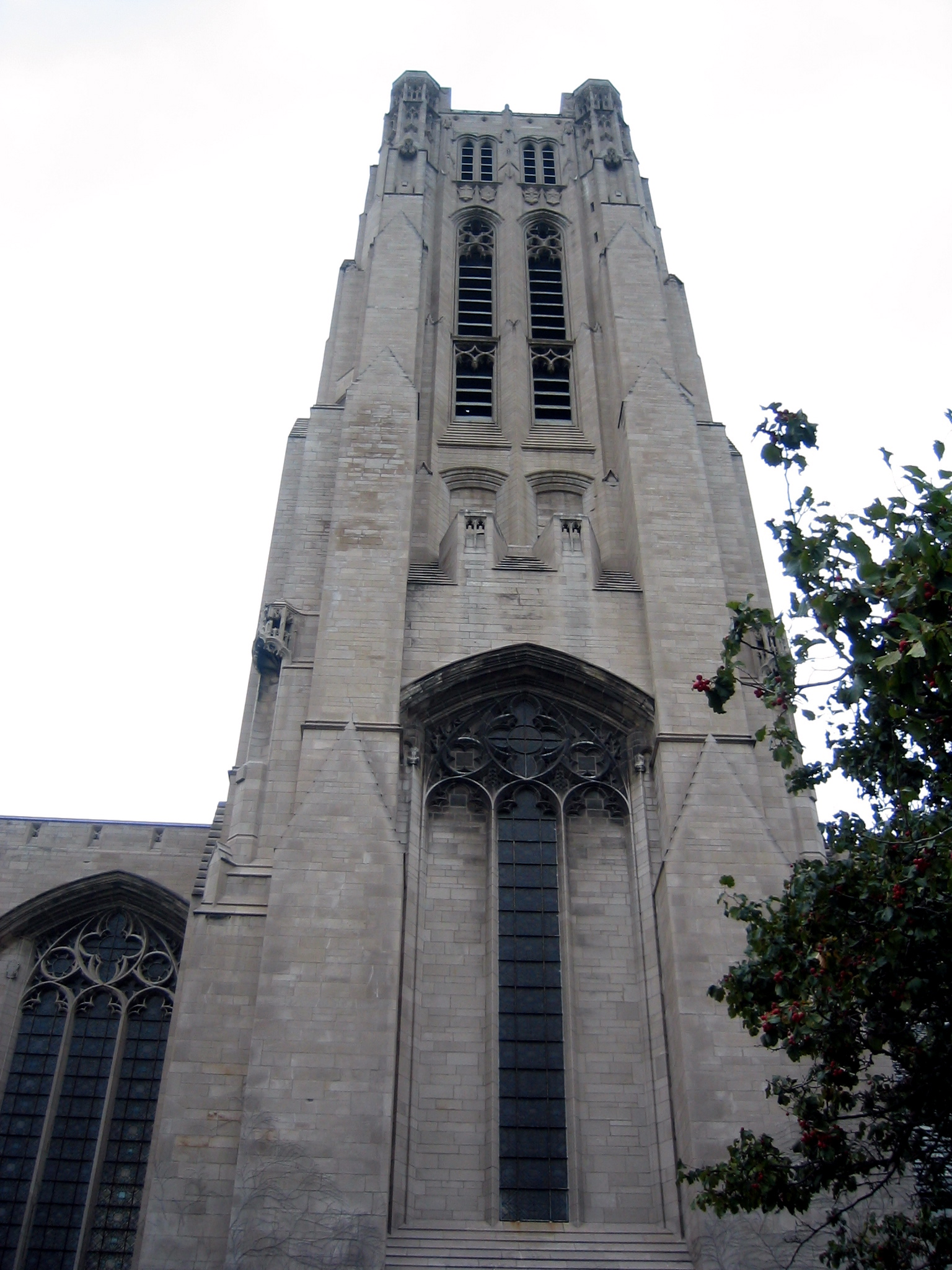
The carillon tower of the Rockefeller Chapel.

== Design ==
Designed by architect Bertram Goodhue between 1918 and 1924, and built between 1925 and 1928 without the use of structural steel, it contains about 70 integrated figural sculptures by sculptors Lee Lawrie and Ulric Ellerhusen, and interior work by mosaicist Hildreth Meière. Today the chapel is used for ecumenical worship services, university convocations, guest speakers, musical programs, weddings, memorial services, and occasional film screenings. It occupies most of a block and can seat 1700 people.

The woodcarvings that adorn the organ and South balcony were created by Alois Lang, a Master Woodcarver at the American Seating Co., and one of the artists responsible for bringing the medieval art of ecclesiastical carving back to life. His pieces in Rockefeller Chapel are carved from White Appalachian Oak.

== Carillon ==
The chapel contains the Laura Spelman Rockefeller Memorial Carillon and tower, a separate gift from John D. Rockefeller Jr. in 1932 in honor of his mother. This 72-bell carillon is the second-largest carillon in the world by mass, after the carillon at Riverside Church on the Upper West Side of New York City, which Rockefeller Jr. also donated in honor of his mother.

Carillonists

1. 1932–1953. Frederick L. Marriott (1901–1989)
2. 1953–1960. James Raymond Lawson (1919–2003)
3. 1960–1969. Daniel Robins (1937–1970)
4. 1969–1984. Robert Lodine (1928–1985)
5. 1984–2015. Wylie Crawford (assistant carillonist from 1974)
6. 2015–2022. Joseph (Joey) Brink
7. 2022–present. Alex R. Johnson

== Deans ==
1. 1928–1947. Rev. Charles Whitney Gilkey (1882–1968). Baptist

2. 1948–1958. Rev. John B. Thompson (1907–1974). Presbyterian

1958–1965. Vacant

3. 1965–1978. Rev. Edwin Spencer Parsons (1919–2013). Baptist

4. 1979–1995. Rev. Dr. Bernard ‘Bernie’ Owen Brown (1930–2023). Episcopal. Associate Dean 1967–1979

5. 1995–2007. Rev. Dr. Alison L. Boden. United Church of Christ

6. 2008–2019. Rev. Dr. Elizabeth Davenport. Episcopal

7. 1 July 2019–present. Rev. Dr. D. Maurice Charles. Episcopal

== Concerts ==
The Rockefeller Chapel hosts a variety of musical events, usually hosting jazz and classical music events like carillon recitals. Notably, the chapel hosted Geese frontman, Cameron Winter, in a pair of highly anticipated solo shows in December of 2025.
