= Wicker Park District =

Historic district in Chicago, Illinois, United States

Coordinates: 41°54′30″N 87°40′47″W

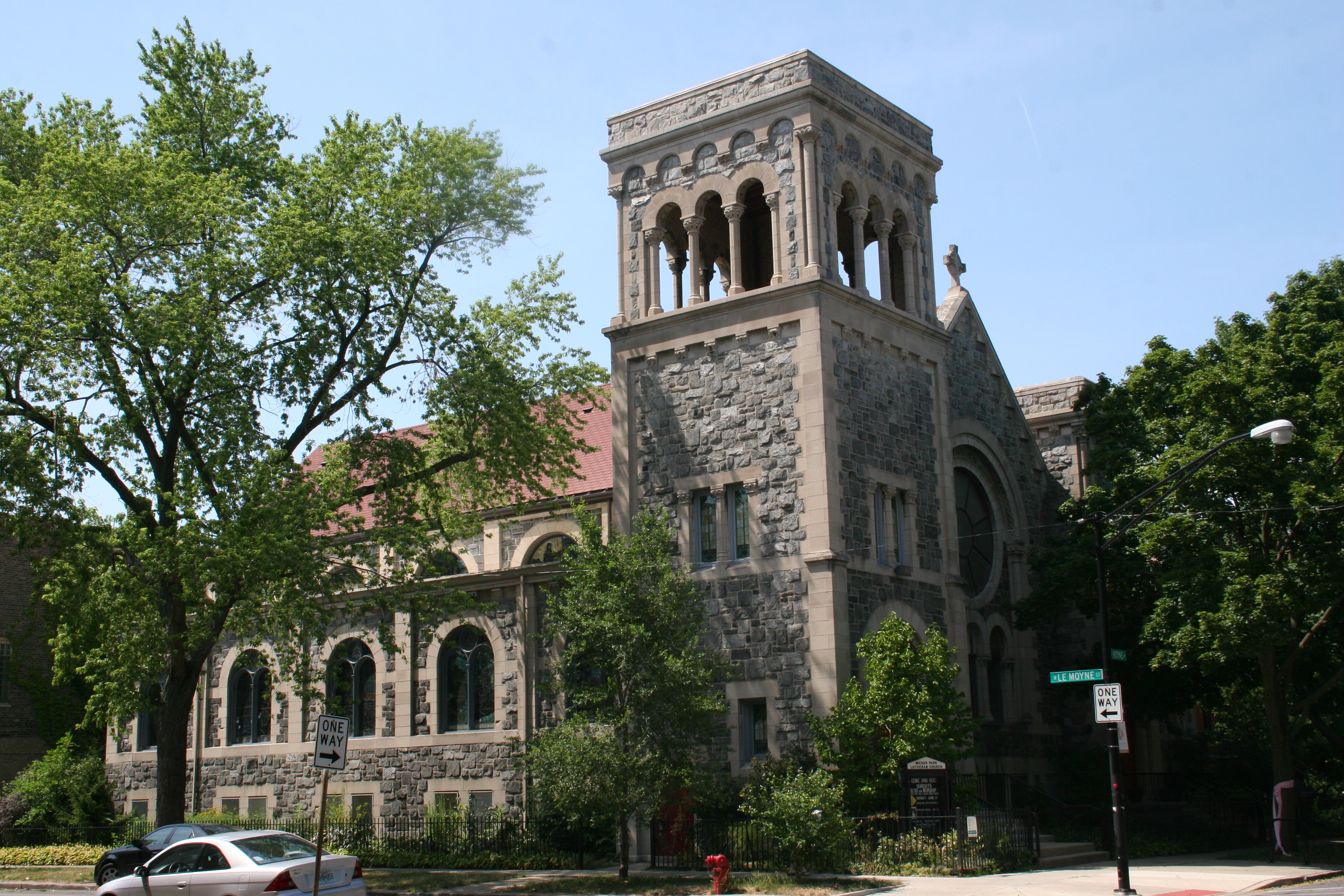
Wicker Park Lutheran Church at Hoyne Avenue and Le Moyne Street

The Wicker Park District is a Chicago Landmark district in the West Town community area of Chicago, Illinois. Its irregular boundary follows North Bell Avenue, West Caton Street, North Leavitt Street, West Potomac Avenue, and the Chicago 'L' tracks to the east. The district contains buildings dating from 1870 to 1930 and was designated a Chicago Landmark on April 12, 1991.

== History and architecture ==
The district takes its name from the triangular public park donated to the city in 1870 by developer and politician Charles Wicker and his brother Joel. Its housing ranges from workers' cottages to large Victorian residences and includes Italianate, Queen Anne, Romanesque, Beaux-Arts, Tudor Revival, and other styles. Many of the area's largest late-19th-century houses stand along Pierce and Hoyne streets. Hoyne became known as "Beer Baron Row" because several brewery owners built residences there. The district's early residents were largely German and Scandinavian; later Polish settlement led to the name "Polish Gold Coast".

The municipal landmark district is distinct from the Wicker Park Historic District listed on the National Register of Historic Places. The federal district was listed on June 20, 1979 for its architectural significance, has a period of significance of 1875 to 1899, and is described by different boundaries.
