= Oregon Pioneer =

Sculpture in Salem, Oregon, U.S.

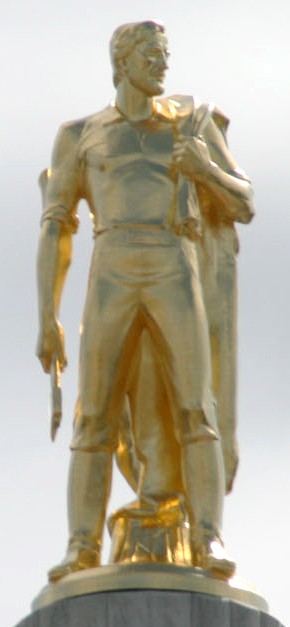
- The sculpture in 2007
- Artist: Ulric Ellerhusen
- Year: 1938
- Type: Sculpture
- Medium: Bronze, gold leaf
- Dimensions: 6.7 m (22 ft)
- Location: Salem, Oregon, United States; 44.938466°N 123.030374°W

Oregon Pioneer, also known as Gold Man, is an eight-and-a-half ton bronze sculpture with gold leaf finish that sits atop the Oregon State Capitol in Salem, Oregon, United States. Created by Ulric Ellerhusen, the statue is a 22 ft (7 m)-tall hollow sculpture. The gilded piece was installed atop the building in 1938 when a new capitol was built.

== History ==
The "brawny woodsman", as Time magazine called it, was built in New Jersey by sculptor Ulric Ellerhusen. While under construction, Ellerhusen had a large door built in order to allow him to move the statue outdoors to view how it would look in natural lighting. It was finished in 1938 and shipped to Oregon for installation on top of the new capitol building. The previous capitol building had burned in 1935. Shipped to Oregon via the Panama Canal, the statue then traveled by rail to Salem, and then by truck to the capitol. Installation began on September 17, 1938, when the pioneer was hoisted to the top of the building as the installation took several days and was briefly delayed in order for the contractor to find heavier duty equipment to lift the heavy statue.

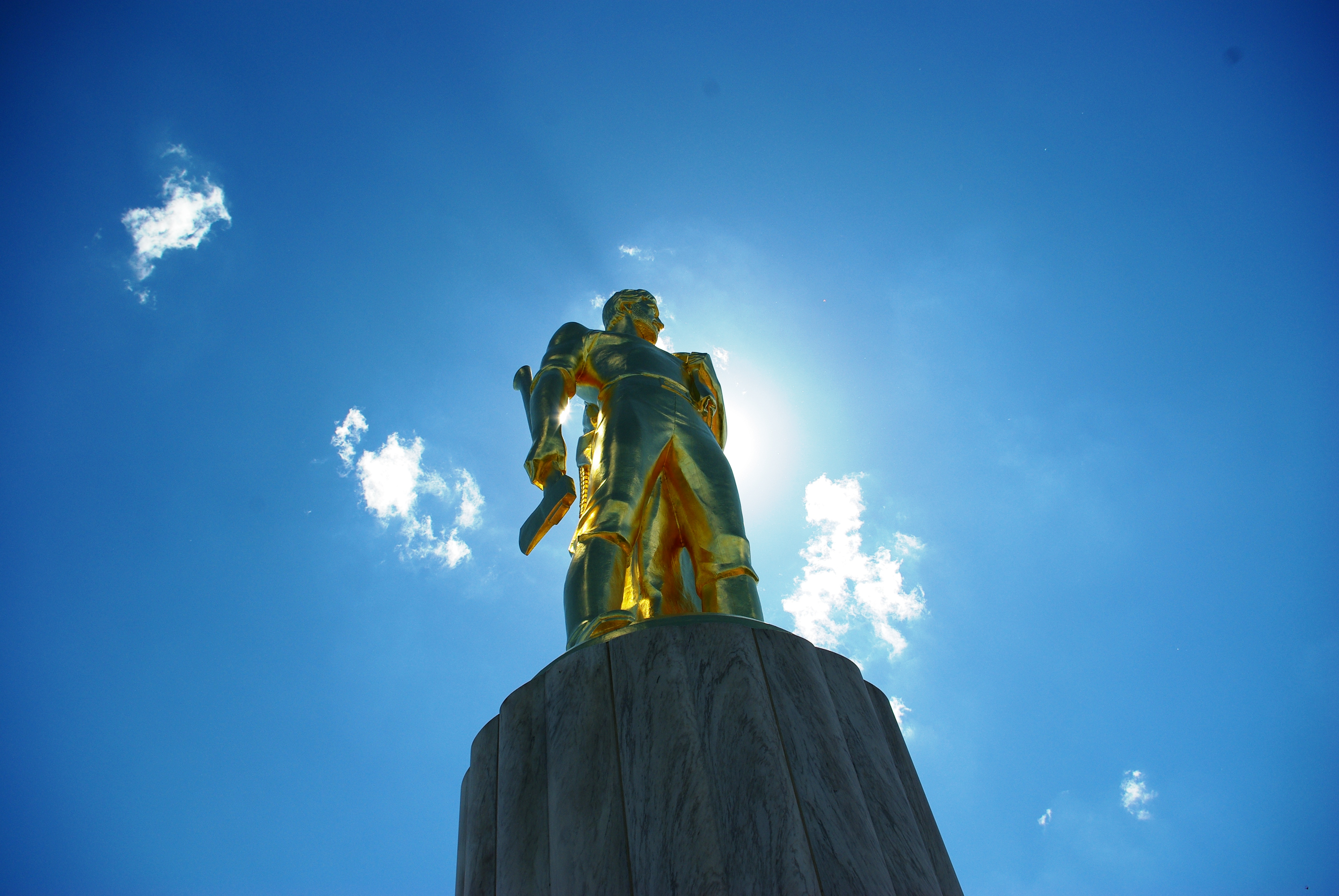
Close up from top of building

Although the rotunda of the capitol that the statue rests upon was damaged in the 1993 Scotts Mills earthquake, the statue itself was unharmed even though it did shift. The Oregon Pioneer statue has been finished with a new layer of gold leaf four times in its history. First in 1939 and again in 1958 by Bob Fulton, then in 1984 by John Edwards and Roy Darby. Then in September 2000, it was re-gilded for the fourth time by Lee Littlewood, Peter McKearnan and Nancy Comstock. The 1984 re-gilding of the statue was funded by Oregon school children through a penny drive. The fundraising effort raised over $37,000.

In January 2001 the Capitol stopped lighting the pioneer at night. This was to save energy during the Western Energy Crisis. Then in April 2002 solar panels were installed on the building to power the floodlights that illuminate the statue at night. These panels generate an average of 7.8 kilowatts and were the first solar panels ever installed on a state capitol. The 850-square-foot (79 m^{2}) array cost $60,000 and was purchased by Portland General Electric using a special ratepayer financed fund dedicated to purchasing from renewable energy sources. As the solar array produces twice as much power as is needed, the additional energy is sent to the power grid and is enough to power roughly one home for eight months out of the year.

== Details ==
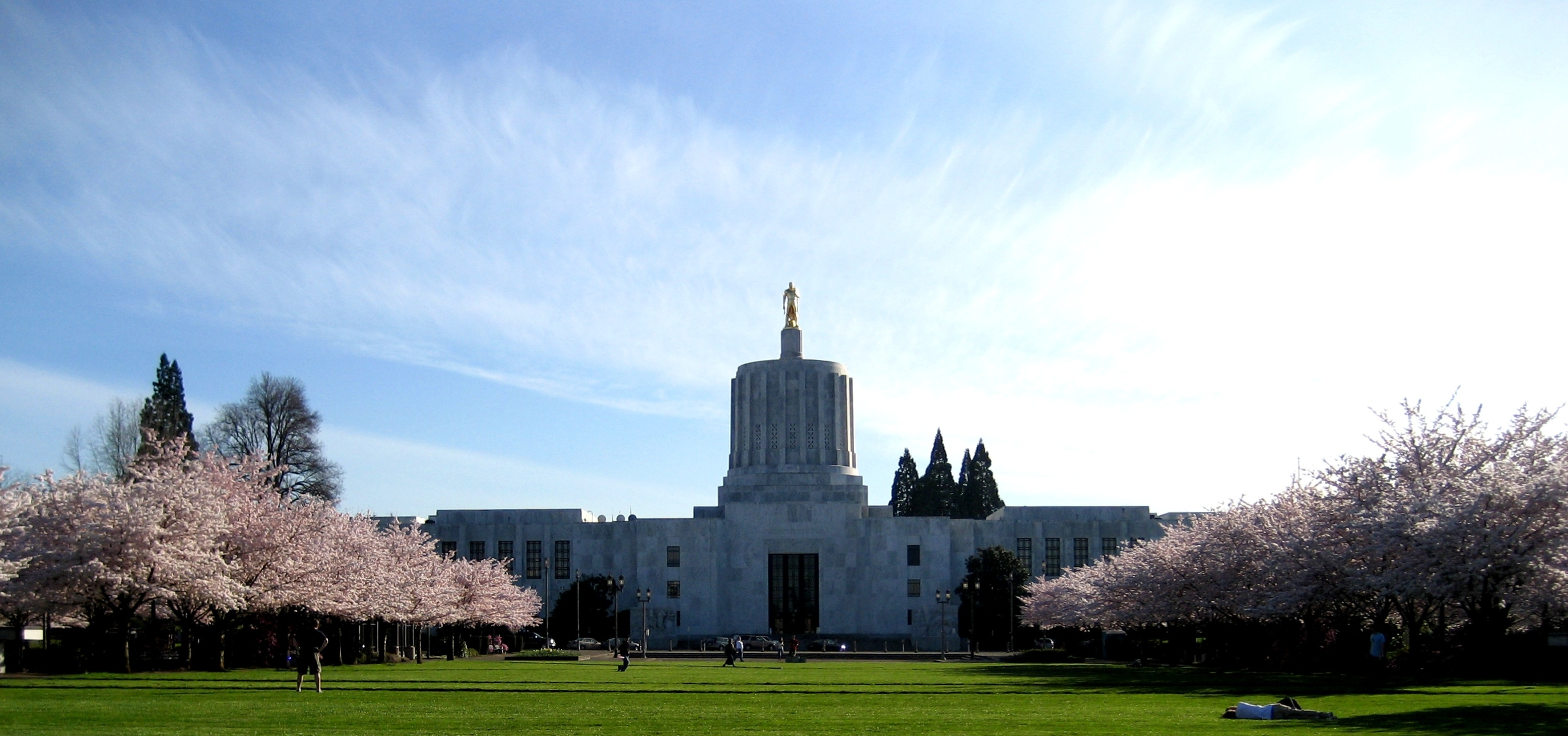
The statue on top of the state capitol

The statue sits 140 feet (43 m) above the ground on top of the Capitol's rotunda. It can be reached by a 121-step spiral staircase that starts on the building's fourth floor. The pioneer is 22 feet (6.7 m) tall and sits on a 23-foot (7.0 m) tall marble base. The head measures six feet ten inches in circumference. Hollow inside, the bronze artwork weighs 8.5 short tons (7.7 t) with a gold leaf finish. The gold leaf is 23K gold and must be refurbished every so often due to physical abrasion from dust (and scratches from bird claws).

The pioneer depicted holds a splitting axe in his right hand with the blade end facing the ground. In the other hand is a tarp, as according to the artist the pioneer was planning on building a shelter. The pioneer also has a beard and looks to the west while facing north. The capitol conducts tours that include trips to the base of the statue.

== See also ==
- 1938 in art
