= Alison Boden =

American academic

Alison L. Boden is the Dean of Religious Life and the Dean of the Chapel at Princeton University. She received an A.B. from Vassar, an M.Div. from Union Theological Seminary, and a Ph.D. from the University of Bradford (UK). Her writing and teaching interests have focused on such topics as human rights and religion, religion and violence, religion in the academy, and a variety of social justice issues. She is the author of Women's Rights and Religious Practice and is an ordained minister in the United Church of Christ.

Boden was previously Dean of Rockefeller Chapel at the University of Chicago from 1995 to 2007.
