= Ulric Ellerhusen =

German-American sculptor and teacher

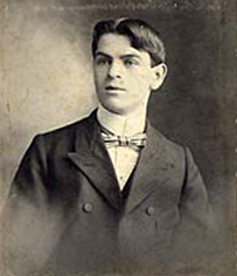
- Ellerhusen as a student
- Born: April 7, 1879; Waren, Mecklenburg, German Empire
- Died: November 9, 1957; Towaco, New Jersey
- Occupations: Sculptor and architect
- Notable work: Oregon Pioneer

Ulric Henry Ellerhusen (1879–1957) first name variously cited as Ulrich(the original German) or Ulrik, surname sometimes cited as Ellerhousen) was a German-American sculptor and teacher best known for his architectural sculpture.

His works include 70 sculptures for the University of Chicago's Rockefeller Chapel; a tympanum over the University's Oriental Institute; 4 statues for the Louisiana State Capitol; 5 exterior reliefs for the Oregon State Capitol; and the Oregon Pioneer statue.

== Life ==
Ellerhusen was born on April 7, 1879, in Waren, Mecklenburg, Germany and came to the United States in 1894.

=== Education ===
He studied at the Art Institute of Chicago under Lorado Taft, and under Gutzon Borglum and James Earle Fraser at the Art Students League of New York, and from 1906 through 1912 with Karl Bitter. He also studied at Cooper Union.

=== Sculpture and architectural work ===
In 1915, Ellerhusen contributed unusual inward-looking figural sculpture for the colonnade of Bernard Maybeck's Palace of Fine Arts, working under Bitter, who was the director of sculpture for the San Francisco Panama–Pacific International Exposition (1915).

In 1926, Ellerhusen worked with Lee Lawrie to produce about 70 integrated sculptural figures for the Rockefeller Chapel at the University of Chicago. Lawrie was responsible for the figures below the 30-foot level of the building, and Ellerhusen for the higher and less visible work. Ellerhusen's most notable contribution was the March of Religion, a series of fifteen monumental sized figures across the front gable. Unlike what is found in most churches, the people represented were not just drawn from the Judeo-Christian tradition but included Zoroaster and Plato as well as Abraham, Moses, the Prophets, Elijah and Isaiah and John the Baptist. Christ holds the center position. Next to him is Peter, then the Apostle Paul, Athanasius, Augustine, Francis of Assisi, Martin Luther and John Calvin make up the remaining figures in the gable. Elsewhere on the building Ellerhusen created figures of Amos, Hosea, John Huss, William Tyndale, St. Monica and St. Cecilia as well as the emblems for Matthew, Mark, Luke and John.

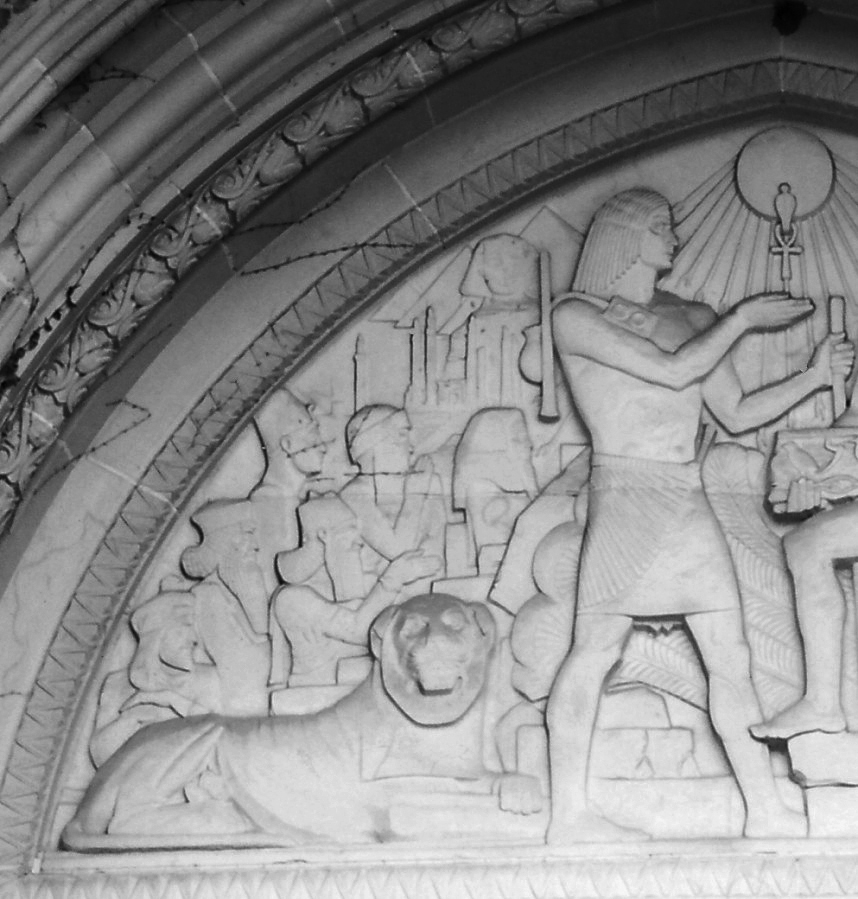
The East

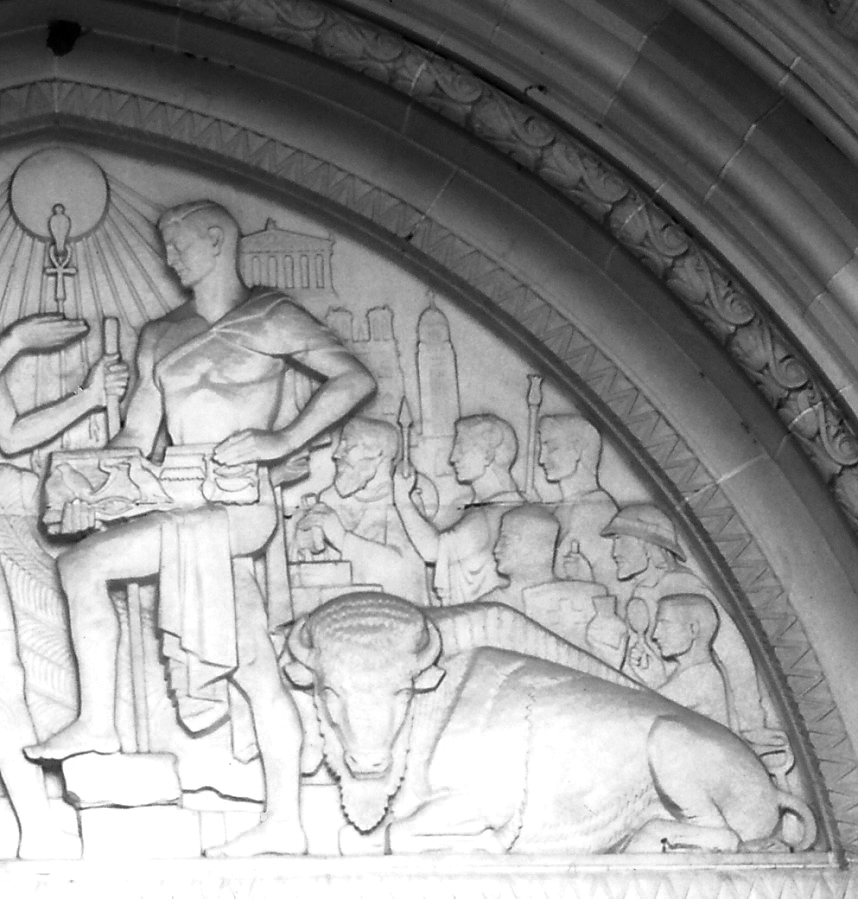
The West

Ellerhusen returned to the University of Chicago in 1931 to execute a panel for over the main entrance to the Oriental Institute's new building. This figures on this tympanum symbolize the passing of writing from the East to "vigorous and aggressive figure of the West.". The East is represented by a lion in the foreground with Zoser, Hammurabi, Thutmose III, Ashurbanipal, Darius the Great and Chosroes farther back. The West has a bison as its totem while its great men are Herodotus, Alexander the Great, Julius Caesar, a crusader and two modern men, an excavator and an archeologist. Various examples of the great buildings form the background of both sections. The building picked to represent modern architecture is Goodhue Livingston's Nebraska State Capitol.

Although Ellerhusen and Lawrie worked together on several buildings it is only at Goodhue's Christ Church Cranbrook (1928) that it is difficult to determine who did what. It is likely that each did several of the figures independently, but their styles are so similar, and in this case the figures representing such atypically ecclesiastical people as Wilbur Wright, Louis Pasteur, Michael Faraday, Galileo Galilei, Johannes Gutenberg, Leonardo da Vinci, Abraham Lincoln and George Washington are closer to Ellerhusen's more relaxed and naturalistic style than Lawrie's.

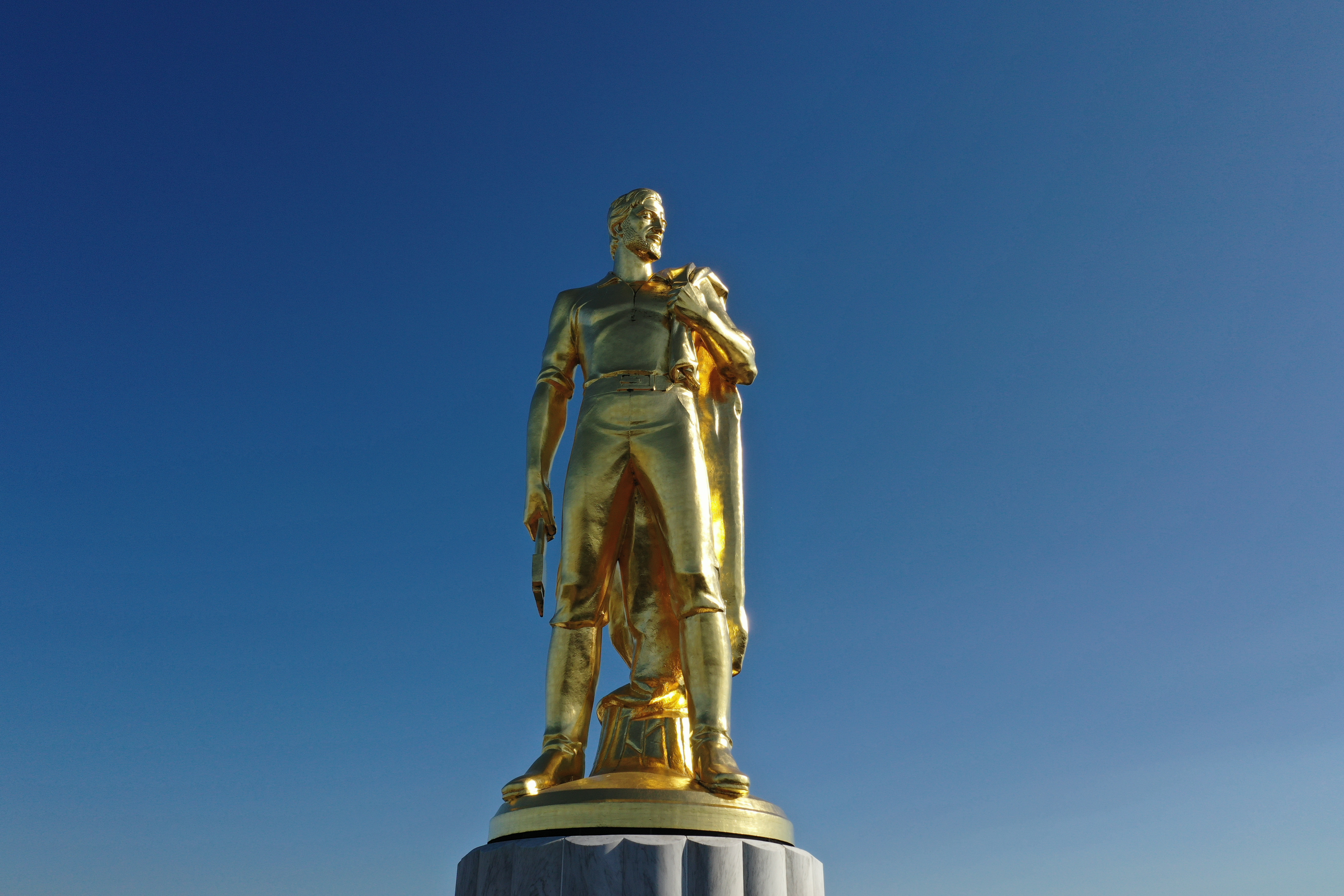
Ellerhusen completed Oregon State Capitol's golden statue, the Oregon Pioneer, in 1934

For the Louisiana State Capitol building Ellerhusen created "four colossal corner figures standing for 'four dominating spirits of a free and enlightened people,'" Law, Science, Art, and Philosophy. He also produced a frieze Louisiana: History and Life that is divided into five parts and wraps around the building at the fifth floor level. In one section Ellerhusen used a son (Solis Seiferth, Jr.) and a daughter (Carol Dreyfous) of the building's architects as models for figures of children in his design.

=== Later years ===
Ellerhusen, a longtime member of the National Sculpture Society, taught throughout much of his career, and spent the final years of his life in Towaco, New Jersey, where he had founded an art school and taught alongside his wife Florence Cooney Ellerhusen, a landscape painter.

== Gallery ==
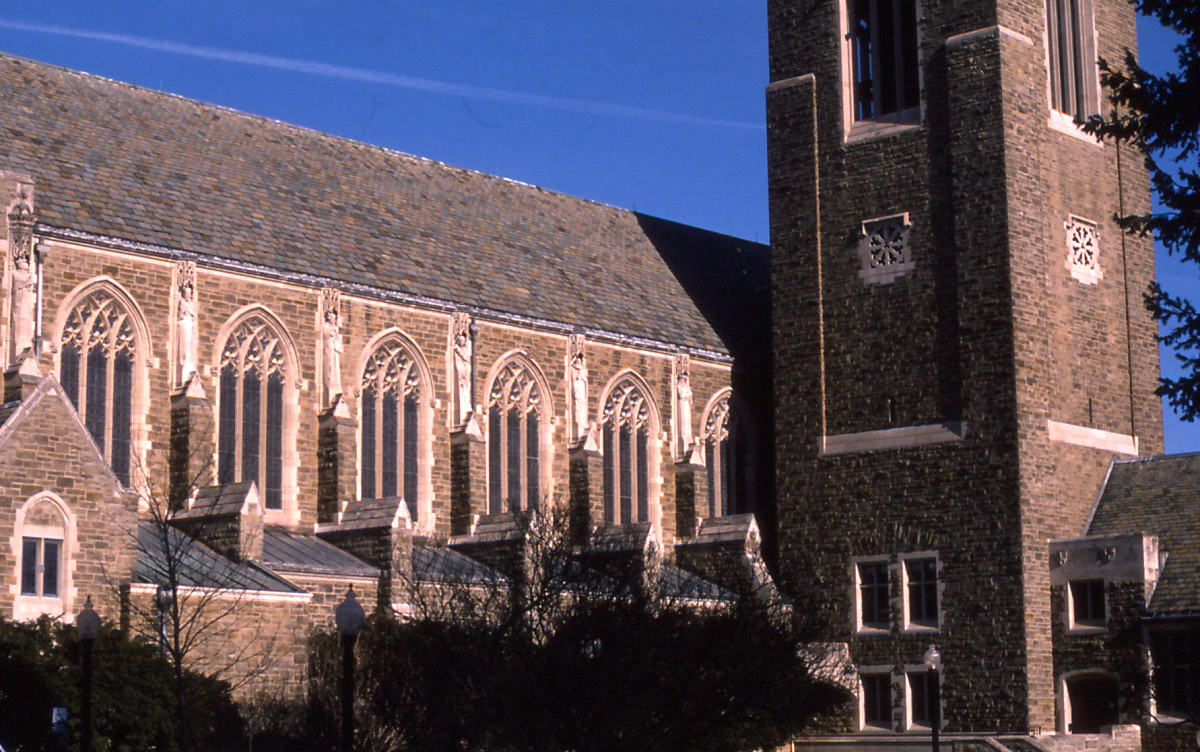
Christ Church, Cranbrook

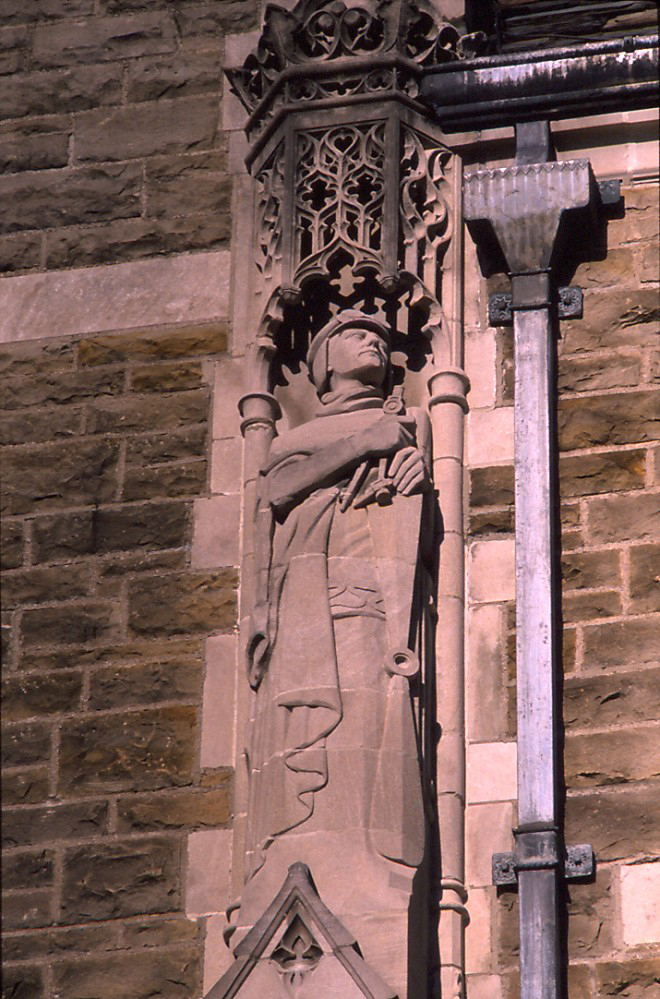
Wilbur Wright

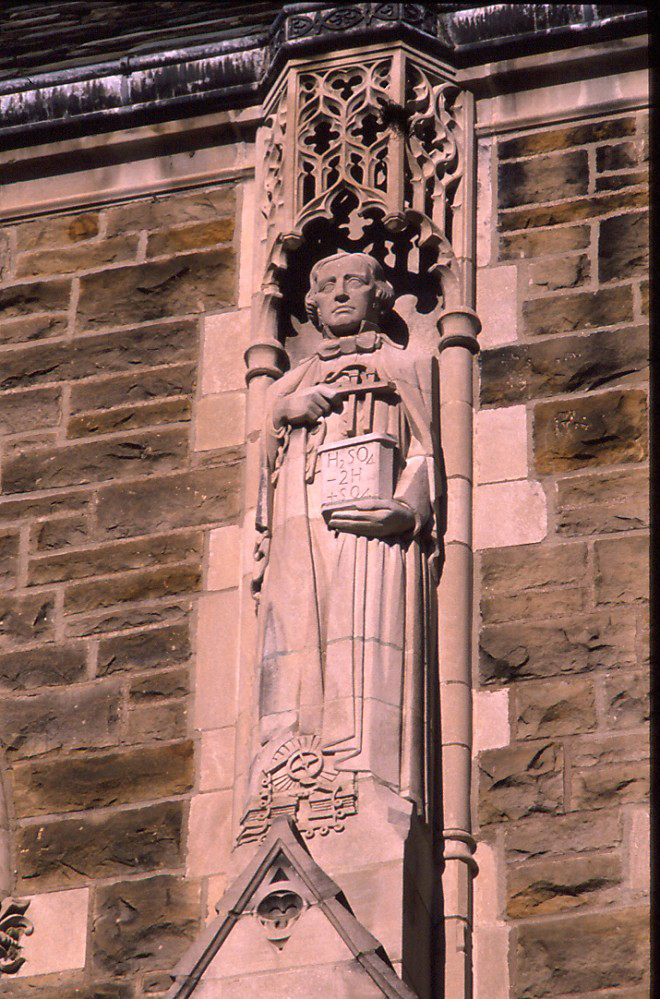
Michael Faraday

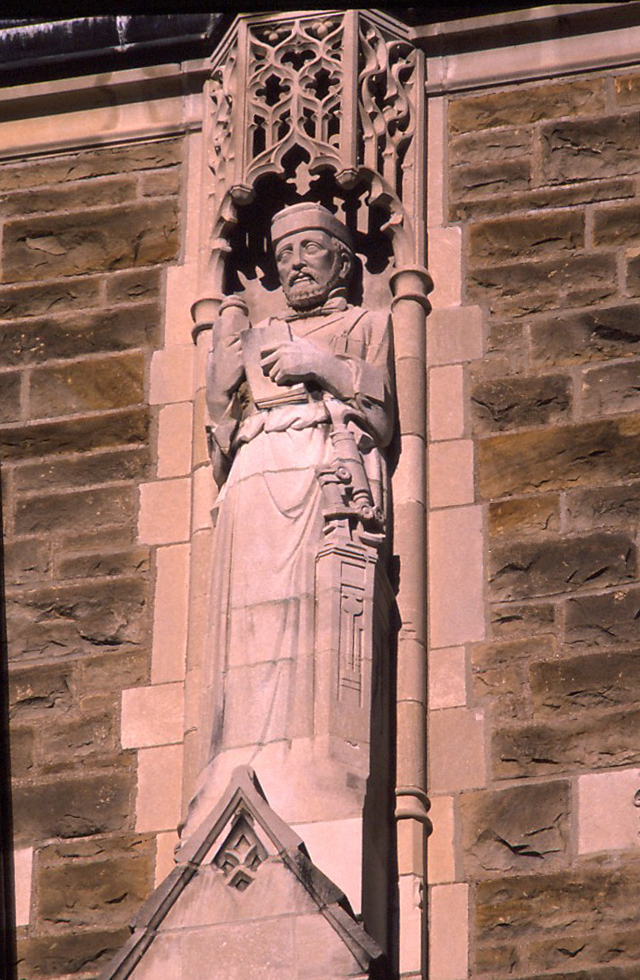
Louis Pasteur

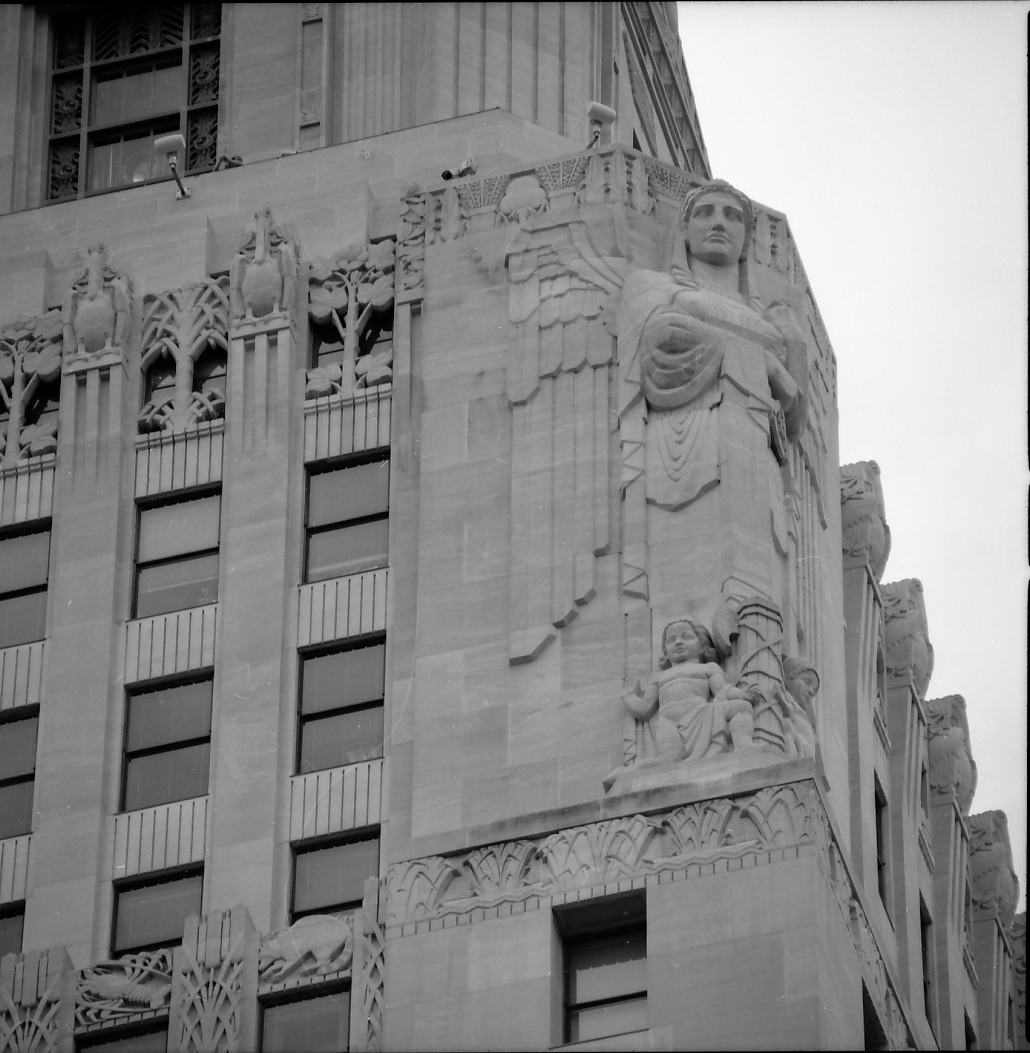
Law

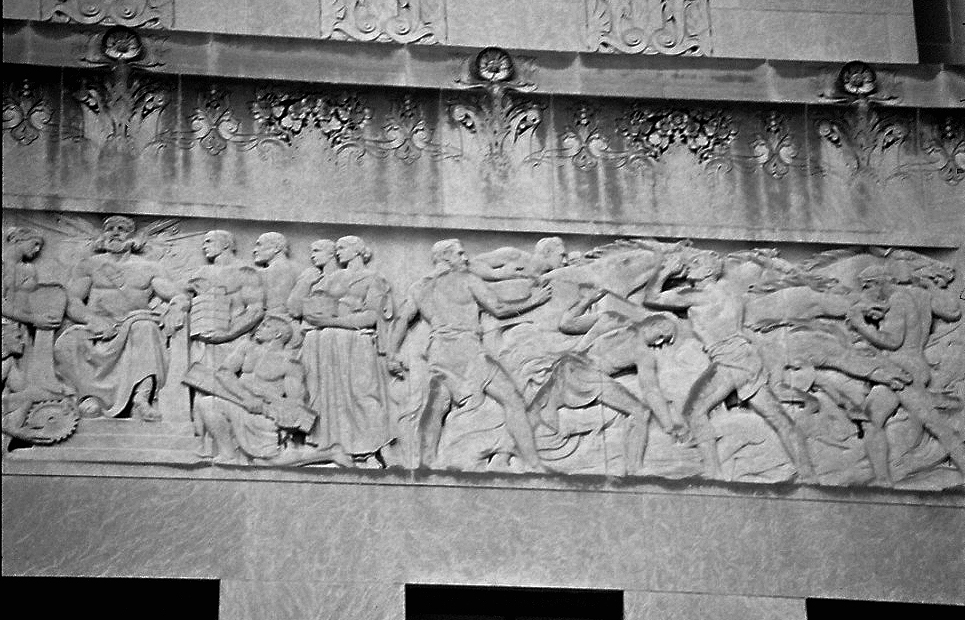
City Hall, Kansas City, Missouri

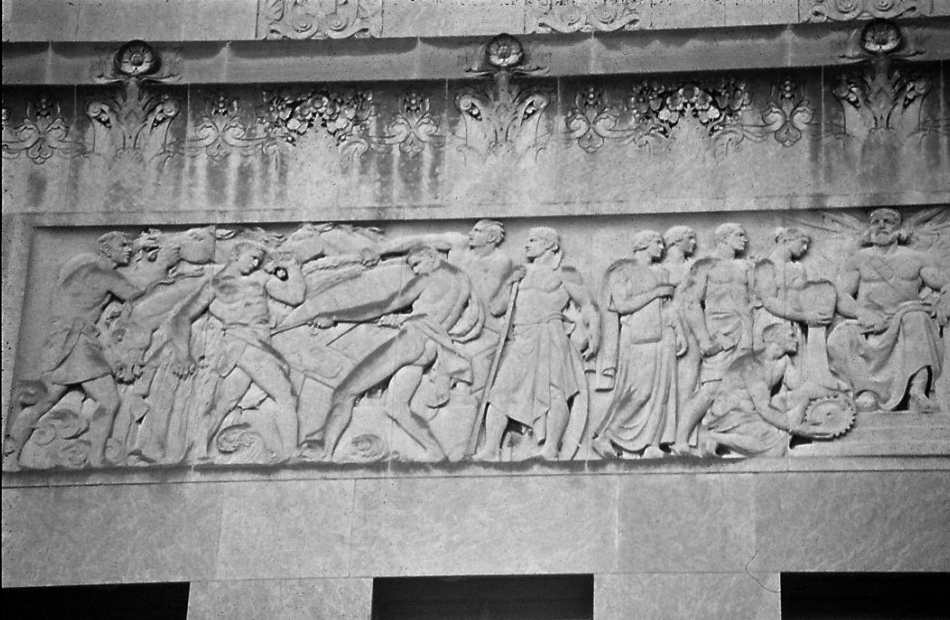
City Hall, Kansas City, Missouri

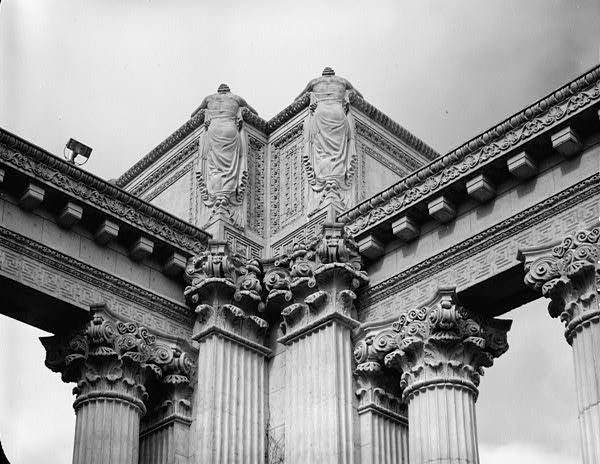
Figural sculpture representing 'Introspection' at the Palace of Fine Arts in San Francisco

The March of Religion on the Rockefeller Chapel, figure of Christ in the center

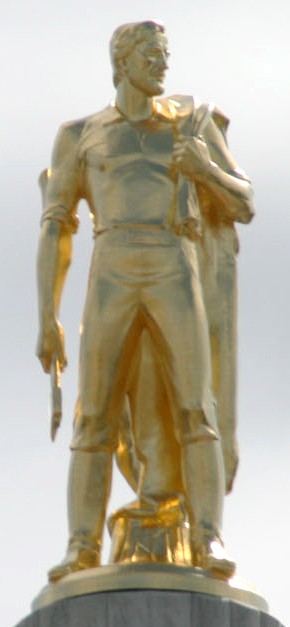
Oregon Pioneer atop the Oregon State Capitol building

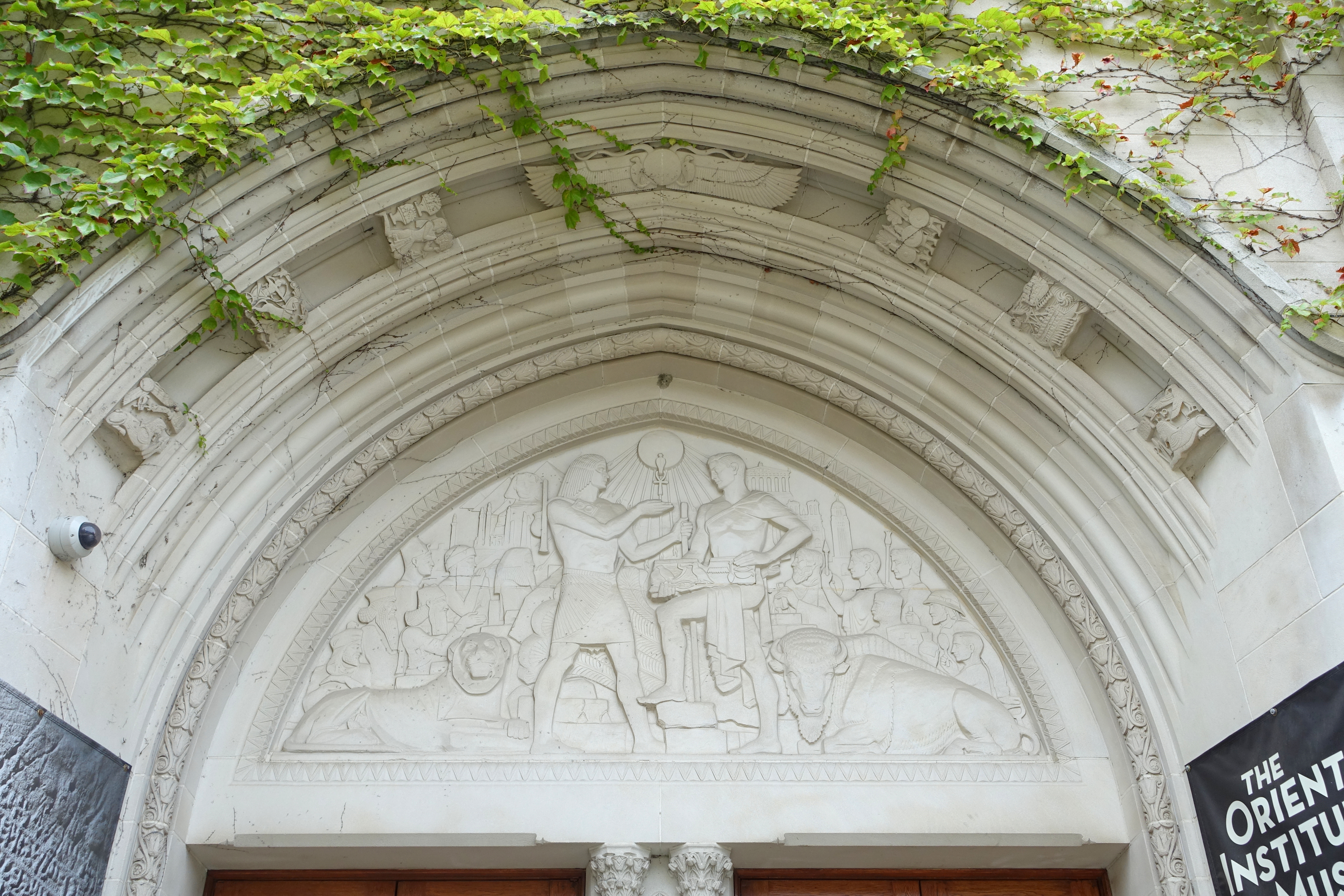
Doorway tympanum of the Oriental Institute Museum, University of Chicago

== Selected works ==
- Altar of Democracy (Peace Monument), East Orange, New Jersey, 1922
- Rockefeller Chapel at the University of Chicago, 1926
- Christ Church Cranbrook, Bloomfield Hills, Michigan, 1928
- Louisiana State Capitol, 1932
- Panels Atomic Energy and Stellar Energy on the facade of the Electrical Building at the Chicago Century of Progress Exposition, 1933
- First Permanent Settlement of the West (aka Pioneer Monument), Old Fort Harrod State Park, Harrodsburg, Kentucky, with architect Francis Keally, 1934
- Kansas City City Hall, 1936, friezes on the east and west walls
- Gold Man (aka Oregon Pioneer) finial figure on the Oregon State Capitol, with Keally, 1938
