= American Seating Company Factory Complex =

- U.S. National Register of Historic Places
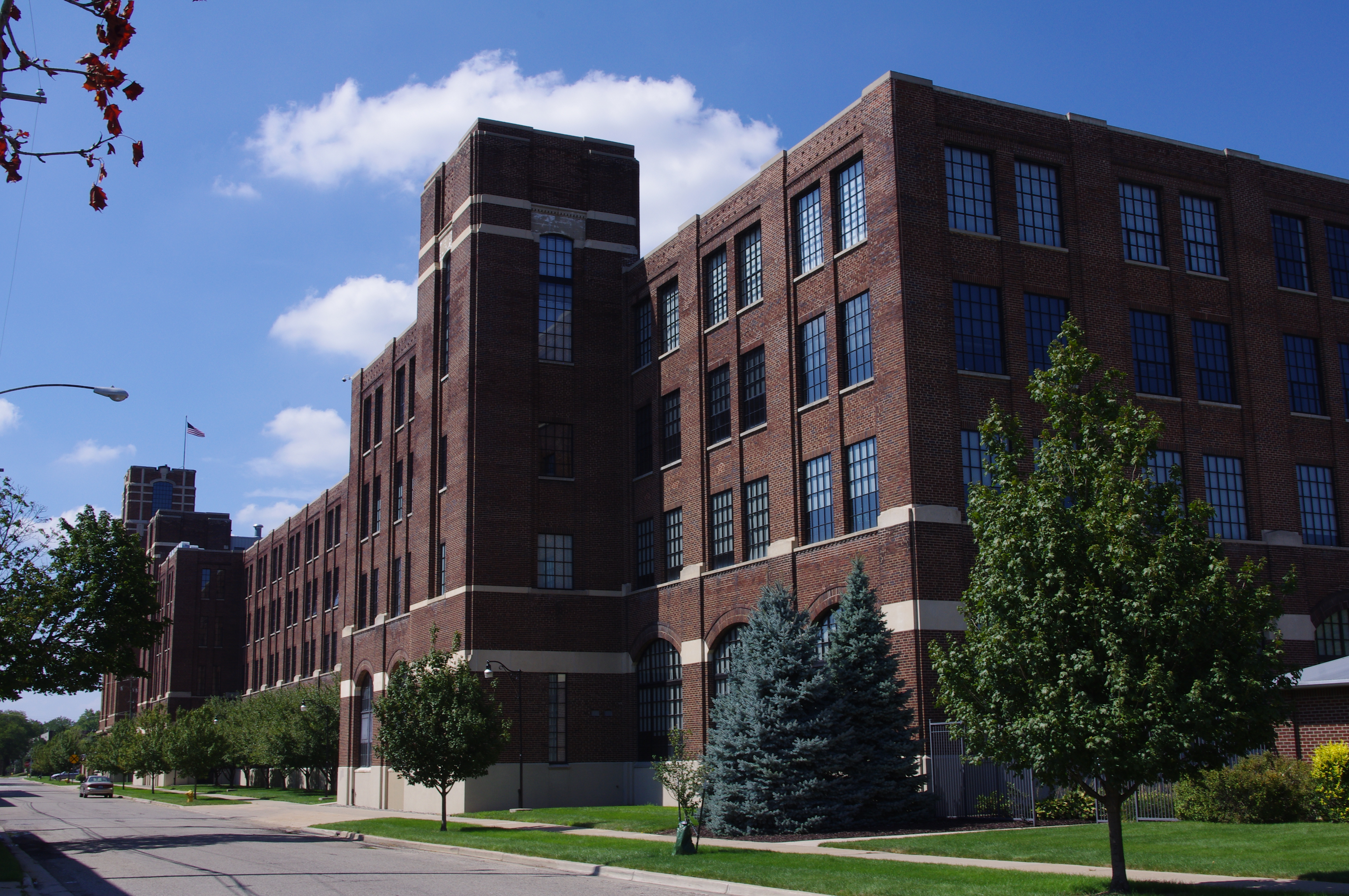

- Location within Michigan Location within the United States
- Interactive map
- Location: 801 Broadway Ave. NW, Grand Rapids, Michigan
- Coordinates: 42°58′43″N 85°40′52″W
- Area: 20 acres (8.1 ha)
- Built: 1888
- Architect: Osgood and Osgood; Neiler, Rich and Company
- Architectural style: Late Victorian, Early Commercial, et al
- NRHP reference No.: 03000687
- Added to NRHP: July 25, 2003

The American Seating Company Factory Complex is a historic manufacturing plant located at 801 Broadway Avenue NW in Grand Rapids, Michigan, used by the American Seating company. It was listed on the National Register of Historic Places in 2003.

== History ==
In late 1885, local Grand Rapids businessmen Gaius Perkins, William T. Hess and Seymour W. Peregrine founded the Grand Rapids School Furniture Company to manufacture school and office furniture. They began manufacture in a small factory in 1886. Business boomed, and in 1887 they began constructing a new factory. This was completed the next year, but an increase in orders soon forced to company to double its factory size. By 1888 the company was selling over 65,000 school desks per year. In 1899, the Grand Rapids School Furniture Company merged with eighteen other similar companies located around the nation to form the American School Furniture Company, with Gaius Perkin as its first president. In 1905 the name was changed to American Seating Company, and it was soon the largest employer in Grand Rapids.

In 1923, the company began work on a power plant and warehouse addition to the factory, which was completed in 1927. The company lasted through the Great Depression, and converted to wartime production during World War II. In the 1980s, the company faced financial hardships, and was eventually sold to Fuqua Industries of Atlanta, Georgia. It returned to local control in 1987.

In 2016, the original factory building was demolished.

== Description ==
The American Seating Company factory complex consists fourteen contributing buildings and two non-contributing buildings, ranging in date from 1888 to 1978, located in a parcel about twenty acres in size. The site runs along Broadway from Seventh to Eleventh Street. The 1888 factory building was located along the northern side of Ninth Street. This was a four-story cream brick building. The 1923 power plant and warehouse are located along Seventh Street. These buildings are four-story brick structures. Additional buildings, dating from the early 1900s through the 1970s, are located along Eleventh Street and south toward Ninth.
