= Emmanuel Episcopal Church (La Grange, Illinois) =

Historic church in Illinois, United States

- U.S. National Register of Historic Places
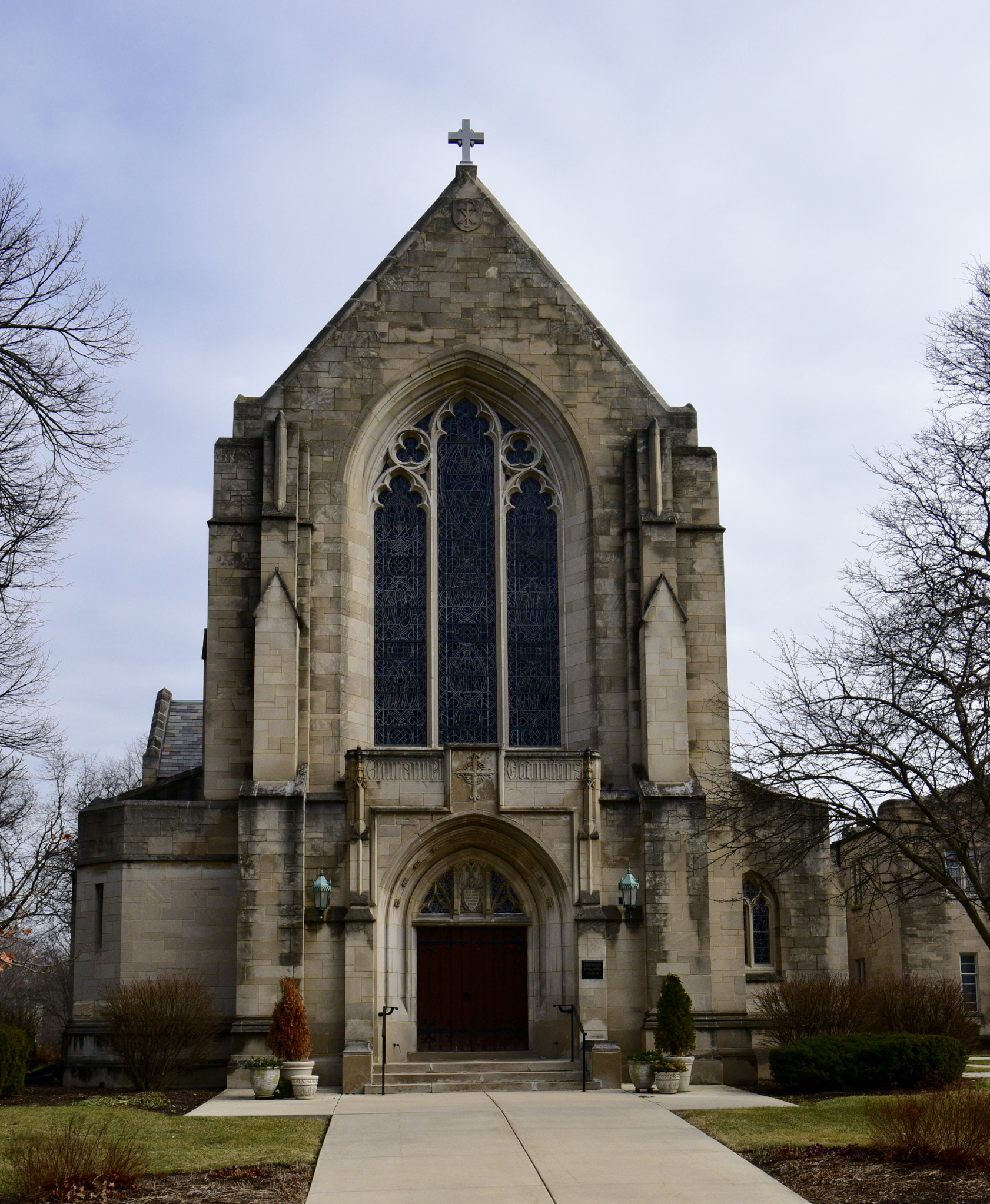

- Location within Chicago metropolitan area Location within Illinois Location within the United States
- Location: 203 S. Kensington Ave., La Grange, Illinois
- Coordinates: 41°48′37″N 87°52′28″W
- Built: 1925-26
- Architect: John Neal Tilton, Jr.
- Architectural style: Gothic Revival
- NRHP reference No.: 100001922
- Added to NRHP: December 28, 2017

Emmanuel Episcopal Church is a historic Episcopal church at 203 S. Kensington Avenue in La Grange, Illinois. La Grange's Episcopal congregation formed in 1872 and built its first church in 1878. The current church building was built in 1925–26 to replace the original church after it burned down in 1924. Architect John Neal Tilton, Jr., who was also a member of the congregation, gave the new church a Gothic Revival design inspired by cathedral architecture; the design bucked the contemporary tradition of giving suburban churches simple designs. The church's design includes an ashlar limestone exterior, lancet windows with stone surrounds, a parapet with a cross above the entrance, and a large entrance gable flanked by buttresses. The church's stained glass windows, which were installed over the course of a multi-decade program, were designed by multiple artists and feature scenes of everyday American life.

The church was added to the National Register of Historic Places on December 28, 2017.
