= American Seating =

Chair manufacturing company based in Grand Rapids, Michigan

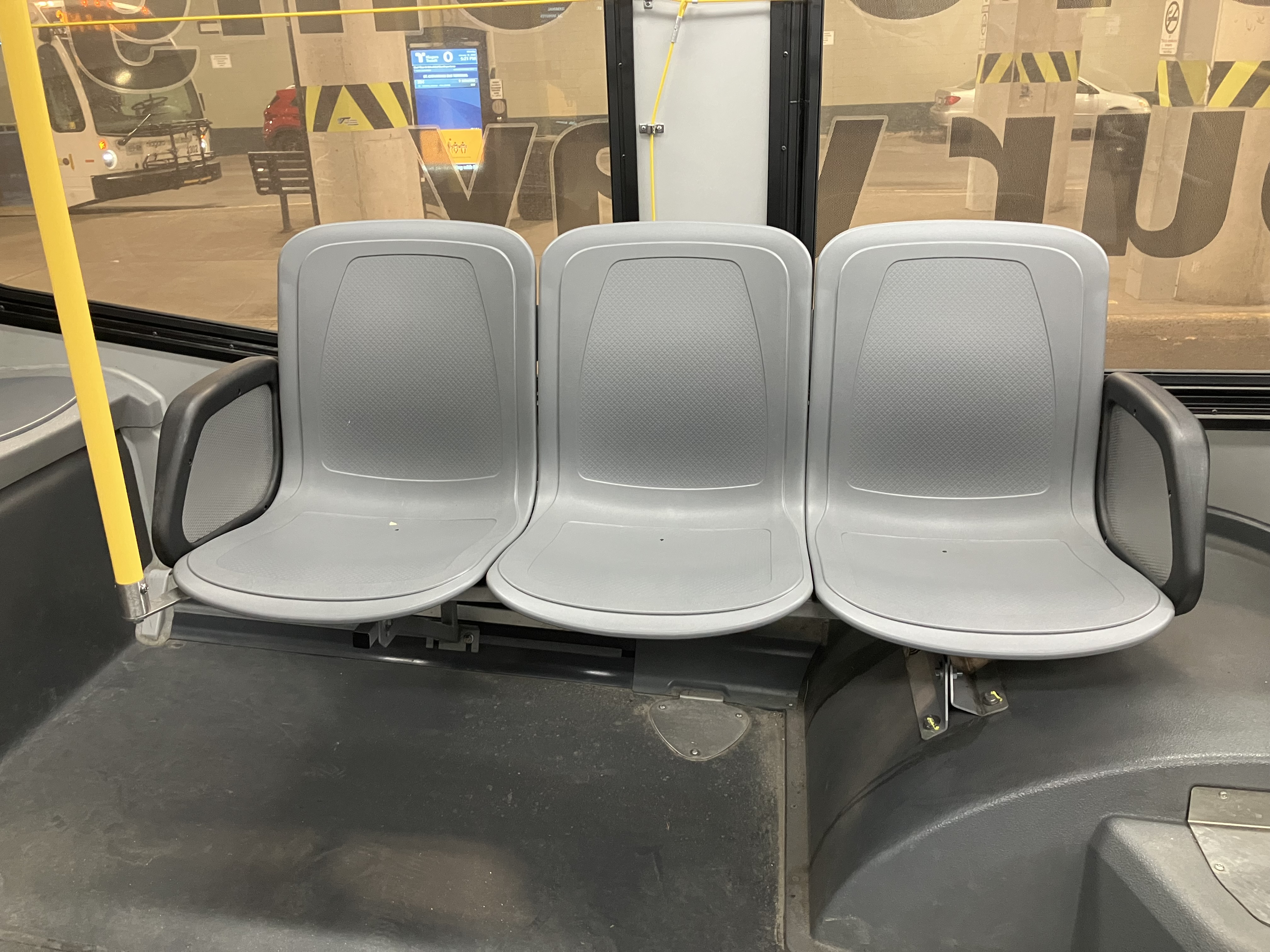
American Seating city service Bus seats used in a Niagara Transit bus

American Seating Inc. is a company specializing in the production of chairs and other seating, including seats for rail transport and public transportation, schools and churches. Founded in 1886 as the Grand Rapids School Furniture Company, the company is headquartered in Grand Rapids, Michigan, USA. The company gives its name to the American Seating rule, based on a lawsuit it participated in.

Various notable venues in the United States have featured seats produced by American Seating, including Radio City Music Hall and the Metropolitan Opera in New York City, Fenway Park in Boston, the now-demolished Candlestick Park in San Francisco, and the United States Senate chamber. The company discontinued manufacturing seats for stadiums, arenas and theatres in 2017. In October 2025, the assets of American Seating was acquired by NFI Group and Gillig.

== History ==
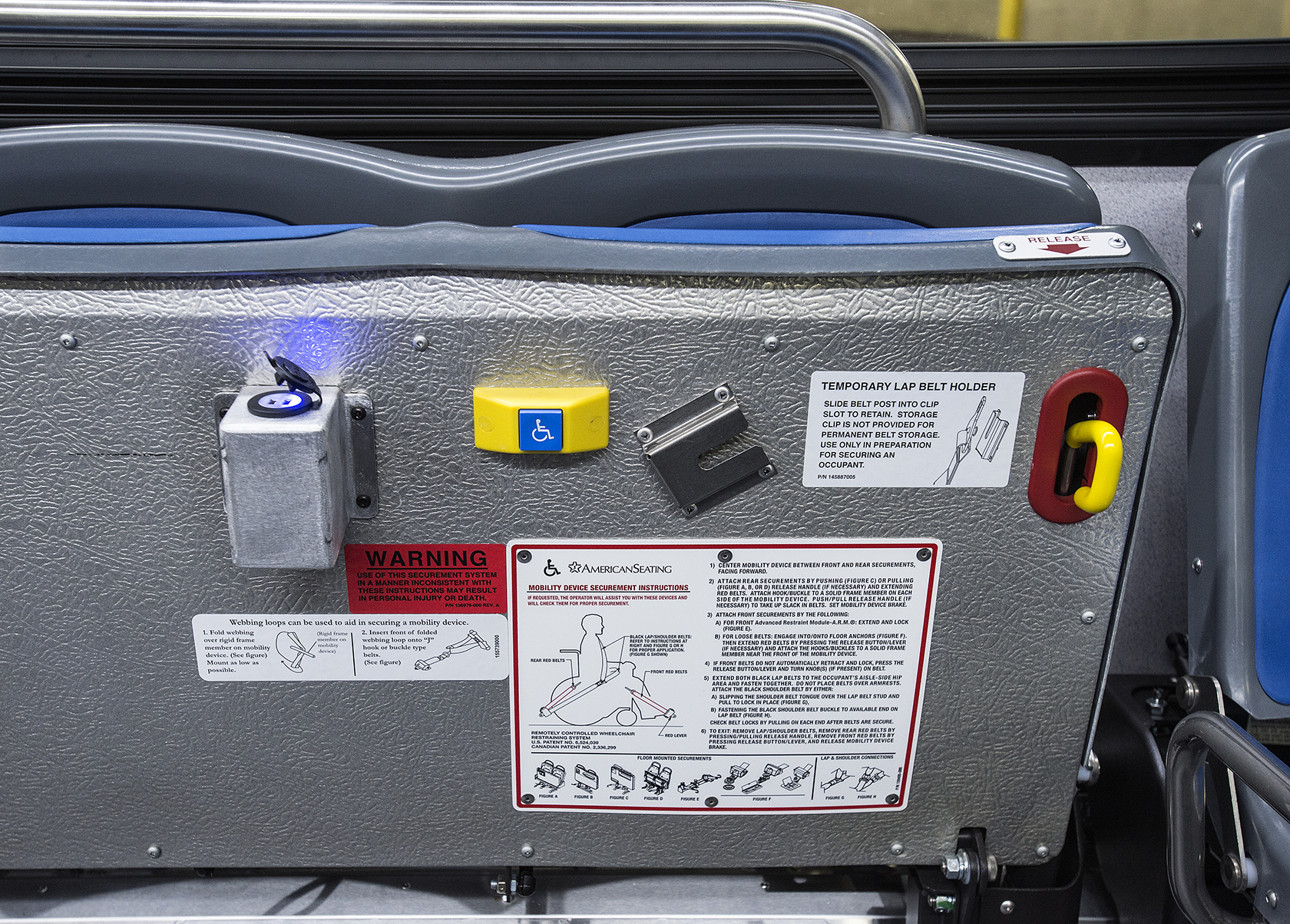
The bottom of an American Seating-built bus seat, flipped up to accommodate a handicapped passenger.

The company was founded in 1886 by three businessmen and members of the Grand Rapids school board. They opened a factory in Grand Rapids on January 5 of that year, manufacturing school and office furniture, particularly wooden school desks. The Grand Rapids School Furniture Company was officially incorporated on May 8, 1887. The company was able to utilize the favorable conditions that led Grand Rapid's furniture industry to blossom at this time. This included an abundance of forests for lumber, the presence of the Grand River, and an increasing immigrant population in the area providing labor. The company inaugurated its now-historic factory on August 1, 1888. In 1899, the company acquired and merged with 18 other furniture manufacturers, and was renamed American School Furniture Company.

Following the mergers, the company was accused on several occasions of operating as a trust within the furniture industry. In March 1900, the company was sued in New York for violating the Sherman Antitrust Act of 1890. In 1901, American School Furniture was sued by the stockholders of a Chicago company they recently acquired, also accusing the company of operating as a monopoly. In 1906, the company reorganized as the American Seating Company, incorporating in New Jersey. Shortly afterward in 1907, the company and 13 other associated furniture and appliance producers were fined for operating as a trust by Judge Kenesaw Mountain Landis in the anti-trust case, United States v. American Seating Co. The companies were referred to as the "Prudential Club". The proceedings also alleged that the purpose of the company's 1906 reorganization was to push out smaller stockholders. The company would be involved in other anti-trust suits, in 1940, and 1971.

Beginning in 1909 and continuing through the 1930s, American Seating installed the original seats in several iconic sporting venues in the United States. This included the first seats in Forbes Field, Comiskey Park, Fenway Park, Wrigley Field, and the original Yankee Stadium. By 1926, American Seating produced over half of the theatre, school, church, and lodge furniture in the United States. After having offices in New York and Chicago, the company consolidated its offices in Grand Rapids in 1931. During World War II, the company's production focused on the war effort. This included the production of seats for airplanes and tanks, as well as non-furniture military supplies. In 1947, the company began producing seats for city buses. In 1958, the company introduced the first molded plastic seats for stadiums, first installed in the Los Angeles Memorial Coliseum. Starting in 1960, the company expanded to the health care industry, including hospital beds. In 1970, the company began producing seats for railroad rolling stock. In 1982, American Seating sold off its classroom furniture business due to lower demand.

American Seating also operates its Canadian subsidiary, Otaco Seating in Newmarket, Ontario. The former Otaco plant in Orillia was closed in 2007.

American Seating announced on January 3, 2017, that it was selling its division that manufactured chairs for stadiums, arenas and theatres to the Irwin Seating Company. The transaction, which was finalized two months later in March, resulted in the layoff of 80 workers and an increased focus on transportation seating.

Then on May 18, 2023, that it would leave its headquarters and move to a new location in Grand Rapids.

NFI Group and Gillig announced it will acquire the assets of American Seating on October 18, 2025 under the joint venture of GR Seating, LLC.

== See also ==
- American Seating Company Factory Complex
