= Wicker Park Lutheran Church =

Lutheran church

Wicker Park Lutheran Church is a Lutheran church in Chicago, Illinois, United States. A congregation of the Evangelical Lutheran Church in America, it is the oldest active religious organization in the Wicker Park neighborhood. It serves as a gathering space in the community for worship, weddings, concerts, meetings, and summer camps.

Since 1879, the church has been at the corner of Hoyne Avenue and LeMoyne Street. It was added to the National Register of Historic Places in 1979.

== History ==
The church was formed in the 1870s by Lutheran European immigrants seeking an English-speaking worship environment. In 1906, when the church had outgrown its original building, warehouse architect A.C. Hansen designed the current Romanesque Revival-style building.

In the 1960s, as the Wicker Park neighborhood became primarily African American and Puerto Rican, the congregation resisted white flight, with members instead leading worship services in Spanish and providing after-school tutoring.

In the early 2000s, due to declining membership and rising costs, the church nearly closed. In 2006, it became a designated Reconciling in Christ worshipping community, publicly supporting the LGBTQ+ community.

=== Building renovations ===
In the 2020s, the church began a series of renovations on the building. In 2024, the church won one of Chicago's $250,000 Adopt-A-Landmark grants, used to preserve a piece of stained glass in the sanctuary. In 2026, after a $1.4 million fundraising campaign, the building became fully ADA compliant with the construction of a new entrance, elevator, and accessible bathroom.

=== LGBTQ+ vandalism ===
In 2019, a vandal spray-painted over one of the church's pride flags. Over the course of several months in 2023, a vandal repeatedly tore down more flags. In response to the 2023 vandalism, church pastor Rev. Jason Glombicki led the congregation in planting hundreds of small flags outside the building.
