= List of Oregon state agencies =

This is a list of official departments, divisions, commissions, boards, programs, and agencies of the government of the U.S. state of Oregon, including regional commissions and boards to which it is officially a party. Where a listing is that of a subdivision of another agency, the parent agency is indicated in parentheses.

== A ==
- Accountancy, Board of
- Administrative Hearings, Office of (Oregon Employment Department)
- Administrative Services, Department of
- Agriculture, Department of
- Air National Guard, Oregon (Oregon Military Department)
- Appraiser Certification and Licensure Board
- Architect Examiners, Board of
- Archives Division (Oregon Secretary of State)
- Arts Commission, Oregon (Oregon Economic and Community Development Department)
- Asian Affairs, Commission on
- Athletic Trainers, Board of
- Audits Division (Oregon Secretary of State)
- Aviation, Department of

== B ==
- Bar, Oregon State
- Black Affairs, Commission on
- Blind, Commission for the
- Body Piercing Licensing Program
- Brand Oregon
- Building Codes Division (Department of Building Codes Standards)

== C ==
- Capitol Foundation, Oregon State
- Capitol Planning Commission
- Child Care Division (Oregon Employment Department)
- Children, Adults and Families (Oregon Department of Human Services)
- Children and Families, Oregon Commission on
- Children's Trust Fund of Oregon
- Chiropractic Examiners, Board of
- Clinical Social Workers, Board of
- Columbia River Gorge Commission
- Community Colleges and Workforce Development, Department of
- Construction Contractors Board
- Consumer and Business Services, Department of
- Corporations Division (Oregon Secretary of State)
- Oregon Court of Appeals (Oregon Judicial Department)
- Corrections, Department of
- Cosmetology, Board of
- Court Procedures, Council on
- Counselors and Therapists, Oregon Board of Licensed Professional
- Criminal Justice Commission, Oregon
- Cultural Trust, Oregon

== D ==
- Dentistry, Oregon Board of
- Denture Technology, Board of
- Dietitians, Board of Examiners of Licensed
- Disabilities Commission, Oregon
- Dispute Resolution Commission
- Driver and Motor Vehicles Services (Oregon Department of Transportation)

== E ==
- Economic and Community Development Department
- Education, Department of (Oregon Superintendent of Public Instruction)
- Elections Division (Secretary of State)
- Electrologists, Permanent Color, Tattoo Artists, Board of
- Emergency Board
- Emergency Management Office (Oregon State Police)
- Employment Department
- Employment Relations Board
- Energy, Department of
- Engineering and Land Surveying, State Board of Examiners for
- Environmental Health Registration Board
- Environmental Quality, Department of
- Ethics Commission

== F ==
- Film and Video Office, Oregon
- Finance and Corporate Securities Division (Oregon Department of Consumer and Business Services)
- Fire Marshal, Office of State
- Fish and Wildlife, Oregon Department of
- Forest Resources Institute, Oregon
- Forestry Department, State

== G ==
- Geologist Examiners, State Board of
- Geology and Mineral Industries, Department of
- Government Ethics Commission, Oregon (formerly: Government Standards and Practices Commission)
- Governor, Office of the

== H ==
- Health Authority, Oregon
- Health Licensing Office, Oregon
- Health Services Division (Oregon Department of Human Services)
- Hearing Aids, Advisory Council on
- Hispanic Affairs, Commission on
- Homeland Security, Office of
- Housing and Community Services Department
- Human Services, Department of

== I ==
- Oregon Insurance Division (Oregon Department of Consumer and Business Services)
- Interoperability Executive Council, State
- Invasive Species Council, Oregon
- Investigators, Board of

== J ==
- Judicial Department
- Judicial Fitness and Disability, Commission on
- Justice, Oregon Department of (Oregon Attorney General)
- Judicial Department, Oregon

== L ==
- Labor and Industries, Bureau of (See Oregon Commissioner of Labor and Industries)
- Land Conservation and Development, Department of
- Land Conservation and Development Commission (Oregon Department of Land Conservation and Development)
- Land Use Board of Appeals
- Lands, Department of State
- Landscape Architect Board, State
- Landscape Contractors Board, State
- Legislative Administration Committee
- Legislative Assembly
- Legislative Commission on Indian Services
- Legislative Counsel Committee
- Legislative Fiscal Office
- Legislative Revenue Office
- Lane County Local Government Boundary Commission
- Library, Oregon State
- Liquor Control Commission, Oregon
- Long Term Care Ombudsman, Office of the
- Lottery, Oregon State

== M ==
- Marine Board, Oregon State
- Massage Therapists, Board of
- Medical Board
- Medical Examiner, State
- Midwifery, Board Of Direct Entry
- Medical Insurance Pool, Oregon (Oregon Department of Consumer and Business Services)
- Military Department, Oregon
- Minority, Women and Emerging Small Business Office (Oregon Department of Consumer and Business Services)
- Mortuary and Cemetery Board, State
- Motor Carrier Transportation Division (Oregon Department of Transportation)

== N ==
- National Guard, Oregon
- Naturopathic Examiners, Board of
- Nursing, Oregon State Board of
- Nursing Home Administrators, Board of Examiners of

== O ==
- Occupational Safety and Health Division (Oregon Department of Consumer and Business Services)
- Occupational Therapy Licensing Board
- Optometry, Oregon Board of

== P ==
- Pacific Northwest Electric Power and Conservation Planning Council
- Pacific States Marine Fisheries Commission
- Parks and Recreation Department, State
- Patient Safety Commission
- Parole and Post-Prison Supervision, State Board of
- Performance Reporting Information System
- Pharmacy, State Board of
- Physical Therapist Licensing Board
- Police, Department of State
- Private Health Partnerships, Office of
- Psychiatric Security Review Board
- Psychologist Examiners, State Board of
- Public Defense Services Commission
- Public Employees Benefit Board
- Public Employees Retirement System
- Public Safety Standards and Training, Department of
- Public Utility Commission

== R ==
- Racing Commission, Oregon
- Radiologic Technology, Board of
- Real Estate Agency
- Resource and Technology Development Fund
- Respiratory Therapist Licensing Board
- Revenue, Department of

== S ==
- Salmon and Watersheds, Oregon Plan for
- Secretary of State, Office of the
- Senior Health Insurance Benefits Assistance
- Seniors and People with Disabilities (Oregon Department of Human Services)
- Speech-Language Pathology and Audiology, State Board of Examiners for
- State Fair and Exposition Center, Oregon
- Student Assistance Commission, Oregon
- Supreme Court, Oregon (Oregon Judicial Department)

== T ==
- Tax Court, Oregon (Oregon Judicial Department)
- Tax Practitioners, Board of
- Tax Supervising and Conservation Commission
- Teacher Standards and Practices Commission
- Tourism Commission, Oregon
- Transportation Commission, Oregon
- Transportation, Department of
- Travel Information Council
- Treasury, State (Oregon State Treasurer)

== U ==
- Uniform State Laws, Commission on
- University System, State

== V ==
- Veterans' Affairs, Department of
- Veterinary Medical Examining Board, Oregon State

== W ==
- Water Resources Department
- Watershed Enhancement Board, Oregon
- Wine Board, Oregon
- Women, Commission for
- Workers Compensation Division, Oregon (Oregon Department of Consumer and Business Services)
- Worksource Oregon

== Y ==
- Youth Authority, Oregon

== See also ==
- Government of Oregon
- Oregon Progress Board
- Lists of Oregon-related topics
