= Oregon Public Utility Commission =

Utility regulatory agency for the state of Oregon, USA

Oregon Public Utility Commissions
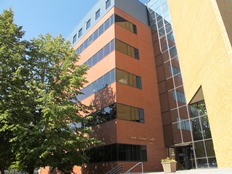

Agency overview
- Headquarters: Salem, Oregon
- Website: www.oregon.gov/PUC

The Oregon Public Utility Commission (PUC) is the chief electric, gas and telephone utility regulatory agency of the government of the U.S. state of Oregon. It sets rates and establishes rules of operation for the state's investor-owned utility companies. With respect to publicly owned utility districts and cooperatives, its authority is limited to safety regulations.

The first regulation of a public utility was effected in 1874 when the Oregon Legislative Assembly passed a law regulating rates and procedures for the gas distribution business of Al Zeiber in Portland. His primary contract was with the city for its gas street lamps. The agency, or its predecessors including the Public Service Commission, have been charged with a wide variety regulatory duties, encompassing industries as diverse as timber rafting to intrastate rail and bus service.

The present commission was reestablished in 1987 as a three-member panel, replacing the office of the Public Utility Commissioner, as a result of voters' passage of a statewide ballot measure in November 1986. The new panel's first three members, all appointed by Governor Neil Goldschmidt, were Charles Davis, who had already been serving as acting Commissioner since January 1987; State Senator Nancy Ryles and Paul G. Cook. Earlier, Davis had also been Oregon's Public Utility Commissioner under Gov. Robert W. Straub, from 1975 to 1979.

A second major change occurred in 1995. State legislative action transferred the responsibility for regulating motor transportation and rail safety to the Oregon Department of Transportation.

== Organization ==
The PUC is organized into several sections. Staff members in the Utility Program represent customers in rate filings by examining utility companies' financial needs. They regularly check utility records to see that they comply with PUC and general accounting standards. They also monitor other programs carried out by regulated utilities, including safety procedures, to ensure that services are safe and reliable.

The Administrative Hearings Division conducts public meetings, public and confidential hearings, and other proceedings on utility matters, including major rate cases. They often hold hearings in outlying areas of the state to offer customers a convenient opportunity to participate

The Economic Research and Financial Analysis Division researches and analyzes issues common to regulated industries.

The Regulatory Operations Division tracks and process all filings, maintains the PUC databases, organizes semi-monthly public meeting agendas, determines utility fee assessments, and coordinates administrative rule action.

The Public Utility Commission regulates rates and services charged customers by the state's investor-owned electric, natural gas, telecommunication, and certain water utilities. The PUC conducts its business via biweekly hearings held in Salem and in public hearings held to addressee's specific issues. The PUC's decisions and regulatory responsibilities are implemented and carried out by staff of PUC's support programs.

Laws that govern the functions of the PUC are contained in the Oregon Revised Statutes, chapters 756–774. The commission has also adopted administrative rules relating to these statutes.
