= OMIP =

OMIP may refer to:

- Oregon Medical Insurance Pool
- Optimized Multicolor Immunofluorescence Panel
