= Oregon Performance Reporting Information System =

Database of workforce system in Oregon, USA

The Performance Reporting and Information System (PRISM) is a data system which collects and disseminates performance measurement data for individuals receiving workforce services from the U.S. state of Oregon government. To help inform decision-making of educators, administrators, and policy makers for program and service delivery, PRISM produces information about the effectiveness of workforce system programs and services. A suite of user-friendly reporting tools provides easy access for anyone who is interested in learning about the results that Oregon's workforce system produces for its customers.

== How PRISM Works ==
Oregon's workforce system delivers a wide variety of services including job placement and training for youth and adults, and employment-related services for targeted populations. The workforce system also serves employers by providing job listings, applicant screening, and labor market information.

In order to measure workforce system performance, PRISM collects and analyzes a wealth of administrative and demographic data from workforce and education partners. Workforce data include Temporary Assistance for Needy Families (TANF), Vocational Rehabilitation, SNAP (Food Stamps), Title I (Youth, Adults, and Dislocated Workers), Employment Services, Unemployment Insurance, and Trade Act (provides assistance to individuals who become totally or partially unemployed due to the impact of international trade). The PRISM Education partners provide a wealth of education and training data for students from kindergarten through higher education. The results of this analysis are published as a set of performance measures that describe how successfully workforce system customers find jobs, keep jobs, and improve their earning power through training and education. PRISM also measures how satisfied customers are with the services they receive.

PRISM works by matching information about customers' workforce program participation against quarterly Unemployment Insurance wage records, data from Oregon's education system, and feedback obtained through customer satisfaction surveys. This information is combined into 12 performance measures that describe customer outcomes and experiences after they have received workforce and education services. Five of these measures relate to customers' employment and earnings; five summarize participant education and skill gain; two gauge customer satisfaction among businesses and individuals.

PRISM was established by the Oregon Legislative Assembly by passage of the 2001 law S.B. 400 (ORS 657.734) which took effect in 2002. The system is governed by a steering committee comprising representative of the three cooperating agencies as mandated by the law, Oregon Employment Department, Oregon Higher Education Coordinating Commission and Oregon Department of Human Services, but remains otherwise independent of the represented agencies.
