= Oregon Department of Education =

State government organization in Oregon (USA)

- Seal of Oregon

Agency overview
- Jurisdiction: State of Oregon
- Headquarters: Salem, OR
- Agency executive: Charlene Williams, Deputy Superintendent of Public Instruction
- Website: www.oregon.gov/ode/pages/default.aspx

The Oregon Department of Education is the department responsible for implementing Oregon's public education policies, including academic standards and testing, credentials, and other matters not reserved to the local districts and boards. The department is overseen by the Governor, acting as State Superintendent of Public Instruction. Agencies of the department include the Chief Education Office (formerly the Oregon Education Investment Board), the Early Learning Division, the Higher Education Coordinating Commission, the State Board of Education, and the Youth Development Division. The key roles of the agency include setting test standards and graduation requirements for statewide uniformity.

The department serves 197 elementary and secondary school districts and 19 education service districts across the state, which in turn serve over 500,000 students.

== History ==
From 1872 to 2012, the Oregon Department of Education was led by an elected constitutional officer, titled the Oregon Superintendent of Public Instruction. However, in 2012, the Oregon legislature eliminated the elected office of Superintendent of Public Instruction and consolidated its functions with the office of Governor. Susan Castillo was the final elected Superintendent of Public Instruction.

Under the current system, the Governor appoints a Deputy Superintendent of Public Instruction to act as day-to-day administrator of the department. The Deputy Superintendent is a professional position, as opposed to an elected position. They carry out the state policies set by the State Board of Education and by the Oregon State Legislature.

== See also ==
- Oregon Performance Reporting Information System
