= Oregon Chief Education Office =

Former state government agency

Chief Education Office
- Agency logo

Agency overview
- Formed: 2014; 12 years ago
- Dissolved: June 30, 2019; 7 years ago
- Superseding agency: Oregon Education Investment Board
- Type: Educational Policy
- Jurisdiction: Public education/degree granting
- Headquarters: 255 Capitol St. NE Salem, OR 97310-1330; 44.9393°N 123.0290°W
- Agency executive: Lindsey Capps, Acting Chief Education Officer
- Child agencies: Oregon Early Learning Division; Oregon Department of Education; Oregon Youth Development Division; Oregon Higher Education Coordinating Commission; Oregon Teachers Standards and Practices Commission
- Website: www.oregon.gov/cedo/
- Location of former headquarters in Salem

The Oregon Chief Education Office was a government agency created by statute (Senate Bill 215 of the 78th Oregon Legislative Assembly) in 2015 by the state of Oregon. Its stated mission was "to build and coordinate a seamless system of education that meets the diverse learning needs of Oregonians from birth through college and career," through the efforts of five subsidiary divisions also created or relocated from elsewhere in the state government's organizational hierarchy to come under its leadership by the same statute:

- Oregon Early Learning Division
- Oregon Department of Education
- Oregon Youth Development Division
- Oregon Higher Education Coordinating Commission
- Oregon Teachers Standards and Practices Commission

The Chief Education Office sunset legislatively on June 30, 2019, with its functions transferring to other state agencies.

== See also ==
- Education in Oregon
