= Oregon State Board of Geologist Examiners =

The Oregon State Board of Geologist Examiners (OSBGE) is an agency of the U.S. state of Oregon. Administrative support for the board is provided by the Oregon Department of Consumer and Business Services.

The mission of the Oregon State Board of Geologist Examiners is to help assure the safety, health, and welfare of Oregonians with regard to the public practice of geology through:

1. Licensing of those engaged in the public practice of geology
2. Response to complaints from the public and members of the profession
3. Public education directed at appropriate regulatory communities
4. Cooperation with closely related Boards and Commissions
5. Attention to ethics
6. Systematic outreach to counties, cities, and registrants

The Governor of Oregon appoints members of the Oregon State Board of Geologist Examiners. The board consists of four geologists and one public member. The Governor may remove any member of the board for misconduct, incompetence, neglect of duty, or any other sufficient cause.

Each member of the board is a citizen of the United States. The member is also required to have been a resident of Oregon for one year preceding appointment. Insofar as possible, the board is composed of members having diverse geological specialties, including at least one engineering geologist.

A member of the board holds office until the expiration of the term for which appointed or until their successor has been appointed. Board members are appointed for a term of three years. No person shall serve as a member of the board for more than two consecutive three-year terms.

The State Geologist is an ex officio member of the board.

Geology registration in Oregon was signed into law on July 21, 1977 by Governor Bob Straub. The signed registration bill (House Bill 2288) became law in October 1977. The registration act included registration of Geologists In Training (GIT), Registered Geologists (RG), and Certified Engineering Geologists (CEG). Grandparenting was initially established for one year in 1978, after that testing of qualified applicants was required.
