= Wayfinding College =

Nonprofit alternative college in Portland, Oregon

- Location: Portland, Oregon, United States; 45°35′26.5″N 122°45′2.4″W
- Website: wayfinding.college

- Location within Oregon

Wayfinding College (formerly Wayfinding Academy) was a two-year, nonprofit alternative college located in Portland, Oregon, United States. Students graduate from the program with an Associates of Arts degree in Self and Society. As of January 2020, 19 students have completed the two-year program. The college is authorized by the Oregon Higher Education Coordinating Commission. It closed in 2022.

== History ==
After 16 years working in the higher education system (including at Concordia University, Providence College, and University of Puget Sound), Michelle Jones decided to create a new kind of college that would focus on helping students connect with “their passions and purpose.” Along with friends and supporters, she launched an Indiegogo campaign that broke the record for the most successful Indiegogo campaign in Oregon history.
