= Oregon Office of University Coordination =

Government agency overseeing universities in Oregon

The Oregon Office of University Coordination is the agency designated by the Oregon Higher Education Coordinating Commission (HECC), established in 2013 under ORS § 352.002, to provide academic and fiscal coordination for seven public universities in Oregon. Beginning 2015–2016, the Office of University Coordination was authorized to process academic program approval through the HECC, make budget recommendations for public universities in Oregon, and allocate funds using a model for student success and completion. Effective July 1, 2014, three universities (University of Oregon, Oregon State University, and Portland State University) broke away from the Oregon University System. Effective July 1, 2015, the remaining four universities (Eastern Oregon University, Oregon Institute of Technology, Southern Oregon University and Western Oregon University) also became independent.

== See also ==
Oregon Higher Education Coordinating Commission
