= California Basic Educational Skills Test =

Standardized test in California, Oregon, and Nevada

The California Basic Educational Skills Test (CBEST) is a standardized test administered in the state of California. It is available as an option in Oregon and Nevada. The test is intended to score basic proficiency in reading, mathematics, and writing. The test is divided into three sections: the reading and math sections each containing 50 multiple-choice questions; and the writing section, consisting of two essay questions. The entire test must be completed in four hours, and test-takers may allocate the time to each section at their discretion. There is no limit to the number of times the test may be taken. Test-takers do not have to pass all three sections in one sitting. A $41 registration fee for paper-based testing ($30 for each of the three sections in the computer-based testing) must be paid each time the test is taken.

== Program overview ==
One of the books designed to help individuals review for the test.

The California Basic Educational Skills Test (CBEST) is a standardized test which can satisfy the basic skills requirement for teacher credentialing in the state of California. The exam is also available as an option in Oregon and Nevada. It was developed by the California Commission on Teacher Credentialing (CTC) to meet the California Education Code (Section 44254), which was amended by the legislature of California on February 1, 1983. This amendment "requires teachers, administrators, and other school practitioners, [to] demonstrate adequate proficiency, in English, of three basic skills: reading, mathematics, and writing." The CBEST is administered by the National Evaluation Series (NES), a division of Pearson VUE, under the direction of the CBEST Program. It does not test an individual’s teaching skills or abilities; it only tests reading skills (critical analysis, evaluation, comprehension, and research skills), mathematics skills (estimation, measurement, computation, and problem-solving, etc.), and writing skills that are considered important for a job in the education field, either at the elementary, secondary, or higher education levels.

The CBEST gives a separate score for each section tested, and a passing score must be obtained in every section to pass the test. Passing the CBEST is one way to satisfy the California Education Code basic skills requirement for obtaining a California teaching credential, required to teach in California public schools.

The CBEST format was implemented by the Oregon Teachers Standards and Practices Commission (TSPC) in July 1984 to assess the basic skills of individuals entering the education field. Six months after, it became a requirement for obtaining a license in Oregon as an educator. At the time it was implemented, it was an additional requirement for obtaining a license or credential, and it did not replace the other requirements established for the issuance of teaching credentials. While the CBEST remains an option in Oregon, as of June 11, 2011, the state legislature approved other methods for meeting the basic skills requirement in that state.

== Test design/sections ==
The CBEST consists of three sections, containing multiple-choice questions and two essay questions. Each multiple-choice question presents five choices (A through E) and examinees are given four hours to take the test. The time given can be divided among the three sections in any way desired.

=== Reading section ===
The reading section contains 50 multiple-choice questions based on original passages of between 100 and 200 words. In some cases, these passages may be short statements of not more than one or two sentences. These questions measure the ability to understand the information given through the written word or in charts and graphs. They emphasize critical analysis, evaluation, comprehension, and research skills.

The critical analysis and evaluation portion is approximately 40 percent of the questions from this section, and the comprehension and research skills portion is approximately 60 percent of the questions from this section.

=== Mathematics sections ===
The mathematics section contains 50 multiple-choice questions that assess cumulative knowledge of the mathematics traditionally taught in elementary and high school and, sometimes, in college. These questions come from three broad categories: arithmetic, algebra, and measurement and geometry. None of the questions strictly tests computation, but computational skills are required throughout the test.

About 40% of the questions on the mathematics section of the CBEST are related to arithmetic. About 20% of the questions are related to elementary geometry and the remaining items are related to other mathematical concepts and skills.

=== Writing sections ===
The writing section contains two essay questions. This portion of the CBEST assesses the ability to compose two effective essays within the given time session. The essays must answer the two topics printed in the test booklet. One topic requires an analysis of a given situation or a particular statement, and the other asks for a narrative about a personal experience. These essays test the ability to compose effective prose and to communicate ideas to an intended audience.

Essay writing demonstrates the ability to think critically and to use language logically and clearly. The 30-minute time limit for each essay allows little time to rewrite or to reflect on the writing. Therefore, the performance on this portion of the test will demonstrate the ability to organize and support ideas quickly.

== Scoring the exam ==
Passing requires a total of 123 points across all three sections, and a score no lower than 37 in any one section.

=== Writing scores ===
Essays are scored by California, Oregon, and Nevada educators, according to standardized procedures during scoring sessions held immediately after each CBEST administration. Writing scores are determined by scoring each of the two essays holistically according to the criteria described in the CBEST Writing Score Scale.

CBEST Writing Score Scale

1. Rhetorical Force
2. Organization
3. Support and Development
4. Usage
5. Structure and conventions
6. Appropriateness

== Computer-based testing ==
CBEST computer-based testing (CBEST CBT) is available "by appointment, year-round, Monday through Saturday (excluding some holidays)." In addition, "[t]est appointments are accepted on a first-come, first-served basis, and seating is limited. The exam is administered at Pearson Professional Centers operated by Pearson VUE. Each site gives a list of the testing windows that are open for registration. Test sites show information about available test centers in California and other centers in the United States.

== California Basic Skills Requirements ==
The CBEST is an option for prospective educators to satisfy the basic skills requirement in the following situations:

1. applying for a teaching or service credential for the first time;
2. employees starting a new job who have not taught during the prior 39 months;
3. applying for admission to either a teacher-preparation or service-credential program approved by the CCTC.

== Before registration ==
=== Test selection ===
Registrants for the paper-based CBEST are automatically registered for all three sections. One, two, or all three sections may be taken at a given paper-based test administration.

Registrants for the computer-based CBEST may register to take one, two, or all three sections. The test fee is the same regardless of selection. Section selection may not be changed after registration; withdrawal and re-registration are required for any section changes.

=== Test dates and sites ===
The CBEST is offered several times a year, at different locations throughout California, Nevada, and Oregon. Specific CBEST test dates can be found at the CBEST website.

A test area choice can be indicated when registering for the CBEST. A specific test site will be given based on the facilities available and appropriate for test administration. Test sites are subject to change due to scheduling conflicts. Although “every attempt will be made to ensure that the new site is located in the same general aree as the one originally requested,” it is recommended to carefully review the test area selections as changes are made. Prospective Registrants can refer to the Pearson VUE website for up-to-date information about all available test centers and emergency registration test areas.

=== Test fees ===
Fees for Internet and telephone registration must be paid using a credit card or a debit or check card. The fees for registration by U.S. mail and for other services requested by mail must be paid by check or money order.

Test Registration Fees
In-person test fee	$41
Computer-based testing fee, per section	$30
Late registration (for paper-based testing only, in addition to the regular test fee)	$18
Emergency registration (for paper-based testing only, in addition to the regular test fee)	$35
Additional Services Fees
Score verification (multiple-choice section of paper-based test)	$20 per test date
Score verification (essay section)	$50 per test date
Additional copy of test results (per copy)	$10

== Registration options ==
There are three different ways to register for the CBEST including internet registration, mail, and telephone registration.

Internet registration is available 24 hours a day, 7 days a week. Internet registration for the paper-based test can be utilized during regular, late, and emergency registration periods. Registration can occur through the official CBEST website," following the instructions listed. Telephone registration is open from 9:00 a.m. to 5:00 p.m. (Pacific Time), Monday through Friday, excluding certain holidays. Registration must be completed by 5:00 p.m. (Pacific Time) on the registration deadline to be eligible for that specific registration period.

Mail registration deadlines are strictly enforced and must be postmarked by the regular registration deadline. Anything postmarked after the deadline may cause delays or cause you to incur additional registration fees. Telephone registration can be utilized during late and emergency registration periods only. Registrants can call (800) 262-5080 or (916) 928-4001 on the given times and dates. Examinees can then confirm their registration by consulting the CBEST website in the state where they registered.

== The day of test ==
=== Reporting to test site ===
The paper-based test session begins at 8:00 a.m. and ends from 12:45 p.m. to 1:15 p.m. Testing times may vary at testing locations outside of California. The computer-based test session varies depending on what was confirmed in the confirmation email.

=== What to bring and test site rules ===
Paper-based test takers are required to bring an admission ticket, sharpened number 2 pencils with erasers, and proper identification. For computer-based testing, only paper identification as described in the “Identification Policy” is required. CBEST test sites do not allow the following on-site: any smoking and the use of tobacco products, visitors, weapons of any kind, cell phones, electronic communication devices, calculators, handwritten or printed materials, packages/totes, food/drink, and unauthorized aids.

=== During and after test ===
"During the test, [examinees] will have four hours to complete the exam to work on any test section;" bathroom breaks are allowed, but this counts toward the four hours allotted. No type of communication is allowed during the test. When the test is completed, the testing materials are collected and test-takers must leave the facility.

== Passing score ==
All three sections of the test must be passed in order to pass the CBEST. Raw scores can range from 1–50, which are then converted to scaled scores ranging from 20–80. The passing scaled score on each section of the test is 41, and a minimum total score of 123 for all three sections must be achieved to pass.

== Obtaining test results ==
Scores are mailed four to six weeks after the test date. For each section, the scores announce whether or not the section was passed, and it suggests areas within each section that one might need to study. The score report also includes the highest score obtained. A passing score on any section of the test does not have to be taken again.
