= Oregon State Board of Higher Education =

State government entity providing leadership for public universities

The Oregon State Board of Higher Education was the statutory governing board for the Oregon University System from 1909 to 2015. The board was composed of eleven members appointed by the Governor of Oregon and confirmed by the Oregon State Senate. Nine members were appointed for four year terms; two members were students and appointed for two year terms.

== History ==
The board was first known as the Oregon State Board of Higher Curricula and maintained that name from 1909 to 1929. In 1929 the Oregon Legislature passed chapter 251, Oregon Laws 1929, that officially unified the state's public universities under the auspices of the newly renamed "Oregon State Board of Higher Education". Part of that law abolished each public school's board of regents and created a nine-member State Board of Higher Education. Becky Johnson, the first person whose appointment to a state Commission was subject to Senate approval, served on the Board from 1962 - 1975.

Former Governor of Oregon Neil Goldschmidt was appointed and selected as the board's president in January 2004, but the Senate confirmation process that approved his appointment also led to revelations of a decades-old sex scandal. Goldschmidt resigned from the board three months after his appointment. Governor Ted Kulongoski took the unusual step of assuming the board presidency following Goldschmidt's resignation.

The most recent addition to the Board was Jim Francesconi, former Portland City Councillor and mayoral candidate. He was confirmed by a vote of 28-1 in February, 2007, with Senator Vicki Walker casting the sole "no" vote, and Senator Rick Metsger absent.

Both the Oregon State Board of Higher Education and the Oregon University System closed permanently on June 30, 2015. Most of the authorizations and programs of those two agencies were assumed by the Oregon Higher Education Coordinating Commission, which was formed in 2011 and expanded by the legislature in 2013 when independent boards were established for Oregon State University, University of Oregon, and Portland State University.

== See also ==
- Oregon Office of Degree Authorization
