= Willamette Lowland basin-fill aquifer =

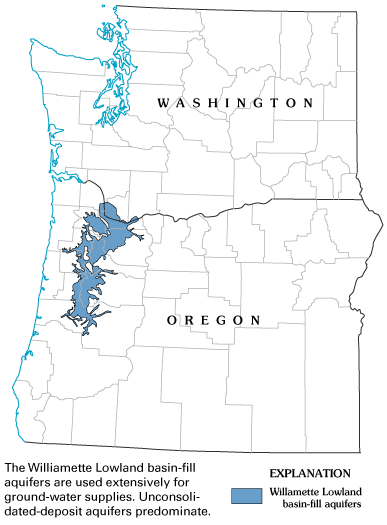
Map showing extent of the Willamette Lowland basin-fill aquifer

The Willamette Lowland basin-fill aquifer is 31,000 km^{2}, 12,000 square mile aquifer underlying the region of Oregon and parts of Washington (state) between the Oregon Coast Range and the Cascade Range. The aquifer shares a name with the local river, the Willamette River, originating from a Clackamas Chinook word. The "mette" of Willamette was used by the Clackamas to mean water or river. The Willamette valley is home to 70% of Oregon's population, with the aquifer supplying water for agricultural, domestic, and industrial purposes. Reported in 2005, the total water use from the aquifer was 1.6 hm^{3} (420 million gallons) per day, with 58% going to irrigation, 24% to public supply, and 18% to industrial use. In general, the aquifer withdraw is sufficiently compensated in the long term by recharge through precipitation, however regions of the aquifer have shown long term declines, including that regions underlain by the Columbia River basalt unit. However, during the dry season from June-September, withdrawals from the aquifer result is significant seasonal variations in the ground water table height, changing by more than 60 ft. In the state of Oregon, all water is publicly owned and maintenance and protection of water is done by the Oregon Water Resources Department and the Oregon Water Resources Commission. However, local governments can provide land use permits for aquifer use, notably, use for new rural residences.

== Hydrogeology ==
The Willamette Lowland basin-fill aquifer is composed of many geologic units that are broadly separated into six hydrogeological categories. These categories are listed from lowest to highest.

The lowest unit is the basement confining unit, composed of tertiary marine sedimentary rocks and Eocene volcanic rocks near the Oregon Coast Range, and volcanic and volcaniclastic rocks near the Cascade Range. This unit has low permeability and low porosity, but still can provide water at a low rate.

Generally, above basement unit is the Columbia River basalt unit, consisting of flood-basalt lavas. In this unit, water is stored in the region between two lava flows, where weather has created porosity in the rock unit. Because of this, water is able to flow horizontally through the unit, but generally has very low vertical permeability.

Above the Columbia River Basalt is the lower sedimentary unit, which also sometimes directly overlays the basement unit. This unit constitutes the bulk of the basin-fill of the Willamette Lowland basin-fill aquifer. The basin-fill sediments are due to erosion from rock formations located above that have filled in the basin below. Local sand and gravel beds can have moderate to high productivity for water. This

Map of the Hydrogeological Units of the Willamette Lowland Aquifer

The middle sedimentary unit overlies the lower sedimentary unit. This unit is generally thinner than the lower sedimentary unit. It consists of mainly sands and gravels from the Pleistocene. This unit along with the lower sedimentary unit have high porosity and high permeability, resulting in high water yields. Agriculture typically uses these units for irrigation.

The uppermost unit is the Willamette silt unit. This unit is composed of fine grained silts. The silt unit covers the lowland, but in some areas it has been washed away by erosion. The high porosity of this unit makes it suitable for storing water, but the low permeability makes it difficult to extract large quantities. Thus, this unit is typically used for domestic water supplies. It was an important source of water for early settlers in the Willamette valley. The Willamette silt act as an impermeable layer to the underlying water storing layers, resulting in the aquifer behaving as a confined aquifer in these regions where it exists.

== Recharge ==
The high precipitation in this region results in large volumes of recharge for the aquifer. In the low land areas, rainfall can exceed 1400mm (55 in) /yr. In the mountainous regions, rainfall can exceed 2500 mm (100 in) /yr. Where the middle, lower sedimentary, and Columbia River basalt units are exposed to the surface, water can seep into the aquifer from above. The Willamette silt unit limits recharge to underlying layers due to its low vertical hydraulic conductivity. Models show recharge in the mountainous regions to exceed 40 in/yr; most of this likely discharges into streams, making it unavailable for groundwater inflow into lowland areas.

Due to the Columbia River basalt unit's low vertical permeability, recharge of this unit, especially deep areas is limited. Pumping from the deep Columbia River unit has impacted areas six miles or more away from the pumping site. This results in long-term declines in this unit that are not typically observed elsewhere in the aquifer system.
