= Lagos State Ministry of Rural Development =

Ministry in Nigeria

Ministry overview
- Jurisdiction: Government of Lagos State
- Headquarters: State Government Secretariat, Alausa, Lagos State, Nigeria
- Ministry executive: Cornelius Ojelabi, Commissioner

The Lagos State Ministry of Rural Development is the state government ministry, charged with the responsibility to plan, devise and implement the state policies on Rural Development.

== See also ==
- Lagos State Ministry of Agriculture and Cooperatives
- Lagos State Executive Council
