= Oregon Blue Book =

Directory and fact book of Oregon

- Cover of the 2023 edition
- Editor: Oregon Secretary of State
- Language: English
- Subject: Oregon history, government
- Genre: Reference
- Published: Biennially, 1911–present
- Publication place: United States
- Media type: Print, online
- Text: Oregon Blue Book online

The Oregon Blue Book is the official directory and fact book for the U.S. state of Oregon prepared by the Oregon Secretary of State and published by the Office of the Secretary's Archives Division.

The Blue Book comes in both print and online editions. The Oregon Revised Statutes require the Secretary of State to publish the print edition "biennially on or about February 15 of the same year as the regular sessions of the Legislative Assembly," which are during odd-numbered years; it has been so published since 1911. The online edition is updated regularly.

== Contents ==
The book contains information on the state, city, county, and federal governments in Oregon, educational institutions, finances, the economy, resources, population figures and demographics.

The 1919 edition contained a "statement of registered motor vehicles, chauffeurs, and dealers from 1905 to 1919", and "a general summary of in the taxable property in Oregon from 1858 to 1918".

== History ==
Secretary of State Ben Olcott published the first edition in 1911 in response to an "increased demand for information of a general character concerning Oregon".

Early editions of the book were available free from the State. By 1937, copies cost 25 cents; in 1981 the book cost $4.

In 1953, a legislative ways and means subcommittee, headed by Representative Francis Ziegler, was going to confer with Secretary of State Earl T. Newbry about how to improve the Blue Book. This was following complaints by Representative Monroe Sweetland that the book was "obsolete, carelessly edited, and only of limited use." Calling the book "an inferior job", Sweetland criticized the timing of book's publication long after elections, as well as the map in the back. As a result, the 1953 Legislative Assembly passed a law requiring the book be published soon after the legislature convenes.

The 1993–94 edition of the book contained a four-page erratum. When Norma Paulus was Secretary of State, she would send a free copy of the book to the first person to find a mistake in each new edition. The 1995–96 edition was reduced in size from its predecessors.

== Reviews ==
A 1995 Register-Guard editorial called the book "indispensable".

== See also ==
- The Oregon Encyclopedia
