= Oregon Office of Community Colleges and Workforce Development =

Oregon government agency overseeing community college standards and funding

Logo

The Oregon Office of Community Colleges and Workforce Development (CCWD), formerly the Oregon Department of Community Colleges and Workforce Development, is an agency of the government of the U.S. state of Oregon which distributes state funds for community colleges and sets standards for those institutions, provides adult basic education and dislocated worker retraining, and manages the Oregon Youth Conservation Corps program. In addition, it administers, on behalf of the Governor of Oregon, the programs of the federal Workforce Investment Act and is responsible for state compliance with its requirements. Its educational role is overseen by the Oregon Higher Education Coordinating Commission.

== See also ==
- Oregon Performance Reporting Information System
