= Oregon Department of Human Services =

Department of the state government of Oregon, U.S.

- ODHS
- ODHS Logo

Agency overview
- Formed: 1971
- Type: State Government, Social Services
- Jurisdiction: U.S. state of Oregon
- Headquarters: Salem
- Employees: 9,800 (approx.)
- Annual budget
- Agency executives: , Director; Fariborz Pakseresht
- Child agencies: Aging and People with Disabilities; Child Welfare; Self Sufficiency Programs; Office of Developmental Disability Services; Vocational Rehabilitation
- Website: Official website

The Oregon Department of Human Services (ODHS) is the principal human services agency of the government of the U.S. state of Oregon. DHS provides services to more than 1 million Oregonians each year.

== History ==
1971: The Oregon Legislature created the Oregon Department of Human Resources, an agency providing a spectrum of human services to individuals, families and communities. Over the years parts of the agency were spun off, becoming the Oregon Department of Corrections, the Oregon Employment Department, the Oregon Youth Authority, and the Oregon Housing and Community Services Department.

2001: The Oregon Legislature reorganized the department and changed its name from the Oregon Department of Human Resources to the Oregon Department of Human Services.

2009: The Oregon Legislature transferred many of the health related functions to the newly created Oregon Health Authority. Today, the Department of Human Services key functions serve children and families, seniors and people with disabilities.

== See also ==
- Oregon Performance Reporting Information System
- Oregon Health Authority
