= Oregon Early Learning Division =

Government agency supporting preschool services

Early Learning Division
Agency overview
- Type: Early Childhood
- Jurisdiction: Public and private preschool and childcare agencies in Oregon
- Headquarters: Salem, Oregon
- Annual budget: $218.5 million USD (2018)
- Agency executive: Miriam Calderon, Acting Early Learning System Director
- Website: oregonearlylearning.com

The Oregon Early Learning Division, under the authority of the Oregon Department of Education, supports preschool services in the U.S. state of Oregon. The division has three primary objectives:

- ensuring that students are prepared to succeed in Kindergarten
- promoting stable families
- coordinating effective support for families with preschool-aged children

The work of the division is overseen by a 19-member Early Learning Council and the Oregon Chief Education Office. The first director of the Division was Jada Rupley, who served from 2013 until her retirement in August 2014. Governor Kitzhaber appointed Megan Irwin as Rupley's successor in 2015. Miriam Calderon has served as the Early Learning System Director since 2017.
