= Oregon State Board of Education =

Government agency overseeing K-12 public schools in Oregon

Agency overview
- Agency executives: Kate Brown, Governor of the State of Oregon, and Superintendent of Public Instruction; Colt Gill, Interim Deputy Superintendent of Public Instruction
- Parent agency: Oregon Department of Education
- Website: Oregon State Board of Education

The Oregon State Board of Education sets standards and policies for public schools, from kindergarten through grade twelve, in the U.S. state of Oregon. The State Board of Education was established first in 1872. As defined by the Oregon legislature in 1951, the Board has seven members who are appointed by the Governor and approved by the Senate. The Board exercises oversight over 197 public school districts and 20 educational service districts.

== History ==
In 1859, Oregon's state constitution created a school system and designated the Governor as Superintendent of Public Instruction. By 1872, the legislature established the State Board of Education, which was to consist of the Governor, Secretary of State, and an elected Superintendent of Public Instruction. The Board had authorization to approve textbooks, approve rules for schools, grant diplomas and teacher certifications, and revoke diplomas and certificates on grounds of immorality or non-professionalism.

Board membership and responsibilities remained essentially the same until 1941, with additional boards and commissions added to report to the State Board of Education, such as the state Board of Textbook Commissioners in 1899; the State Board for Vocational Education in 1919; and the Commission on Americanization to focus on immigrants in 1925. In 1932, a separate Board of Higher Education was established to manage the seven 4-year state colleges and universities, and by 1941, the State Board for Vocational Education had become a division of the State Board of Education.

In 1951 Oregon's Legislative Assembly removed the Governor and Secretary of State from the Board, and restructured it to have seven elected members.
