= Oregon Administrative Rules =

State administrative code

Oregon Administrative Rules Compilation (OAR) is the official compilation of rules and regulations, having the force of law in the U.S. state of Oregon. It is the regulatory and administrative corollary to Oregon Revised Statutes, and is published pursuant to ORS 183.360(3). It is compiled and issued annually by the Administrative Rules Unit of the Secretary of State's Archives Division, with monthly updates issued as the Oregon Bulletin, the latter also providing notice of intended rule action, Executive Orders of the Governor, Opinions of the Attorney General, and orders issued by the Director of the Department of Revenue.

A rule is defined by the Oregon Revised Statutes as "any agency directive, standard, regulation or statement of general applicability that implements, interprets or prescribes law or policy, or describes the procedure or practice requirements of any agency".

In 1957, the Oregon Legislative Assembly directed that all agencies should compile and publish rules to be known as Oregon Administrative Rules by filing rules with the Secretary of State and notifying the Secretary when rules changed. The Secretary of State was required to publish the compilations at least every two years. These compilations of Oregon Administrative Rules expanded over the years, the 1957–1963 editions were published in two loose leaf volumes, the 2009 edition comprises 18 volumes. The Oregon Administrative Rules is organized by chapters, with each chapter representing a government agency (Chapter 110 for example is the Capitol Planning Commission).

The Office of the Legislative Counsel reviews administrative rules with regard to constitutionality and scope and intent of enabling legislation.
