= Lagos State Ministry of Agriculture and Cooperatives =

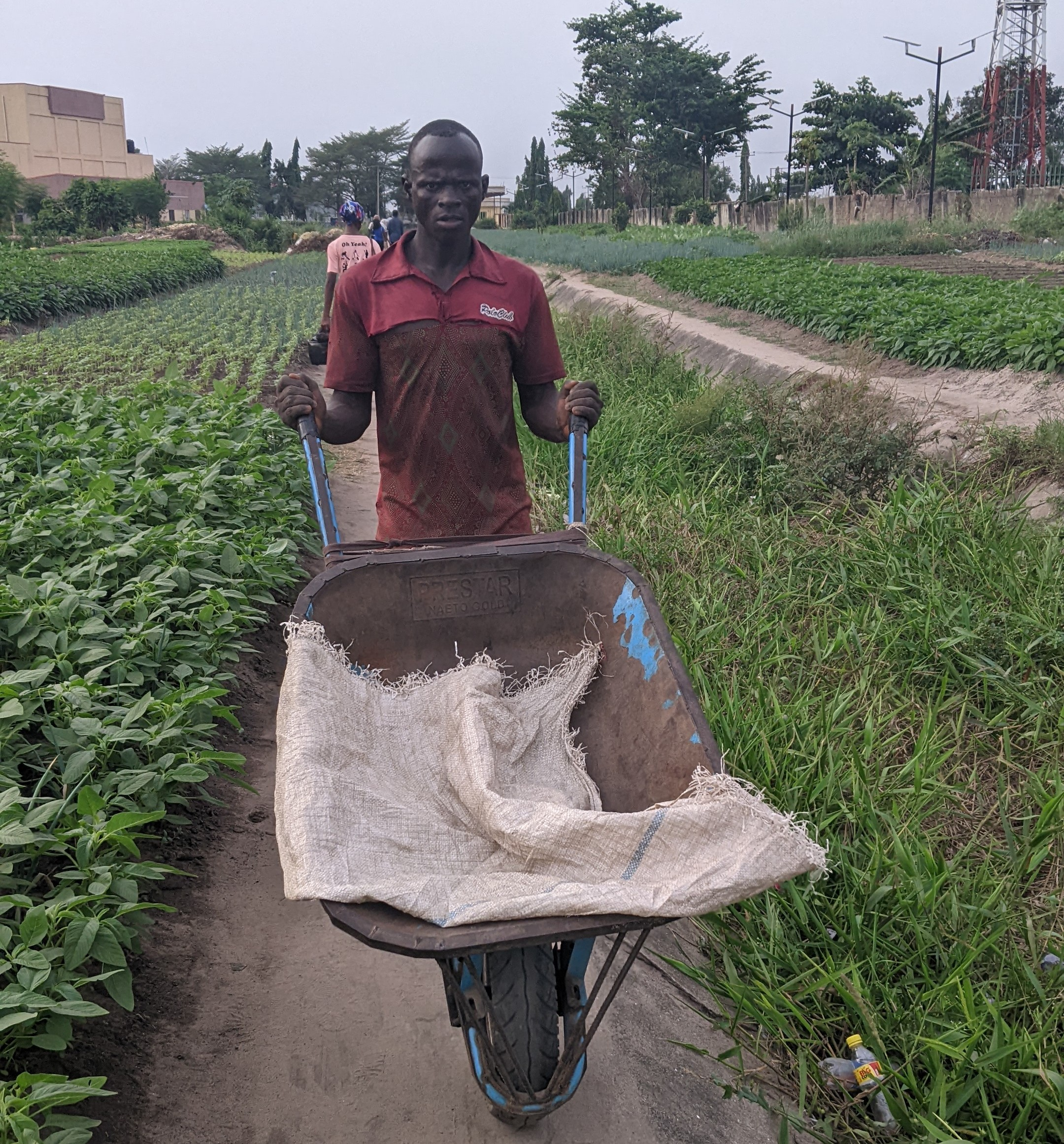
An Hausa Farmer in the Lagos State University

The Lagos State Ministry of Agriculture and Cooperatives is the state government ministry, charged with the responsibility to plan, devise and implement the state policies on Agriculture and Cooperatives.

== History ==
Since the state was founded in 1967, the agricultural sector in the state has evolved throughout several decades. At the time of the Lagos State Ministry of Agriculture's creation, the policy focus was on direct production by the state. For a variety of reasons, the legislative focus has shifted over time from direct production to creating a favorable climate for private sector investment. To manage certain sections of the Sector, a number of specialized agencies were established. The Lagos State Coconut Development Authority (LASCODA), the Agricultural Land Holding Authority (ALHA), the Lagos State Input Supply Authority (LAISA), and the Lagos State Agricultural Development Authority are among these organizations (LSADA).

== Lagos State Coconut Development Authority ==
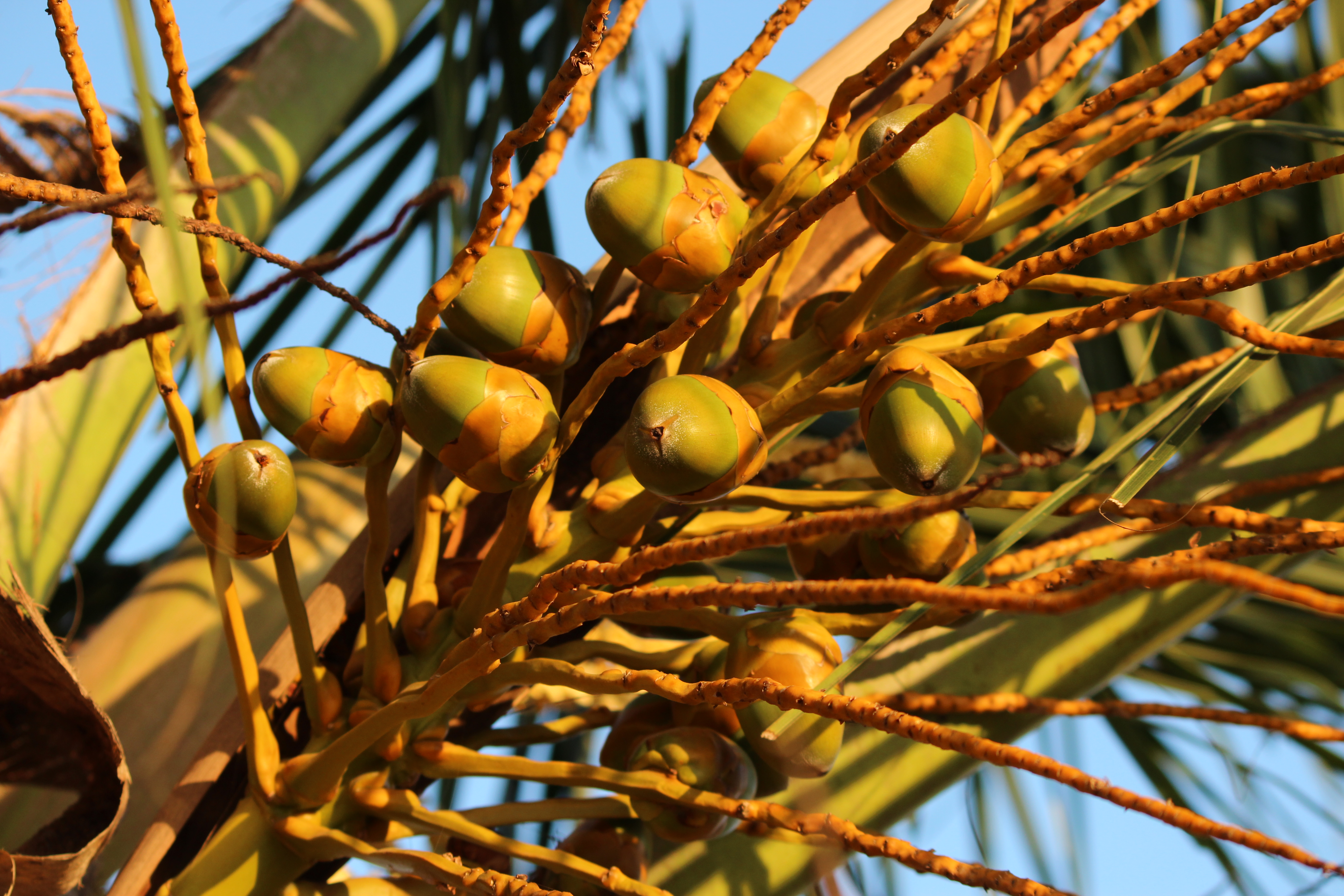

Lagos State Coconut Development Authority (LASCODA) is a parastatal under the Lagos state Ministry of Agriculture. The authority was established on 15 May 1996. The mandate of the agency is to promote sustainable Coconut Production in the state. Coconut is the main cash crop of Lagos State, hence the need of LASCODA to maximize its comparative advantage for production, processing and utilization.

== Activities of LASCODA ==
- The Lagos State Government through LASCODA donated 300 coconut seedlings to the Faculty of Agriculture, Obafemi Awolowo University, Ile-Ife, Osun State, for the establishment of a coconut plantation.
- The Lagos State Government through LASCODA conducted training more than 450 young entrepreneurs on the use of coconut waste in arts and craft.
- The Ministry of Agriculture state through LASCODA engaged 10 bakeries to ensure the mass production of coconut bread in the state.
- The State Government and the Food and Agriculture Organisation (FAO) signed a $200,000 Unilateral Trust Fund Agreement for the development of the coconut value chain
- In Lagos State, Nigeria, the Lagos State Ministry offers sustainable food production.

== Impact ==
With a population growth rate of 3.2 percent per year, Lagos State now produces less than 20% (on average) of the food consumed inside its borders. Food from other States of the Federation and foreign countries is generally used to fill obvious supply deficits. Along the value chains, the state currently has over 600,000 farming families (producers, processors, marketers and service providers).

The Rouleaux Foundation, a scientific non-profit organization, partnered with the Lagos State Government to train and empower food handlers and other stakeholders in Lagos markets on food safety and maintenance, as well as pest and rodent control on a regular basis.

The Lagos State Agricultural Development Authority has urged residents to explore urban farming as a means of achieving food security. Ms Abisola Olusanya, the Commissioner of Agriculture, stated that urban farming would enhance food output, increase access to fresh agricultural products, lessen market pressure on food produce, and stabilize food prices. To improve food security, the government has trained youths and farmers. Promoting rural livelihoods in the state through cooperative societies.

== See also ==
- State Executive Council
- Lagos State Ministry of Housing
