= Nancy Ryles =

American politician

Nancy A. Ryles
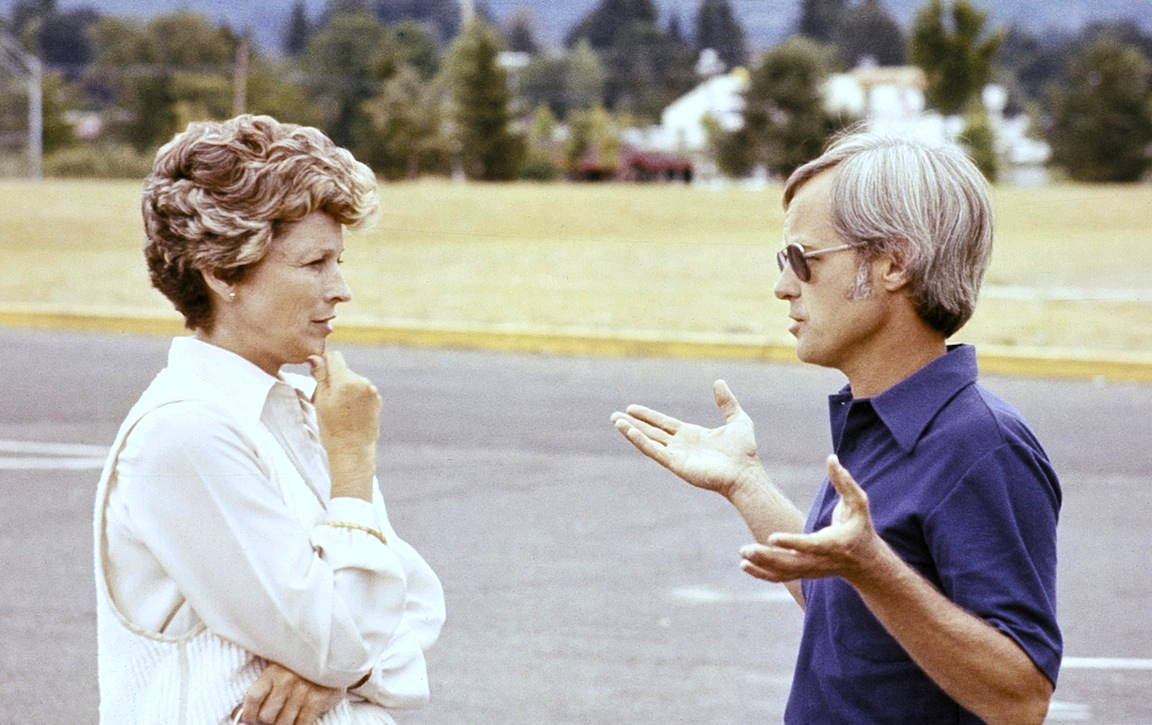
- Nancy Ryles talking with Tom Marsh in 1979

Member of the Oregon House of Representatives, then District 5
- In office 1979–1982
- Preceded by: Tom Marsh
- Succeeded by: Ted Calouri, now District 7
- Constituency: Washington County

Oregon State Senator, District 3
- In office 1983–1987
- Preceded by: none (newly created district)
- Succeeded by: Bill Bloom
- Constituency: Washington County

Member of the Oregon Public Utility Commission
- In office 1987–1990

Personal details
- Born: Nancy Ann Wyly; December 18, 1937 Portland, Oregon
- Died: September 12, 1990 (aged 52)
- Party: Republican
- Spouse: Vern Ryles (1957–1990)
- Children: 2

Nancy Ann Ryles (December 18, 1937 – September 12, 1990) was an American politician. She served in the Oregon House of Representatives, the Oregon Senate and as one of three members of the state's Public Utility Commission. She was known as an advocate for education and for equality for women and minorities. An elementary school in Beaverton is named after her.

== Early life and first public service ==
Nancy Ryles was born Nancy Ann Wyly in 1937 in Portland, Oregon. She graduated from Jefferson High in Northeast Portland and was chosen as Portland Rose Festival Queen in 1955. In 1957, she married Vernon B. Ryles Jr. (1937–2013) and became Nancy Ryles. She attended Willamette University and Portland State University, but did not graduate from college.

Nancy Ryles served on the Beaverton school board from 1972 to 1978, as well as on the State Advisory Council for Career and Vocational Education. The Oregon Education Association gave her its Human Rights Award in 1974. She was named Beaverton's "First Citizen" in 1979.

== Career in government ==
Ryles was elected to the Oregon House of Representatives in 1978, succeeding Tom Marsh, and serving what was then House District 5 (but which became District 7 after a legislative reapportionment plan approved by the Oregon Legislature in 1981). In 1982, she was elected to the Oregon State Senate, District 3—a newly created district formed from portions of other districts (including about half of former Senate District 5). She served two terms in each chamber of the Oregon Legislature, and in both chambers was appointed to serve on the Education Commission of the States.

She was proud of the passage of a 1981 bill mandating public kindergartens in Oregon, which built on work begun by then-legislator Betty Roberts in 1965. She co-chaired a Senate Task Force in 1985 and 1986 which attempted to pass aid in dying legislation; the legislative efforts were unsuccessful, but were an important precursor to the passage of the Oregon Death with Dignity Act in 1994.

She was appointed to the Oregon Public Utility Commission (PUC) by Governor Neil Goldschmidt in April 1987 and resigned her position in the Oregon Senate effective May 15, 1987, to take up her new duties. She was the first woman to serve on the Oregon PUC.

Ryles died September 12, 1990, of cancer. She was still serving on the state's Public Utility Commission at the time, her term due to end on March 31, 1991. She was buried at Bethany Presbyterian Cemetery. She was survived by Vernon Barton Ryles (September 25, 1937 – August 7, 2013) and two children, Scott Allen Ryles and Ashley Marie Ryles.

Friends of Ryles established a women's scholarship program at Portland State University in her honor, the Nancy Ryles Scholarship Fund. The program had been Ryles' own idea. She had regretted having never graduated from college, and she wanted to help other women avoid having such regrets. The first scholarship winner was announced in May 1991, and by September 2010, 23 women had been its beneficiaries. The scholarship fund was valued at $708,000 in 2010.

In 1992, a newly opened elementary school in the Beaverton School District was given the name, Nancy Ryles Elementary School, in tribute to Ryles.
