= Oregon Business Development Department =

Oregon Business Development Department (OBDD) dba Business Oregon
- Company type: State Government Agency
- Headquarters: Salem, Oregon
- Divisions: Director's Office; Infrastructure Finance Authority; DivisionBusiness Innovation and Trade Development Division; Policy & Planning; Oregon Arts Commission

The Oregon Business Development Department (OBDD) dba Business Oregon is a government agency of the U.S. state of Oregon, providing support of economic and community development and cultural enhancement through administration of a variety of programs of incentives, financial support, and technical assistance to businesses, nonprofit organizations and community groups, industries, and local and regional governments and districts.

It is governed by a seven-member commission, appointed by the governor, which guides department policies and strategies to implement its mission: to create, retain, expand and attract businesses that provide sustainable, living wage jobs for Oregonians through public-private partnerships, leveraged funding and support of economic opportunities for Oregon companies and entrepreneurs.

In addition, the Oregon Arts Commission receives administrative support from the agency, and the semi-privatized Oregon Film and Video Office receives direct monetary support.

Its headquarters is in Salem, Oregon and it maintains twelve regional offices in locations throughout the state.
