= Kelvin Hall School =

School in Kingston upon Hull, East Riding of Yorkshire, England

Coordinates: 53°45′52.9″N 0°23′12.1″W

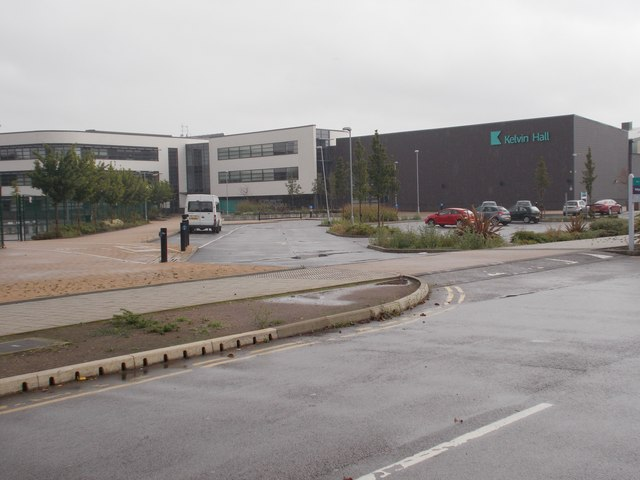
- Hall of Kelvin Hall School UK

Location
- Bricknell Avenue; Kingston upon Hull, East Riding of Yorkshire, HU5 4QH; England

Information
- Type: Academy
- Motto: Where hardworking, respectful and independent young people thrive in and beyond our community.
- Established: 1959
- Local authority: Hull City Council
- Trust: Thrive Co-operative Learning Trust
- Department for Education URN: 143221 Tables
- Ofsted: Reports
- Chair of local governing body: Julie Lynch
- Headteacher: James Shaw
- Staff: 188 (updated 2021)
- Gender: Co-educational
- Age: 11 to 16
- Enrolment: as of September 2022: 1,543
- Capacity: 1,500
- Colour: Teal
- Website: https://kelvinhall.net/

Kelvin Hall School is a co-educational secondary school located in Kingston upon Hull in the East Riding of Yorkshire, England.

== History ==
It opened as Kelvin Hall, Bricknell High School in 1959, and was a technical school. Kelvin Hall was operated separately to Wyke Hall (now Wyke College) and Bricknell High School, which were located on the same campus and was a secondary modern school. Kelvin Hall later took over the whole campus and became a comprehensive school. The school relocated to new buildings on the same site in 2012.

It was previously a foundation school administered by Hull City Council and the West Hull Co-operative Learning Trust.

A new trust named Yorkshire and the Humber Co-operative Learning Trust (YHCLT) was formed on 14 September 2016, and sponsored Kelvin along with multiple other schools, taking the place of the West Hull Co-operative Learning Trust.

In November 2016, Kelvin Hall School converted to academy status, and the trust was renamed to Thrive Co-operative Learning Trust on 12 August 2021.

== Academics ==
Kelvin Hall School offers GCSEs and BTECs as programmes of study for pupils.

== Notable former pupils ==
- Nick Barmby, footballer and manager
- Sonny Bradley, footballer
- Roland Gift, actor and lead singer of the group Fine Young Cannibals
- Colin Thorne, Chair of Physical Geography at the University of Nottingham
- Adrian Oxaal, guitarist with James and Oysterband
