= Colin Thorne =

English academic

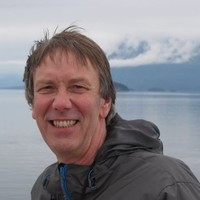
- Born: September 1952 (age 74)
- Education: University of East Anglia
- Awards: Back Award (2016)
- Scientific career
- Workplaces: University of Nottingham; Queen Mary University of London; Colorado State University
- Thesis: Processes of Bank Erosion in River Channels (1978)
- Doctoral advisor: Richard Hey

Colin Reginald Thorne (born September 1952) is Chair of Physical Geography at the University of Nottingham. A fluvial geomorphologist with an educational background in environmental sciences, civil engineering and physical geography; he has published 9 books and over 120 journal papers and book chapters.

He was educated at Kelvin Hall School and the University of East Anglia (BSc; PhD, 1978). He was awarded the Collingwood Prize by The American Society of Civil Engineers in 1986 and the Back Award of the Royal Geographical Society in 2016.

Colin has been heavily involved in governmental policy including leading the geomorphology work package in the UK's Foresight flood and coastal defence project. He has also sat on the government's SAGE advisory group after the UK Floods. Professor Colin Thorne's research has also had public impact in the Costa Rica vs. Nicaragua International Court of Justice case, where Colin acted as an expert witness.

During a career spanning four decades, he has held academic posts at UEA, Colorado State University, the USDA National Sedimentation Laboratory, USACE Waterways Experiment Station, NOAA Fisheries, and the University of Nottingham. He is also a Concurrent Professor at Nanjing University and an Affiliate Professor at Colorado State University.

== Blue-Green Cities Research Project (2013-2016) ==
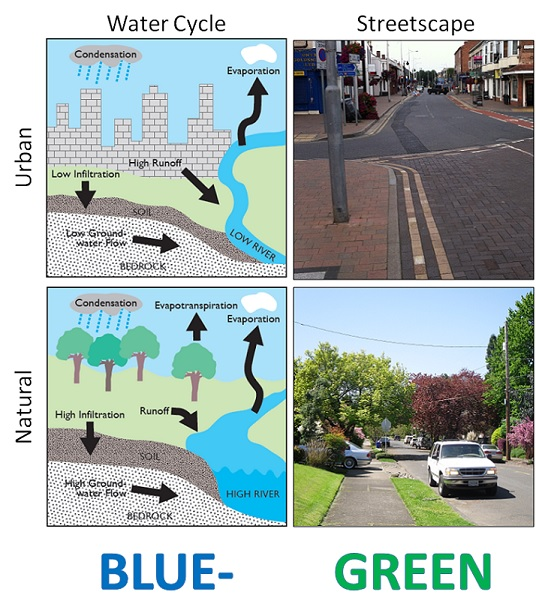
Comparison of hydrologic (water cycle) and environmental (streetscape) attributes in conventional (upper) and Blue-Green Cities

Thorne led the Blue-Green Cities research project (2013-2016), funded by the Engineering and Physical Sciences Research Council (EPSRC), that aimed to deliver and evaluate the multiple flood risk benefits in Blue-Green Cities. Led by Thorne, the Research Consortium included 8 UK universities: the University of Nottingham, the University of Leeds, the University of Cambridge, Heriot-Watt University, Newcastle University, the University of the West of England, Cranfield University and the London School of Economics as well as partners in the US and China. In June 2013 the Research Consortium selected Newcastle upon Tyne as a Demonstration City partly in response to the June 'Toon Monsoon' in 2012.

A Blue-Green City aims to reconfigure the urban water cycle to resemble a naturally-oriented water cycle while contributing to the amenity of the city by bringing water management and green infrastructure together. This is achieved by combining and protecting the hydrological and ecological values of the urban landscape while providing resilient and adaptive measures to address future changes in climate, land use, water management, and socio-economic activity in the city.

A Blue-Green City is more than the blue and green infrastructure that it comprises; it is a holistic concept that requires collaboration between government, industry and public stakeholders and partnerships working to be fully implemented. Blue-Green Cities generate a multitude of environmental, ecological, socio-cultural and economic benefits through integrated planning and management and may be key to future resilience and sustainability of urban environments and processes. In addition to making the urban environment more resilient to flood and drought events, a Blue-Green City is designed to maximise the use of water as a resource, e.g. through rainwater harvesting, irrigation of river channels, groundwater recharge and as a local amenity. Water is preferentially attenuated and stored on the surface to maximise the potential environmental and social benefits, and reduce stress on the subsurface piped sewer system. A Blue-Green City also aims to collect and store water during flood events for later use in times of drought.

=== Background on the study ===
Blue-Green Cities aim to reintroduce the natural water cycle into urban environments and provide effective measures to manage fluvial (river), coastal, and pluvial (urban runoff or surface water) flooding while championing the concept of multi-functional green space and land use to generate multiple benefits for the environment, society, and the economy.

Visible water in cities has massively declined in the last century and many areas are facing future water scarcity in response to changes in climate, land use and population. The concept of Blue-Green Cities involves working with green and blue infrastructure components to secure a sustainable future and generate multiple benefits for the environmental, ecological, social and cultural spheres. This requires a coordinated approach to water resource and green space management from institutional organisations, industry, academia and local communities and neighbourhoods.

The natural water cycle is characterised by high evaporation, a high rate of infiltration, and low surface runoff. This typically occurs in rural areas with abundant permeable surfaces (soils, green space), trees and vegetation, and natural meandering water courses. In contrast, in most urban environments there is more surface runoff, less infiltration and less evaporation. Green and blue spaces are often disconnected. Meaning for a city to be Blue-Green, it requires a further step beyond the implementation of blue and green infrastructure. The lack of infiltration in urban environments may reduce the amount of groundwater, which can have significant implications in some cities that experience drought. In urban environments water is quickly transported over the impermeable concrete, spending little time on the surface before being redirected underground into a network of pipes and sewers. However, these conventional systems ('grey' infrastructure) may not be sustainable, particularly in light of potential future climate change. They may be highly expensive and lack many of the multiple benefits associated with Blue-Green infrastructure.

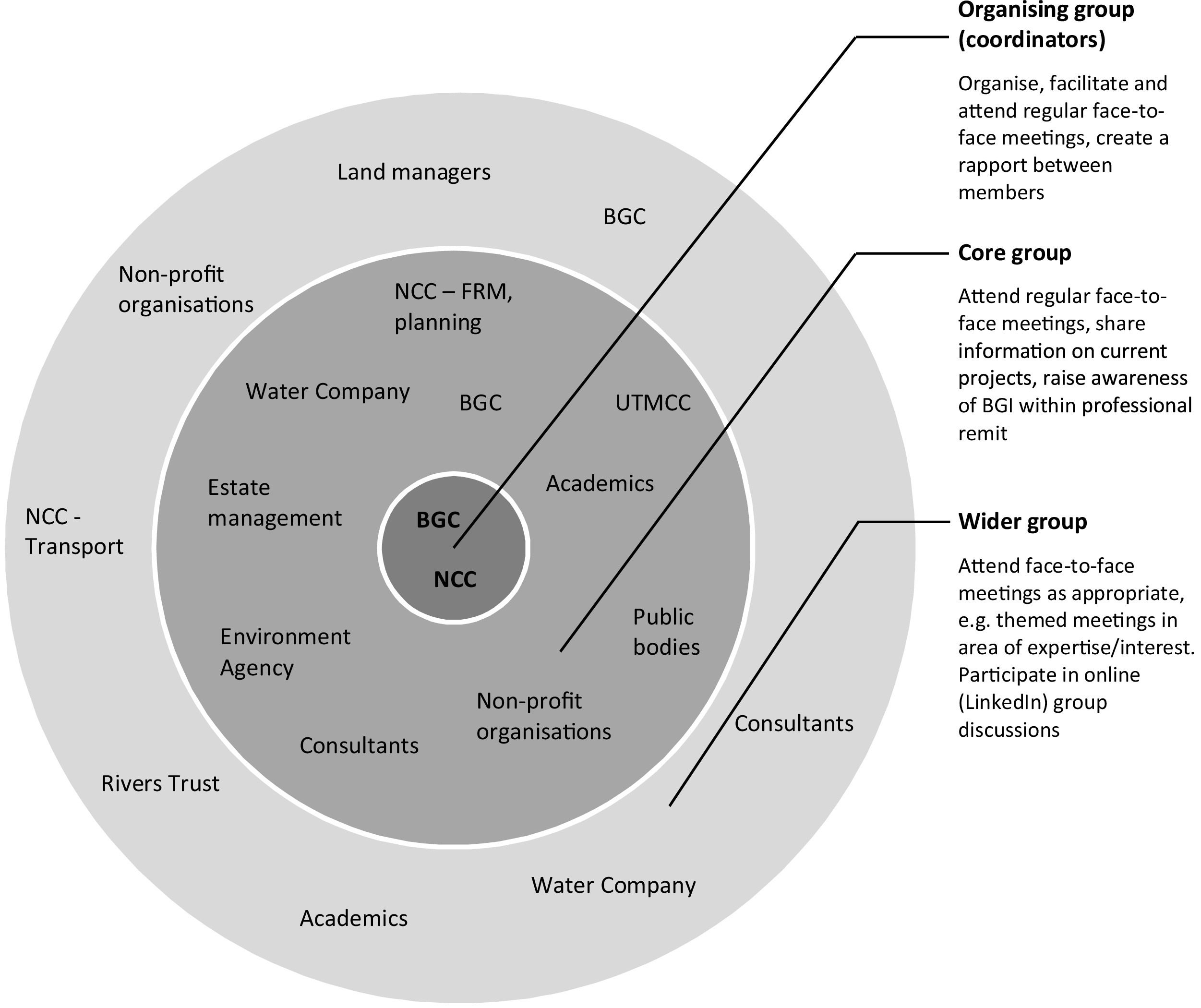
Newcastle Blue-Green Cities Learning and Action Alliance members. Displaying the variety of stakeholders consulted in a Blue-Green city project. From open access journal article: https://doi.org/10.1016/j.envsci.2017.10.013

Land planning and engineering design approaches in Blue-Green Cities aim to be cost effective, resilient, adaptable, and help mitigate against future climate change, while minimising environmental degradation and improving aesthetic and recreational appeal. Key functions in Blue-Green Cities include protecting natural systems and restoring natural drainage channels, mimicking pre-development hydrology, reducing imperviousness, and increasing infiltration, surface storage and the use of water retentive plants. A key factor is interlinking the blue and green assets to create Blue-Green corridors through the urban environment.

Blue-Green Cities favor the holistic approach and aim for interdisciplinary cooperation in water management, urban design, and landscape planning. Community understanding, interaction and involvement in the evolution of Blue- Green design are actively promoted(e.g. Newcastle's LAA). Blue-Green Cities typically incorporate sustainable urban drainage systems (SUDS), a term used in the United Kingdom, known as water-sensitive urban design (WSUD) in Australia, and low impact development or best management practice (BMP) in the United States. Green infrastructure is also a term that is used to define many of the infrastructure components for flood risk management in Blue-Green Cities.

Water management components in Blue-Green Cities are part of a wider complex "system of systems" providing vital services for urban communities. The urban water system interacts with other essential infrastructure such as information and telecommunications, energy, transport, health and emergency services. Blue-Green Cities aim to minimize the negative impacts on these systems during times of extreme flood while maximizing the positive interactions when the system is in the non-flood state. Key barriers to effective implementation of Blue-Green infrastructure can arise if planning processes and wider urban system design and urban renewal programs are not fully integrated.

=== Components of a Blue-Green City ===
A Blue-Green City actively works with existing grey infrastructure to provide optimal management of the urban water system during a range of flood events; from no flood, to minimal flooding, to extreme rainfall events where the drainage system may be exceeded. Due to these holistic and practical ideals, many infrastructure components and common practices may be employed when planning and developing a Blue-Green City, in line with specific local objectives, e.g. water management, delivery of multi-functional green infrastructure, biodiversity action plans.

The key functions of Blue-Green infrastructure components include water use/reuse, water treatment, detention and infiltration, conveyance, evapotranspiration, local amenity provision, and generation of a range of viable habitats for local ecosystems. In most cases, the components are multi-functional.

Blue-Green infrastructure includes:

- Bioretention systems
- Bioretention swales
- Swales and buffer strips
- Storage ponds, lakes and reservoirs
- Controlled storage areas, e.g. car parks, recreational areas, minor roads, playing fields, parkland and hard standing in school playgrounds and industrial areas
- Green roofs
- Sand filters and infiltration trenches
- Permeable paving
- Rain gardens
- Stream and river restoration
- De-canalisation of river corridors and re-introduction of meanders
- Constructed wetlands
- Property level strategies to reduce surface water and manage runoff, such as water butts (or rainwater tanks in the US),
- Open green space
- Parks and gardens
- Street trees
- Pocket parks
- Vegetated ephemeral waterways
- Planted drainage

=== Benefits of a Blue-Green city ===
A Blue-Green City contains an interconnected network of blue and green infrastructure that work in harmony to generate a range of benefits when the system is in both the flood state and non-flood state. As a concept, Blue-Green Cities accept the need for grey infrastructure in certain scenarios to maximise the benefits accrued. A wide range of environmental, ecological, economic and socio-cultural benefits are directly and indirectly attributed to Blue-Green Cities. Many benefits are realised during times of no flood (green benefits), giving Blue-Green Cities a competitive edge over otherwise comparable, conventional cities. Multi-functional infrastructure is a key to generating the maximum benefits when the system is in the non-flood state. An ecosystem services approach is frequently used to determine the benefits people obtain from the environment and ecosystems. Many of the good and services provided by Blue-Green Cities have economic value, e.g. the production of clean air, water and carbon sequestration.

The benefits include;

- Climate change adaptation and mitigation
- Reduction of the urban heat island effect
- Better management of stormwater and water supply, conservation of water resources through efficiency (increasing the resilience to drought)
- Carbon reduction/mitigation
- Improved air quality
- Increased biodiversity (including the reintroduction and propagation of native species)
- Habitat and biodiversity enhancement
- Water pollution control
- Public amenity (recreational water use, parks and recreation grounds, leisure)
- Cultural services (physical and mental health, well-being of citizens, aesthetics, spiritual)
- Community engagement
- Education
- Landscaping and quality of place
- Increased land and property values
- Labor productivity (stress reduction, attracting and retaining staff)
- Economic growth and investment
- Food production
- Healthy soils and a reduction in soil erosion and river bank retreat
- Tourism
- Reduction in the accumulation of sediment, debris and pollutants in Urban watercourses
- Shading and shelter around rivers and the wider urban environment
- Economic benefits related to avoided costs from flooding
- Community cohesion and greater understanding of sustainable planning and lifestyle
- Possible diversification of the local economy and job creation
- Strengthening ecosystem resilience
- Ecological corridors and landscape permeability (biodiversity benefits)
- Avoided impacts of flood events, including avoided damage to the economy, wildlife, buildings and infrastructure, and avoided trauma and distress (mental health impacts) associated with flooding

The multiple benefits of adopting Blue-Green infrastructure will span both the local/regional and global/international scales. The Department of Environment, Farming and Rural Affairs' (DEFRA) approach to flood and coastal risk management has been to seek multi-functional benefits from Flood and Coastal Erosion Risk Management (FCERM) interventions and enhance the clarity of social and environmental consequences in the decision making process. DEFRA note, however, that flood risk reduction benefits provided by ecosystems are not well understood and this is an area where more systematic research is needed such as the SWITCH project.

Work Package 4 of the Blue Green Cities Project involved the creation of a multiple benefit analysis GIS tool box which complements BeST SuDS management tools. The package normalizes different Blue-Green benefits so that different scales of benefit can be analysed together thus allowing a quantification of all the potential benefits of new infrastructure.

=== Blue-Green cities case studies ===
Concepts of water sensitive cities, such as Blue-Green cities, and tools for water-centric urban design are developing in many countries. For developed cities this may be a case of small changes and building back better with progressive redevelopment. For developing cities the process may be much quicker and circumvent the outdated sewage systems in older cities. Few, if any UK cities have progressed beyond "the drained city" stage, with water managed for a series of single functions (including flood risk management), mostly through distribution, collection and treatment systems and drainage infrastructure that are energy intensive and which continue to degrade urban environments in general and urban watercourses, in particular. International case studies and the Newcastle demonstration city show the potential of blue green cities in a variety of contexts. The research consortium led by Colin intends to lead a shift in urban developments to reach the potential shown in these case studies.

==== Newcastle upon Tyne Demonstration City ====
Newcastle was chosen as a demonstration city for the Blue-Green cities Project due to links with Newcastle University and its Estates, the 2012 flood events and the vulnerability of the city center to further flash floods. A high percentage of the city center is impermeable and often unable to cope with high volumes of rain over short periods. A combination of the surface water management plan and community led Learning and Action Alliance was used to select detailed areas to study. These were the middle Ouseburn, Newcastle Great Park and the urban core and adjoining residential area of Wingrove.

SuDS were shown to positively reduce flooding in the Newcastle Great park housing estate and the CityCat flood simulations can be viewed. SuDS were also shown to retain as much as 54% of the suspended sediment that is transported into the ponds, instead of pushing it downstream into the Ouseburn. On top of the ecosystem services benefit to carbon sequestration and habitat size, and reduce air pollution, noise and flood risk the Blue-Green city concept was shown to have successfully created resident approval. 90% of residents' surveyed (299 total responses) like the SuDS ponds and 61% understand the role of the ponds in reducing flood risk.

Multi-benefit analysis was carried out for Wingrove and Newcastle's urban core using the Multiple benefit tool box created by the research consortium. Evaluation showed that potentially Blue-Green infrastructure in Wingrove would reduce noise and air pollution, increase carbon sequestration and habitat size, and improve access to greenspace for residents. This increase in green space could create a network of blue-green space throughout the city. Showing that despite the impressive improvements already made, there are further potential gains from implementing the Blue-Green city concept in Newcastle.

==== Portland, USA ====
The Consortium studied the development of the city Portland, to question whether it fit the Blue-Green city concept. It was decided that Portland has advanced into a world-leading Blue Green city through the 'Grey to Green' initiative at the turn of the century. This led to a sustainable storm water plan which incorporated Green roofs, tree planting and Green streets. Monitoring reports commissioned suggest that eco-roofs have halved discharge into sewage/stormwater drains. This project was combined with new grey infrastructure in the form of the "Big pipe" project to complement Blue Green infrastructure and ensure it is not overwhelmed by larger events making the city more sustainable in the long run.

On top of the Blue-Green infrastructure, a cultural shift has been integral to Portland's classification as a Blue Green city. This cultural shift is visible in the community led approach to sustainable development and water planning, such as the Foster Green Ecodistrict. To solidify these shifts requires normalization of Blue-Green techniques being used by design companies, such as Greenworks who carried out the Johnson Creek Oxbow restoration carried out in metropolitan Portland.

==== Rotterdam, Netherlands ====
Rotterdam is an example of where the Blue-Green cities process has been initiated with the goal of climate proofing a city. There has been a repositioning to use water as an opportunity and a resource which has changed perspectives, opening opportunities to manage water for both flooding and consumption.

A variety of innovative solutions have been used in Rotterdam to maximize water management whilst reducing the impacts of developments, which with traditional hard engineering could be costly both economically and spatially. These include a strong push towards increasing water storage with Green roofs and water squares. The latter of these doubles up as basin storage during flood events. Traditional methods have also been redeveloped towards the blue-green city goal. These include increasing the multi-functionality of dykes, which are needed to reinforce the city against sea level rise, and now have amenities built into their return face. The combination of flood defenses, open green space and urban redevelopment have increased the sustainability of this process and opportunities for funding.

The risk of Climate change to a delta city like Rotterdam assisted the cultural shift towards a Blue-Green city with future projects such as Rotterdam weather encouraging grants and public participation in city gardens and more sustainable living practices.

== Urban Flood Resilience Research Project (2016-2020) ==
Thorne currently leads the Urban Flood Resilience research project (2016-2020), also funded by the EPSRC. A paper was recently published that presents an overview of the consortium and its research.

== The Gravel Bed Rivers Workshop (1980-present) ==
Colin Thorne played a part in the creation of the Gravel Bed Rivers Workshop which has been running every 5 years since 1980 and is one of the editors in the first three Gravel-Bed Rivers books written after each of these workshops. The Workshops are designed to present an authoritative review of recent progress in understanding the morphology and processes in gravel bed rivers and each has an accompanying book or special issue journal.

- 1980 Gravel Bed Rivers Workshop 1: "Fluvial Processes, Engineering and Management of gravel bed rivers" United Kingdom

- 1985 Gravel Bed Rivers Workshop 2: "Sediment Transport in gravel bed rivers" Colorado State, US

- 1990 Gravel Bed Rivers Workshop 3: "Dynamics of gravel bed rivers" Florence

- 1995 Gravel Bed Rivers Workshop 4: "Gravel bed Rivers in the environment" Washington State, US

- 2000 Gravel Bed Rivers Workshop 5: "Management goals in gravel-bed rivers" New Zealand

- 2005 Gravel Bed Rivers Workshop 6: "From Process Understanding to River Restoration in gravel bed rivers" Austria

- 2010 Gravel Bed Rivers Workshop 7: "Gravel bed river Processes, tools, and environments" Canada

Keynote speeches for Ice and dams in gravel bed rivers.

- 2015 Gravel Bed Rivers Workshop 8: "Gravel bed rivers and disasters" Japan

The 8th gravel bed river workshop provides some speeches online.

The 9th Gravel Bed River Workshop is set to be on 11 January 2021 in Chile. "Gravel Bed Rivers: Processes, resilience and management in a changing environment"

== FAST Danube Project on the lower River Danube in Romania and Bulgaria (2016-19) ==
The main objective of the "FAST Danube" is to "identify the technical solutions to be implemented, in order to ensure navigation conditions on the Romanian-Bulgarian common sector of the Danube". Colin Thorne appraised the likely geomorphic responses to proposed structural interventions by the project and compare these to responses predicted by 2D modelling.

== Mount St Helens and the North Fork Toutle River ==
Professor Thorne has been involved in research around the impact of the 1980 Mount St Helens eruption and the long term impact of the associated debris avalanche on the North Fork Toutle River. The eruption dramatically increased sediment yields and led to the creation of a sediment retention structure.

=== System Response ===
A lot of Thorne's work has focused on how, over time, the system has responded to the complete resetting of the topography and environment. The Alluvial Phase Space Diagram was created to attempt to define how the channel has changed. Moreover, the rate law approach was suggested as a method to understand fluvial response to a major, instantaneous disturbance.

=== Sediment Management Plan ===
Thorne has been part of a team which suggested a phased sediment management plan to help downstream communities cope with the long lasting impacts which have resulted from the eruption. Where possible this plan only uses dredging as a last resort in order to reduce ecological and economic costs.

=== Links to other research ===
The stream evolution model which Thorne co-developed has been applied to the North Fork Toutle in order to classify reaches under the different stream stages set out in the model.

=== University of Nottingham Field Trip ===
Thorne has led field trips for physical geography students from the University of Nottingham to measure channel responses in the North Fork Toutle River. Part of the practical river restoration and management module.

== Lower Mississippi River Research Projects ==
=== Analysis of Suspended Sediment Transport data (2000) ===
Thorne was the principal investigator for an analysis of suspended sediment transport data compiled by the US Army Corps of Engineers (USGS).

The final report found that the suspended component of bed material load constitutes only a small percentage of total suspended load, this percentage increased with discharge. Coarse suspended sediment concentrations were also found to have a stronger positive relationship with discharge than fine sediment concentrations. No temporal trends were found when analyzing this set of data.

==== Recommendations ====
Thorne went on to make 6 recommendations in the final report:

1. Data collection needed to continue into the foreseeable future to support analysis and prediction of morphological evolution, which is a result of sediment transfer and deposition.
2. Data analysts and data gathers should consult on any changes in collection procedure, so that data collected is suitable for the questions under investigation.
3. The report called for co-ordination between sample sites so that comparisons could be enhanced between these sites.
4. The investigators were concerned with the limitations of predicting sediment movement at high flows beyond the dataset. Therefore, it recommended consideration of an advanced, strategic sampling program for the Lower Mississippi River to replace the present routine sampling program.
5. Future size gradations of all measured suspended sediment load samples should be pre-determined. If possible, suspended sediment loads should be synthesized from bed material gradations in historical datasets.
6. Finally, the report recommended the consideration of a trial program to measure bed material load in the Lower Mississippi Basin. This could ascertain the contribution of bed load to bed material transport, responsible for driving morphological evolution and response in the system.

=== Future River Analysis and Management Evaluation (2016-21) ===
Colin is currently involved in an Inter-disciplinary study to develop a hybrid numerical/rules-based model capable of forecasting future channel changes in the Lower Mississippi River triggered by changes in external drivers and controls of channel form and function. This model is being developed based on the existing HEC-RAS/SIAM and POTAMOD models.

=== Mississippi River, mid-Batararia and mid-Breton Diversion projects (2018-19) ===
Colin Thorne provide Expert support on geomorphic and sediment aspects of designing intake and control structures through the Mississippi River for the Coastal Protection and Restoration Authority of Louisiana. This project will rebuild, sustain, and maintain land currently subject to erosion in that part of the Mississippi Delta.

== UK Environment Agency ==
=== Severn-Trent Region (1994-1999) ===
Strategic project, on the River Idle, to design river rehabilitation structures to enhance the physical environment and aesthetics of a regulated, channelised lowland river. The project "rehabilitation design was required to tackle these deficiencies through improvements which did not compromise the other obligations of the managing authority."

The project focused on the need for hydraulic modelling to clearly identify restoration techniques would not increase flood risk. The main types of restoration introduced into the study site were flow deflectors to increase hydraulic and sediment heterogeneity, these were then measured using BENDFLOW, HMODEL2, FCFA and HEC-RAS to find the optimum positions and impacts on flow.

=== Wessex Region ===
==== Fluvial audit of the Hawkcombe Stream (2002) ====
A fluvial audit of the Hawkcombe Stream was carried out in 2002. The site was of interest due to flooding in the town of Porlock as a result of sediment dynamics from the proximal upland reaches of the stream. The results of the study have also been presented and are available on the River Restoration Center website

==== Sediment Management Plan for the Hawkcombe Stream (2006-2010) ====
Colin used the iSIS hydrodynamic model to construct a sediment management plan for the Hawkcombe Stream. He remained a consultant to modify flood defense measures so that they would interact better with sediment dynamics. Colin also helped to develop River Energy Auditing Scheme (REAS) on the Hawkcombe stream which classifies reaches into sediment sources, pathways or sinks in order to understand how sediment dynamics will impact proposed flood management schemes. The understanding of sediment sink reaches was later developed into the stage-0 restoration concept.

== BP pipeline river crossings ==
=== BTC Pipeline (2003-2004) ===
Professor Colin Thorne undertook a rapid geomorphological assessment of potential channel instability at points where the Baku Tbilisi Ceyhan (BTC) pipeline crossed river channels.

=== WREP Pipeline (2010-2011) ===
The Western Route Export Pipeline (WREP) transports crude oil from the Caspian Sea to the Black Sea. Colin provided Rapid geomorphological assessment of potential for channel instability at the two major river crossings in 2010/11.

== Mekong River Commission (2010-2011) ==
Colin Thorne led the Sediment Expert Group responsible for reviewing compliance with Mekong River Commission Preliminary Design Guidance on sediment management and potential impacts on sediments, morphology and nutrient balance in the Mekong River that might stem from construction and operation of a main stream dam at Xayaburi in the Lao People's Democratic Republic.

It was recommended that modifications be made to the dam design and operating strategy to avoid or mitigate adverse trans-boundary and cumulative impacts. These recommendations were accepted and acted upon in a $100 million package to allow sediment periodically out of the reservoir.

== China-UK joint flood study (2007-11) ==
Colin was part of a collaborative study of present and future flood risks in the Taihu Basin, China involving multidisciplinary work and work packages on hydrology, hydraulics, infrastructure, socio-economics and risk modelling. The UK Foresight Future Flooding approach was used identifying drivers of increased flood risk and ranking them according to their importance in contributing to future flooding. The qualitative and quantitative analyses provided a comprehensive vision of possible future flood risk to inform policy development and decision making.

The project was lead jointly by the Institute of Water Resources and Hydropower Research (IWHR) in Beijing, and the University of Nottingham, UK. The project was funded in the United Kingdom by the Government Office for Science, DEFRA, the Foreign and Commonwealth Office, the United Nations Department for Economic and Social Affairs and the Natural Environment Research Council.

The lessons learnt in applying the UK Flood Foresight approach in to a different context has been shown to have learning opportunities and implications for flood management in the UK. Moreover, a framework was developed for continued long term flooding scenario analysis in China as a result of the project.

== "Stage Zero" Restoration ==
A webpage designated as a Stage Zero information Hub was started by professor Colin Thorne and is available in the external links below along with Stage Zero seminars led by Colin.

Thorne's work on the Stream Evolution Model has led to the application of Stage Zero, otherwise known as "valley floor resetting", as a river restoration condition achievable through a variety of process-based techniques, from 'light-touch' beaver dam analog and post‐assisted logjam methods, to geomorphic gradeline, valley reset methods.

As Stage Zero projects have developed it has become vital that practitioners, scientists and stakeholders should share their perspectives and knowledge in a social learning environment. To facilitate this the Oregon Watershed Enhancement Board and Institute for Natural Resources at Oregon State University convened a Stage Zero stream restoration workshop in November 2020. Brian Cluer provided an introduction to Stage 0 and the Stream Evolution Model that Thorne had worked on. Prof. Colin Thorne attended and moderated panel discussions on 'The uncertainties and questions regarding restoration to achieve a Stage Zero condition' and 'Monitoring approaches and challenges'. Breakout rooms relating to these panel discussions allowed all stakeholders to be contribute. The workshop also held talks on the practises and techniques for creating Stage Zero sites as well as the evolving state of knowledge.

Along with the Upper Deschutes Watershed Council, Thorne has been involved in the Stage Zero restoration of Whychus creek which has created an anastomosing channel in an effort to support increased numbers of anadromous and resident fish, improve stream habitat and expanded biodiversity.

== Stream Reconnaissance Handbook ==
Thorne is the author of the Stream Reconnaissance Handbook which utilises Fluvial Geomorphology to support accurate classification of the channel, yield reliable pointers to the nature of geomorphic and sedimentary processes, characterize the state of channel stability or instability, and indicate the severity of any instability related problems.
