= Oregon Department of Emergency Management =

State agency managing emergency services

Oregon Department of Emergency Management (OEM)

Agency overview
- Formed: 1981
- Preceding agencies: Oregon Emergency Management Division; Oregon Office of Emergency Management
- Jurisdiction: State of Oregon
- Headquarters: Salem, Oregon; 44.90137°N 123.01192°W
- Agency executive: Erin McMahon, Director
- Parent department: State of Oregon
- Website: oregon.gov/oem/Pages/About-Us.aspx

The Oregon Department of Emergency Management (OEM) is a department of the state government of the U.S. state of Oregon responsible for coordinating and maintaining a statewide emergency services system, authorized by the U.S. state of Oregon legislature to coordinate efforts to "prevent, prepare for, respond to and recover from emergencies".

== History ==
Following federal passage of the Robert T. Stafford Disaster Relief and Emergency Assistance Act in 1974, and the 1979 establishment of FEMA, in 1981 the Oregon legislature established the state's Emergency Management Division within the State Executive Department through Oregon Laws 1981, Chapter 615 (Senate Bill 5548). The Division was charged with carrying out and coordinating the civil defense of the state; maintaining liaison and cooperating with civil defense agencies and organizations of other states and the Federal Government; and carrying out other duties as prescribed by the Governor.

In 1993, passage of Senate Bill 157 (Oregon Laws 1993, Chapter 187) transferred the Emergency Management Division to the Department of State Police, renaming it the "Office of Emergency Management" (OEM). This law also incorporated the Interstate Emergency Management Assistance Compact (EMAC) into statute and authorized the Oregon Emergency Response System (OERS).

The Oregon Office of Emergency Management was later transferred under the Oregon Military Department.

In 2021, the passage of House Bill 2927 established OEM as its own standalone department - The Oregon Department of Emergency Management starting July 1, 2022.

== Description ==
OEM maintains emergency services systems as mandated in Oregon Revised Statutes, and Oregon Revised Statutes, Chapter 401 — Emergency Management and Services., by "planning, preparing and providing for the prevention, mitigation and management of emergencies or disasters that present a threat to the lives and property of citizens of and visitors to the State of Oregon." OEM's former director has said,

What we do today to prepare will save lives and property tomorrow, or whenever a disaster strikes. As we build a culture of preparedness in Oregon we are empowering Oregonians to be disaster survivors, not victims. We want Oregonians to be prepared, not scared.

— Andrew Phelps, Former Director, OEM

It is the mission of the Oregon Department of Emergency Management to lead collaborative state-wide efforts, inclusive of all partners and the communities they serve, to ensure capability to get help in an emergency and to protect, mitigate, prepare for, respond to, and recover from emergencies or disasters regardless of cause. Its vision is to establish an equitable culture of preparedness that empowers Oregon’s whole community to thrive in times of crisis. This is done by embracing five core values:

1. Advocacy - We value the perspectives of our team, our partners and those we serve, and support their efforts to advance our shared interests.
2. Collaboration - We value sincere, communicative and supportive partnerships that encourage trust and make us better than we are on our own.
3. Innovation - We value ideas that challenge current practices while we seek out and leverage new opportunities to improve our ability to serve.
4. Leadership - We value opportunities to lead our emergency management and 9-1-1 communities with integrity, respect, courage and accountability, and to foster the development of leaders within our organization.
5. Service – We value our partners and others we serve and strive to deliver excellence in all that we do.

Administratively, OEM There are eleven sections of OEM:

- Director's Office
- Strategic Communications & Partnerships
- Human Resources
- Information Technology
- Finance
- Preparedness
- Response & Recovery Operations
- Mitigation
- Public Assistance
- State 9-1-1 Program
- Statewide Interoperability and Watch

OEM manages resources for disaster assistance, cross-jurisdictional aid to protect lives, property and the environment, and other assistance with emergency incidents. OEM also manages grant opportunities, preparedness workshops, state preparedness exercises and training, and toolkits for emergency managers.

Within OEM's responsibilities are the disaster declaration process, the Oregon Emergency Response System, the Real-Time Assessment and Planning Tool for Oregon, and the state's search and rescue program.

OEM maintains the State of Oregon Emergency Coordination Center in Salem.
