= Tom Marsh (politician) =

American politician

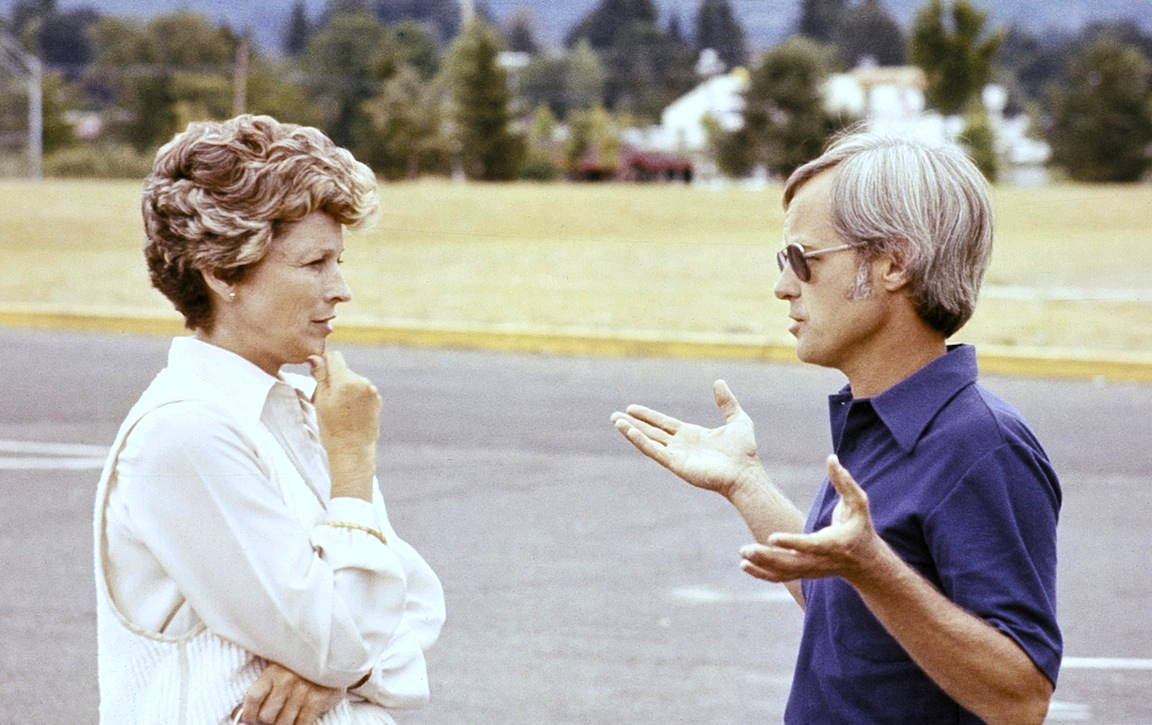
- Tom Marsh talking with Nancy Ryles, his successor in the Oregon House, in 1979

Member of the Oregon House of Representatives from the 5th district
- In office 1975–1979
- Preceded by: Lewis Hampton
- Succeeded by: Nancy Ryles

Personal details
- Born: December 7, 1939 (age 86) Lafayette, Indiana
- Party: Democratic
- Occupation: teacher

Tom Marsh (born December 7, 1939) is a former member of the Oregon House of Representatives, representing portions of Washington County, Oregon, United States. He served two terms, from January 1975 through 1978, in the 58th Oregon Legislative Assembly and the 59th.

Marsh graduated from the University of Oregon, earning bachelor's and master's degrees in history and English.

A Democrat, he was first elected to the Oregon Legislature in 1974. Prior to that, he had been president of the Beaverton Education Association. He also was a teacher of history and government at Sunset High School, north of Beaverton. He continued teaching when the legislature was not in session. In 1975, Governor Robert W. Straub appointed Marsh to a two-year term on the Governor's Committee on Aging.

Tom Marsh was reelected to the House in 1976, but in 1978 decided not to run for a third term. He was succeeded by Nancy Ryles.

The House district represented by Marsh was numbered District 5 at the time (and since 1971), and remained so under Ryles, but became District 7 in 1982, as a result of a reapportionment plan passed by the Oregon Legislature in 1981, based on data from the 1980 U.S. Census.

Marsh later served on the Washington County Council on Aging.
