= Oregon Watershed Enhancement Board =

State agency promoting watershed health

Oregon Wagershed Enhancement Board

Agency overview
- Formed: 1987
- Jurisdiction: State of Oregon
- Employees: 33
- Annual budget: US$69.5 m (2019-21)
- Agency executives: Meta Loftsgaarden, Executive Director; Jason Robison, Board Co-Chair, Tribal Representative; Randy Labbe, Board Co-Chair

Oregon Watershed Enhancement Board (OWEB), a state agency of Oregon in the United States, provides grants to restore watershed health and improve local streams, rivers, wetlands and natural areas in Oregon. Board membership includes commissioners of Oregon's Natural Resources Board and members of the public.

== History ==
The Governor's Watershed Enhancement Board GWEB) was established in 1987 and began accepting applications to fund watershed improvement projects in November of that year.

The World of Coos Bay reported the board's charge:

The Governor's Watershed Enhancement Board, created by the 1987 Legislature, is accepting applications for projects. The board is authorized to distribute up to $500,000 for on-the-ground watershed improvement efforts in the 1987-89 biennium. Project examples include planting along streambanks, streamside fencing, in-stream habitat improvement and development of wildlife and grazing management plans, according to Lorraine Stahr of the Oregon Water Resources Department.

In the primary election on May 17, 1988, Oregon voters approved Measure 1, authorizing loans for fish protection and watershed restoration. In 1993, Senate Bill 81 of the Legislature provided $10 million for the Grande Ronde in Northeastern Oregon, and the South Coast and Rogue Basins in Southwestern Oregon, a pilot project known as the Oregon Watershed Health Program. It became part of GWEB in 1995.

In 1998, voterts also approved Measure 66, dedicating some Lottery funding to parks, beaches, habitat, and watershed protection. The following year, the Oregon Watershed Enhancement Board replaced GWEB, and expanded the five member board with six public members.

Passage of Measure 76 in Oregon's 2010 General Election continued lottery funding for parks, beaches, wildlife habitat, watershed protection beyond 2014 and modified the funding process.

In November 2020 OWEB led a Stage Zero River Restoration Workshop with panels moderated by Prof. Colin Thorne. They also played a role in the creation of a Stage Zero website to encourage similar restoration projects.

== Board membership and budget ==
As of 2019, Board membership includes six voting members of the public, five voting commissioners of the state's Natural Resource Board, and seven advisory non-voting members. Oregon's Secretary of State described the board's work: "Community members and landowners use scientific criteria to decide jointly what needs to be done to conserve and improve rivers and natural habitats in the places where they live." The OWEB 2019–2021 biennium budget approved by the legislature totaled $138,910,142 USD.

== See also ==
- Oregon Department of Environmental Quality
- Oregon Department of Fish and Wildlife
