= Optimized Multicolor Immunofluorescence Panel =

Optimized Multicolor Immunofluorescence Panel, abbreviation OMIP, was a series of standardized multi-color flow cytometry panel launched by International Society for Advancement of Cytometry (ISAC), published in the form of columns in Cytometry Part A. The first two OMIP articles were published in September 2010 issue of this journal.

== Purpose ==
The goals of OMIPs are:

1. to alleviate the development time for researchers who wish to use the same (or highly similar) panels
2. to provide a starting point for the creation of novel OMIPs, and
3. to provide a mechanism for attribution to the developers of the panel via citation of the publication.

== List ==
No.	No. of colors	Purpose	Species	Cell types	Paper	Year	Cytometry
OMIP-001	16	T-cell cytokine production after in vitro stimulation and phenotyping of cytokine-producing T-cells	Human	PBMC		2010	BD LSR II
OMIP-002	16	Specificity and phenotype of CD8+ T-cells	Human	PBMC, bone marrow mononuclear cells		2010	BD LSR II
OMIP-003	12	Phenotyping memory B cells	human	PBMC, bone marrow, and tonsil mononuclear cell		2011	BD LSR II
OMIP-004	15	Determine Treg levels and to provide an in depth characterization of Tregs	Human	PBMC, ACK-lysed blood		2012	BD LSRFortessa
OMIP-005	11	T cell cytokine production and memory phenotype	Rhesus macaque	PBMC		2012	BD LSR II
OMIP-006	9	Enumerating and phenotyping of T regulatory cells and subsets	Human	PBMC		2012	BD LSR II
OMIP-007	14	Characterize the phenotype, maturation, and activation of NK cells	Human	PBMC		2012	BD LSR II
OMIP-008	11	T cell cytokine production following in vitro stimulation	Human	PBMC, T cell clones/lines, tumor-resident T cell lines		2012	BD LSR II
OMIP-009	10	phenotype and function of CD4+ and CD8+ T-cells	Human	PBMC		2012	BD LSR II
OMIP-010	10	immunophenotyping of small hematopoietic cell	Human	Cerebrospinal fluid, bone marrow, peripheral blood		2012	
OMIP-011	8	Characterization of CECs in peripheral blood	Human	Whole blood, RBC-lysed and washed		2012	
OMIP-012	9	Human leukocyte reconstitution and phenotype	Humanized mouse	Whole blood, Ficoll-separated PBMC, splenocytes		2012	
OMIP-013	13	T-cell differentiation	Human	PBMC		2012	
OMIP-014	12	T-cell cytokine production and function after in vitro stimulation	Human	Cryopreserved PBMC		2012	
OMIP-015	13	T-reg characterization and T-cell activation	Human	PBMC		2013	
OMIP-016	10	Quality and phenotype of antigen-specific CD4 and CD8 T cells	Cynomolgus macaque or Human	Fresh or cryopreserved PBMCs		2013	
OMIP-017	13	CD4+ helper T-cell subsets (Th1, Th2, Th9, Th17, Th17Th1, Th22 and TFH)	Human	PBMC		2013	
OMIP-018	15	Phenotype of CD4 T cell subsets via chemokine receptor expression	Human	Fresh PBMC, Bone marrow mononuclear cells		2013	
OMIP-019	14	γδT-cells, iNKT-cells, haematopoietic precursors	Human	PBMC		2013	
OMIP-020	12	γδ T-cell differentiation phenotype	Human	PBMC		2014	
OMIP-021	14	NKT cells, γδ T-cells, MAIT cells, Memory T cell subsets	Human	PBMC		2014	
OMIP-022	14	T-cell phenotyping, memory categorization, cytokine production, and function following in vitro stimulation	Human	Cryopreserved PBMC (adult and infant)		2014	
OMIP-023	10	In-depth phenotyping of the main leukocyte subtypes in one run	Human	Fresh EDTA-treated peripheral blood, RBC-lysed and Fresh EDTA-treated Cord-blood		2014	
OMIP-024	18	Characterize the phenotype of PBMC leukocyte subsets	Human	Cryopreserved PBMC from adults and infants		2014	
OMIP-025	16	Characterization of antigen-specific T cells, TFH-like cells and NK cells	Human	Cryopreserved PBMC		2014	
OMIP-026	14	Phenotype of B and plasma cells	Rhesus macaque, African green monkey	Fresh whole blood, PBMCs, mononuclear cells of bone marrow, lymph node, spleen, tonsil		2015	
OMIP-027							
OMIP-028							
OMIP-029							
OMIP-030							
OMIP-031							
OMIP-032							
OMIP-033							
OMIP-034							
OMIP-035							
OMIP-036							
OMIP-037							
OMIP-038							
OMIP-039							
OMIP-040							
OMIP-041							
OMIP-042							
OMIP-043							
OMIP-044							
OMIP-045							
OMIP-046							
OMIP-047							
OMIP-048							
OMIP-049	19	Subset analysis of hematopoiesis and hematopoietic disease	Human	Any source containing human myeloid cells		2018	BD LSR II
OMIP-050	28						
OMIP-051							
OMIP-052							
OMIP-053							
OMIP-054							
OMIP-055							
OMIP-056							
OMIP-057							
OMIP-058							
OMIP-059							
OMIP-060							
OMIP-061							
OMIP-062	14	Myeloid and innate/adaptive lymphoid comprehensive immunophenotyping	Human	Whole peripheral blood, cord blood, PBMCs, nasal aspirate, and tracheal aspirate samples		2019	BD LSRFortessa
OMIP-063							
OMIP-064							
OMIP-065							
OMIP-066							
OMIP-067							
OMIP-068							
OMIP-069							
OMIP-070							
OMIP-071							
OMIP-072							
OMIP-073							
OMIP-074							
OMIP-075							
OMIP-076							
OMIP-077							
OMIP-078							
OMIP-079							
OMIP-080							
OMIP-081							
OMIP-082	25						
OMIP-083	18						
OMIP-084	28						
OMIP-085	8						
OMIP-086	22						
OMIP-087							
OMIP-088							
OMIP-089	8						
OMIP-090	18						
OMIP-091	27						
OMIP-092	6						
OMIP-093	41						
OMIP-094	24						
OMIP-095							
OMIP-096							
OMIP-097							
OMIP-098							
OMIP-099							
OMIP-100							
OMIP-101	27	Broad immunophenotyping of leukocytes including myeloid (neutrophils, monocytes, mDCs) and lymphoid cell lineages (conventional T cells, DURT cells, γδT cells, B cells, NK cells, ILCs)	Human	Fresh or fixed, cryopreserved whole blood		2024	BD FACSymphony A5
