= Oregon Employment Department =

The Employment Department is the agency of the government of the U.S. state of Oregon which is responsible for administration of the state's unemployment insurance program, operation of a statewide employment service through a system of public employment offices, statistical research and reporting to assist job development in both the public and private sector, and provision oversight, certification, and technical assistance to providers of child care.

Although the agency as it exists today was created in 1993 by the Oregon Legislative Assembly, its history dates back to the 1913 opening of the first public employment office within the state by the City of Portland, and incorporates programs of the previous Oregon State Employment Service (established in 1935) and other state agencies.

== Oregon Labor Market Information System ==
The Oregon Employment Department Research Division maintains a website called "QualityInfo", which provides access to labor market information through articles, data tools, and publications.

Publications are available online through the QualityInfo website. Statewide articles are featured on the homepage, while regional articles are found in separate pages for specific areas such as Portland Metro.
