= Oregon University System =

Public university system in Oregon

The Oregon University System (OUS) was administered by the Oregon State Board of Higher Education (the "Board") and the Chancellor of the OUS, who was appointed by the Board. It was disbanded in June 2015.

OUS was responsible for governing the state's seven public universities. Legislation passed in 2013 allowed Oregon public universities the option to set up their own institutional governing boards and the state's three largest universities (Oregon State University, University of Oregon, Portland State University) opted for institutional boards that became effective July 1, 2014. The four remaining regional universities in the OUS system (Eastern Oregon University, Oregon Institute of Technology, Southern Oregon University, Western Oregon University) later opted for institutional boards, effective July 1, 2015.

Administrative work that was conducted by OUS has been managed since June 2015 by academic and financial units of the Oregon Office of University Coordination and the Oregon Higher Education Coordinating Commission.
