= Oregon Corporations Division =

The Corporation Division is a division of the Oregon Secretary of State of the U.S. state of Oregon which helps startup and existing businesses grow and thrive by using faster and smarter business processes. Included in the Corporation Division is the Office of Small Business Assistance, which cuts through red tape and is an independent voice for small business within state government.

The Corporation Division maintains the Oregon Business Registry online application which allows businesses to register online. There is also a Business Name Search application which the public can use to find data about businesses such as address, registered agents and annual reports.

The Corporation Division provides Notary public training in person and online as well as the notary public examination to receive a commission.

The Corporation Division also maintains the UCC Uniform Commercial Code online filing which the public can use to look up personal liens.

== See also ==
- Oregon Secretary of State
