= Oregon Occupational Safety and Health Division =

US state government agency

The Oregon Occupational Safety and Health Division (Oregon OSHA or OR-OSHA) is a state government agency that regulates workplace safety and health in the U.S. state of Oregon. Oregon OSHA is a division of the Oregon Department of Consumer and Business Services and operates under a formal state-plan agreement with Occupational Safety and Health Administration (OSHA). Oregon OSHA's regulatory authority comes from the Oregon Safe Employment Act (OSEA); its jurisdiction covers most public and private sector workplaces in the state. Oregon OSHA's expressed mission is "to advance and improve workplace safety and health for all workers in Oregon."

== History ==
From 1941 to 1989, the Accident Prevention Division (APD) – a division of the state Industrial Accident Commission – regulated workplace safety and health in Oregon. On October 2, 1989, APD became the Oregon Occupational Safety and Health Division. The name change was intended to "help workers and employers identify the division as the state's occupational safety and health enforcement agency and to more accurately reflect its diverse mission." Nevertheless, there is a strong continuity between APD and Oregon OSHA, linked by the OSEA.

The OSEA, signed into law by Governor Tom McCall on July 22, 1973, was landmark legislation with a purpose to "assure as far as possible safe and healthful working conditions for every workingman and woman in Oregon." Oregon OSHA's status as an independent state-run program became final in 2005 when acting Assistant U.S. Secretary of Labor Jonathan Snare presented the final approval agreement to Governor Ted Kulongoski – 38 years after Tom McCall signed the initial state-plan agreement with the federal government. Final approval meant that Oregon OSHA could run its own program, for the most part, without federal enforcement authority.

== Programs and services ==
Oregon OSHA's major program areas are enforcement, consultation services, standards and technical resources, education, and conferences. Oregon OSHA also has a nationally certified occupational health laboratory and a resource center that lends books and videos to the public.

== See also ==
- National Institute for Occupational Safety and Health (NIOSH)
- Occupational safety and health
