= Oregon Housing and Community Services Department =

U.S. Government agency

The Oregon Housing and Community Services Department (OHCS) is the housing finance agency of the government of the U.S. state of Oregon. It administers programs providing financing assistance for single family homes, new construction or rehabilitation of multi-family affordable housing developments, and grants and tax credits to promote affordable housing. Prior to 1991, when the Oregon Legislative Assembly merged the Housing Agency with State Community Services forming OHCS to eliminate duplicative costs and provide better coordination of related activities, financing and service programs were operated separately.

The state housing agency was established in 1971 to set and administer overall state housing policies. Its scope was expanded in 1973 to include financing assistance for low income family housing through the issuance of tax-exempt bonds.
