= Oregon State Archives =

State government agency in the United States

- Archives Division of the Office of the Secretary of State of Oregon
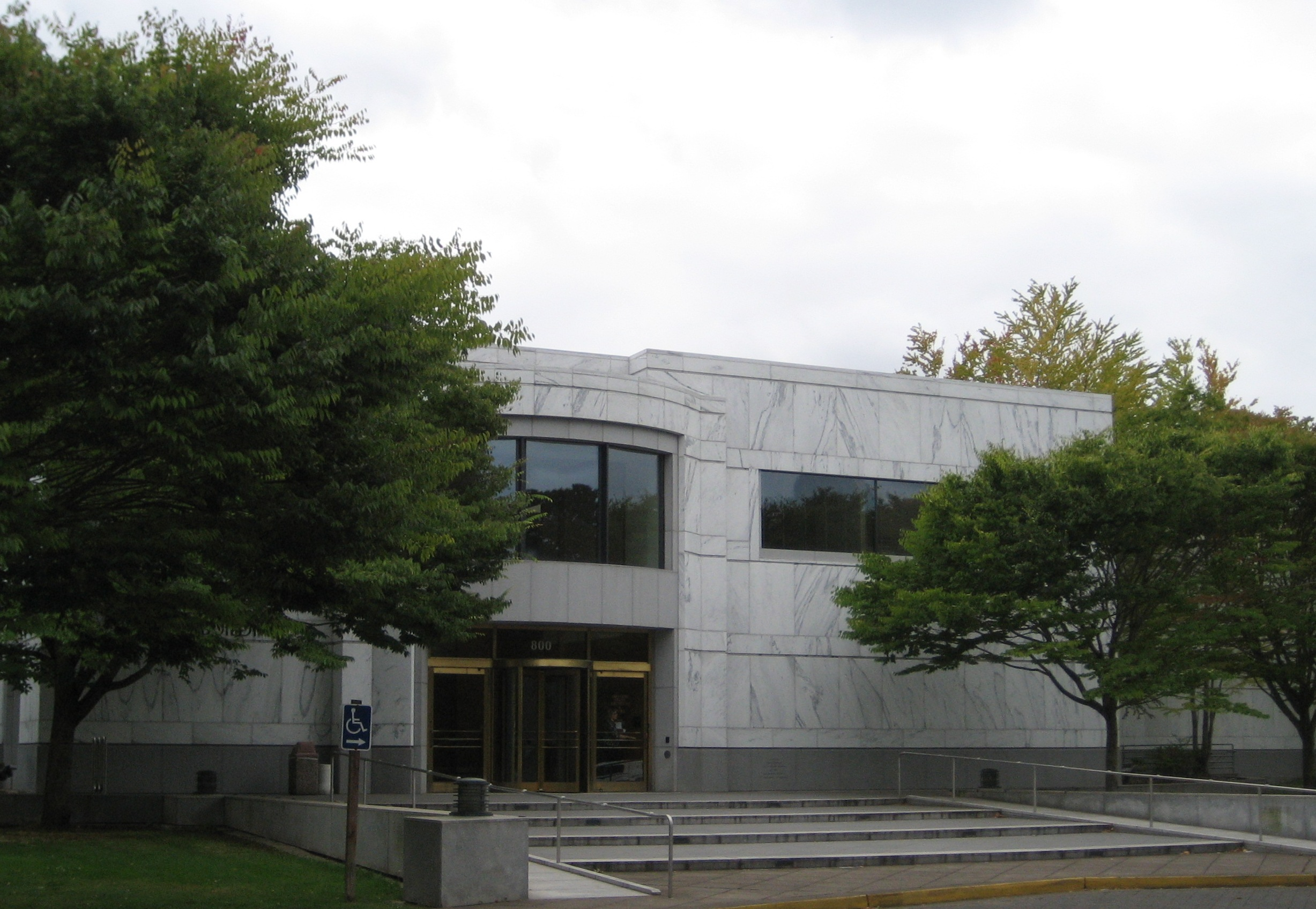
- The Cecil L. Edwards Archives Building

Details
- Location: Salem, Oregon, United States
- Coordinates: 44.946011°N 123.025562°W
- State Archivist: Stephanie Clark
- Established: 1947
- Building: Cecil L. Edwards Archives Building
- Size: 50,000 sq. ft.
- Website: Official website

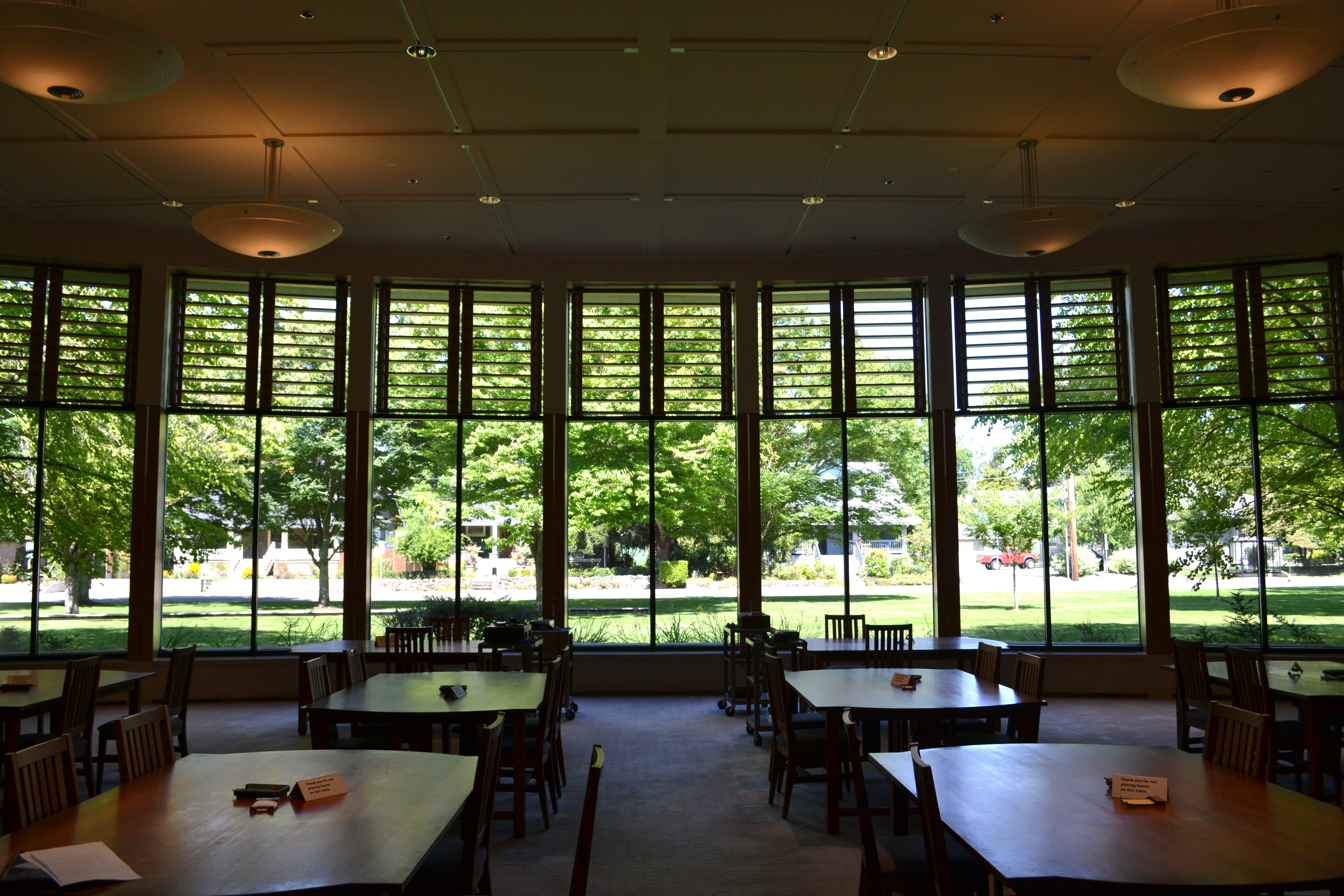

The Archives Division of the Office of the Secretary of State of Oregon, or the Oregon State Archives, is an agency of the Oregon Secretary of State charged with preserving and providing access to government records. The Oregon State Archives is open for research by appointment. It also publishes the Oregon Blue Book and Oregon Administrative Rules. The position of State Archivist was authorized by the state legislature in 1945, though not filled until 1947, and was originally a staff position within the Oregon State Library. The duties and functions of the archivist were placed under the purview of the Secretary of State in 1973, when that office was deemed the chief records officer of the state government by the legislature. As of 2019 it comprises the state archivist, a reference unit, a publications unit, an information and records management unit, and the State Records Center.

== History ==
Before the division was established, Oregon's record keeping had been delegated to various agencies resulting in disorganization and loss. Following a fire at the capitol building in 1935 and in the face of possible air raids during World War II, the need for a state-level archivist became clear. The first state archivist was David Duniway.

In 1991 the two-story Oregon State Archives Building was opened, providing two vaults, climate-controlled storage, and 50,000 sq. ft. of space. Its exterior is marble and granite. Cecil L. Edwards (1906–1995), who served as chief clerk of the House in 1963 and as state legislative historian from 1975 to 1993, died on December 22, 1995, after which the building was renamed in his honor.

== List of state archivists ==
- David C. Duniway (1946–1972)
- James D. Porter (1972–May 1984)
- Dale Hildebrand (interim)
- Roy C. Turnbaugh (1985–Sept. 2005)
- Mary Beth Herkert (Dec. 2005–May 2019)
- Stephanie Clark (2019)
