= Oregon Teachers Standards and Practices Commission =

Oregon licensing agency for teachers

Oregon Teachers Standards and Practices Commission (TSPC), established in the U.S. state of Oregon in 1965, is the nation's oldest educator standards board. It is Oregon's licensing agency for all educators. The agency approves teacher preparation programs offered by Oregon colleges and universities; licenses teachers, administrators and other personnel employed in Oregon schools; and takes disciplinary actions when educators commit crimes or violate competent and ethical performance standards.

In 2014, TSPC began a four-year rollout of a "teacher performance assessment" exam, or an "ed-T-P-A". Developed at Stanford University, Ed-T-P-A puts a focus on "planning lessons, instructing students, and assessing learning".

The Oregon Higher Education Coordinating Commission (HECC) supported TSPC efforts in 2018 to explore alternatives to standardized testing to improve diversity in the teaching workforce. In 2022, both agencies worked on the 2022 Oregon Educator Equity Report to identify institutional and structural practices impacting diverse educators.

== See also ==
- National Board for Professional Teaching Standards
- Educator effectiveness
