= Oregon Arts Commission =

American state agency

The Oregon Arts Commission is a governor-appointed body of nine commissioners who allocate grants for artists based in the U.S. state of Oregon. It receives the bulk of its funding through the National Endowment for the Arts, the state, and the Oregon Cultural Trust. The commission provides funding for local artists through their fellowship programs.

== History ==
Established in 1967, the Oregon Arts Commission was initially a stand-alone governmental entity. However, it became a division of the Oregon Economic and Community Development Department in 1993.

From 1980 to 1984, the Commission was chaired by John Frohnmayer, who later became chair of the National Endowment for the Arts and a candidate for the United States Senate.

As of January 18, 2008, the Oregon Arts Commission has added support for film, in addition to the other projects it funds.
