= Oregon Department of Consumer and Business Services =

State agency

The Oregon Department of Consumer and Business Services (DCBS) is the agency of the government of the U.S. state of Oregon, which has wide-ranging regulatory and consumer-protection authority in Oregon. It administers laws and rules governing workers' compensation benefits, workplace safety and health, building codes, and the operation of both insurance companies and financial institutions.

The department provides services to both citizens and businesses, and as of 2006, had a budget of US$560 million, and employed a staff of 1,088.

== Divisions ==
- Building Codes
- Division of Financial Regulation
- Oregon Health Insurance Marketplace
- Oregon Senior Health Insurance Benefits Assistance Program
- Occupational Safety and Health
- Workers' Compensation

== Independent professional licensing and regulatory agencies ==
In addition to licensing and regulating a vast array of professions, industries and trades directly, DCBS provides administrative support services to the state's several independent boards and commissions which have jurisdiction over particular professions or trades. It publishes guides and a website to assist business owners and professionals in determining and meeting licensing and regulatory requirements, whether or not under the direct jurisdiction of the department.
