= Oregon Audits Division =

The Audits Division is a division of the Oregon Secretary of State of the U.S. state of Oregon which serves as chief auditor of public accounts. The mission of the Audits Division is to protect the public interest while helping improve Oregon government.

Auditors ensure public funds are spent as legally required, used to their best advantage and properly accounted for. Audits are conducted in compliance with stringent professional standards and use analytical tools to examine millions of records and be as meticulous as possible. All reports are publicly available.

The Audits Division administers Municipal Audit Law to ensure local governments comply. Municipal Audit Law (ORS 297.405 to 297.555 and 297.990) requires Oregon’s local governments to submit annual financial reports to the Secretary of State.

== See also ==
- Oregon Secretary of State
