= Oregon Cultural Trust =

Oregon Cultural Trust is a cultural promotion and preservation organization in the U.S. state of Oregon. It provides grants and funding to arts, humanities, and heritage organizations to stabilize and expand.

The Trust's partners include the Oregon Arts Commission, Oregon Council for the Humanities, Oregon Heritage Commission, Oregon Historical Society, and the Oregon State Historic Preservation Office. The trust is funded by the State of Oregon, corporate sponsors, and private donations. A special series of vehicle license plate also helps fund the trust.
