= Oregon Youth Development Division =

Oregon state agency

Youth Development Division

Agency overview
- Type: Educational Policy
- Headquarters: Salem, Oregon
- Agency executive: Iris Bell, Director, Youth Development Division
- Website: oregonyouthdevelopmentcouncil.org

The Oregon Youth Development Division is an agency of the government of the U.S. state of Oregon. It was established by the state legislature in 2013 via HB 3231, and has statutory responsibility under Oregon Revised Statutes (ORS) § 417.852 to "ensure that services are provided to school-age children through youth 20 years of age in a manner that supports educational success, focuses on crime prevention, reduces high risk behaviors and is integrated, measurable and accountable".

The Youth Development Division provides research and resources that support and staff the Youth Development Council (YDC), which meets quarterly. The Division also supports the YDC Youth Prevention/Intervention Committee, and the YDC Juvenile Justice Committee.

The Council has statutory authority under § 417.855 to "allocate funds available to support the local high-risk juvenile crime prevention plans to counties based on the youth population age 18 or younger in those counties".
