= Oregon Medical Insurance Pool =

US health insurcance program

The Oregon Medical Insurance Pool (OMIP), instituted in 1987, is designed to provide medical insurance coverage for residents of the state of Oregon with pre-existing conditions (i.e. HIV/AIDS, diabetes, etc.) who do not already have private insurance. OMIP is administered by Oregon's Office of Private Health Partnerships through Blue Cross/Blue Shield. It functions similarly to other private insurance.

== Ryan White CARE Act ==
HIV/AIDS clients of OMIP are able to receive needed assistance through the federally sponsored Ryan White CARE Act. CAREAssist, Oregon's AIDS Drug Assistance Program, is funded the federal Ryan White CARE program. CAREAssist pays insurance premiums and medical services/prescription co-pays for individuals in need who are infected with HIV/AIDS.

== Impact of federal legislation ==
Due to the enactment of the Patient Protection and Affordable Care Act as federal law in 2010, as of January 1, 2014, insurers will no longer be permitted to charge higher rates or discriminate against those individuals who have a pre-existing condition. This will effectively end the need for OMIP.
