= Oregon Legislative Counsel =

The Office of the Oregon Legislative Counsel is a government agency in the U.S. state of Oregon.

== Establishment ==
The office was established in 1953, primarily to offer legal services to the members and committees of the Oregon Legislative Assembly.

== Purpose ==
The office drafts legislation, conducts legal research, writes opinions, compiles and publishes session laws and the Oregon Revised Statutes, and reviews administrative rules submitted by agencies of the executive branch of the government of Oregon. It also assists the Oregon Law Commission in revising, reforming, and improving the law.

The Legislative Counsel Committee, composed of members of both the Oregon State Senate and the Oregon House of Representatives, oversees the office. Dexter Johnson is the current Legislative Counsel, serving as the chief executive of the office.
