= Oregon Water Resources Department =

The Oregon Water Resources Department (WRD) is the chief regulatory agency of the government of the U.S. state of Oregon responsible for management of all surface and ground water in the state, which by statute belongs to the public. The department’s primary activities include protection of existing water rights, facilitation of voluntary streamflow restoration, public education about the state’s water resources, collection and dissemination of water resource data, and facilitation of water supply solutions.

== History ==
Following unsuccessful attempts at water rights management as early as 1897, and inability to adequately implement the 1894 federal Carey act, the Oregon Legislative Assembly established the office of State Engineer in 1905. The Water Act of 1909 dedicated all ground and surface waters to the public and a comprehensive code of water laws were adopted. Over the years, a number of boards, agencies and bureaus were established, specifically or as part of a broader mandate, to address particular water supply related issues ranging from the Desert Lands Board to the Willamette Basin Commission.

In 1987, the present-day Water Resources Department was created to enable a more comprehensive and coordinated approach to water policy.

In April 2015, the city of Cascade Locks and the Oregon Department of Fish and Wildlife using water for a salmon hatchery, applied with the Oregon Water Resources Department to permanently trade their water rights to Nestle, which does not require a public-interest review. Nestle approached them in 2008 and they had been considering to trade their well water with Oregon's Oxbow Springs water, and to sell the spring water to Nestlé. The plan has been criticized by legislators and 80,000 citizens. The 250,000-square-foot, $50 million Nestle bottling plant in Cascade Locks with an unemployment rate of 18.8 percent would have 50 employees and would increase property-tax collections by 67 percent.
