= Oregon Higher Education Coordinating Commission =

Volunteer panel to advise the state government on higher education policy decisions

Higher Education Coordinating Commission

Agency overview
- Formed: 2011; 15 years ago
- Preceding agencies: Oregon University System; Oregon State Board of Higher Education
- Type: Educational Policy
- Headquarters: 3225 25th Street SE, 3^{rd} Floor; Salem, OR 97302; 44.9394°N 123.0290°W
- Agency executive: Ben Cannon
- Website: www.oregon.gov/highered
- Headquarters location in Oregon

The Oregon Higher Education Coordinating Commission is a volunteer state board established in 2011 in the U.S. state of Oregon, with responsibilities for advising the governor, the legislature and the Chief Education Office on statewide postsecondary education policies and funding. The fifteen-member commission has authorities for "development of biennial budget recommendations for public postsecondary education in Oregon, making funding allocations to Oregon's public community colleges and public universities, approving new academic programs for the public institutions, allocating Oregon Opportunity Grants (state need-based student aid), authorizing degrees that are proposed by private and out-of-state (distance) providers, licensing private career and trade schools, overseeing programs for veterans, and additional legislative directives".

== History ==
Prior to 2012, multiple state agencies and offices had provided statutory regulation and authorization of colleges and universities in Oregon, including the Superintendent of Public Instruction, the Oregon University System, the State Board of Higher Education, the Department of Community Colleges and Workforce Development, the Oregon Student Assistance Commission, and the Oregon legislature. With the passage of SB 242 in 2011, the legislature created the Higher Education Coordinating Commission (HECC) to coordinate between community colleges and state universities, but its role, funding, and staffing remained unclear until the 2013 legislative session.

Two pieces of legislation in 2013, SB 270 and HB 3120, provided an extensive overhaul and reconfiguration of educational committees, commissions, boards, and agencies in Oregon. SB 270 provided for independent boards for universities that had previously been governed by the State Board of Education, and HB 3120 reconfigured the HECC, vesting it with additional state policy and budgetary authority for higher education in Oregon. One observer noted that Oregon postsecondary education had seen "more policy changes in the last few years than it has in the past 50".

== Agency structure ==
The commission's Office of the Executive Director, Policy, and Communications is in charge of "the central executive role of the agency, as well as communications, legislative affairs, human resources, policy initiatives, and other roles for the integrated agency". That office oversees six other state offices, including two that were renamed: the Office of Student Access and Completion (formerly Oregon Student Access Commission) and the Office of Community Colleges and Workforce Development (formerly Department of Community Colleges and Workforce Development). Other offices reporting to the executive director include the Office of Academic Policy and Authorization, the Office of Postsecondary Finance and Capital, the Office of Workforce Investments, the Office of Research and Data, and the Office of Operations.
