= Oregon Revised Statutes =

Laws of the state

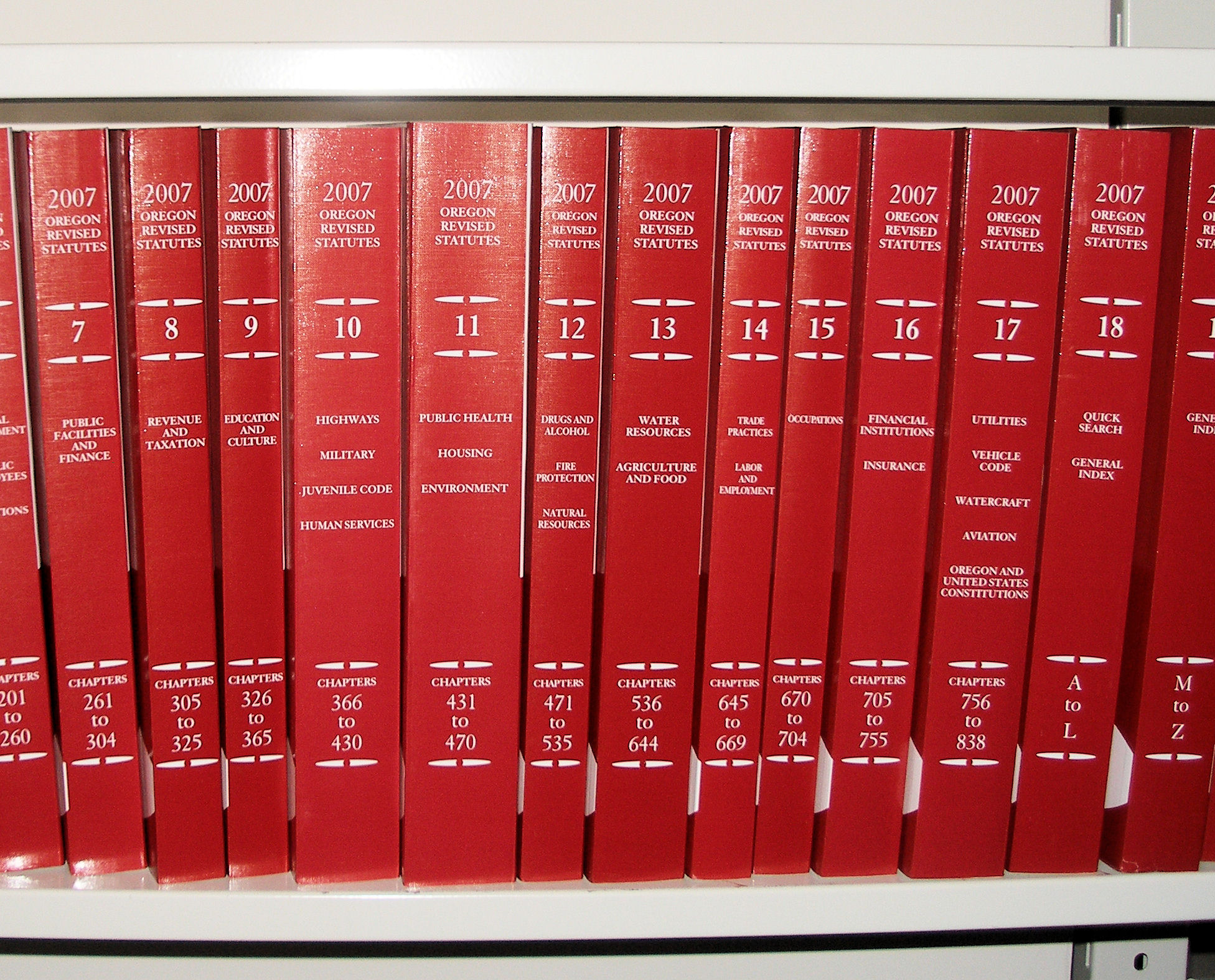
Volumes of the Oregon Revised Statutes at a law library

The Oregon Revised Statutes (abbreviated ORS or Or. Rev. Stat.) is the codified body of statutory law governing the U.S. state of Oregon, as enacted by the Oregon Legislative Assembly, and occasionally by citizen initiative. The statutes are subordinate to the Oregon Constitution.

The Office of the Legislative Counsel prepares and publishes the softcover multi-volume Oregon Revised Statutes every two years, after each biennial legislative session.

The Oregon Legislature created the Oregon Revised Statutes by recodifying the previous code, which was called the Oregon Compiled Laws Annotated (1940). See 1953 Or. Laws c. 3. The first Oregon Revised Statutes was published in 1953. Replacement parts were published biennially from 1955 to 1987 in odd years. Pages for this set were printed on yellow paper housed in huge, gray looseleaf binders. The first softcover edition of the Oregon Revised Statutes was published in 1989. The 2009 edition requires 21 volumes.

The codes which preceded the ORS are Deady's General Laws of Oregon (1845–1864), Deady and Lane's General Laws of Oregon (1843–1872), Hill's Annotated Laws of Oregon (1887), Hill's Annotated Laws of Oregon (2d ed. 1892), Bellinger and Cotton's Annotated Codes and Statutes of Oregon (1902), Lord's Oregon Laws (1910), Oregon Laws (Olson’s) (1920), Oregon Code Annotated (1930), and Oregon Compiled Laws Annotated (1940).

== See also ==
- List of Oregon ballot measures
- Oregon Administrative Rules
