= State government =

Government of a country subdivision in a federal form of government

A state government is the government that controls a subdivision of a country in a federal form of government, which shares political power with the federal or national government. A state government may have some level of political autonomy, or be subject to the direct control of the federal government. This relationship may be defined by a constitution.

The reference to "state" denotes country subdivisions that are officially or widely known as "states", and should not be confused with a "sovereign state". Most federations designate their federal units "state" or the equivalent term in the local language; however, in some federations, other designations are used such as Oblast or Republic. Some federations are asymmetric, designating greater powers to some federal units than others.

Provinces are usually divisions of unitary states but occasionally the designation is also given to the federal units such as the Provinces of Argentina or Canada. Their governments, which are also provincial governments, are not the subject of this article. Many people confuse the state with city governments, and while a small ticket or small crime will be overlooked by the federal government and handled by the state or city government, that are not the same.

== Australia ==
The Commonwealth of Australia is a federal nation with six states (and three mainland territories). Section 51 of the Australian Constitution sets out the division of legislative power between the states and the Commonwealth (federal) government. The Commonwealth government is given a variety of legislative powers, including control of foreign policy, taxation (although this cannot discriminate between states or parts of states), and regulation of interstate commerce and corporations. Since the original ratification of the constitution, the High Court of Australia has settled a number of disputes concerning the extent of the Commonwealth's legislative powers, some of which have been controversial and extensively criticised; these included a dispute in 1982 over whether the Commonwealth was entitled to designate land for national heritage purposes under United Nations agreements, as well as numerous disputes over the extent of the Commonwealth's power over trade union and industrial relations legislation.

One difference between the Australian and United States models of federalism is that, in Australia, the Commonwealth Parliament has explicit constitutional power over marriage legislation; this has been a focal point for recent controversies over same-sex marriage.

=== Government structure ===
Each state of Australia has a governor, who represents the King of Australia (currently Charles III) and performs the ceremonial duties of a head of state. Unlike the Canadian lieutenant-governors, a state governor is appointed by the Monarch on the advice of the state government, not the federal government. Every state also has a parliament; most states have a bicameral parliament, except for Queensland, where the upper chamber (the Legislative Council) was abolished in 1922. Australian states have a Westminster system of parliamentary government; the head of government, known in each state as a Premier, is drawn from the state parliament.

== Austria ==
In Austria, a Landtag (state parliament) elects a Landeshauptmann, who is not only the chairman of a state government but also the representative of the federal government and responsible for the enforcement of federal legislation.

== Germany ==
Germany has sixteen federal states (Bundesländer) with their own governments (Landesregierung).

== India ==
In India, state governments are the governments ruling over the country's 28 states and two of its eight union territories (Delhi and Puducherry). Under the Constitution of India, the executive power of a state is vested in its Governor; however, the real executive power rests with a Council of Ministers, headed by a Chief Minister. The legislative structure consists of a directly-elected legislative assembly and, in the case of 6 states, an indirectly-elected legislative council. The judicial setup consists of the state's high court and the district courts subordinate to it.

== Mexico ==
Mexico also has states.

== Nigeria ==
In Nigeria, States are constituent political entities of which there are currently 36. States have an elected Governor and legislature and broad powers in some areas. Powers not given to the states belong to the federal government under the Constitution of Nigeria.

== Pakistan ==
In Pakistan, the Provinces of Pakistan are the federal units. There are currently four.

The Provincial Governments are each headed formally by a Provincial Governor but for practical purposes power is exercised by the Chief Minister, in a parliamentary system similar to that of the Federal government of Pakistan .

== South Africa ==
South Africa is usually considered a unitary state but its government system possesses a strong similarity to a federal one. The Constitution of South Africa does not describe the state as federal or unitary.

South Africa is divided into nine provinces which have their own elected governments. Chapter Six of the Constitution of South Africa describes the division of power between the national government and the provincial governments, listing those "functional areas" of government that are exclusively reserved to the provincial governments and those where both levels of government have concurrent powers; the remaining areas not listed are reserved to the national government. In areas where both levels have concurrent powers there is a complex set of rules in the event of a conflict between national and provincial legislation. Generally in such a case the provincial legislation prevails, but national legislation may prescribe standards and frameworks for provinces to follow, and may prevent provinces from adversely affecting national interests or the interests of other provinces. The functional areas in which the provincial governments have powers include agriculture, arts and culture, primary and secondary education, the environment and tourism, health, housing, roads and transport, and social welfare.

The provincial governments are structured according to a parliamentary system in which the executive is dependent on and accountable to the legislature. The unicameral provincial legislature is elected by party-list proportional representation, and the legislature in turn elects one of its members as Premier to head the executive. The Premier appoints an Executive Council (a cabinet), consisting of members of the legislature, to administer the various departments of the provincial administration.

== United States ==
The United States is divided into 50 states, which comprise the federated polities. Unlike many other federal systems, the states of the U.S. created the federal government. Under the 10th Amendment to the U.S. Constitution, all governmental powers not granted to the Federal government of the United States nor prohibited by it to the States, are reserved to the States respectively, making the United States a decentralized federation. Federal law generally takes preference over State law when the two conflict, due to a number of constitutional clauses and judicial precedents.

In most states, governors are the directly elected head of state and commander-in-chief of their state's respective military structure. State legislatures exercise legislative authority. In 49 states out of 50 as well as three of the inhabited Territories of the United States (Puerto Rico, Northern Mariana Islands, and American Samoa), the legislature is bicameral, and the houses are commonly, though not exclusively, styled House of Representatives and Senate, although the name of the legislative body as a whole varies between the states (the most common are General Assembly (itself sometimes a term for the lower house of a state legislature) such as in North Carolina, or simply Legislature as in Texas). In Nebraska, United States Virgin Islands and Guam (the latter two being federal territories rather than states) the legislature is unicameral.

The states are sovereign entities in their own right and maintain much control over their internal affairs with issues such as public transport and law enforcement generally being the domain of state governments (although the Federal government often works with states in these areas). Large portions of the welfare state in the United States are administered by the states as well, which means that levels of social services vary from state to state. This has sometimes been controversial, such as in the case of Medicaid expansion.

There are also several territories, the most notable of which is Puerto Rico. Puerto Rico is treated in a manner similar to a state in many areas, but in others is quite different. Most notably, it does not have representation in the United States Congress other than its non-voting Resident Commissioner of Puerto Rico. However, it does enjoy more autonomy in taxation and some other areas than the states, and thus is commonly classified as a sort of autonomous region for the Puerto Rican people, who are culturally distinct from the Americans on the mainland. There exists a debate as to the future status of the territory, with proposals including full statehood, maintenance of the autonomous territory status, or some form of independence (either retaining limited reliance upon the United States or full independence with no special relationship).

== See also ==
- Federated state
- Confederated state
- Associated state
- List of U.S. state legislatures
