= Government of Oregon =

Government of the U.S. state of Oregon

- Great Seal of the State of Oregon
- Polity type: Sub-national administrative division (federated state)
- Part of: United States of America
- Constitution: Constitution of Oregon

Legislative branch
- Name: Legislature
- Type: Bicameral
- Meeting place: Oregon State Capitol
- Upper house
- Name: Senate
- Presiding officer: Rob Wagner, President
- Lower house
- Name: House of Representatives
- Presiding officer: Julie Fahey, Speaker

Executive branch
- Head of state and government
- Title: Governor
- Currently: Tina Kotek
- Appointer: Election
- Cabinet
- Leader: Governor
- Headquarters: Oregon State Capitol

Judicial branch
- Name: Judiciary of Oregon
- Courts: Courts of Oregon
- Supreme Court of Oregon
- Chief judge: Meagan Flynn
- Seat: Supreme Court Building, Salem

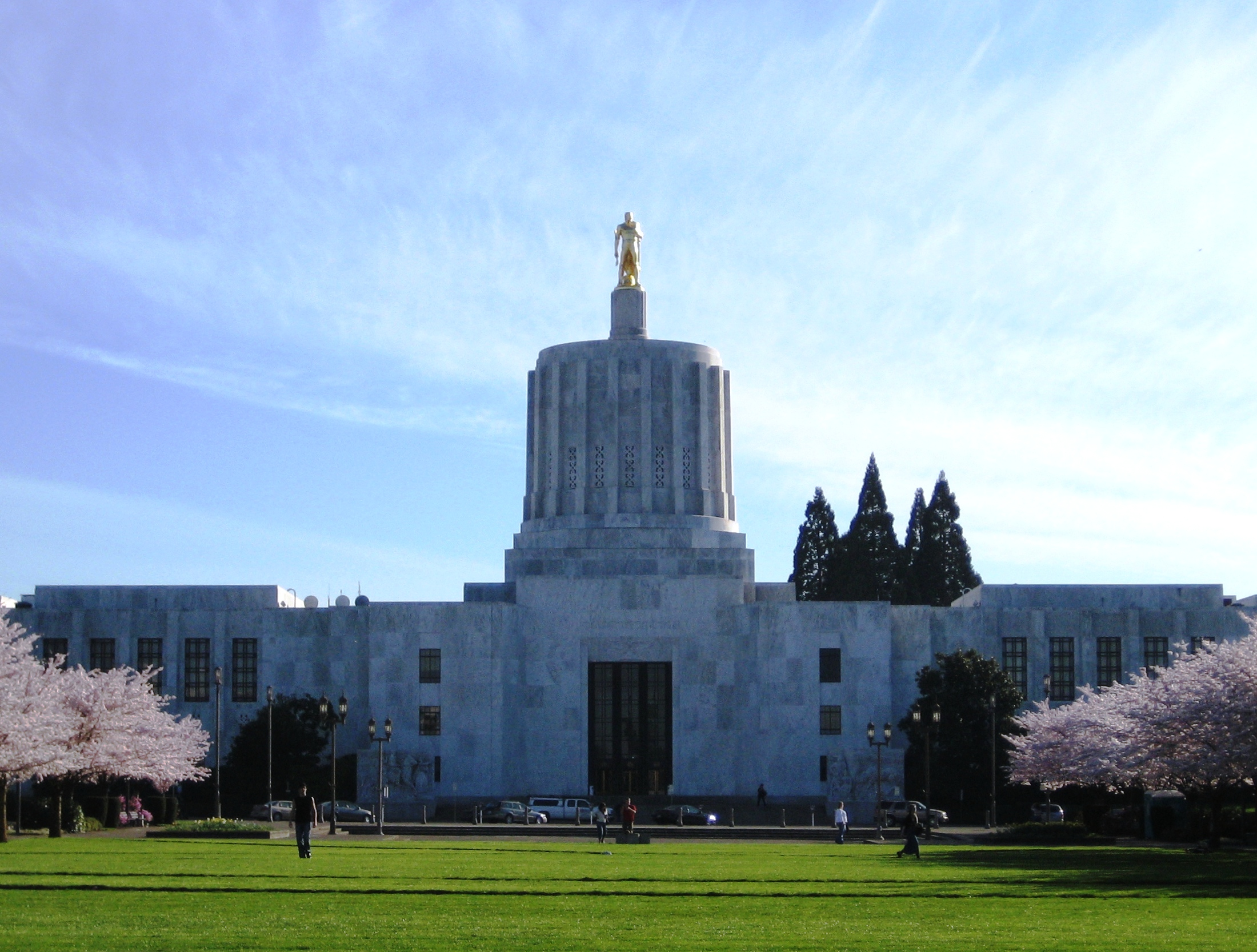
Oregon Capitol building

The government of the U.S. state of Oregon, as prescribed by the Oregon Constitution, is composed of three government branches: the executive, the legislative, and the judicial. These branches operate in a manner similar to that of the federal government of the United States.

Oregon also has a system of commissions, wherein private citizens are appointed by the governor and confirmed by the Senate; these commissions have the authority to hire and fire the heads of the agencies they govern, and must confirm changes to the permanent rules governing those agencies.

== Constitution ==
In 1857, leaders of the Oregon Territory gathered at the Oregon Constitutional Convention and drafted a constitution for Oregon. On November 9, 1857, Oregon voters approved its first constitution that then became effective upon statehood on February 14, 1859. The constitution was unchanged for the remainder of the 19th century, but has been amended numerous times since 1902. The changes include the introduction of a direct legislation system, which enabled numerous popular decisions via initiative, both to the constitution and to the Oregon Revised Statutes.

The current document contains eighteen sections, beginning with a bill of rights. Oregon's bill of rights contains most of the rights and privileges granted in the United States Bill of Rights and the main text of the United States Constitution. The remainder of the Oregon Constitution outlines the divisions of power within the state government, times of elections, designating the state capitol, the state boundaries. The original implementation provisions included a vote excluding African-Americans from the state.

== Executive branch ==
Elected Executive Officers of Oregon

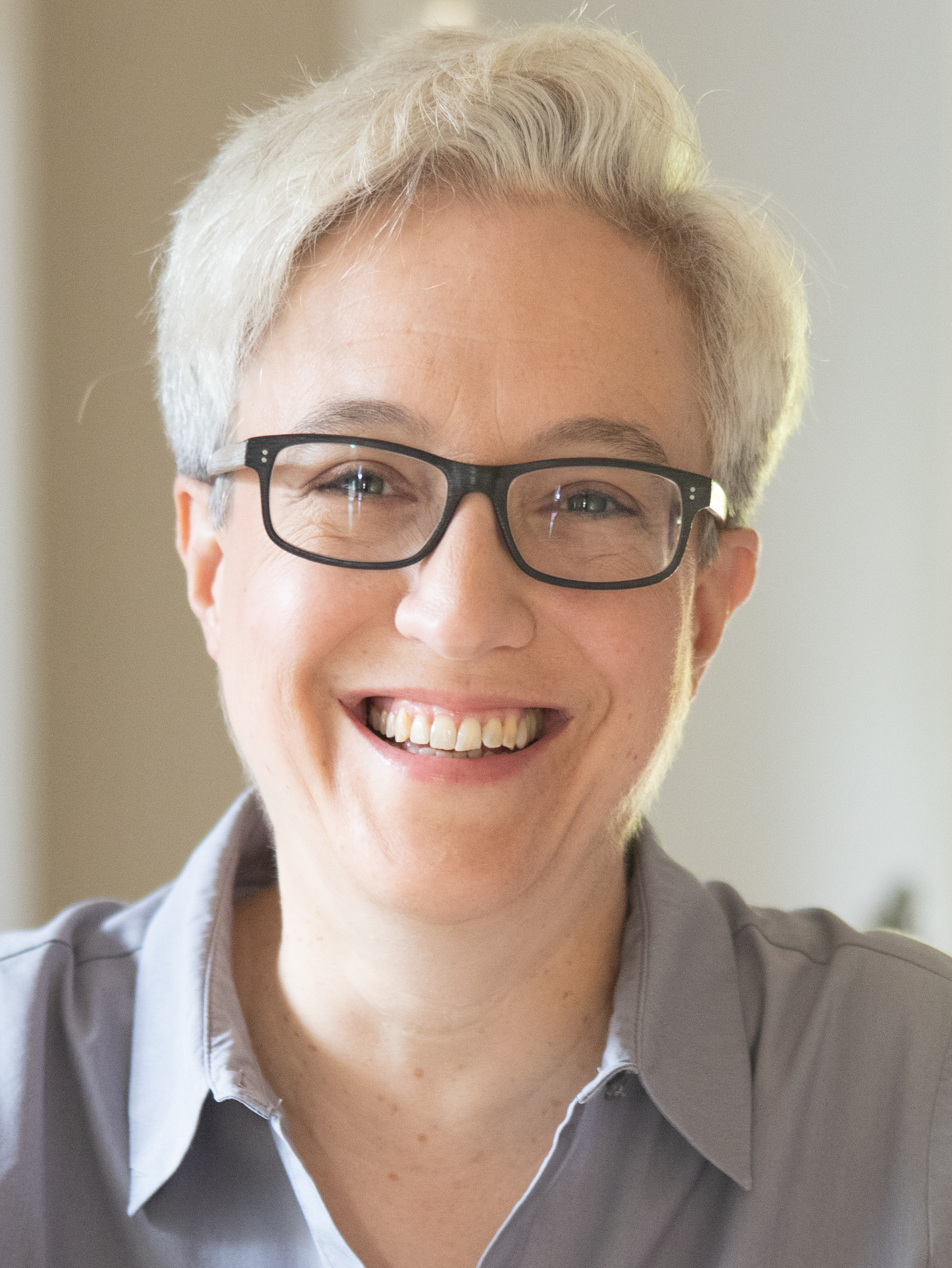
Tina Kotek (D)
Governor

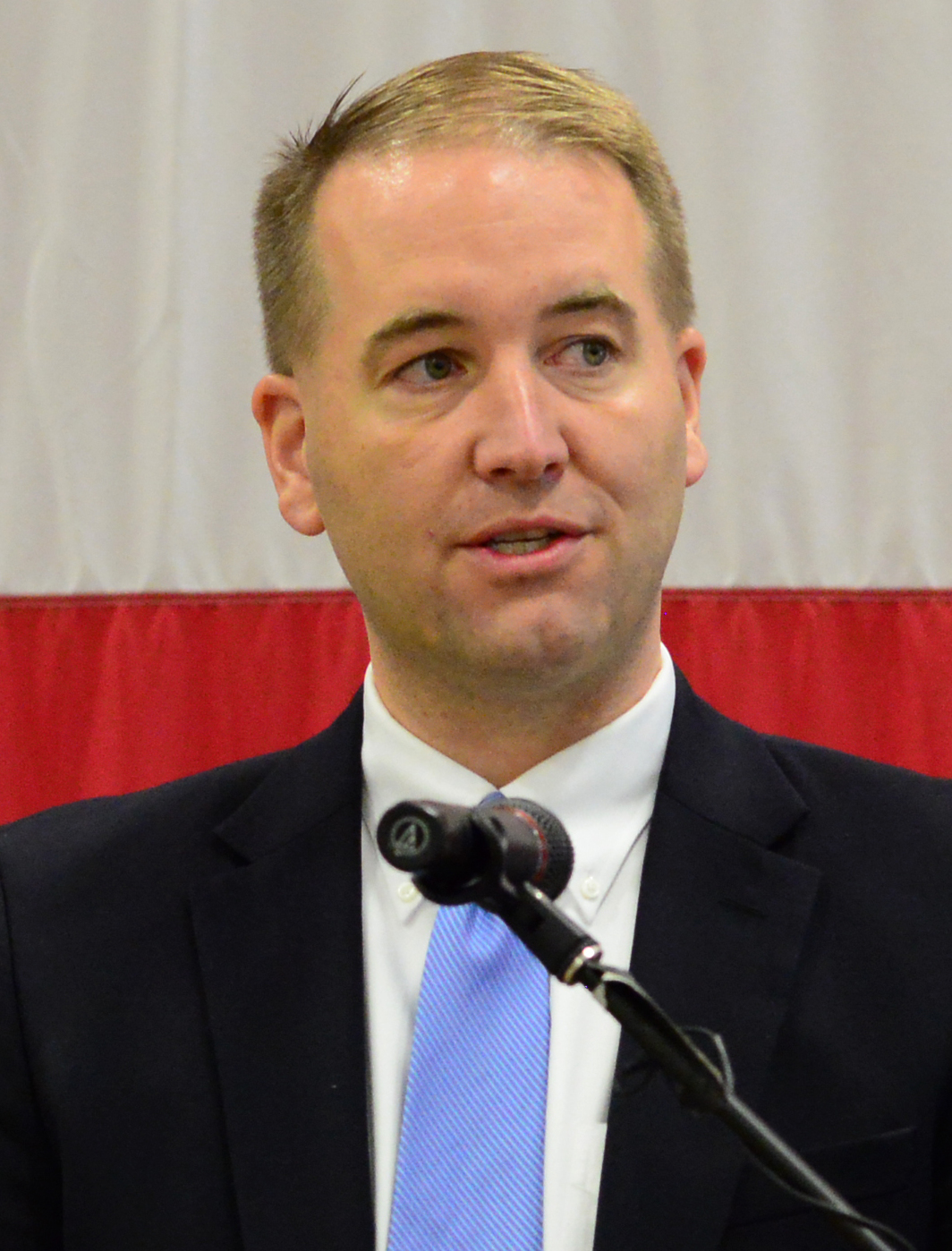
Tobias Read (D)
Secretary of State

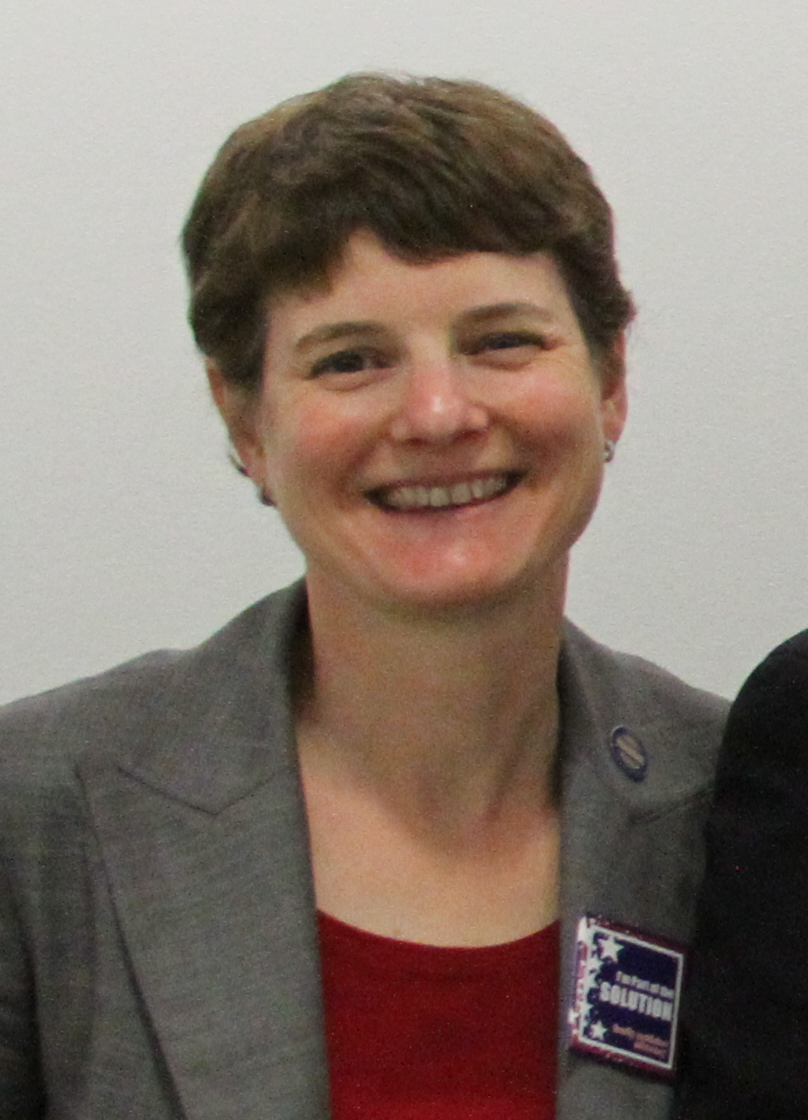
Elizabeth Steiner (D)
Treasurer

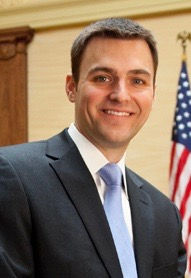
Dan Rayfield (D)
Attorney General

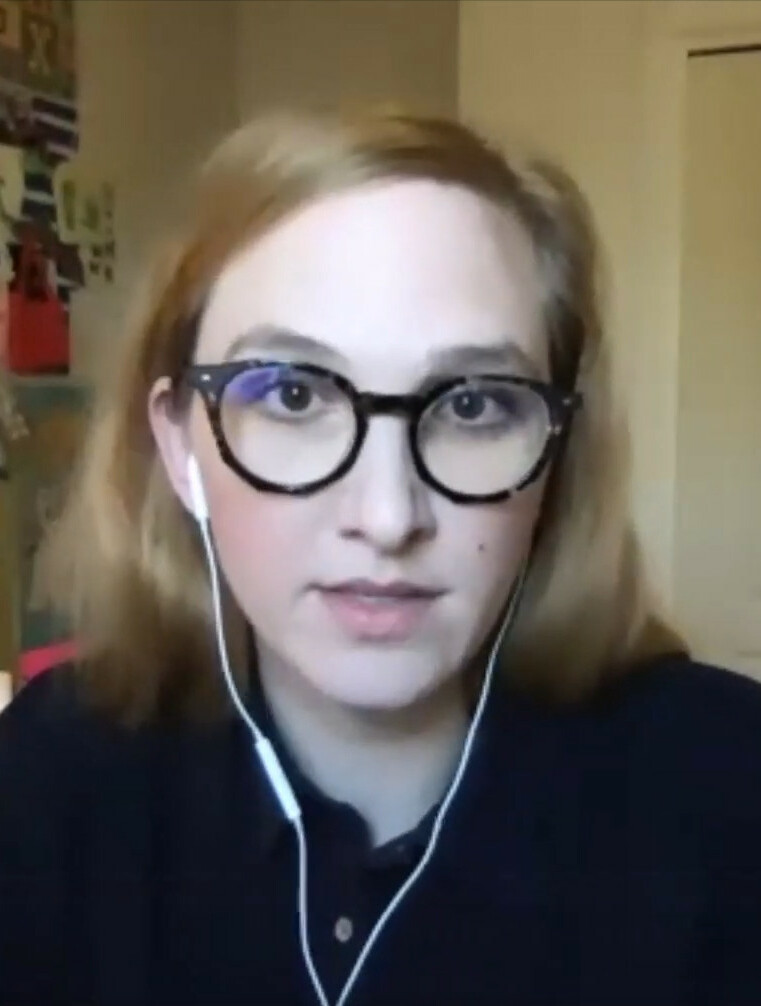
Christina Stephenson (D)
Commissioner of Labor
- Governor of Oregon
- Oregon Secretary of State
  - Archives Division
  - Oregon Sustainability Board (The Secretary of State is the board chair)
- Oregon State Treasurer
- Oregon Attorney General
  - Oregon Department of Justice
- Oregon Commissioner of Labor and Industries
- Oregon Superintendent of Public Instruction (1872–2012)
- Oregon Department of State Lands (governed by the State Land Board, which is composed of the Governor, Secretary of State, and Treasurer)

== Legislative branch ==
- Oregon Legislative Assembly
  - Oregon House of Representatives
  - Oregon State Senate

== Judicial branch ==
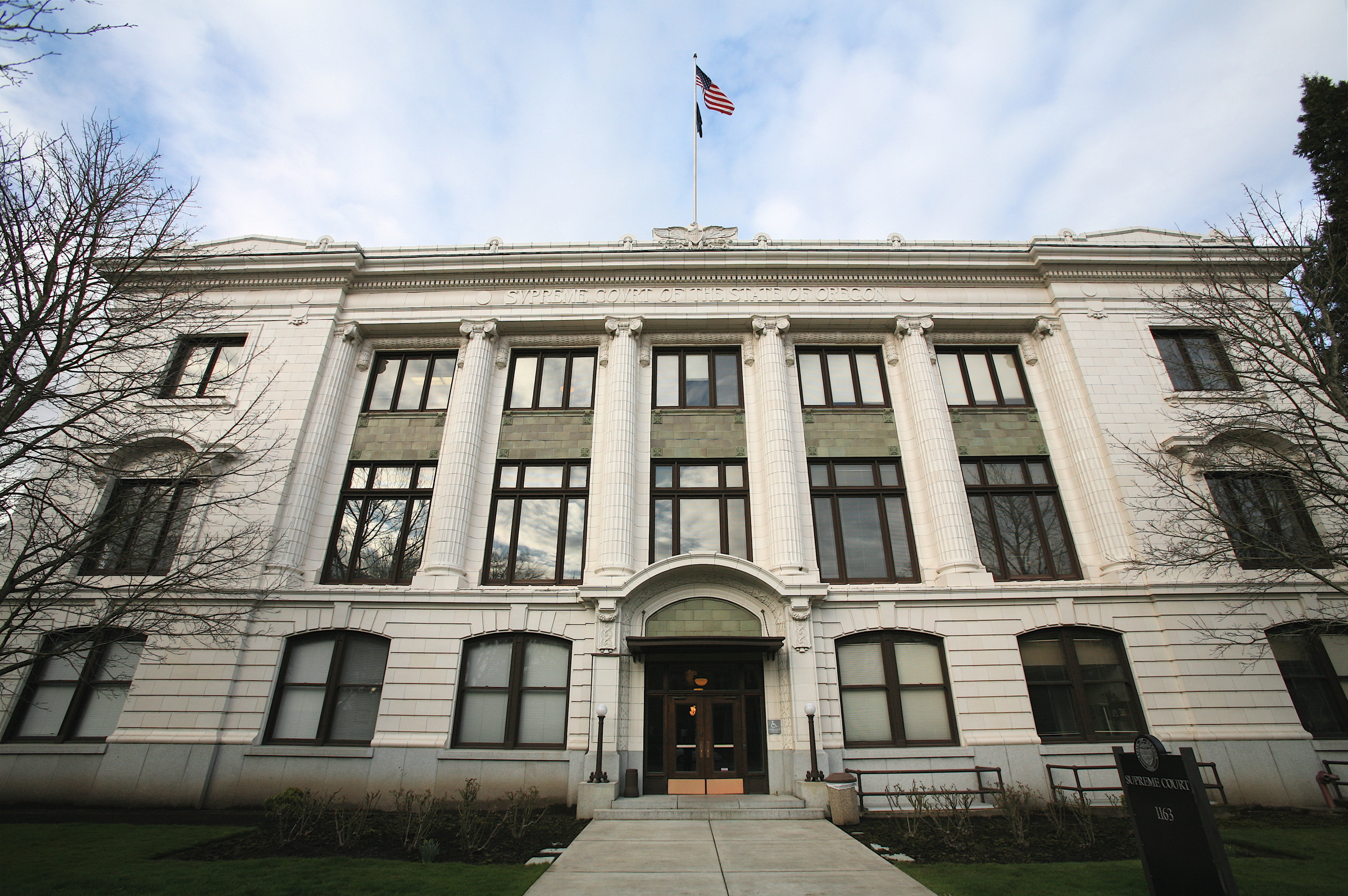
The Oregon Supreme Court Building

Oregon's state level judicial branch of government consists of the Oregon Judicial Department (OJD) which operates four state run court systems. Two of those courts are primarily trial level courts, while the other two are primarily courts of appeal. The chief executive of the OJD is the Chief Justice of the Oregon Supreme Court. At the local level are some justice courts, municipal courts, and county courts.

The Oregon Supreme Court is located in the Oregon Supreme Court Building in Salem. It consists of seven judges that are elected to six-year terms in statewide popular elections, with vacancies filled by appointment by the Governor of Oregon. As the highest court in the state, it is the final authority on state law and its decisions can only be overturned by the United States Supreme Court. The court is headed by the Chief Justice, who is elected to a six-year term by fellow justices.

Oregon's Court of Appeals is an intermediate court of appeals hearing appeals from decisions of both civil and criminal cases decided at the trial court level. This court has ten judges that in most cases sit in three judge panels to determine the outcome of appeals. The judges are also elected statewide to six-year terms, with vacancies filed by appointment of the governor. The Oregon Supreme Court's Chief Justice appoints one of the ten judges to serve as Chief Judge, who acts as the head of the Court of Appeals. Appeals from decisions of this court go to the Oregon Supreme Court.

The OJD operates the Oregon Circuit Courts, which are 27 trial level court districts across the state that receive both civil and criminal court cases. As of January 2007, the courts had 173 judges spread over the 27 districts that cover the state's 36 circuit courts. The majority of appeals from the Circuit Courts go to the Oregon Court of Appeals. Some limited cases go directly to the Oregon Supreme Court if appealed from at the trial court level.

Cases involving issues of taxation are handled primarily through the Oregon Tax Court. This court has two divisions, with the Magistrate Division being an informal process appearing more like alternative dispute resolution. The Regular Division is a formal court headed by a single Tax Court judge elected to six-year terms on a statewide basis. Appeals from the Magistrate Division go to the Regular Division, and appeals from decisions of this court go directly to the Oregon Supreme Court.

== State agencies ==
- Oregon Office of Degree Authorization
- Oregon Department of Fish and Wildlife
- Oregon State Library
- Oregon Liquor and Cannabis Commission
- Oregon Lottery
- Oregon Parks and Recreation
  - State Fair and Exposition Center
- Oregon State Police
- Oregon Department of Transportation
- Oregon Higher Education Coordinating Commission
- Oregon Office of University Coordination

=== Former state agencies ===
- Oregon State Board of Higher Education (1929–2015)
- Oregon University System (1932–2015)
- Oregon Chief Education Office (2014–2019)

== See also ==
- Government of Portland, Oregon
