= Courts of Oregon =

List of courts in Oregon

Courts of Oregon include:

State courts of Oregon

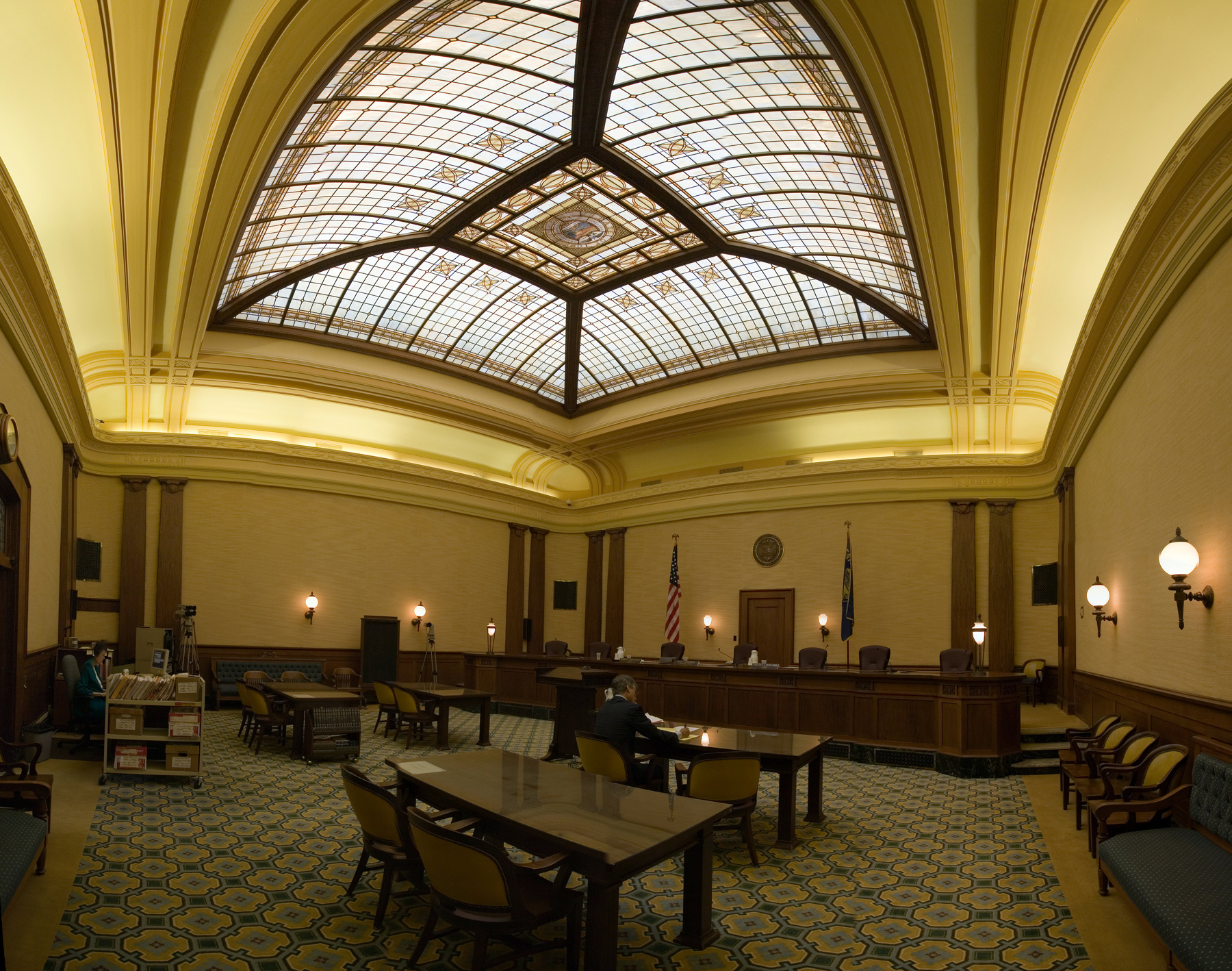
Courtroom of the Oregon Supreme Court.

- Oregon Supreme Court
  - Oregon Court of Appeals
    - Oregon Circuit Courts (36 courts, one for each county, administratively divided between 27 judicial districts)
    - Oregon Justice Courts
    - Oregon Municipal Courts
    - Oregon County Courts
  - Oregon Tax Court

Federal courts located in Oregon

- United States District Court for the District of Oregon

== See also ==
- Oregon Department of Justice
- Oregon Judicial Department
