= Oregon Judicial Department =

Agency overview
- Formed: 1981
- Preceding agencies: Oregon Supreme Court; Oregon Court of Appeals
- Jurisdiction: Oregon
- Headquarters: Oregon Supreme Court Building; Salem, Oregon
- Minister responsible: Meagan Flynn, Chief Justice
- Agency executive: Nancy Cozine, State Court Administrator
- Website: courts.oregon.gov

The Oregon Judicial Department (OJD) is the judicial branch of government of the state of Oregon in the United States. The chief executive of the branch is the Chief Justice of the Oregon Supreme Court. Oregon’s judiciary consists primarily of four different courts: the Oregon Supreme Court, the Oregon Tax Court, the Oregon Court of Appeals, and the Oregon circuit courts. Additionally, the OJD includes the Council on Court Procedures, the Oregon State Bar, Commission on Judicial Fitness and Disability, and the Public Defense Services Commission. Employees of the court are the largest non-union group among state workers.

== Courts ==
Oregon’s 1981 Legislature enacted legislation that unified the state courts into the Oregon Judicial Department. The district, circuit, tax, and both appellate courts were combined beginning in 1983. In 1997, the Legislature then combined the district and circuit courts, and in 1998 added a Magistrate Division to the Tax Court.

Four courts make up Oregon’s state court system. The highest court is the Oregon Supreme Court, which hears some select direct appeals, but hears appeals mainly from the Oregon Tax and the Oregon Court of Appeals. The two divisions of the Tax Court provide trial level and appellate level court proceedings with appeals going directly to the Oregon Supreme Court. The Oregon Circuit Courts are the trial level courts of the state for both criminal and civil proceedings, with the majority of appeals going to the Oregon Court of Appeals. The Court of Appeals handle appeals from the Circuit Courts and county courts, with appeals of their decisions going to the Oregon Supreme Court.

=== Supreme Court ===
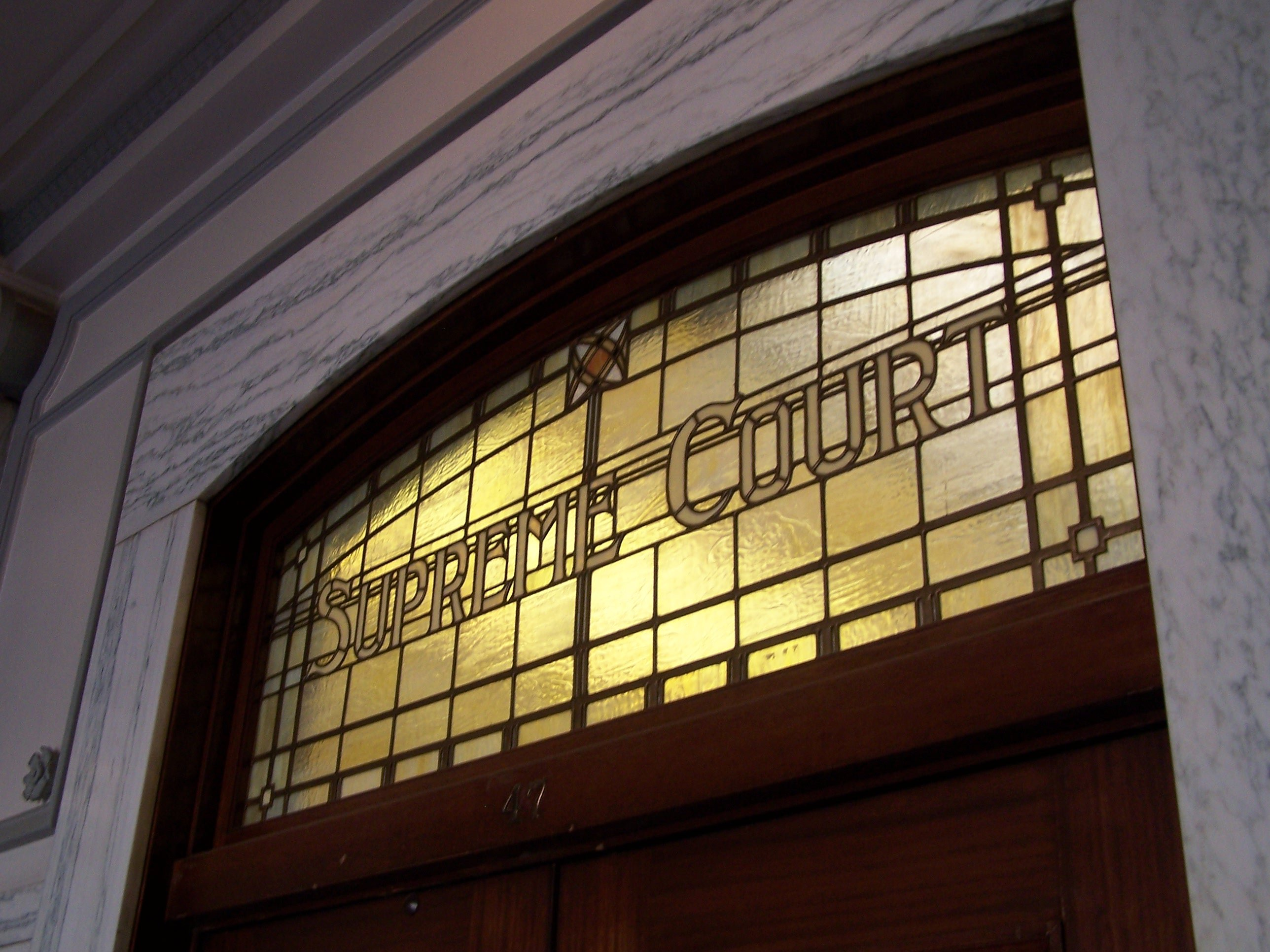
Stained glass above the courtroom entrance

Oregon’s highest state court is the Oregon Supreme Court. The court has seven justices elected statewide to six-year terms. These justices then elect one member to serve a six-year term as Chief Justice. The court hears appeals from the lower state courts, as well as some unique issues such as electoral districting and ballot measure titling. Appeals from the court’s decisions can only go to the United States Supreme Court.

=== Court of Appeals ===
The Oregon Court of Appeals is the state intermediate appellate court in Oregon. With some exceptions, it has jurisdiction to hear all civil and criminal appeals from circuit courts, and to review actions of most state administrative agencies. The court consists of ten judges elected statewide in nonpartisan elections to six-year terms. Their administrative head is a Chief Judge appointed by the Chief Justice of the state Supreme Court.

=== Tax Court ===
Oregon’s Tax Court has a Magistrate and Regular divisions, with the Magistrate Division consisting of magistrate judges handling cases at the trial level The Regular Division hears appeals from the Magistrate Division. The Tax Court’s jurisdiction includes exclusive jurisdiction regarding facts and legal questions arising from all tax laws within the state of Oregon. An elected Tax Judge serves as the head of the court.

=== Circuit Courts ===
In 1998, the state combined its state District Courts into the Oregon Circuit Courts. These courts are divided into 27 judicial districts across the entire state. The courts are trial level courts with general jurisdiction. Except in six Eastern Oregon counties, the courts have jurisdiction over probate issues, adoptions, guardianship and conservatorships, and juvenile items.

== Other ==
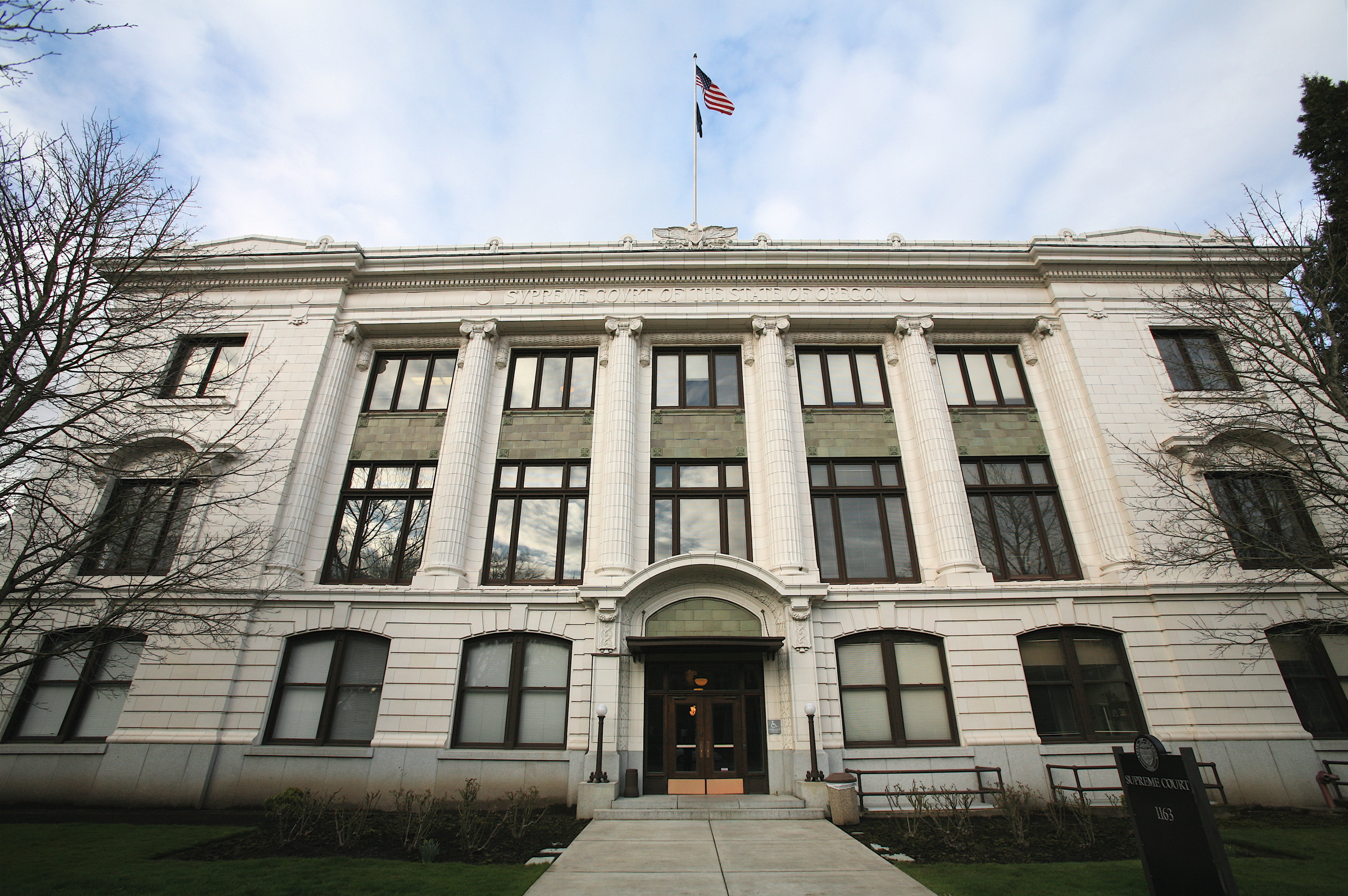
The Oregon Supreme Court Building

The department’s chief operating officer is the State Court Administrator. Housed in the Oregon Supreme Court Building, their role is to assist the Chief Justice of the Supreme Court in supervising and administrating the state courts. Created in 1971, the office also is responsible for keeping a current list of attorneys allowed to practice in the state and coordinating with the Bar for new lawyer admissions.

Other divisions operated by the department include indigent defense, the state bar and rule and procedure making bodies. Oregon’s Public Defense Services Commission provides indigent legal counsel for defendants in Oregon’s court system, including civil and criminal proceedings. The Oregon State Bar regulates practicing attorneys in the state including disciplinary matters. The Council on Court Procedures revises the court rules, and the Commission on Judicial Fitness and Disability investigates complaints made against judges.

== See also ==
- Government of Oregon
- United States District Court for the District of Oregon
- Justice courts
- List of Oregon judges
