= William C. Knighton =

American architect

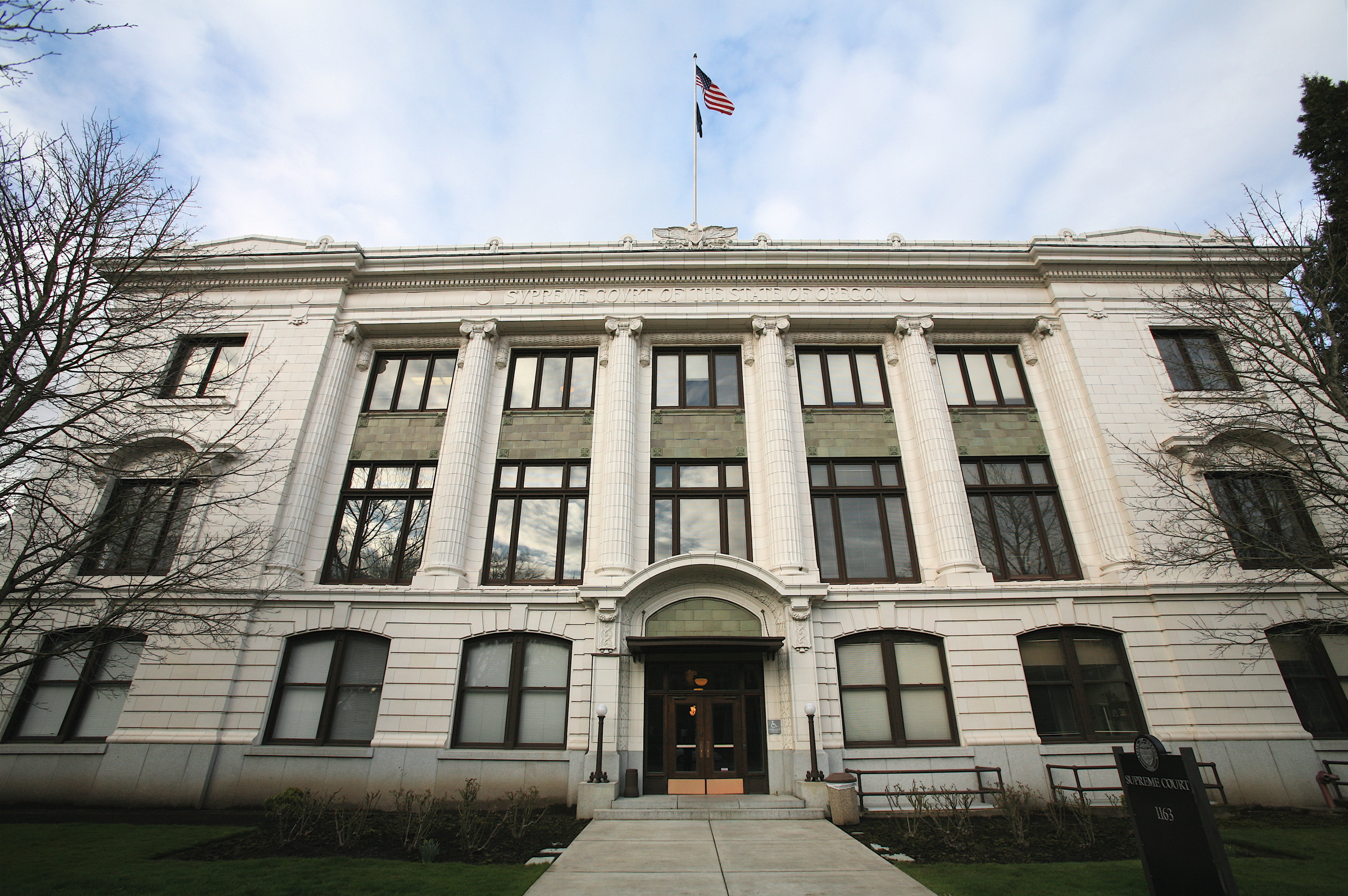
Oregon Supreme Court Building

William Christmas Knighton (December 25, 1867 – March 14, 1938) was an American architect best known for his work in Oregon. Knighton designed the Governor Hotel in Portland, Johnson Hall at the University of Oregon, and the Oregon Supreme Court Building and Deepwood Estate in Salem. He served as Oregon's first state architect from 1911 to 1915, appointed by Governor Oswald West. By 1915, Knighton had designed ninety building projects as state architect. In 1919, Knighton was appointed by Governor Ben Olcott as the first president of the Oregon State Board of Architectural Examiners, a position he held until 1922. In 1920, Knighton was elected the sixth president of the Oregon Chapter of the American Institute of Architects. He remained on the chapter's board of trustees for several years and was chair of the Chapter Legislative Committee into the 1930s.

He born on December 25, 1867, in Indianapolis, Indiana. He came to Salem, Oregon, in 1893 and apprenticed with C.S. McNally. He moved to Alabama in 1895 and returned to Portland, Oregon in 1902.

In 1924 he formed a partnership with Leslie Dillon Howell, during which he designed buildings including Grant High School.

He died in Portland on March 14, 1938.

A number of his works are listed on the National Register of Historic Places.

Works include (with individual or joint attribution):

- Dr. Luke A. Port House (1894), 1116 Mission St., SE, Salem, Oregon (Knighton, William C.), NRHP-listed
- Judge James Watson Hamilton House (1895), 759 S. E. Kane St., Roseburg, Oregon (Knighton, W.C.), NRHP-listed
- Prael, Hegele Building/Maddox Building (1906), 1231 NW Hoyt Street (W.C. Knighton, J.T. Wilding), NRHP-listed as contributing within Portland Thirteenth Avenue Historic District
- Maud and Belle Ainsworth House (1907), 2542 S.W. Hillcrest Dr., Portland (Knighton, William C.), NRHP-listed
- Charles J. and Elsa Schnabel House (1907), 2375 S.W. Park Pl., Portland, (Knighton, William C.), NRHP-listed
- Governor Hotel (1909), 611 SW 10th Ave., Portland (Knighton, William C.), NRHP-listed
- Packard Service Building (1910), 121 NW. Twenty-Third Ave., Portland, (Knighton, William C.), NRHP-listed
- Whitney and Gray Building and Jake's Famous Crawfish Restaurant (1910), 401-409 SW 12th Ave., Portland, (Knighton & Root), NRHP-listed
- Crane Building (c.1910), 710 and 712 NW 14th Avenue, NRHP-listed as contributing within Portland Thirteenth Avenue Historic District
- Joseph Gaston House (1911), 1960 S.W. Sixteenth Ave., Portland, (Knighton, William C.), NRHP-listed
- Trinity Place Apartments (1911), 117 NW. Trinity Pl., Portland, (William C. Knighton/Knighton & Root), NRHP-listed
- Ashland Oregon National Guard Armory (1912–13), 208 Oak St., Ashland, Oregon (Knighton, W.C.), NRHP-listed
- Oregon Supreme Court Building (1913–14), Salem, Oregon
- Roseburg Oregon National Guard Armory (1914), 1034 SE. Oak St., Roseburg, Oregon (Knighton, Wiiliam C.), NRHP-listed
- Johnson Hall (1914–15), E. 13th between University and Kincaid Sts., at the University of Oregon, Eugene, Oregon (Knighton, William C.), NRHP-listed
- Eastern Oregon State Hospital (sometime during 1912–1917), Pendleton, Oregon
- State Boys' Training School (sometime during 1912–1917), Woodburn, Oregon
- Frigidaire Building (1929), 230 E. Burnside, Portland, (Knighton & Howell), NRHP-listed
