= Gadsby Building =

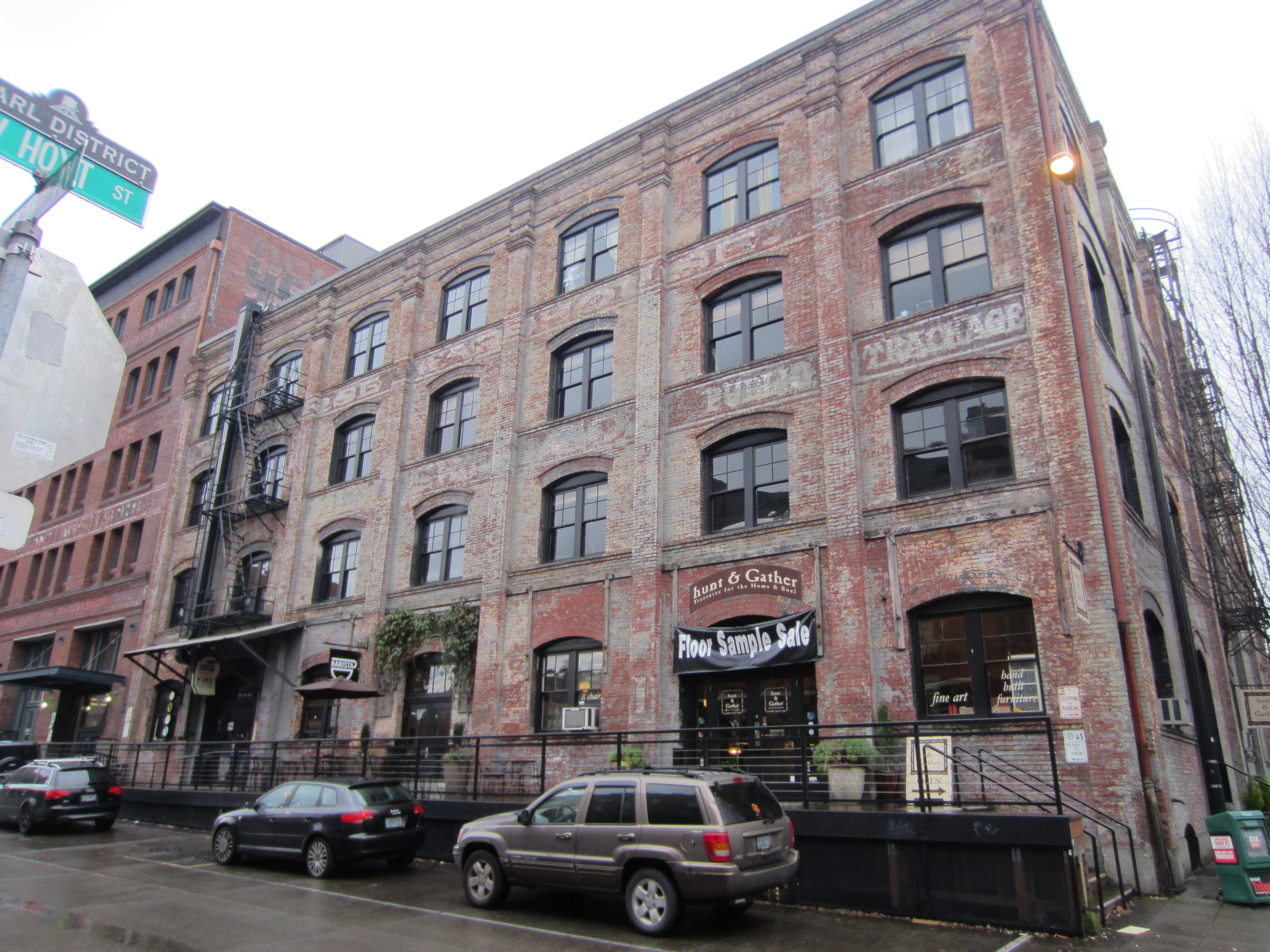
- The building's exterior in 2012
- Interactive map of the Gadsby Building area

General information
- Location: Portland, Oregon, United States
- Coordinates: 45.52696124904022°N 122.68460150205593°W

The Gadsby Building is an historic building in Portland, Oregon. Completed in 1906, the structure is part of the Portland Thirteenth Avenue Historic District, which is listed on the National Register of Historic Places.
