= Trinity Place Apartments =

Historic building in Portland, Oregon, U.S.

- U.S. National Register of Historic Places
- U.S. Historic district – Contributing property
- Portland Historic Landmark
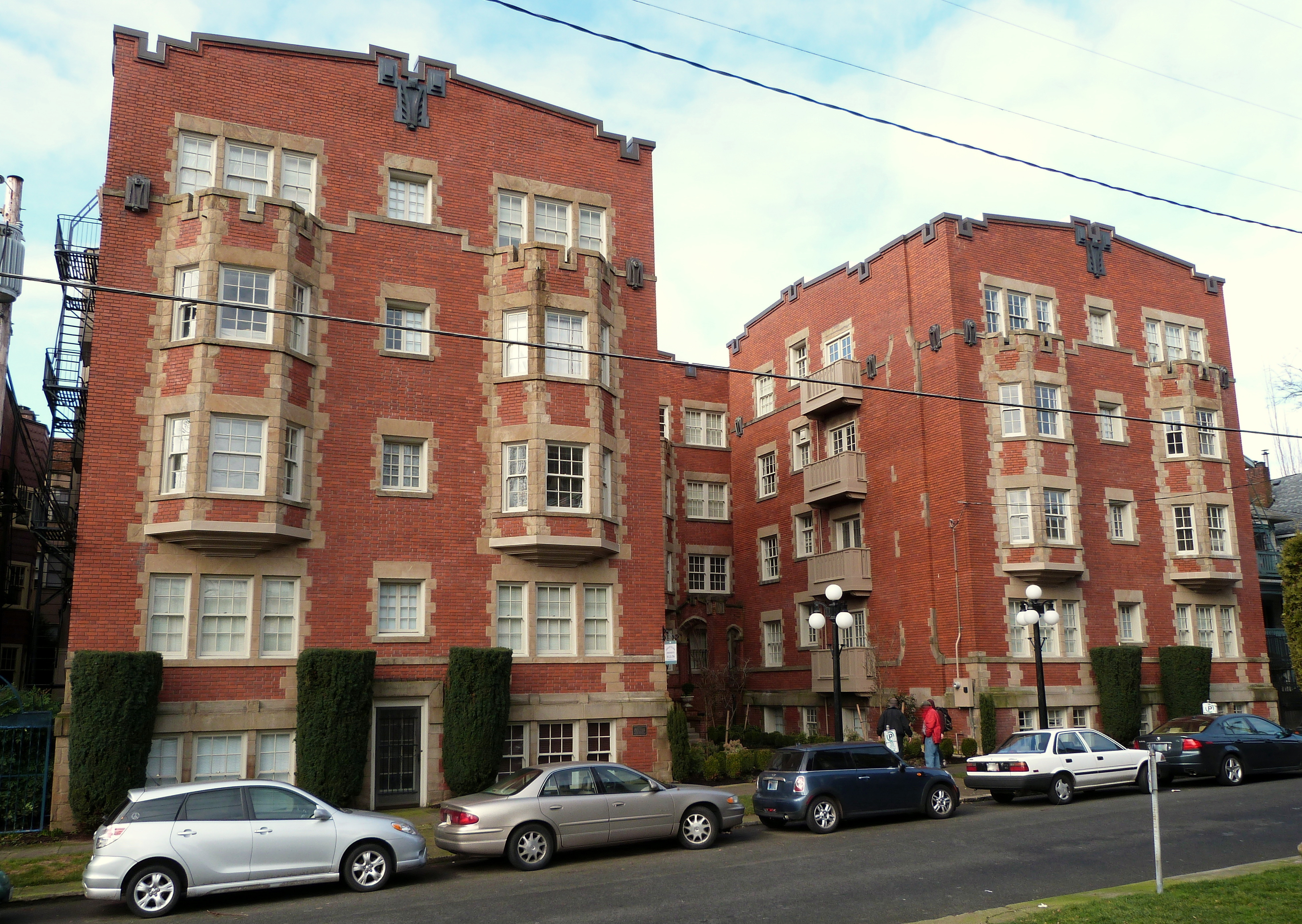
- The building's exterior in 2013

- Location within Portland, Oregon Location within Oregon Location within the United States
- Location: 117 NW Trinity Place; Portland, Oregon
- Coordinates: 45°31′26″N 122°41′30″W
- Built: 1911
- Architect: William C. Knighton; Knighton & Root
- Architectural style: Tudor Revival, Jacobethan
- Part of: Alphabet Historic District (ID00001293)
- NRHP reference No.: 90000294
- Added to NRHP: February 23, 1990

The Trinity Place Apartments, located in northwest Portland, Oregon, is acknowledged by the National Register of Historic Places.

An unreinforced masonry building, placing it at high risk of collapse in a major earthquake, the 46,000-square-foot (4,300 m^{2}) building was given a $1.3 million full seismic retrofit, in phases over a period of a few years, concluding in 2017.

== See also ==
- National Register of Historic Places listings in Northwest Portland, Oregon
