= Roseburg Oregon National Guard Armory =

- U.S. National Register of Historic Places
- U.S. Historic district – Contributing property
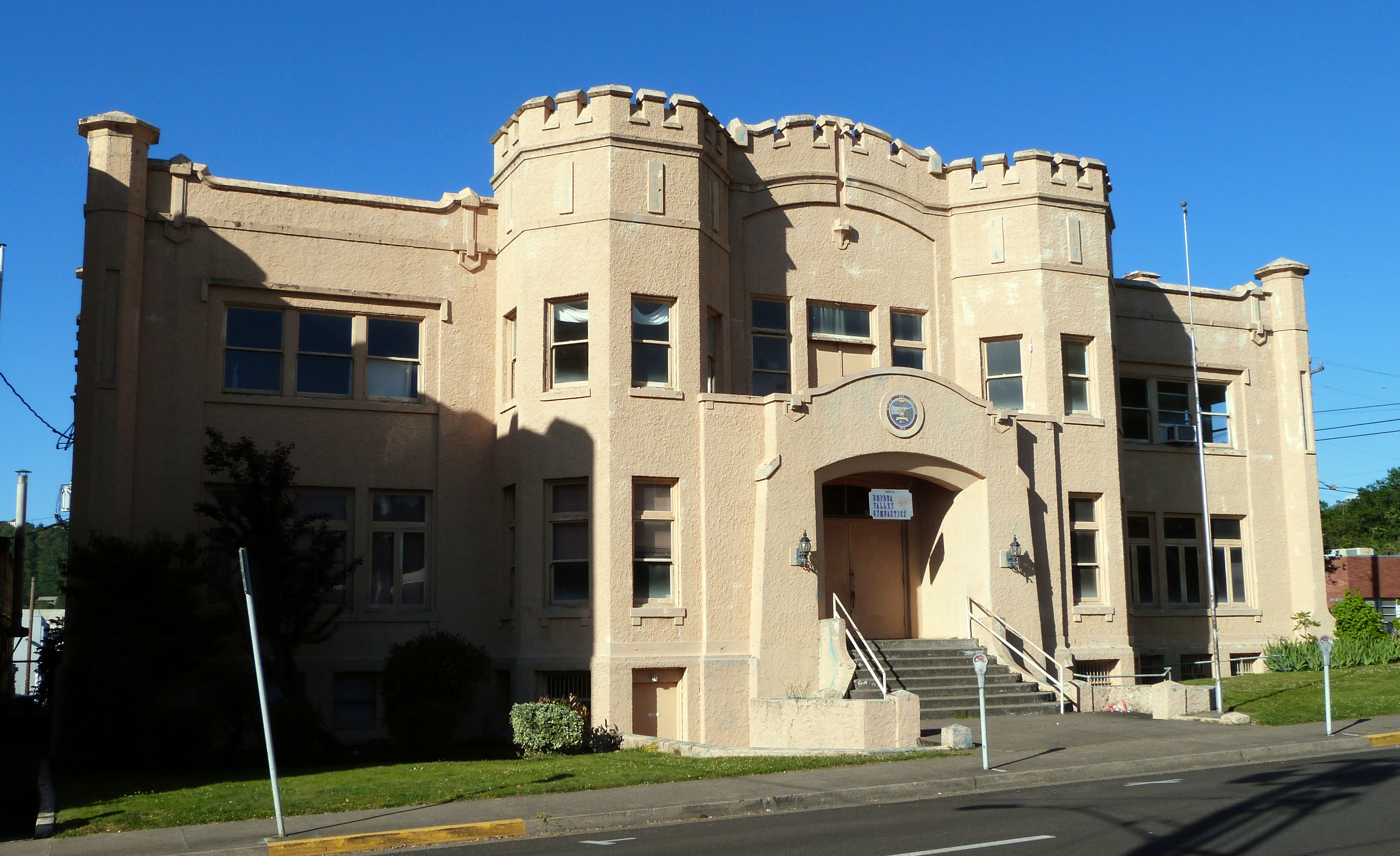
- The Roseburg Oregon National Guard Armory in 2013
- Location: 1034 SE Oak Avenue; Roseburg, Oregon
- Coordinates: 43°12′31″N 123°20′34″W
- Area: 0.41 acres (0.17 ha)
- Built: 1914
- Built by: John Hunter
- Architect: William C. Knighton
- Architectural style: Tudor Revival, with Vienna Secession and Arts and Crafts details
- Part of: Roseburg Downtown Historic District (ID02000661)
- NRHP reference No.: 93000447
- Added to NRHP: May 27, 1993

The Roseburg Oregon National Guard Armory, also known as the Flegel Community Center, is a historic former armory in downtown Roseburg, Oregon, United States. The Roseburg Oregon National Guard Armory served as the main office of the Roseburg National Guard Company from 1914 until 1977. The building became a full-time community center in 1977. The former armory is located at 1034 SE Oak Ave, Roseburg, OR 97470, and situated directly south of the Roseburg Post Office. The armory was placed in the National Register of Historic Places on April 15, 1993.

== Early history ==
The armory was built in 1913 and 1914. The state architect William C. Knighton designed the building, and John Hunter, a local contractor, constructed it. The building construction is in the Tudor Revival style and resembles a fortress. The armory is a two-story building that was constructed with concrete. The property is 0.41 acres. The main purpose was to provide storage for the equipment, and provide guardsmen a place to have drills. The other purposes of the armory was to be a defensive structure and an arms storage for the town of Roseburg. The armory was the noteworthy periods were the years of 1917 and 1943 because the national guardsmen from the Roseberg area were mobilized for both World Wars. In World War I, the national guardsmen of Oregon all became a part of 41st Infantry Division, and mobilized to France. In World War II, the national guardsmen of Oregon again became the 41st Infantry Division, but they mobilized to Southeast Pacific. In 1977, the armory was decommissioned as the Roseburg's National Guard Armory.

== Community center ==
The former armory became a community center after being decommissioned. The building was renamed to the Flegel Center in 1979. The name came to be to honor Albert E. Flegel. Albert E. Flegel was a World War 2 veteran and a mayor of Roseburg. The community has served as a children's gymnastics studio, a corporate office, an events center, and a basketball court.

== Umpqua Community College Student Residence ==
In July 2019, The Roseburg Planning Commission announced the approval of Umpqua Community College plans to allow 35 players and coaches to live in the Flegel Community Center. Umpqua Community College and Sweetwater Trust agreed to a three-year lease. The announcement of student athletes moving into the Flegel Center allowed students with trouble locating housing a place to settle. On October 3, it was announced that the former armory needed to undergo lead testing. The result meant that the students could not move in on the original date of October 15. In November 2019 it was announced that it is safe for student athletes to live in the center. The building was reconstructed to replicate an indoor baseball practice facility and a living dorm for the student athletes. The major area was renovated to include an artificial-turf carpet, so the players can have batting and pitching practice.

== See also ==
- National Register of Historic Places listings in Douglas County, Oregon
