= Oregon Transfer Company Building =

Historic building in Portland, Oregon, U.S.

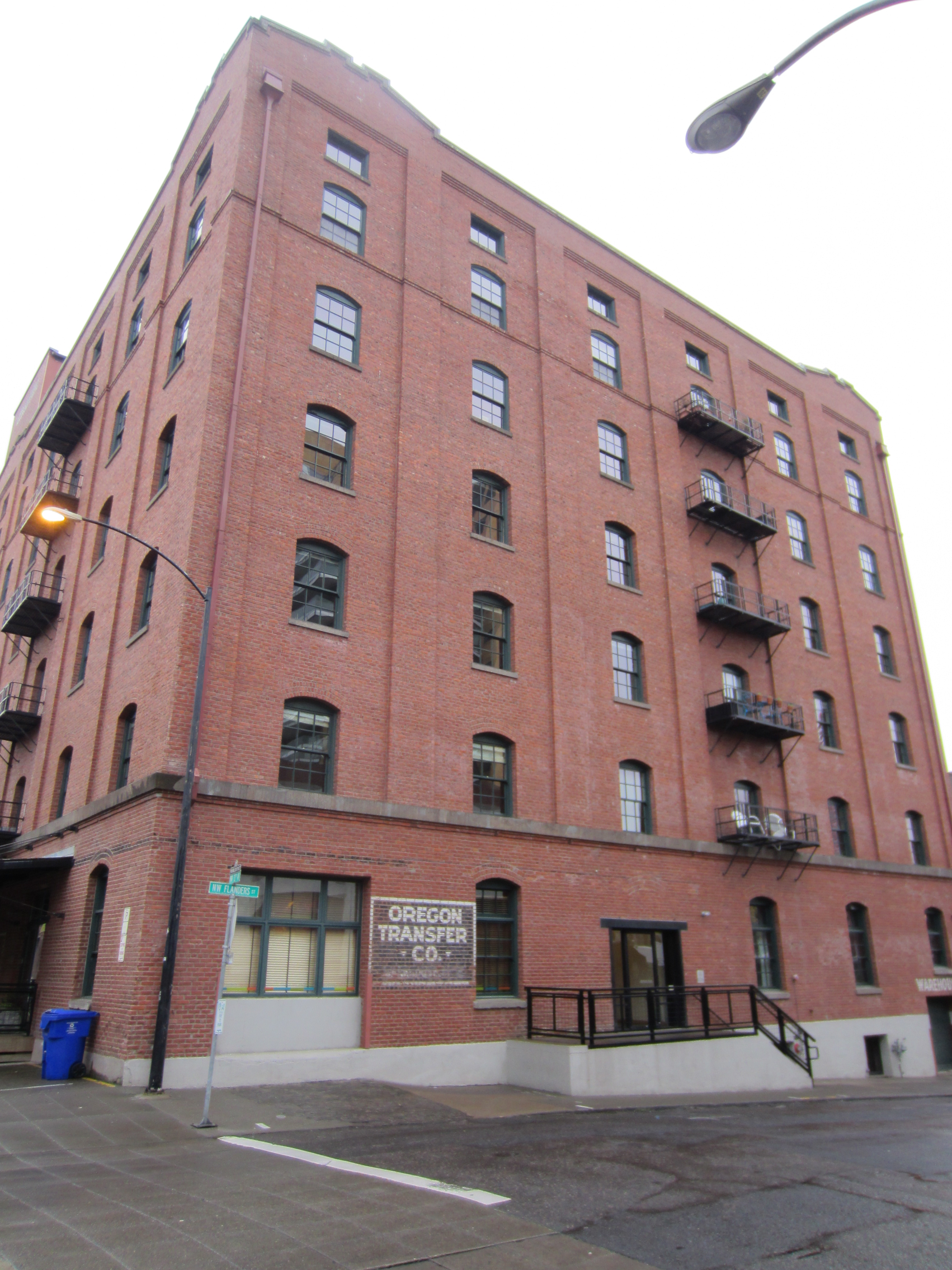
- The building's exterior in 2012
- Interactive map of the Oregon Transfer Company Building area

General information
- Location: Portland, Oregon, United States
- Coordinates: 45°31′33.7″N 122°41′2.3″W

The Oregon Transfer Company Building is a historic building in Portland, Oregon. Completed during 1910–1911, the structure is part of the Portland Thirteenth Avenue Historic District, which is listed on the National Register of Historic Places.
