= Crane Building (Portland, Oregon) =

Historic building in Portland, Oregon, U.S.

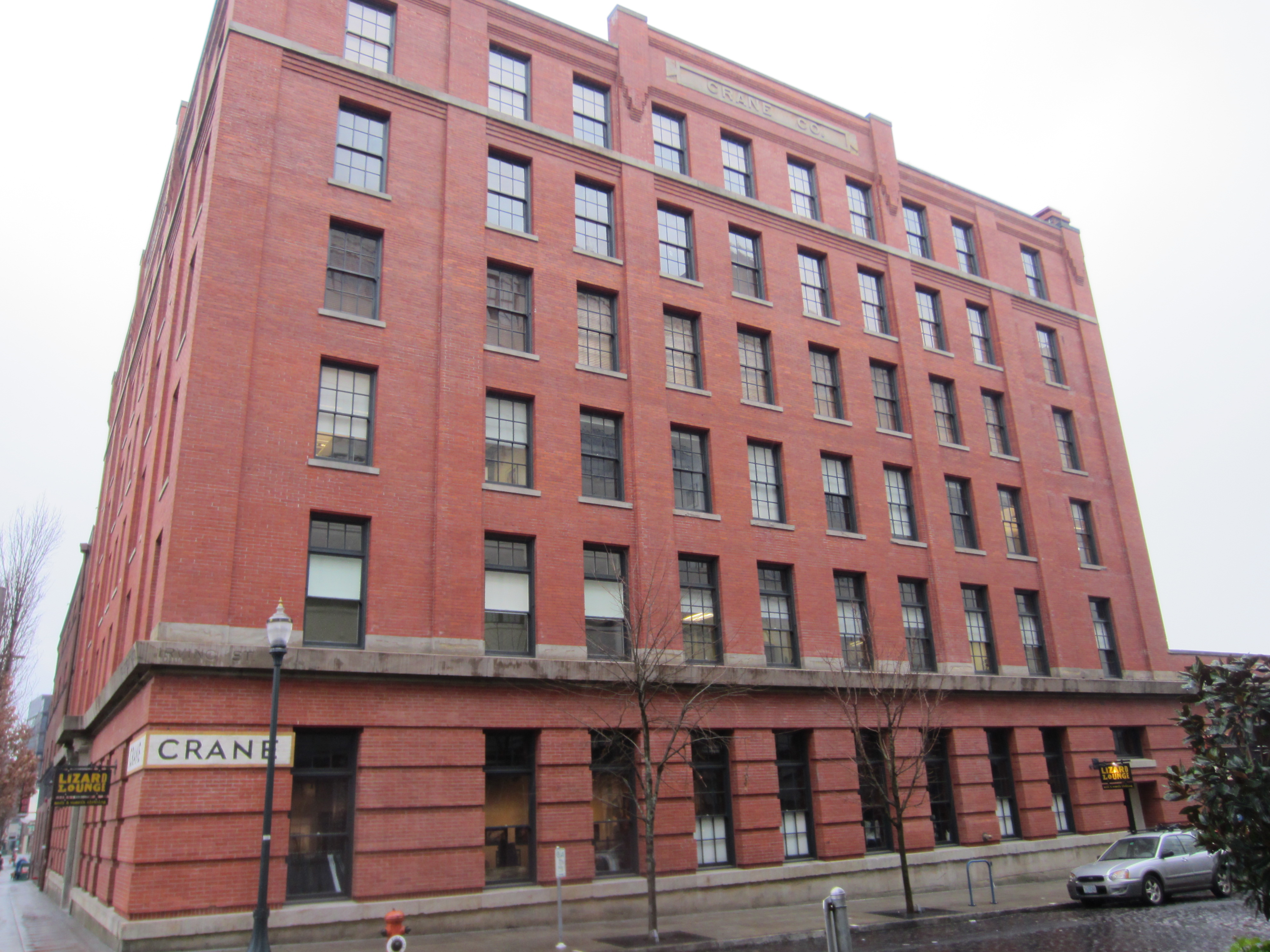
- The building's exterior in 2012
- Interactive map of the Crane Building area

General information
- Location: Portland, Oregon, United States
- Coordinates: 45.5280°N 122.6852°W

The Crane Building is a historic building in Portland, Oregon, United States. Completed in 1909, the structure is part of the Portland Thirteenth Avenue Historic District, which is listed on the National Register of Historic Places. The building was converted into the Crane Flats and Lofts Apartments by the architecture firm Sera in 2007.
