= Ashland Oregon National Guard Armory =

- Historic Ashland Armory
- U.S. National Register of Historic Places
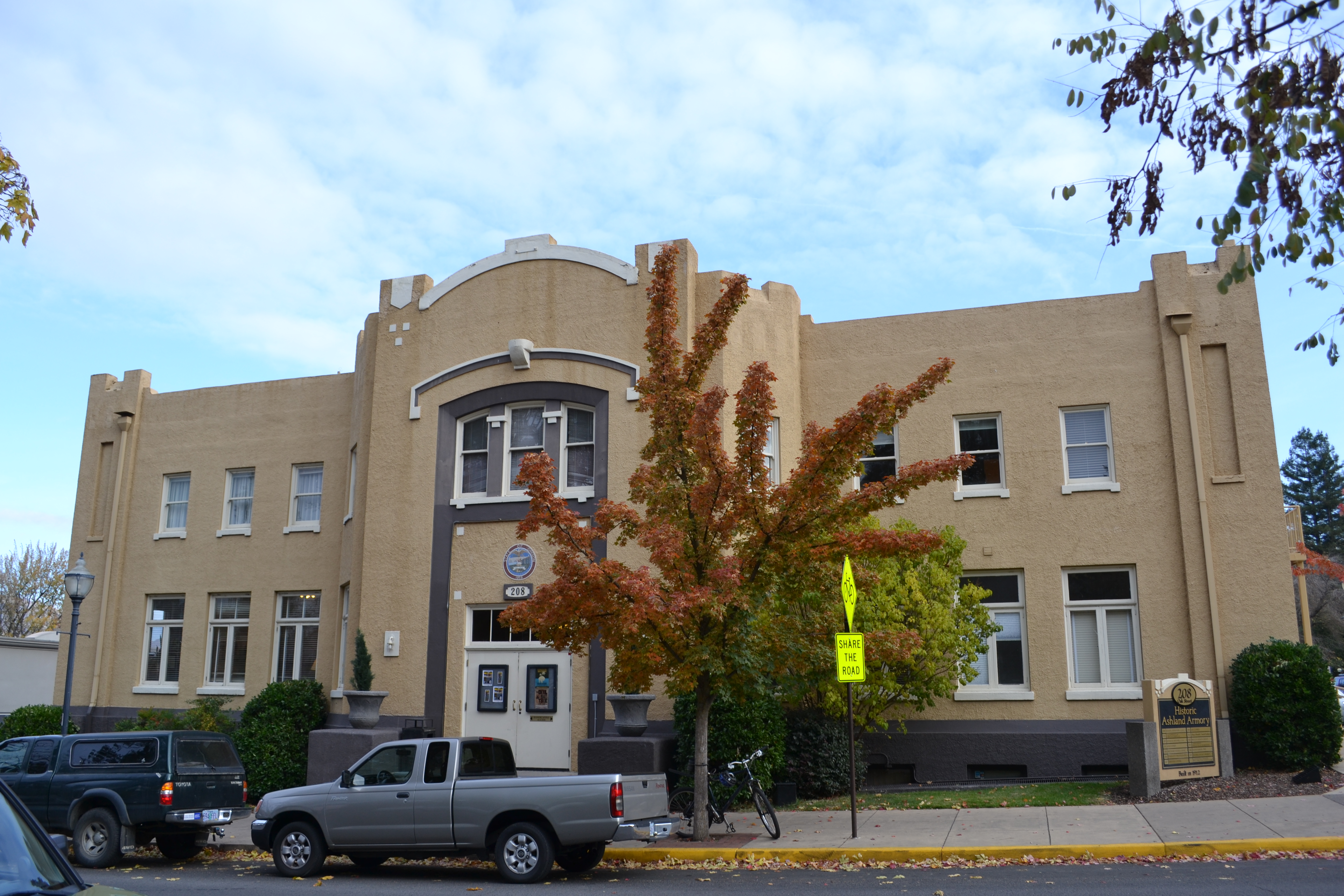
- The building in 2011

- Location within Oregon Location within the United States
- Location: 208 Oak Street, Ashland, Oregon
- Coordinates: 42°11′56″N 122°42′43″W
- Area: less than one acre
- Built: 1912–1913
- Architect: Charles Veghte, William C. Knighton
- Architectural style: California Mission, Castellated, Gothic Revival
- NRHP reference No.: 87001564
- Added to NRHP: September 10, 1987

The Ashland Oregon National Guard Armory, also known as The Historic Ashland Armory, is an armory building located in the historic district of Ashland, Oregon, in the United States. It was designed by William C. Knighton, Oregon's first State Architect, and was built from 1912 to 1913. The armory displays California Mission and Gothic Revival architectural styles and remains one of four pre-World War I armories in western Oregon. It is listed on the National Register of Historic Places.

It has been a cultural center, event space and music venue for the local community since the 1950s. It is also a commercial office space with over 25 office rentals.

== See also ==
- National Register of Historic Places listings in Jackson County, Oregon
