= Frigidaire Building =

Historic building in Portland, Oregon, U.S.

- U.S. National Register of Historic Places
- Portland Historic Landmark
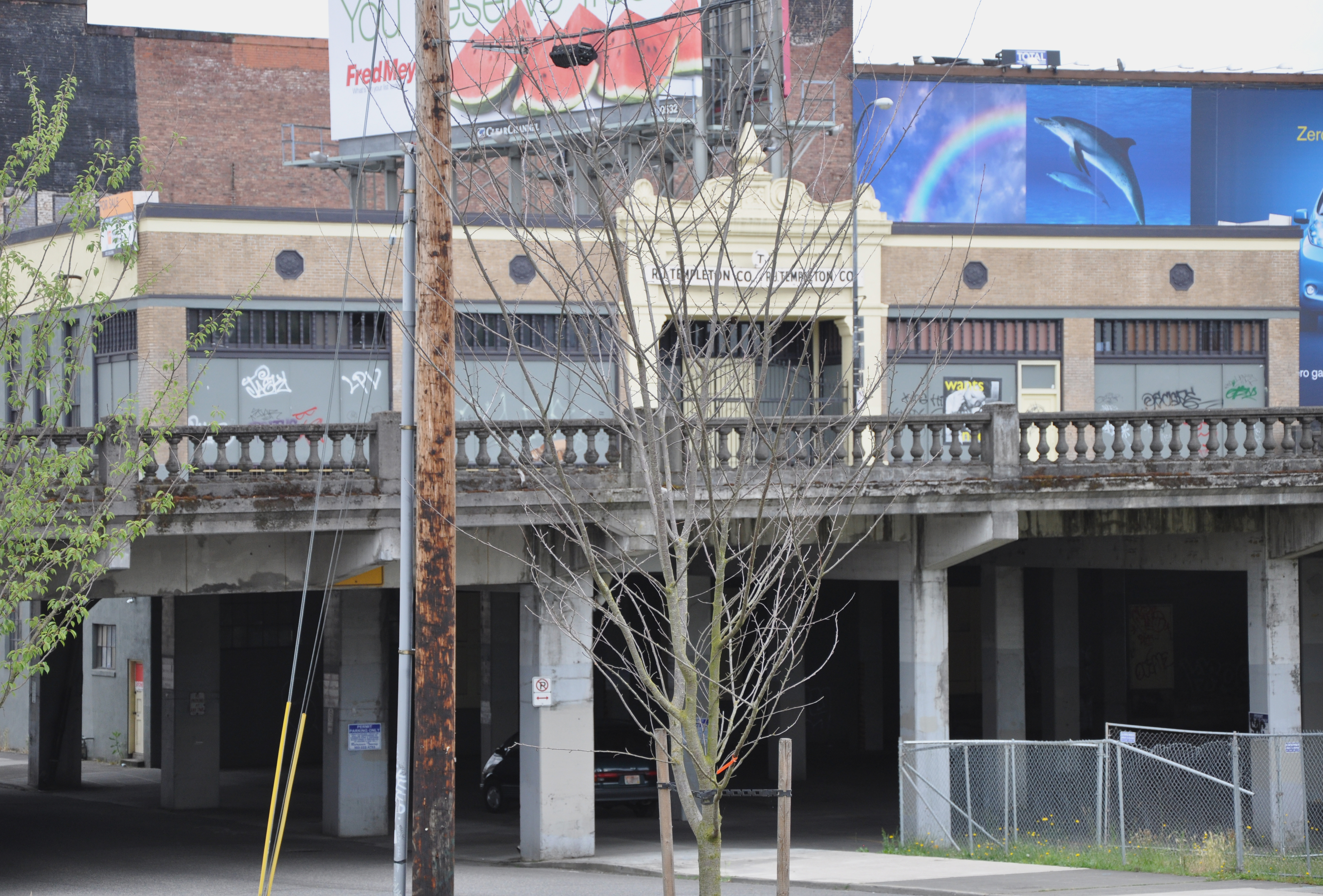
- Frigidaire Building, billboards, and Burnside Bridge supports in 2011
- Location: 230 E. Burnside Street; Portland, Oregon
- Coordinates: 45°31′22″N 122°39′47″W
- Built: 1929
- Architect: Knighton & Howell
- MPS: Portland Eastside MPS
- NRHP reference No.: 89000091
- Added to NRHP: March 8, 1989

The Frigidaire Building or Templeton Building is a building in southeast Portland, Oregon listed on the National Register of Historic Places. The building was designed by William C. Knighton and Leslie D. Howell and completed in 1929 for O.E. (Oscar) Heintz and occupied by Frigidaire until 1934. When prohibition was repealed in 1933, the Oregon Liquor Control Commission was created through Oregon's Knox Bill. OLCC occupied the building once Frigidare left. Later it was occupied by R.J. Templeton, an auto parts distributor.

The building was purchased by Artiste Lofts LLC in 2004 for $800,000. It had been previously owned by Joanne Ferrero. Later, the building contained Disjecta.

As of 2020 the building contains OMFGCO, a creative agency who placed a very visible quote on the building stating "Long live the wildcards, misfits & dabblers".

== See also ==
- National Register of Historic Places listings in Southeast Portland, Oregon
