= Judge James Watson Hamilton House =

Historic house in Oregon, United States

- U.S. National Register of Historic Places
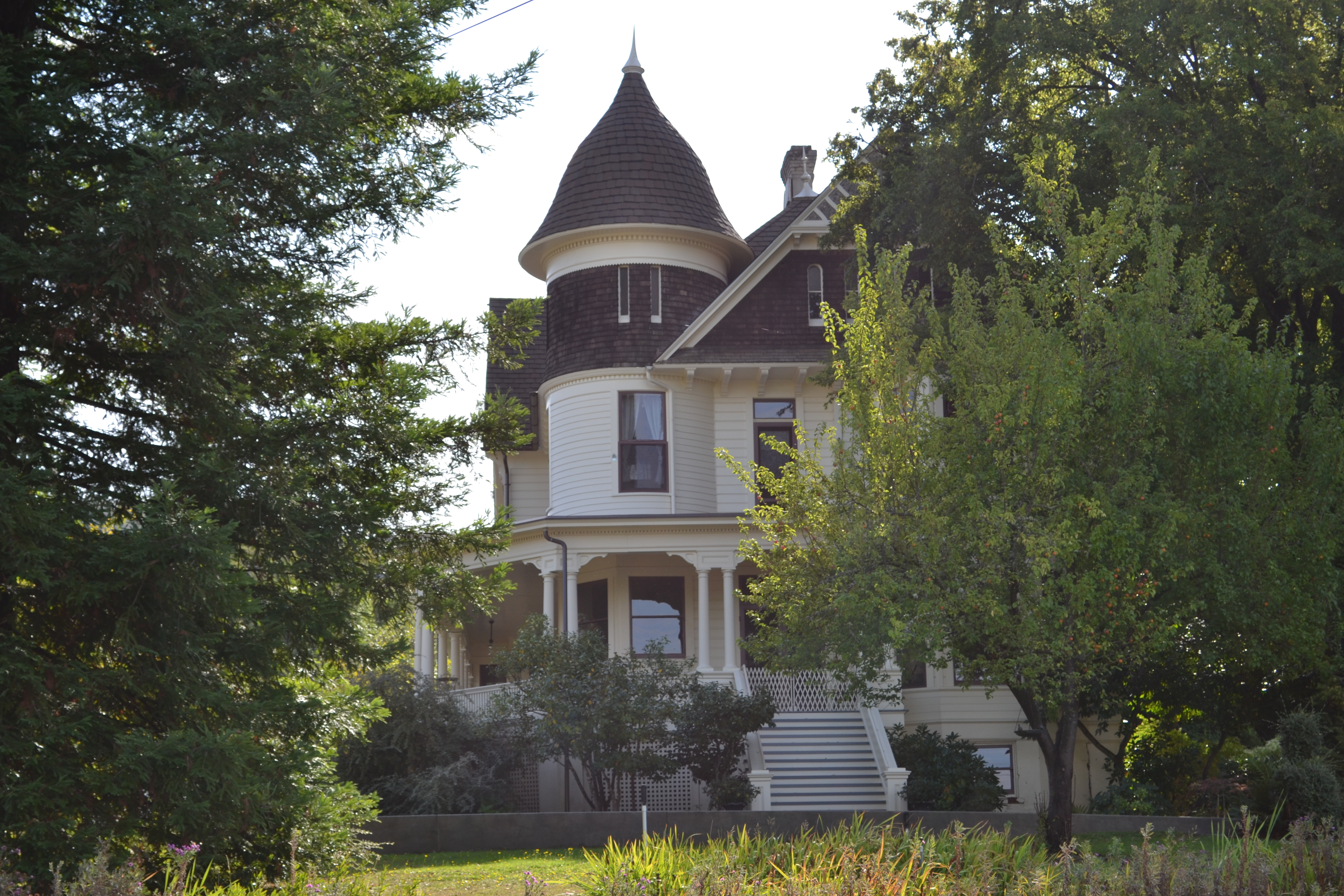

- Location within Oregon Location within the United States
- Location: 759 SE Kane St, Roseburg, Oregon
- Coordinates: 43°12′23″N 123°20′36″W
- Area: less than one acre
- Built: 1895
- Architect: William C. Knighton
- Architectural style: Queen Anne
- NRHP reference No.: 97000141
- Added to NRHP: February 21, 1997

The Judge James Watson Hamilton House is a historic house in Roseburg, Oregon, United States. The Queen Anne-style residence was designed by William C. Knighton in 1895. It is also known as the Helen Jane Clarke House.
