= Portland Thirteenth Avenue Historic District =

Historic district in Portland, Oregon, U.S.

- U.S. National Register of Historic Places
- U.S. Historic district
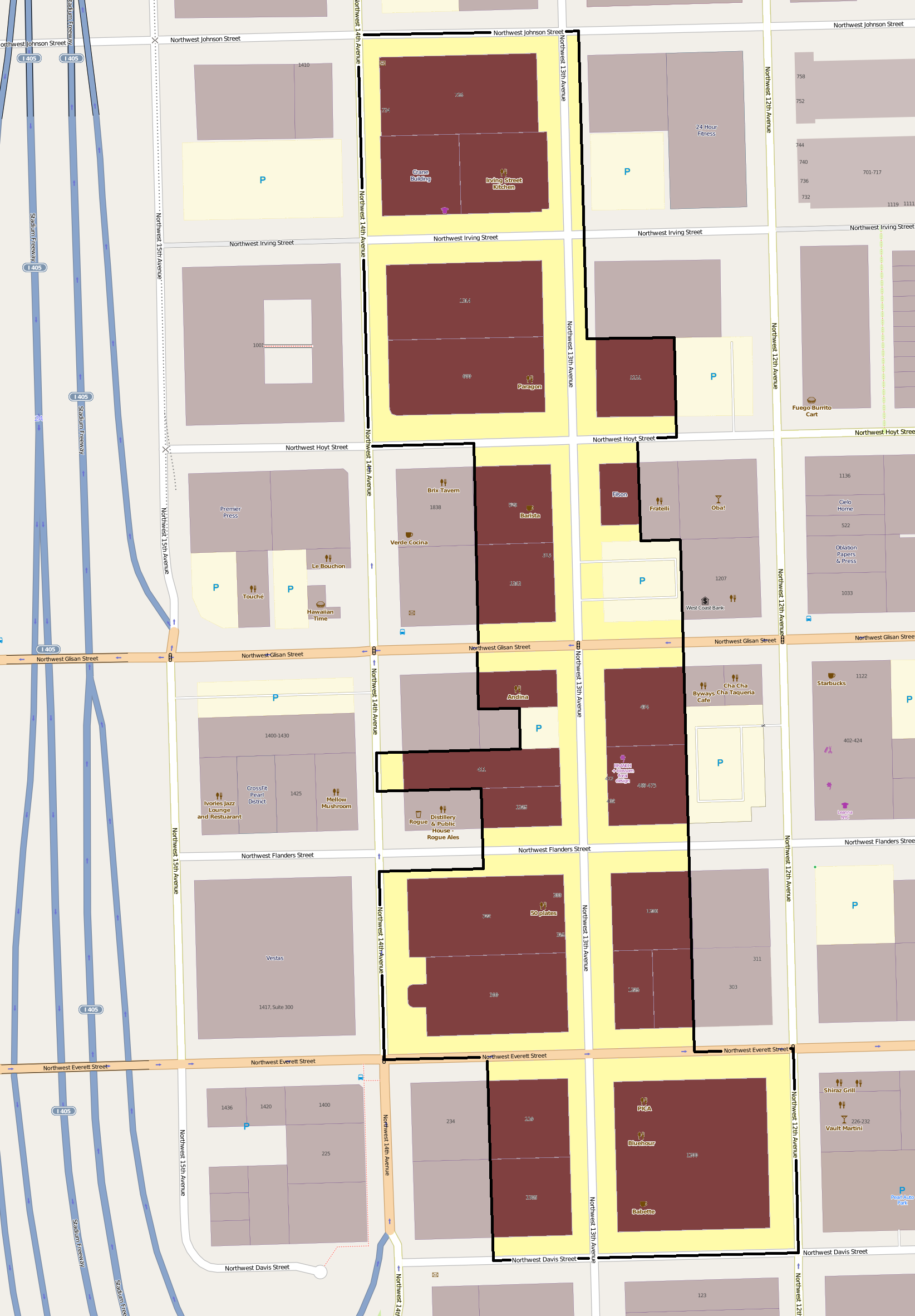

- Location within Oregon Location within the United States
- Location: NW Thirteenth Ave. between NW Davis and NW Johnson Sts., Portland, Oregon
- Coordinates: 45.5272°N 122.6843°W
- Area: 11.7 acres (4.7 ha)
- Architect: Strong and McNaughton; William C. Knighton
- NRHP reference No.: 87000888
- Added to NRHP: June 15, 1987

The Portland Thirteenth Avenue Historic District is a 11.7-acre (4.7 ha) historic district which was listed on the National Register of Historic Places in 1987.

It included 20 contributing buildings, including work by architect William C. Knighton.

Two buildings in the district were designed by architect William C. Knighton.

Structures:

- Wadhams and Kerr Bros. Building
- Kerr Building (or Platt Electric Building)
- General Electric Supply Corp. Building (or Dynagraphics Building)
- Meier Building (or Reed Harris Building)
- Armour Building (401 NW 13th Avenue)
- Dale Building
- Swift & Co. Building (Portland Antique Co. Building)
- Simon Building (McCoy Door Building)
- Gadsby Building (1306 NW Hoyt Street)
- 600 NW 14th Avenue
- Blumauer-Frank Building (or McKesson and Robbins Building)
- Crane Building
- Wool Growers Building (or Oregon School of Design/Mini-Storage Building)
- Prael, Hegele Building (or Maddox Building)
- Modern Confectionary Building (1240 NW Hoyt Street)
- Oregon Transfer Company Building
- Fisk Tire Building (or Metz Supply Building)
- Sinclair Building
- Fuller Co. Building (or Cold Storage Building), 1227 NW Davis Street
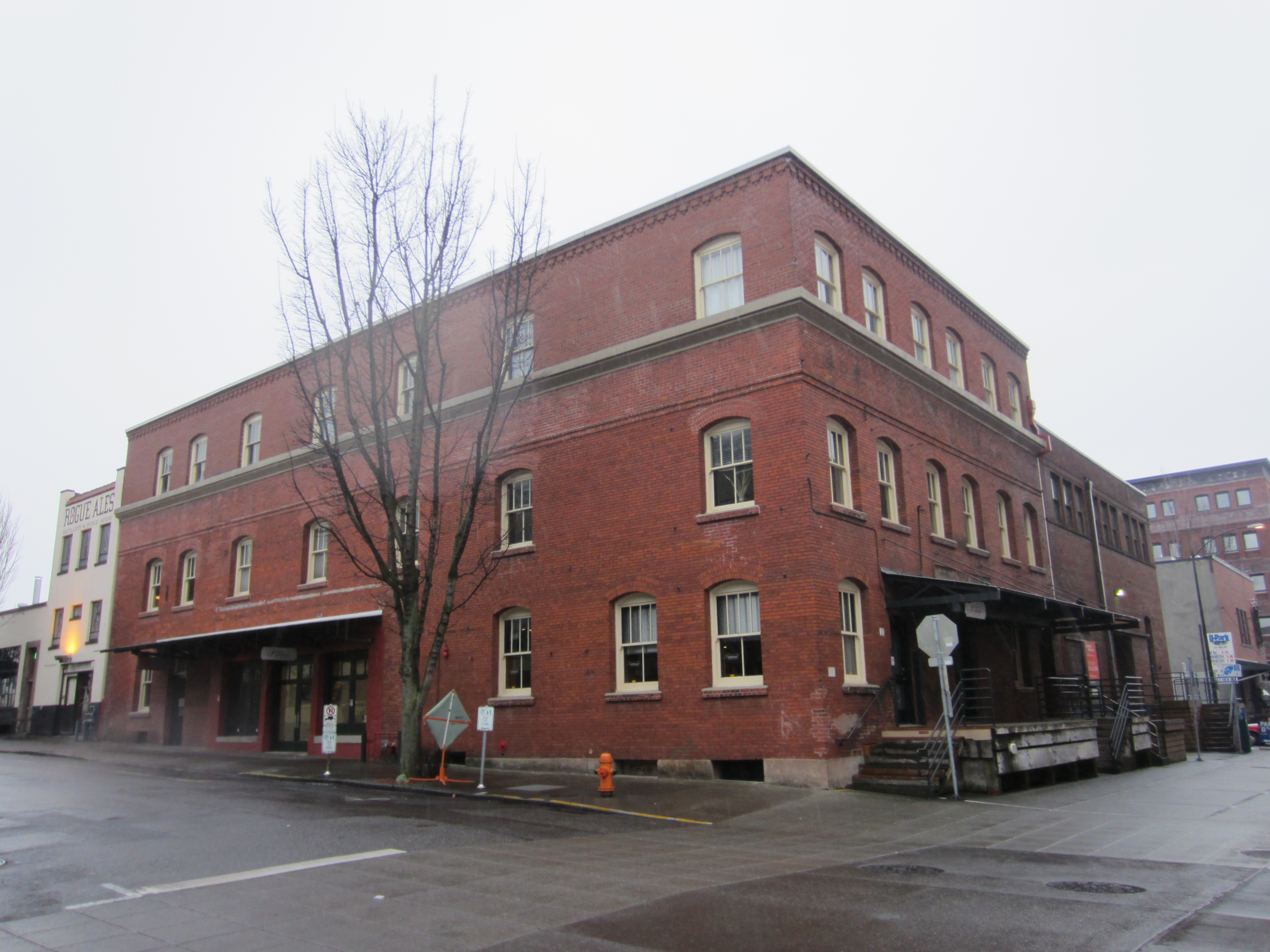
Armour and Company building

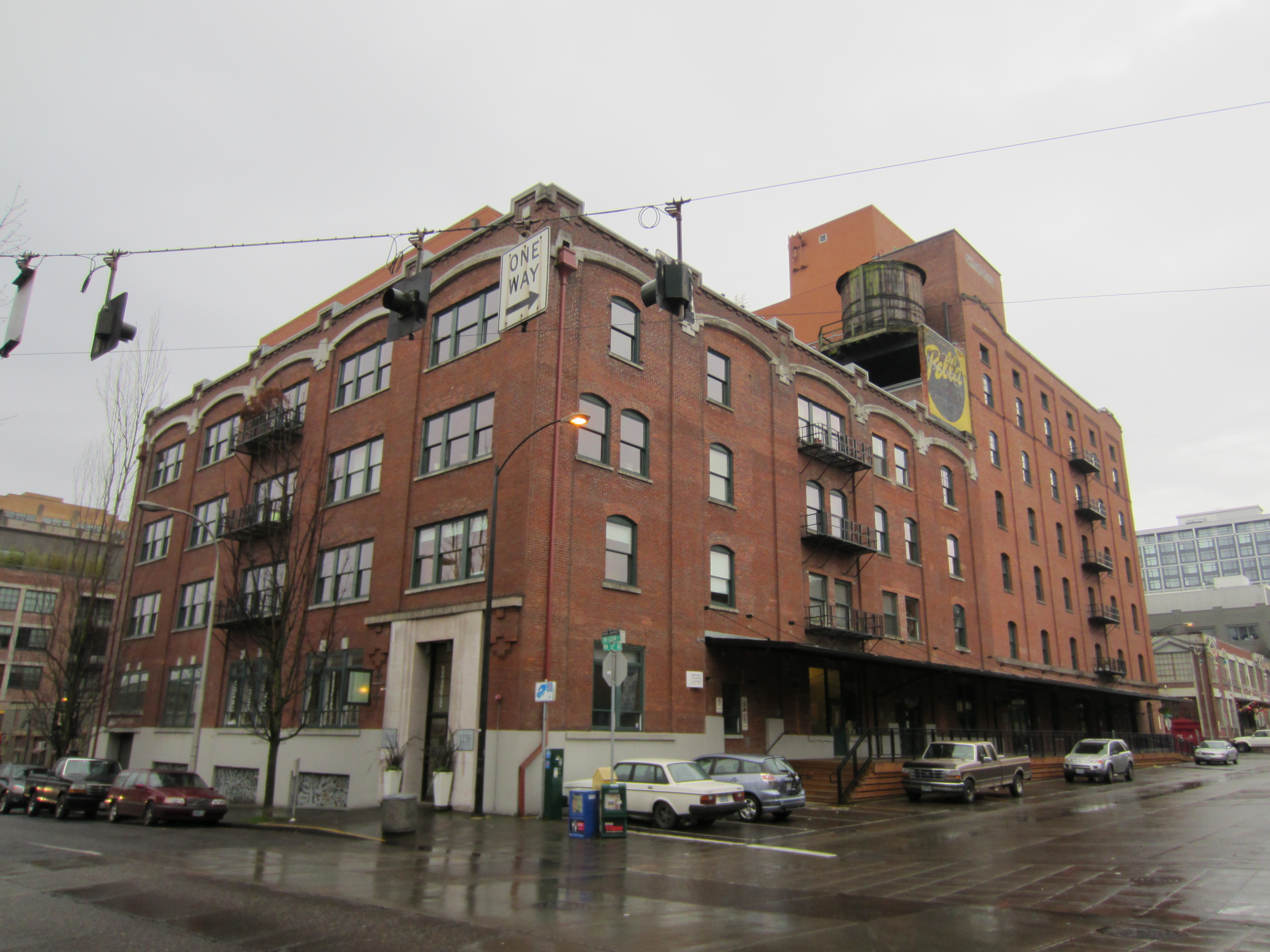
Chown Pella

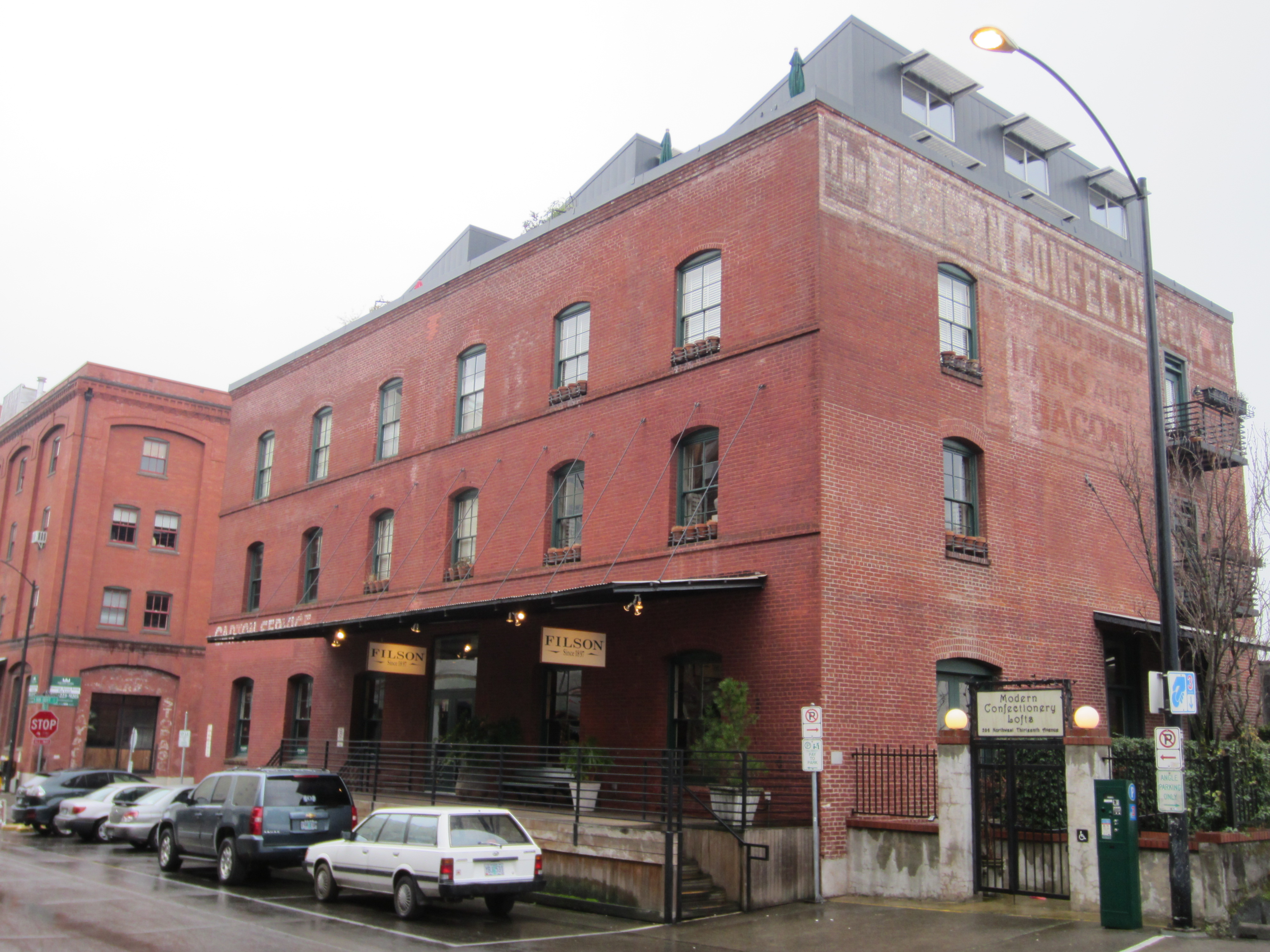
Filson
