= Packard Service Building =

Historic building in Portland, Oregon, U.S.

- U.S. National Register of Historic Places
- U.S. Historic district – Contributing property
- Portland Historic Landmark
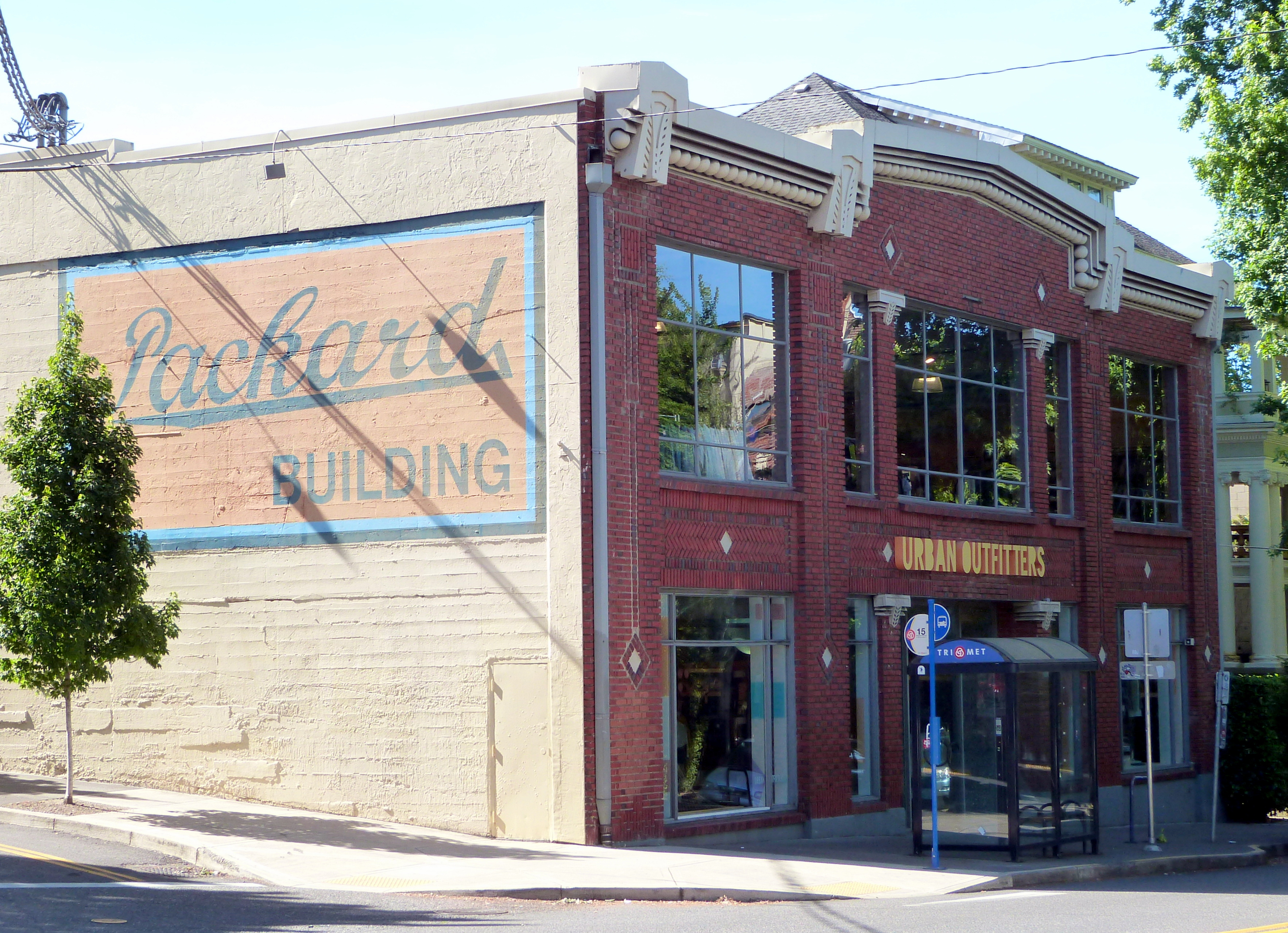
- The Packard Service Building in 2015

- Location within Portland, Oregon Location within Oregon Location within the United States
- Location: 121 NW 23rd Avenue; Portland, Oregon
- Coordinates: 45°31′27″N 122°41′55″W
- Built: 1910
- Architect: William C. Knighton
- Architectural style: Chicago
- Part of: Alphabet Historic District (ID00001293)
- NRHP reference No.: 93001570
- Added to NRHP: January 28, 1994

The Packard Service Building is a building located in northwest Portland, Oregon listed on the National Register of Historic Places.

== See also ==
- National Register of Historic Places listings in Northwest Portland, Oregon
