= Oregon circuit courts =

Oregon's circuit courts are general jurisdiction trial courts of the U.S. state of Oregon. These courts hear civil and criminal court cases.

The state has 27 circuit court districts, most of which correspond to the boundaries of Oregon's 36 counties. The sixth, seventh, tenth, fifteenth, twenty-second and twenty-fourth districts cover two or more counties while the rest cover just one county each.

The courts are operated by the Oregon Judicial Department (OJD). As of January 2007, the courts had 173 judges. The majority of appeals from the circuit courts go to the Oregon Court of Appeals. Some limited cases go directly to the Oregon Supreme Court if appealed from the trial court level.

In 2010, Chief Justice Paul J. De Muniz issued an order creating the statewide Oregon Complex Litigation Court within the circuit courts.

The OJD has no jurisdiction over other local courts in Oregon, which include county courts, justice courts, and municipal courts.

In 1998, the state combined its state district courts into the Oregon circuit courts.

== Circuits ==
1. First Judicial District – Jackson
2. Second Judicial District – Lane
3. Third Judicial District – Marion
4. Fourth Judicial District – Multnomah. Multnomah County Court. The chief prosecutor is the Multnomah County District Attorney.
5. Fifth Judicial District – Clackamas
6. Sixth Judicial District – Umatilla, Morrow
7. Seventh Judicial District – Sherman, Gilliam, Wheeler, Wasco, Hood River
8. Eighth Judicial District – Baker
9. Ninth Judicial District – Malheur
10. Tenth Judicial District – Wallowa, Union
11. Eleventh Judicial District – Deschutes
12. Twelfth Judicial District – Polk
13. Thirteenth Judicial District – Klamath
14. Fourteenth Judicial District – Josephine
15. Fifteenth Judicial District – Coos, Curry
16. Sixteenth Judicial District – Douglas
17. Seventeenth Judicial District – Lincoln
18. Eighteenth Judicial District – Clatsop
19. Nineteenth Judicial District – Columbia
20. Twentieth Judicial District – Washington
21. Twenty-first Judicial District – Benton
22. Twenty-second Judicial District – Crook, Jefferson
23. Twenty-third Judicial District – Linn
24. Twenty-fourth Judicial District – Harney, Grant
25. Twenty-fifth Judicial District – Yamhill
26. Twenty-sixth Judicial District – Lake
27. Twenty-seventh Judicial District – Tillamook

== See also ==
- Government of Oregon
- Oregon Tax Court
