= Oregon Supreme Court Building =

Government building in Salem, Oregon, U.S.

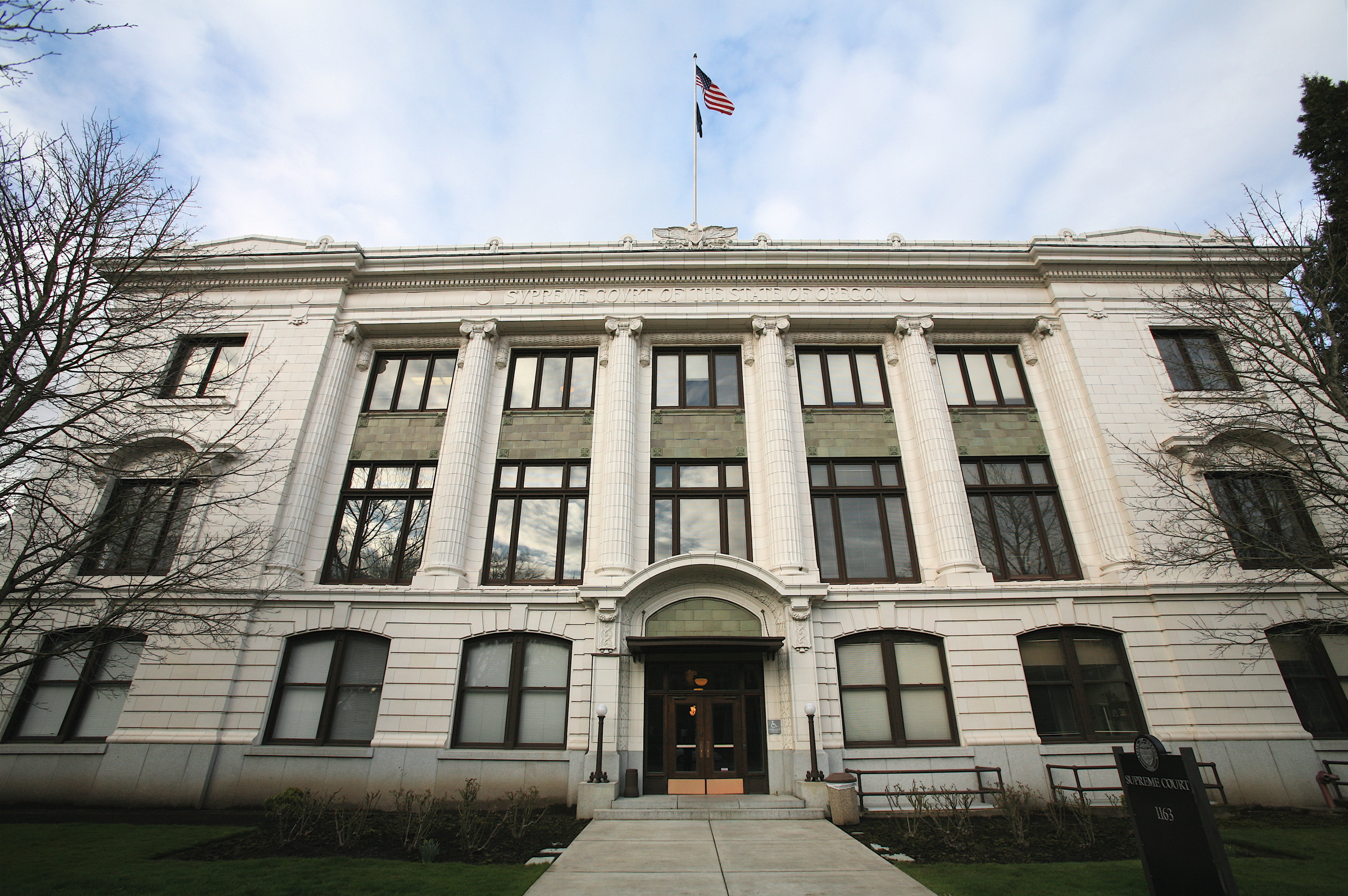
- Front of the building on State Street
- Interactive map of the Oregon Supreme Court Building area

General information
- Type: State government
- Location: 1163 State Street; Salem, Oregon; United States
- Coordinates: 44.937509°N 123.027617°W
- Construction started: 1913
- Completed: 1914

Technical details
- Floor count: 3

Design and construction
- Architect: William C. Knighton

The Oregon Supreme Court Building is the home to the Oregon Supreme Court, Oregon Court of Appeals, and the Oregon Judicial Department. Located in the state capitol complex in Salem, it is Oregon's oldest state government building. The three-story structure was completed in 1914 and currently houses the state's law library, and once housed the Oregon State Library.

== History ==
The state supreme court used to hold session in various locations in downtown Salem. In 1854 Oregon Territory began construction of the Territorial Capitol Building in Salem that was finished in 1855. The court was briefly located in that building on the second floor. However, on December 29, 1855 after the building was partially occupied, it was razed by fire. Then in 1876 the state finished construction on a second capitol building where the court was located on the third floor.

In 1911, a bill was introduced in the Oregon Legislature by John A. Carson (grandfather of future Chief Justice Wallace P. Carson, Jr.) to expand the 1876 capitol building to add a wing for the court. This bill was later amended to allow for the construction of a separate building instead. Construction began in 1912 with the design by local architect William C. Knighton. Knighton was the state's first official architect. The building was completed in early 1914 and the first session of court in the building was held on February 14, 1914 in the third floor courtroom. This was the 55th anniversary of Oregon's statehood. Total cost for the structure was $320,000.

Prior to the completion of the Oregon State Library Building in 1939 the state library was located in the basement and first floor of the Supreme Court Building. As this building and the Oregon State Capitol were connected by tunnels used for utilities, the fire that destroyed the capitol in 1935 also damaged the library. This was due to all the water that was used to fight the fire drained into the basement and destroyed many books in the library. On October 12, 1962, during the Columbus Day Storm that caused an estimated $170 million in damages, the decorative stained-glass skylight in the courtroom was damaged. The original stained-glass piece was created by Povey Brothers Art Glass Works, who were the premier artisans of that trade in the Northwest from 1888 to 1929.

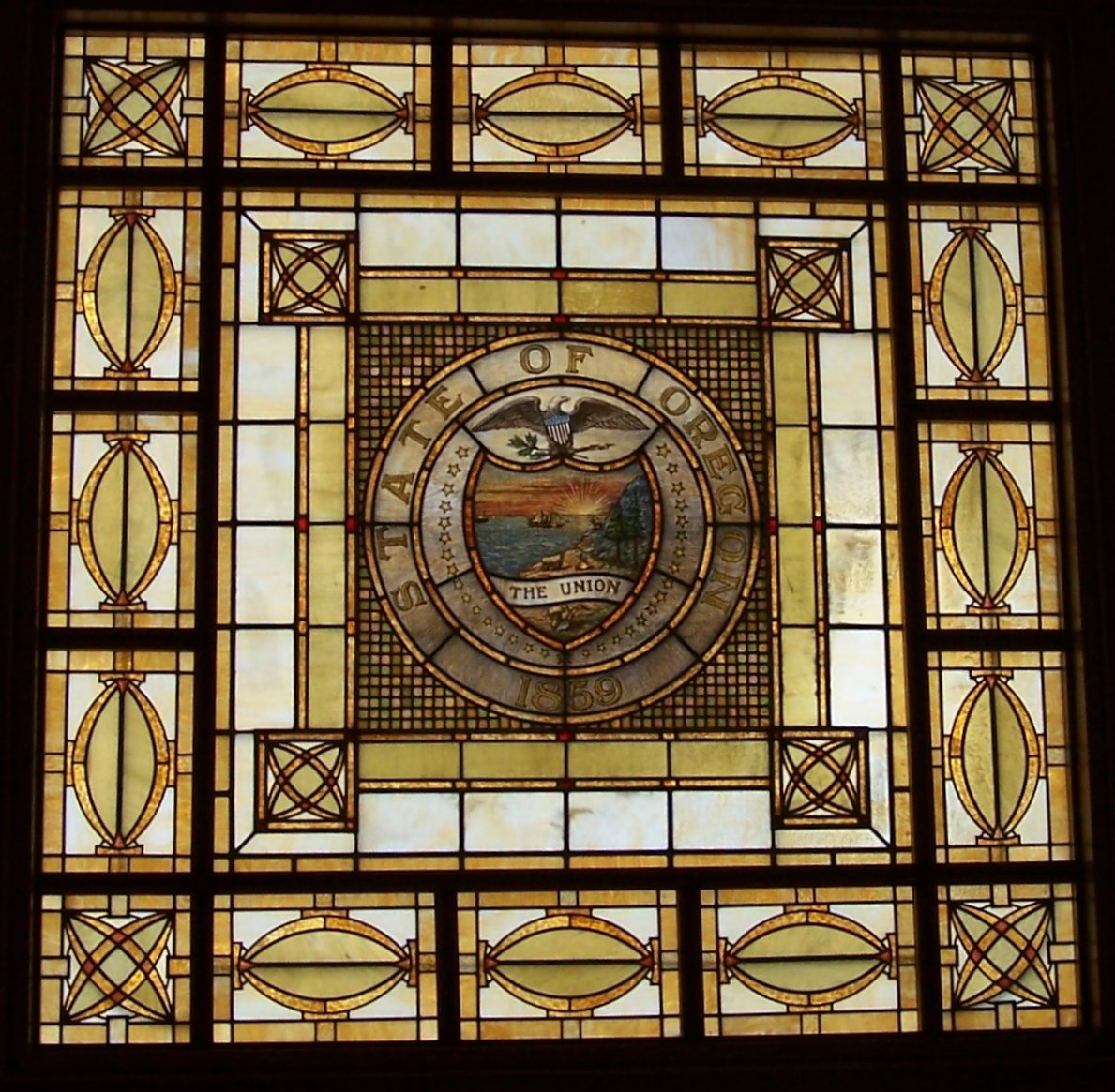
Stained-glass skylight above the third floor courtroom.

Beginning in 1981 the building was renovated with much of the courtroom refurbished with Italian silk paneling, hand-painted carpet, and new furniture built by inmates. This refurbishing was completed in 2002 when the State of Oregon Law Library's renovations were completed. During this time in 1989, the building was added to Salem's Historic Properties List as a local historic landmark. Funds for the renovations came from private donors. The stained-glass skylight located above the courtroom that has a design of the Oregon State Seal was reinforced at this time and a protective clear skylight was built over the decorative skylight installed in 1914. The building was listed on the National Register of Historic Places in 2020.

== Architecture ==
The building's exterior's finish is a cream colored terra cotta. It has five ornate columns in relief on the front of the building's façade. The exterior was designed to resemble the previous Oregon Capitol building (which burned in 1935). On the interior, the building contains a marble finish, ornate spiral staircase, the stained-glass skylight, a library with columns throughout, and tile flooring. The primary wood used in the courtroom is Philippine mahogany.

== Currently ==
The Oregon Supreme Court Building currently houses the courtroom for the Supreme Court and the state's law library. This single courtroom is also home to where oral arguments are heard for the Oregon Court of Appeals, while the building is home to Oregon Judicial Department. The Supreme Court's courtroom and offices for the justices are located on the third floor. This building is the oldest state government building in Oregon. In 2006, new security measures were implemented at the building that require visitors to sign in with an Oregon State Police officer who is posted at a security desk near the main entrance to the building on the first floor.

In October 2019 the Court moved to temporary quarters elsewhere in the city when the building began two years of upgrades to include strengthening the structure against earthquake.

=== Law library ===
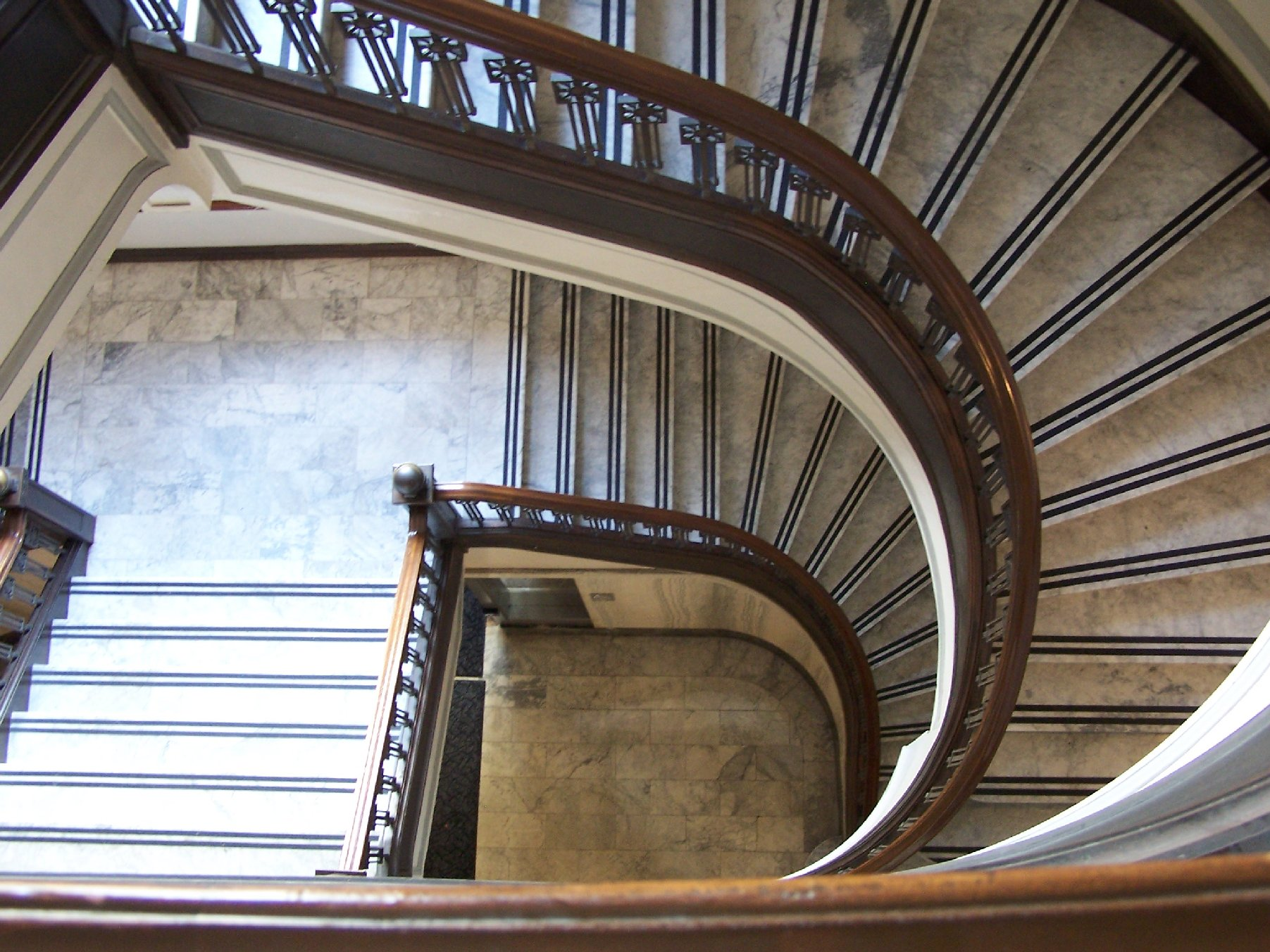
Staircase inside the building

The State of Oregon Law Library on the second floor of the building was created in 1848 when Oregon Territory was created. In 1851 the legislature passed an act to provide a librarian for this library that mainly served Oregon government officials. Then in 1855 a capitol building was nearly complete when it burned down on December 29, 1855. This building included the law library on the second floor. In 1905 control of the library was changed to the Oregon Supreme Court and both moved into the Supreme Court Building in 1914. In 2002 the library name was changed from the Oregon Supreme Court Library to the State of Oregon Law Library after the completion of renovations that among other items increased the number of electrical outlets from just two.

Currently the library is open to everyone and is the largest state government law library in the state. The library is a split level facility existing on both the second floor and third floor of the building. The library has a total of 165,000 volumes in its collections. Collections include the laws of all United States jurisdictions, many historical legal documents, and a variety of legal periodicals. The library is also a depository for the Federal Depository Library Program.

Historical documents include an 1854 copy of the Revised Statutes of the Territory of Oregon and a copy of the Congressional Act creating the Oregon Territory from 1848. Historical books include one from 1569 concerning Magna Carta, an 18th-century book by Blackstone, and a 17th-century version of Coke's Commentary. Additional items of historic note are a large, ornate safe that traveled around Cape Horn and an oak chest built for justice Lord by a prisoner that was allowed to stay in prison after his sentence had ended at his own request. As the primary legal resource for the state government, it also has a collection of case law from all fifty states. Along with the Oregon State Library and Willamette University’s J. W. Long Law Library and Hatfield libraries, the law library is a member of the Hatfield Library Consortium and shares a single reference catalog. The library is staffed by librarians and contains copy machines and computers for legal research.
