= Justice courts (Oregon) =

Courts of law in Oregon

Justice courts are state courts of law in Oregon. While the Justice Court is a kind of state court, and the Justice of the Peace is an Oregon State Court judge, the Justice Courts are financed and authorized by their respective counties. Because Justice Courts are financed by the counties, they are not part of the Oregon Judicial Department.

Justice Courts have been part of Oregon's legal framework since before Oregon was a territory. In Oregon, Justice Courts have jurisdiction over civil lawsuits of less than $10,000; evictions; misdemeanors, and violations, like traffic tickets, boating violations, and wildlife violations. Further, Justice Courts have jurisdiction over violations of the county code, and some Justice Courts act as the municipal court of certain cities. Justice courts do not have jurisdiction over certain types of civil cases, including disputes over title to real estate, false imprisonment, libel, slander, and malicious prosecution. Justices of the Peace are authorized to perform courthouse weddings in Oregon.

Justice Courts can empanel juries, but most matters in Justice Court are tried to the bench, where the Justice is the factfinder. No Justice Court is currently a court of record, so appeals run through the Circuit Court.

The Judge at a Justice Court is called the Justice of the Peace. A Justice of the Peace is elected for a term of six years. If a Justice of the Peace position becomes vacant during the Justice's term, the Governor appoints a Justice to fill the vacancy until the next general election.

Justice Courts are smaller than circuit courts, so many customers find them easier to navigate. Further, the filing fees in Justice Court are often cheaper than the filing fees in Circuit Court. Most cases in Justice Court are either pro se (no lawyers) or half-se (only one side represented by lawyers) so Justice Courts are accustomed to working with self-represented litigants.

As of 2023, there are 22 justice courts in the following counties: Baker, Clackamas, Columbia, Deschutes, Douglas (Canyonville), Douglas (Reedsport), Gilliam, Grant, Harney, Hood River, Jackson, Klamath, Lane, Linn, Malheur, Marion, Morrow, Sherman, Tillamook, Union, Washington, and Wheeler.
