= Oregon Tax Court =

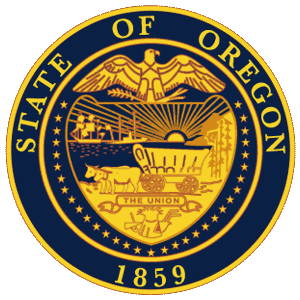
- State Seal of Oregon
- Established: 1962
- Jurisdiction: Oregon
- Location: Salem, Oregon
- Composition method: Non-partisan statewide election
- Judge term length: 6 years
- Number of positions: 1
- Website: Official site

Judge
- Currently: Robert T. Manicke
- Since: 2018

The Oregon Tax Court is a state court in the U.S. state of Oregon, which has jurisdiction in questions of law that regard state tax laws. Examples of matters that would come before this court include income taxes, corporate excise taxes, property taxes, timber taxes, cigarette taxes, local budget law, and property tax limitations. The purpose of the court is parallel to that of the United States Tax Court. Taxpayers and tax authorities can take advantage of a court that is familiar with taxation issues.

The majority of Oregon Tax Court cases are filed by taxpayers who are unhappy with the decisions of the Oregon Department of Revenue or a county tax assessor.

The Oregon Tax Court has a single judge who is elected in a statewide election to a 6-year term. The position has been held since January, 2018 by Judge Robert T. Manicke, who was appointed by Governor Kate Brown. He was elected to a full six-year term in November 2018.

The court is divided into two divisions: the Magistrate Division and the Regular Division.

== Magistrate Division ==
The Tax Court judge appoints one presiding tax court magistrate and some number of other magistrates, currently about three. Typically, the magistrate is a practicing attorney who is appointed by the court as a judicial officer to hear cases informally. The magistrate will attempt to mediate the situation between parties before bringing the case to trial. Court rules are informal, and the parties may choose to represent themselves. They may also be represented by any one of a list of persons, including a lawyer, an accountant, a licensed appraiser, or others. If mediation is unsuccessful, the magistrate will consider the words and evidence of both parties and render a written decision.

Decisions of the Magistrate Division may be appealed to the Regular Division of the Oregon Tax Court.

== Regular Division ==
The Regular division is a more formal court proceeding, and it is presided over by the Tax Court judge. While parties can represent themselves, usually they are represented by an attorney. The rules for this court are the Tax Court Rules, which are very similar to the Oregon Rules for Civil Procedure, and similar to an Oregon Circuit Court in terms of rules of evidence and procedure. All cases are tried by the judge without a jury. Cases that were referred from the Magistrate division will be started again from the beginning, so the judge can get a fresh look at the evidence.

One advantage of having this separate court is that the judge and staff become quite familiar with taxation issues and property valuation issues. This effort attempts to make these types of cases more efficient and the rulings more consistent.

== Property tax appeals ==
A common type of case brought to the Tax Court is a dispute related to property valuation. In property tax cases, the issue is rarely related to the rate of tax. These cases are often complicated due to the judgments that must be made regarding what the value of a given piece of property might be.

== Oversight ==
As with all state courts within Oregon, supervision of the Tax Court lies with the Chief Justice of the Oregon Supreme Court. Additionally, decisions by the Tax Court are eligible for appeal to the Oregon Supreme Court, not to the Oregon Court of Appeals.
