= State Library of Oregon =

Library in Salem, Oregon, U.S.

Coordinates: 44.939863°N 123.030868°W

- Location: Salem, Oregon
- Established: 1905; 121 years ago
- Service area: Oregon
- Branches: 1

Other information
- Budget: $7,184,308
- Oregon State Librarian: Wendy Cornelisen
- Employees: 41
- Public transit access: Cherriots
- Website: oregon.gov/library

The State Library of Oregon is the library for the U.S. state of Oregon, located directly northwest of the Oregon State Capitol in Salem. Its mission is to provide leadership and resources to continue growing vibrant library services for Oregonians with print disabilities, the Legislature and state government, and all Oregonians through local libraries.

== History ==
The Territorial Library was first housed in the Territorial Capitol Building, which burned down in 1855 with most of the library collection lost to the fire. The library collection was lost again in 1889, when a storm blew the roof off of the new Capitol building.

The Oregon State Library was established as the Oregon Library Commission in 1905. The original mission of the Library was to establish public and school libraries throughout Oregon. Cornelia Marvin came to Oregon from the Wisconsin Free Library Commission to direct the commission, and later became the first State Librarian. Soon the State Library was also providing information to state government agencies and collecting and preserving the publications of state agencies.

From 1913, prior to the completion of a stand-alone building in 1939, the State Library was located in the basement and first floor of the Oregon Supreme Court Building. This building and the Oregon State Capitol were connected by tunnels used for heating and electricity. The fire that destroyed the capitol in 1935 also caused damage to the library collections when the water used to fight the fire drained into the basement.

Work on the current State Library building began in February 1928, funded by $450,000 from the Public Works Administration.

In 1969, the Library took over Talking Book and Braille library services for blind and print-disabled Oregonians, which had previously been handled by the Multnomah County Library in Portland.

=== State Librarians ===
The current State Librarian is Wendy Cornelisen. Past State Librarians include Jennifer Patterson, MaryKay Dahlgreen, Jim Scheppke, Wesley Doak, Marcia Lowell, Eloise Ebert, Eleanor Stephens, Harriet Long, Virginia C. Bacon, and Cornelia Marvin.

== Operations ==
The State Library provides information services to over 37,000 state government employees, circulates library materials in audio and Braille format to about 5,200 blind and print-disabled Oregonians, and provides grants and assistance to help develop and improve local library services and to foster greater cooperation among all of Oregon's libraries. The library is also a regional depository for the Federal Depository Library Program.

Since its founding, the State Library has been governed by an independent State Library Board consisting of nine members from throughout the state who are appointed by the governor and confirmed by the Senate to serve four-year terms. The director of the State Library is the State Librarian, who is responsible for leading employees of the State Library to fulfill the goals set by the Governor, Oregon Legislature, and State Library Board, while also serving as the Secretary for the State Library Board. The board had the power to appoint the State Librarian until 2017, when this authority was given to the governor of Oregon as a result of Oregon House Bill 3523, which was passed in 2015 by the 78th Oregon Legislative Assembly. The State Librarian is also ex officio member of the Oregon Library Association Board.

The current State Librarian is Wendy Cornelisen, who has been in the position since 2022. The current board members are Anne-Marie Dietering, Heather Estrada, Nikotris Lewis, Ann Malkin, Jim Portillo, Tina Roberts, Ben Tate, Sachi Weerawardena, and Greg Williams.

== Building and location ==
The State Library building is located at the corner of Winter Street and Court Street in downtown Salem. It is connected to the Oregon State Capitol Park, and paths lead northeast to the Oregon Labor and Industries building and east across the park to the building that houses the office of the Oregon Secretary of State and formerly housed the Oregon Chief Education Office. The Wall of Water fountain is directly to the southeast at the edge of the park, and the Fallen Worker Memorial and Sprague Fountain are to the northeast. St. Joseph's Catholic Church is to the northwest on the other side of Winter Street. The State Capitol building is across Court Street to the south, and in the State Capitol park directly to the southwest of the State Library are the Walk of Flags, Capitol Beaver Family, and Liberty Bell.

The current State Library building was dedicated in 1939. It was the first building to be constructed on what is today known as the Capitol Mall, and was completed only two years after the dedication of the Oregon State Capitol in 1937. The State Library Building was extensively renovated in the 1990s. It was listed on the National Register of Historic Places in 2022.

== Gallery ==
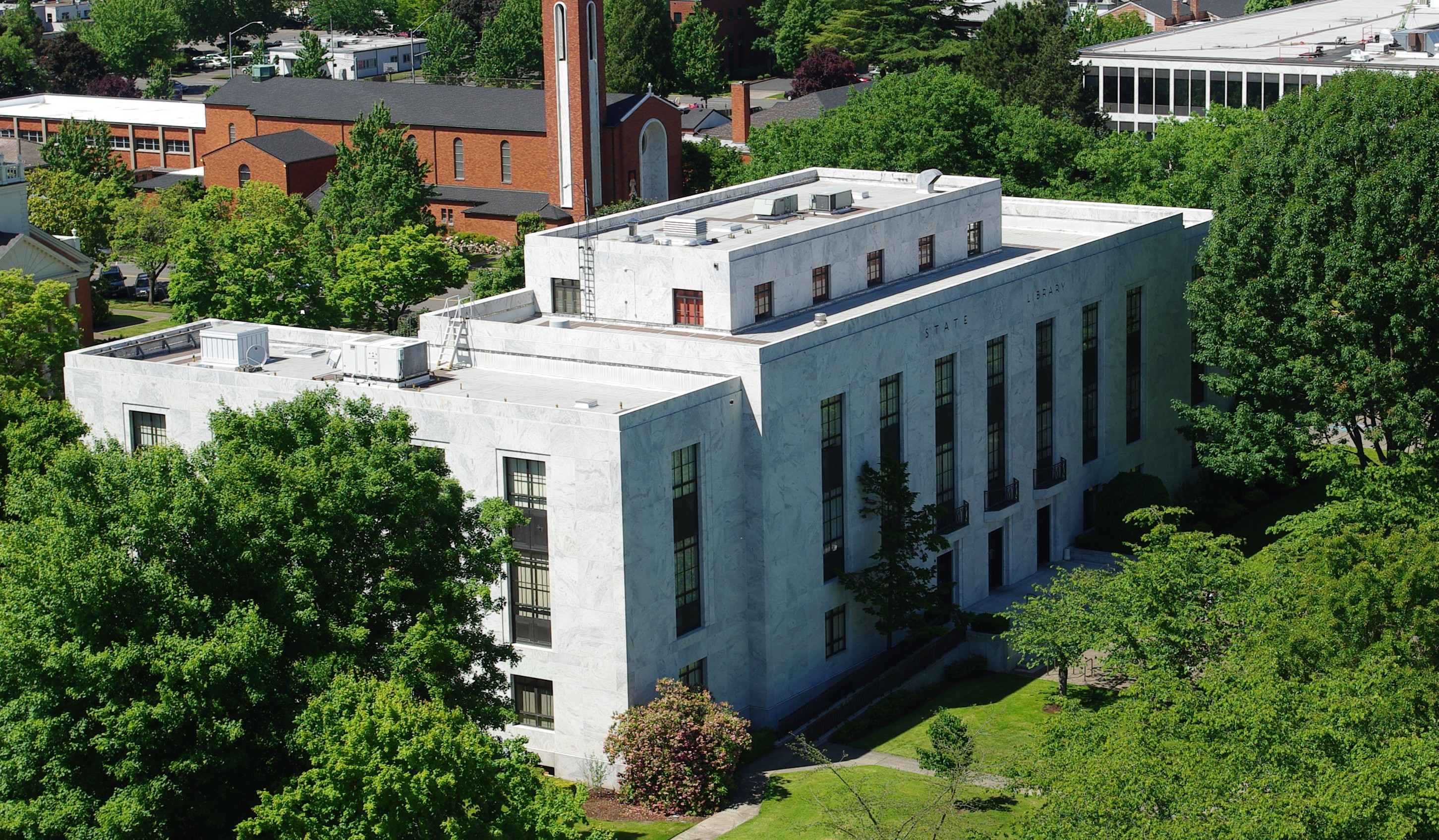
Aerial view, south side of the building, 2008

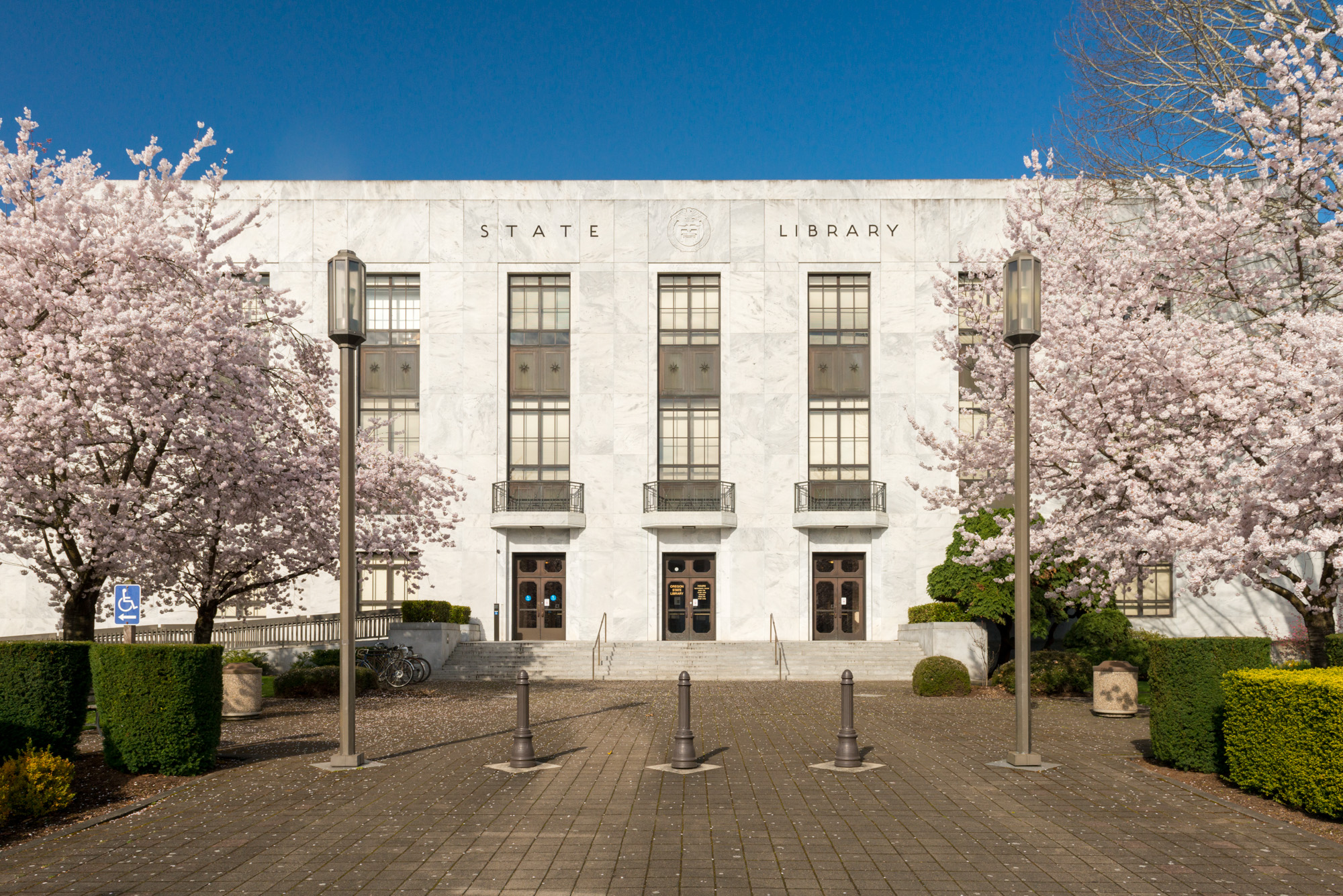
The historic front doors on the East side of the building, viewed from the Oregon State Capitol Park, 2014

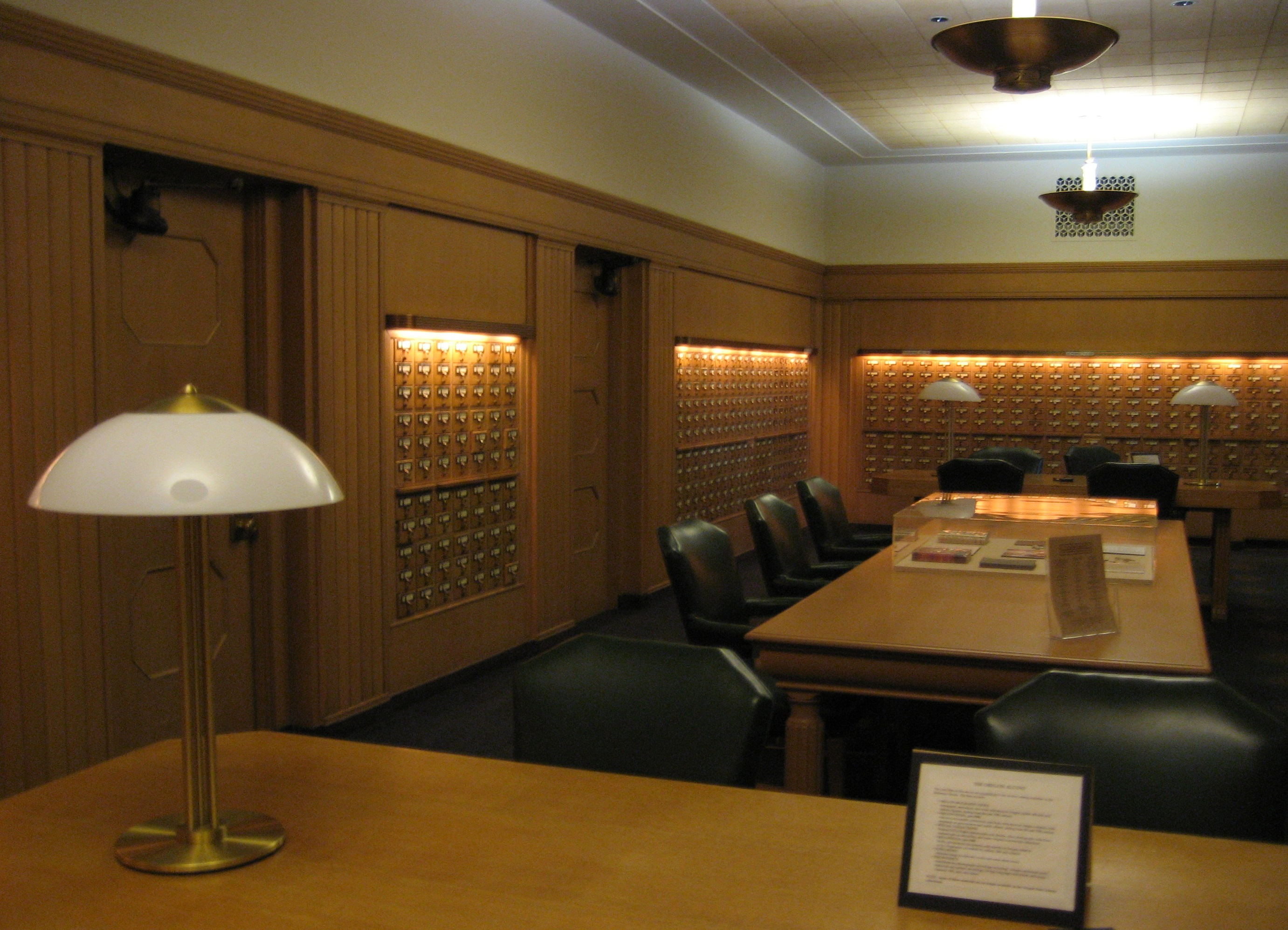
A card catalog at the library

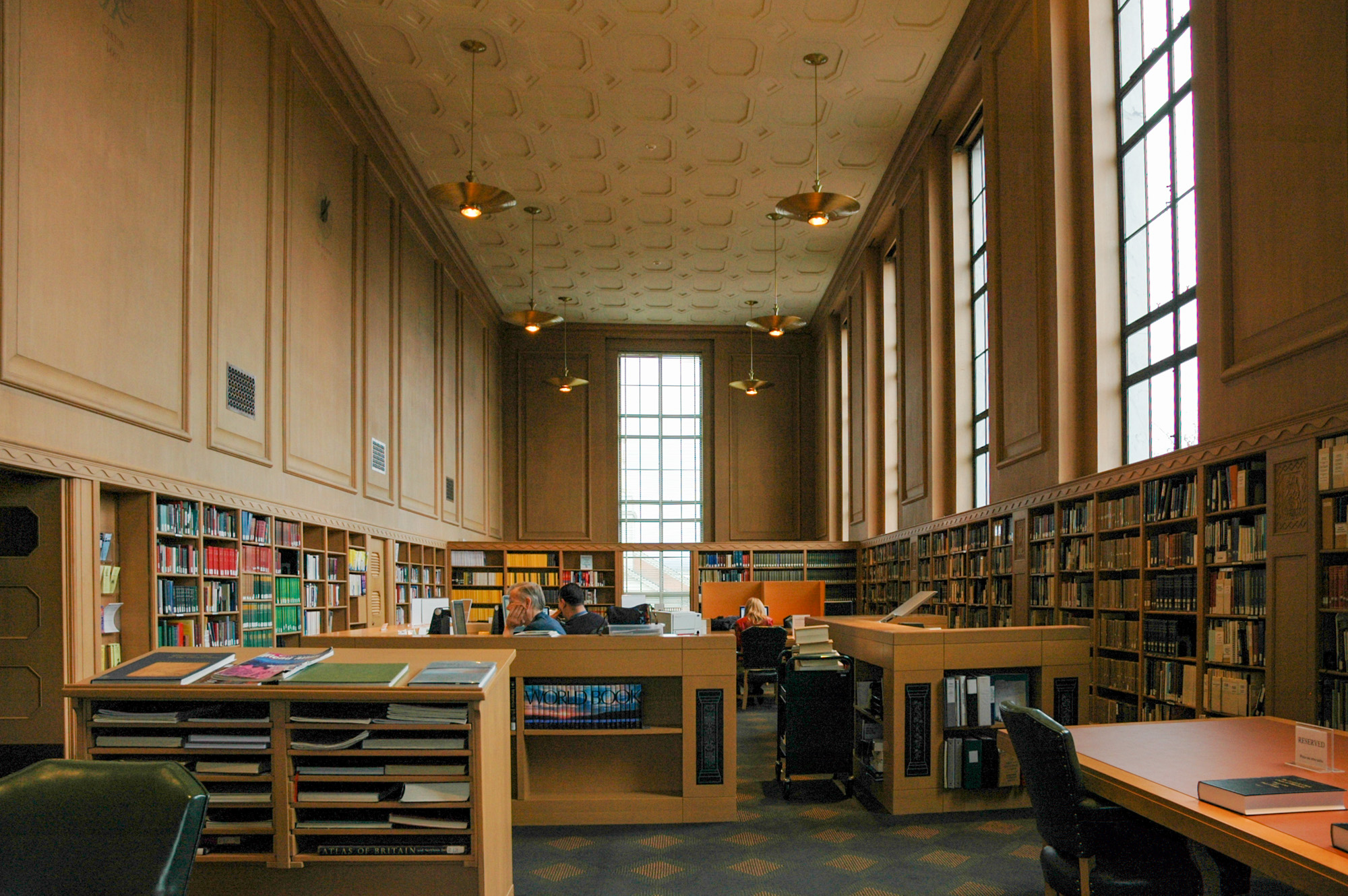
The reference room, 2006

== See also ==
- List of libraries in Oregon
- List of libraries in the United States
- List of national and state libraries
- Mark O. Hatfield Library
- Oregon Battle of the Books
- Oregon Historical Society
- Oregon Library Association
- Parish L. Willis
- Salem Public Library (Oregon)
- Willamette Heritage Center
