= Walter Rice =

Walter Rice may refer to:

- Walter Rice (architect) (1866–1930), an American architect, inventor and engineer
- Walter Rice (MP), Welsh MP for Carmarthen
- Walter Rice, 7th Baron Dynevor (1873-1856)
- Walter Francis Rice, Lieutenant Governor of Burma
- Walter Herbert Rice (born 1937) American judge
