= Eastern Oregon University =

Public university in La Grande, Oregon, US

- Former names: Eastern Oregon Normal School (1929–1939); Eastern Oregon College of Education (1939–1956); Eastern Oregon College (1956–1973); Eastern Oregon State College (1973–1997)
- Type: Public university
- Established: 1929; 97 years ago
- Accreditation: NWCCU
- Academic affiliations: HECC; Space-grant
- Endowment: $16.1 million (2021)
- President: Kelly Ryan
- Provost: Peter Geissinger
- Faculty: 131
- Students: 2,798 (Fall 2023)
- Undergraduates: 2,515 (Fall 2023)
- Postgraduates: 283 (Fall 2023)
- Location: La Grande, Oregon, United States; 45.320°N 118.092°W
- Campus: 110 acres (0.45 km^{2}); Remote town
- Other campuses: Bend; Burns; Enterprise; Gresham; Hermiston; John Day; Ontario; Pendleton; Clackamas; Roseburg; Salem
- Newspaper: The Voice
- Colors: Gold and navy blue
- Nickname: Mountaineers
- Sporting affiliations: NAIA – Cascade; Frontier
- Mascot: Monty the Mountaineer
- Website: eou.edu
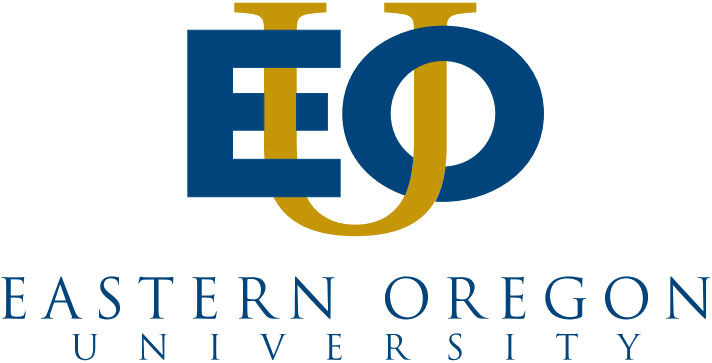

Eastern Oregon University (EOU) (officially designated as Oregon’s Rural University) is a public university in La Grande, Oregon. It was formerly part of the since dissolved Oregon University System. EOU was founded in 1929 as a teacher’s college. The university offers bachelor's and master's degrees. The school's athletic teams, the Mountaineers, are members of the Cascade and Frontier conferences of the NAIA.

== History ==
EOU opened its doors in 1929 as "Eastern Oregon Normal School", a teacher training school. The first building on campus was Inlow Hall, later incorporating the former Ackerman Elementary School in 1936. The school built dormitories for female students in 1938 (Dorian Hall) followed residences for men in 1947 (Hunt Hall). In 1939, the Oregon Legislature changed the name to "Eastern Oregon College of Education", and the words "of Education" were dropped from the college's name in 1956. The library was added in 1951, and Quinn Coliseum opened in 1958.

The radio station KEOL started in 1972 and the Hoke College Center was completed the next year. The 1973 Legislature changed EOC's name to "Eastern Oregon State College". In 1980 Inlow Hall (then known as the Administrative Building) was added to the National Register of Historic Places. Later in the 1980s the college added the football stadium (Community Stadium in 1984) and Loso Hall (1989). In 1997, Eastern Oregon State College became "Eastern Oregon University", just as the state renamed Oregon's other regional schools to Western Oregon University and Southern Oregon University.

In 2013 the Oregon University System began the process of creating independent boards for certain schools, including Oregon State and the University of Oregon. On June 30, 2015, the Oregon University System was dissolved and on July 1, 2015, the Eastern Oregon University Board of Trustees took on governance of the institution. The university removed the name Pierce from the library in November 2020, which had been named for former governor Walter M. Pierce and his wife Cornelia Marvin Pierce due to the governor's views on race. On Tuesday May 9, 2023 the EOU Board of Trustees voted unanimously to name Kelly A. Ryan as the university's 13th president.

== Campus setting ==
EOU's location in La Grande is in the heart of the Blue Mountain range between Portland, Oregon and Boise, Idaho just off Interstate 84. Driving to La Grande takes approximately four hours from Portland, two and half from Boise, five from Seattle, and four from Spokane. As of 2021 EOU has a 98% acceptance rate. The college also has centers across Oregon in Bend, Burns, Enterprise, the Portland area, Hermiston, John Day, Ontario, Pendleton, Roseburg, and Salem.

The campus contains 26 buildings; both the living facilities – Alikut Hall and Daugherty Hall – are co-ed. Inlow Hall, Eastern's administration building, is listed on the National Register of Historic Places.

=== Gallery ===
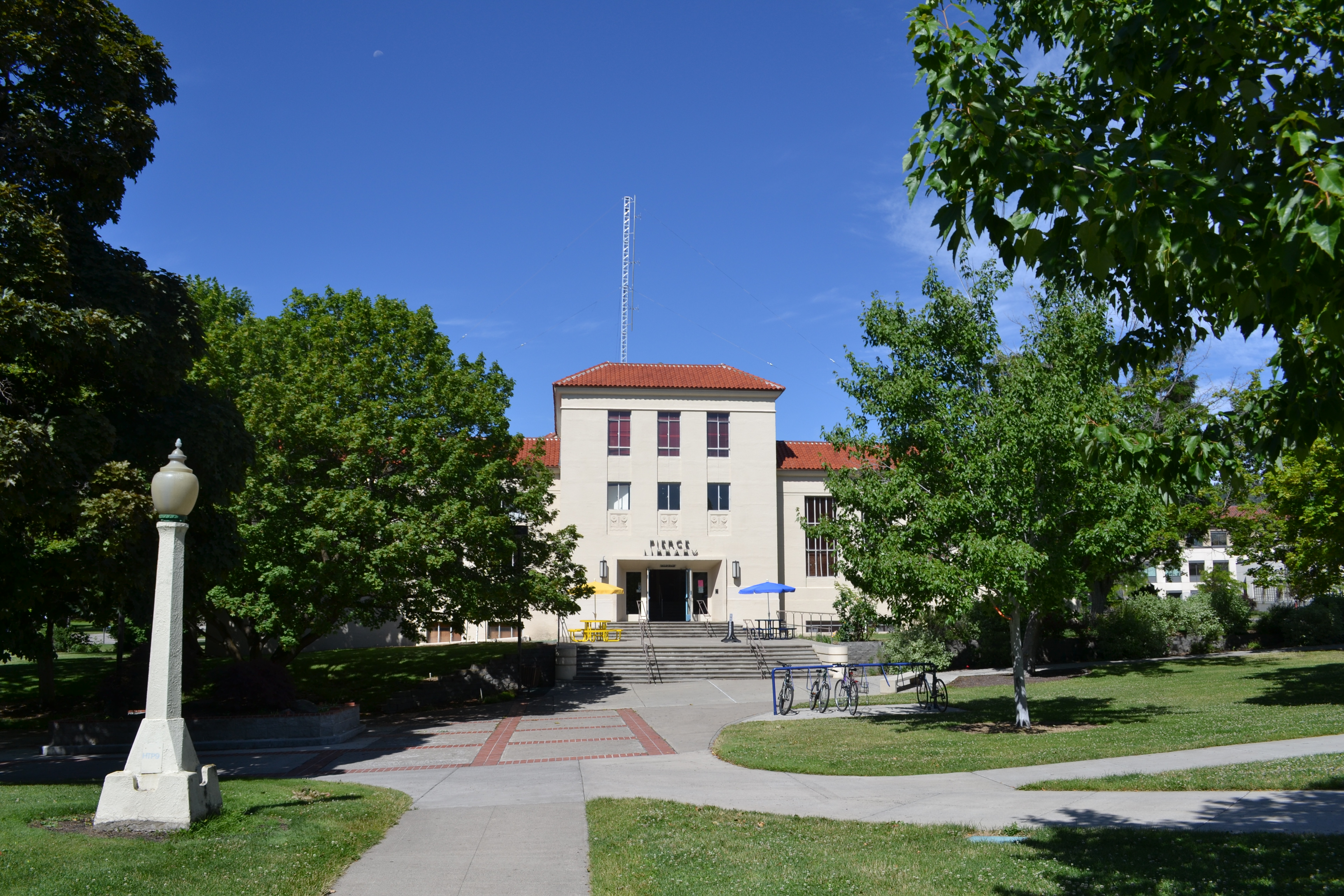
Library

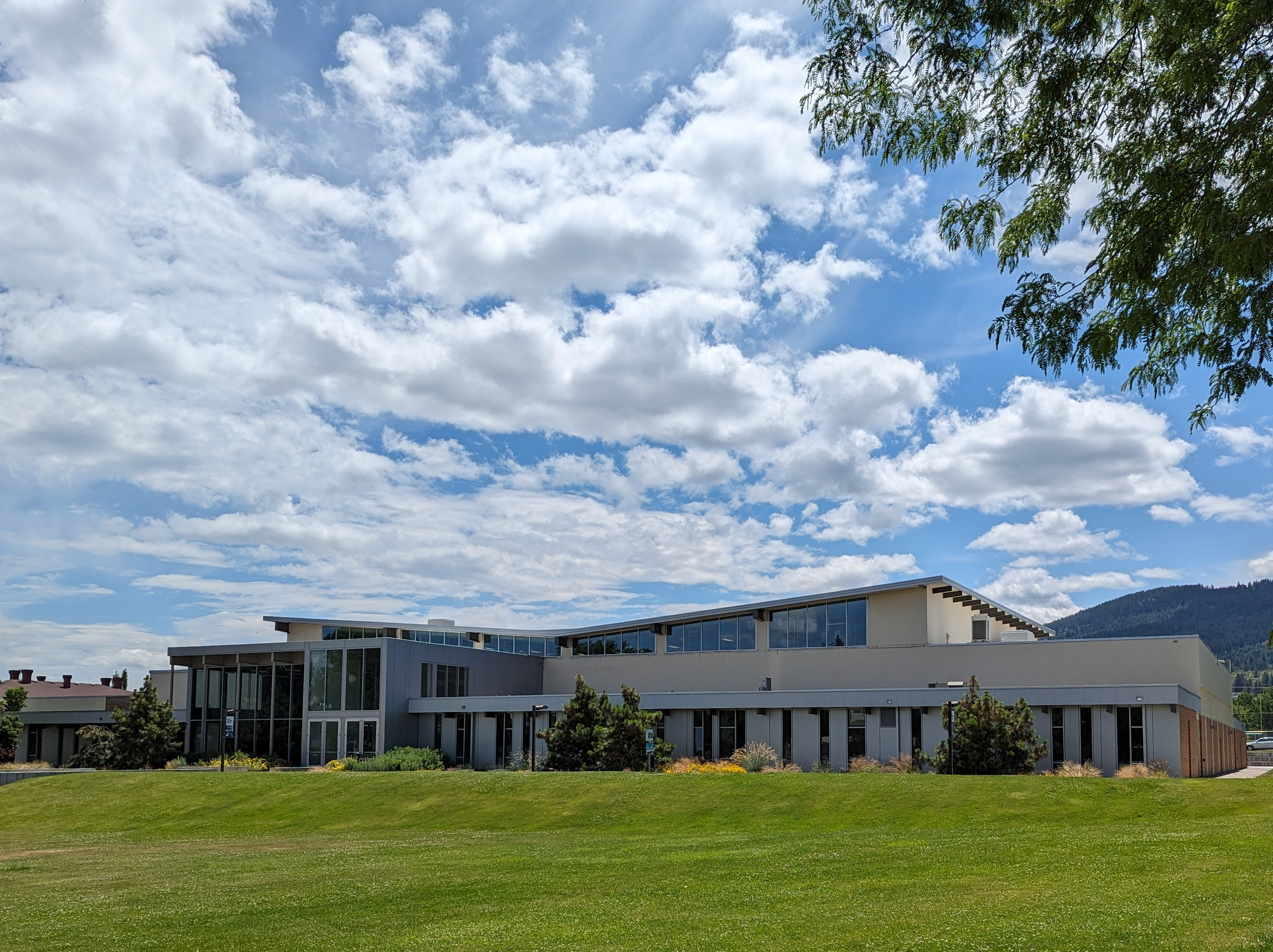
Quinn Coliseum

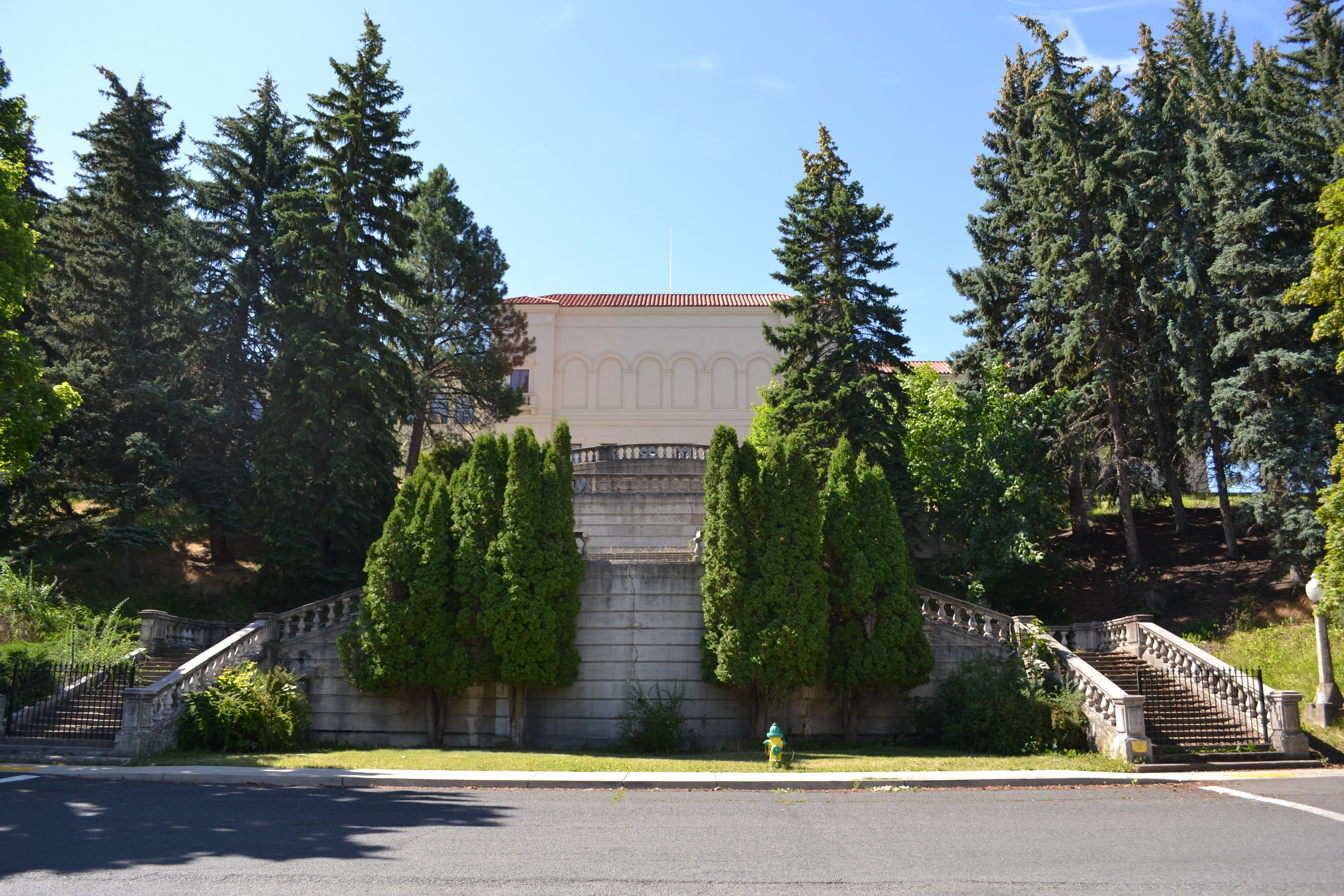
Grand Staircase

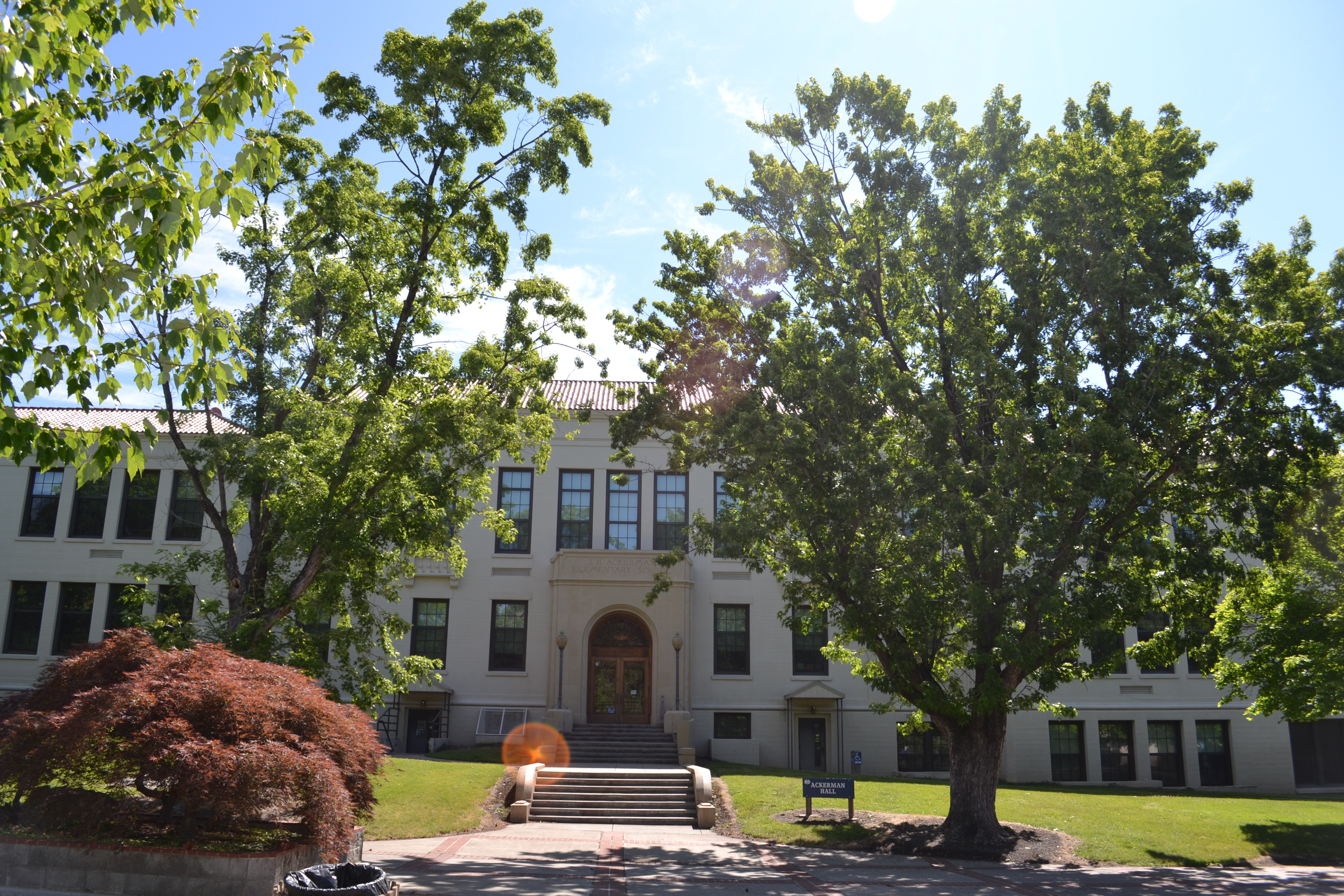
Ackerman Hall

== Academics ==
Undergraduate demographics as of Fall 2023
| Race and ethnicity | Total |
|---|---|
| White | 69% |
| Hispanic | 14% |
| Two or more races | 5% |
| Unknown | 4% |
| Native Hawaiian/Pacific Islander | 3% |
| Black | 2% |
| American Indian/Alaska Native | 2% |
| Asian | 1% |
| International student | 1% |
Economic diversity
| Low-income (Note: The percentage of students who received an income-based federal Pell grant intended for low-income students.) | 39% |
| Affluent (Note: The percentage of students who are a part of the American middle class at the bare minimum.) | 61% |

Academic programs at Eastern Oregon University offer the opportunity to learn in a small classroom setting in rural Oregon. With four colleges, students can choose from more than 30 academic programs, including sciences, humanities, teaching, and business. New programming in vocational fields such as Fire Services Administration and Global Foods and Agribusiness target regional employment needs.

=== Academic organization ===
EOU offers bachelor's degrees and the degrees of MPA, MFA, MBA, Master of Education and Master of Arts in Teaching. The university offers business and elementary education programs at a satellite campus in Gresham, Oregon.

The school is composed of the following colleges:

- College of Business
- College of STEM & Health Sciences
- College of Arts & Social Sciences
- College of Education

In addition, programs in Agriculture, in cooperation with Oregon State University, and the baccalaureate degree in Nursing through the Oregon Health & Sciences University are offered on this campus. Many degrees are available fully online.

=== Tuition ===
EOU’s tuition and fees average thousands less than other public and private institutions in the surrounding region. The Economist recently ranked EOU among the best value colleges in the Northwest for return-on-investment. Additionally, EOU offers in-state tuition for Western Undergraduate Exchange (WUE) residents. Students from the Commonwealth of the Northern Mariana Islands and Guam are eligible for the WUE rate. Transfer students can also receive this benefit.

=== Accreditation ===
The university has been accredited by the Northwest Commission on Colleges and Universities and its predecessor entities since 1931. The school's bachelor and masters business programs are accredited by the International Assembly for Collegiate Business Education IACBE.

== Athletics ==
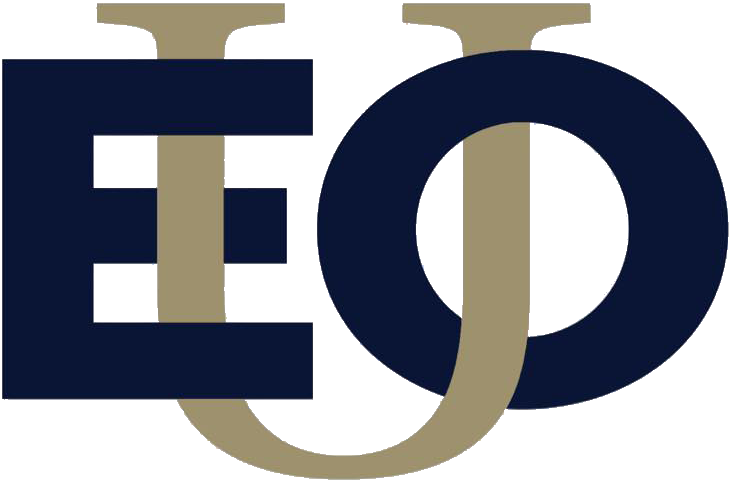
EOU athletics logo

The Eastern Oregon athletic teams are called the Mountaineers. The university is a member of the National Association of Intercollegiate Athletics (NAIA), primarily competing in the Cascade Collegiate Conference (CCC) for most of its sports since the 1993–94 academic year; while its football team competes in the Frontier Conference (but had previously competed as an Independent in the NCAA Division III ranks until the 2004 fall season).

Eastern Oregon competes in 15 intercollegiate varsity sports: Men's sports include baseball (2019), basketball, cross country, football, soccer, track & field (indoor and outdoor), and wrestling; while women's sports include basketball, cross country, lacrosse (2019), soccer, softball, track & field (indoor and outdoor), volleyball and wrestling.

== Notable alumni ==
- Fouad Ajami, professor, Middle East expert and political advisor
- Stephen H. Anderson, federal judge
- Cliff Bentz, member of the United States House of Representatives
- Jace Billingsley, NFL football player
- Rod Chandler, U.S. Representative from the state of Washington
- Kiara Fontanilla, soccer player for the Philippines women's national team.
- Tyronne Gross, former NFL football player
- Josie Heath, activist and politician in Colorado
- Mike Kyle, wrestler and mixed martial artist in the UFC
- Aren Palik, Vice President of the Federated States of Micronesia
- David Panuelo, President of the Federated States of Micronesia
- William De Los Santos, author, poet, screenwriter and movie director (enrolled as William Hilbert)

=== The oldest graduate ===
99-year-old Leo Plass received his degree in June 2011, setting a world record. He had dropped out less than one semester away from graduation in 1932 and started a career as a logger. He died in August 2015, shortly after his 104th birthday.
