= Wisconsin Library Association =

American nonprofit professional organization

The Wisconsin Library Association (WLA), is a Wisconsin, United States non-profit, professional membership organization which has existed since 1891. WLA represents nearly 2000 members statewide --- primarily librarians and library staff from school, public, academic, and special libraries, in addition to students, trustees and library Friends. Because of its broad membership base, WLA is concerned with the needs of all types of libraries in the state. Based in Madison, Wisconsin, WLA is a chapter of the American Library Association.

== Programs and services ==
- Conferences and workshops on a wide range of library issues

- Networking and leadership opportunities available within more than 20 special interest units, including the Wisconsin Library Trustee & Friends; Association of Wisconsin Special Librarians; Wisconsin Association of Public Libraries; and the Wisconsin Association of Academic Librarians

- Unified statewide advocacy for libraries, including an annual Library Legislative Day, co-sponsored by the Wisconsin Educational Media & Technology Association.

- Awards and scholarship programs

- Online Membership Directory, listing approximately 2,000 members, plus other library community contacts

- Automatic WLA Foundation membership to all WLA members. The Wisconsin Library Association Foundation (WLAF), the charitable arm of the WLA, conducts the Campaign for Wisconsin Libraries, awards continuing and library education scholarships, and carries out other programs in support of Wisconsin libraries.

== History ==
In 1882, Theresa West Elmendorf, Deputy Librarian of the Milwaukee Public Library, became the first member of the American Library Association from Wisconsin. After attending the 1890 American Library Association conference and learning of the creation of state library associations in some Eastern states, she returned to Wisconsin and began promoting a Wisconsin state library association. This idea came to fruition on February 11, 1891, when she, along with Reuben Gold Thwaites, Edward Asahel Birge (Madison Public Library Board member), and Frank Avery Hutchins, gathered in the office of the State Superintendent of Public Instruction to organize the Wisconsin Library Association.

The WLA and its successor, the Wisconsin Free Library Commission (WLFC) established in 1895, were the main bodies promoting the establishment and improvement of public libraries in Wisconsin, seeing libraries as essential to the intellectual and moral development of children and young adults.

Today's Wisconsin Library Association consists of over 2000 members who represent many kinds of libraries and library staff, including public, academic, school, and special libraries, as well as friends of the library, trustees, and other community members and corporate library supporters.

== Publications ==
The WLA publishes a quarterly newsletter (January, April, July, and October) that reflects the purposes and responsibilities of the association and reports the activities and developments of the library profession in addition to keeping members informed about the organization’s current activities and initiatives. Other WLA communications include e-news reports, blog postings, Twitter updates, and online bulletin boards.

== See also ==
- List of libraries in the United States
