= Donald Knapp =

American politician (1932–2022)

Member of the Iowa House of Representatives
- In office 1981–1993

Personal details
- Born: March 20, 1932 Monticello, Iowa, U.S.
- Died: July 2, 2022 (aged 90) Cascade, Iowa, U.S.
- Party: Democratic
- Occupation: Corrections

Donald J. Knapp (March 20, 1932 – July 2, 2022) was an American politician in the state of Iowa.

== Life and career ==
Knapp was born in Monticello, Iowa, on March 20, 1932. He attended Kirkwood Community College and the University of Iowa and worked in corrections. Knapp served in the Iowa House of Representatives from 1981 to 1993, as a Democrat. He died at his home in Cascade, Iowa, on July 2, 2022, at the age of 90.
