= Eppich Apartments =

- U.S. National Register of Historic Places
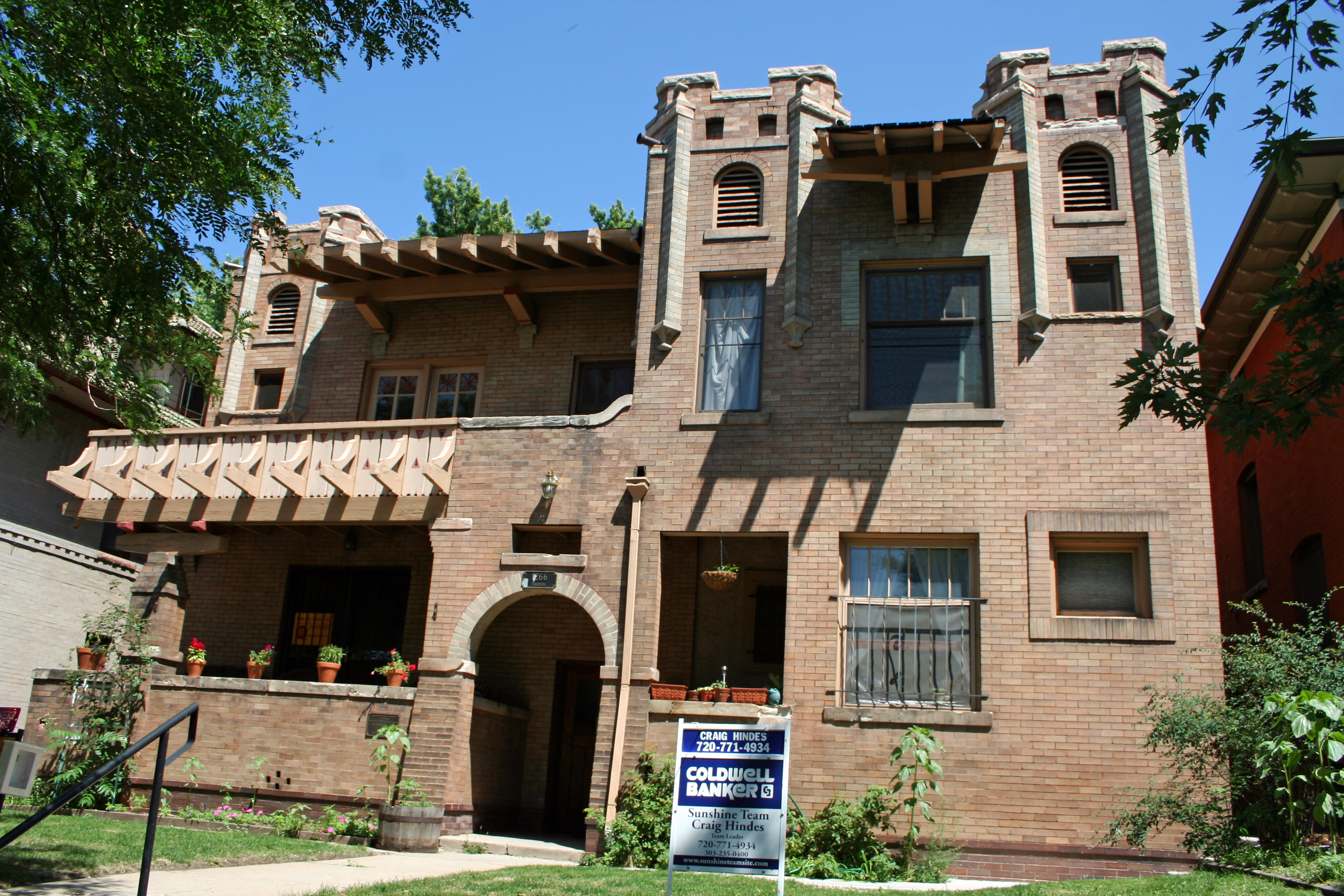
- Front view of the apartments

- Location within Colorado Location within the United States
- Location: 1266 Emerson Street, Denver, Colorado
- Coordinates: 39°44′10.95″N 104°58′34.17″W
- Built: 1909
- Architect: Walter Rice
- Architectural style: American Craftsman
- NRHP reference No.: 84000813
- Added to NRHP: January 5, 1984

Eppich Apartments is an apartment building in Denver, Colorado. The American Craftsman building was designed by Walter Rice, a Denver architect and built by Louis F. Eppich, a Denver real-estate developer. The towers and parapets reflect a medieval influence. The second-floor balconies at the front of the house have oriental elements of design in the intricate frame with butterfly beams. There are also Spanish Colonial design elements in the corbeled pylon and terra-cotta drain pipe. It was built facing the view of the Rocky Mountains and the Colorado State Capitol building, which now also includes Denver's high-rise buildings. Eppich owned the building until 1953. It was listed on the National Register of Historic Places on January 5, 1984.
