= Cornwall Apartments =

- U.S. National Register of Historic Places
- Colorado State Register of Historic Properties
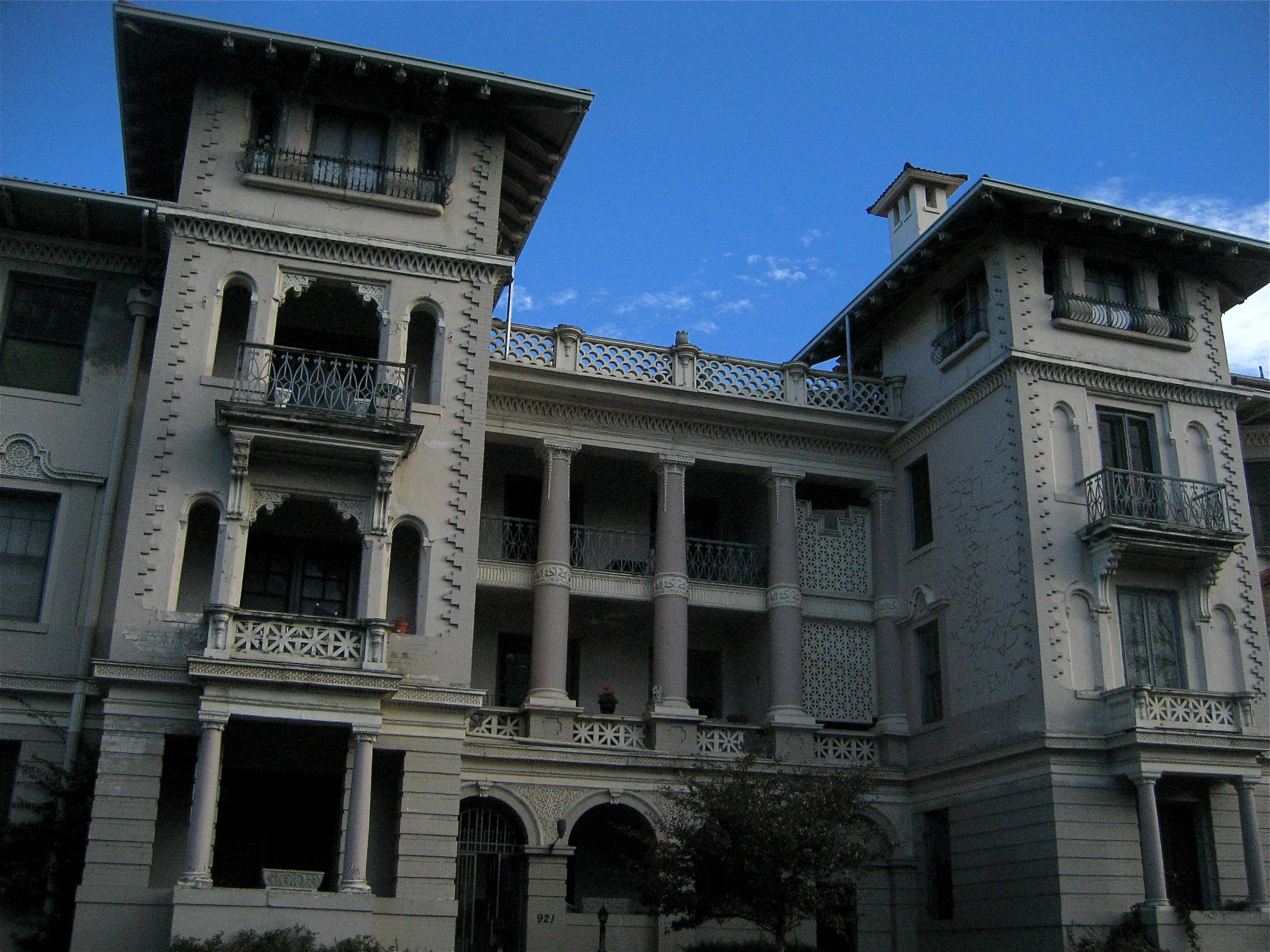
- Front view of the apartments

- Location within Colorado Location within the United States
- Location: 1317 Ogden St., 921 E. 13th Ave., Denver, Colorado, United States
- Coordinates: 39°44′13″N 104°57′49″W
- Built: 1901
- Architect: Walter Rice
- Architectural style: Mexican Colonial
- NRHP reference No.: 76000550
- CSRHP No.: 5DV.183
- Added to NRHP: October 8, 1976

The Cornwall Apartments is a building on the National Register of Historic Places in the Capitol Hill section of Denver, Colorado. The apartments were designed by Denver architect Walter Rice in a Mexican colonial style that capturing a cosmopolitan spirit and gaiety in the unusual architectural elements for 1900, such as its balustrades, mouldings, and varied balconies. Reed made most of the terra cotta trim himself.

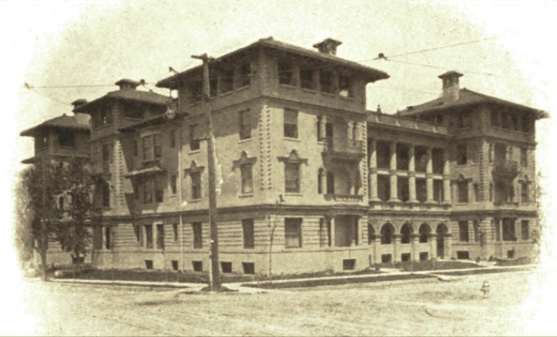
Cornwall Apartments, Denver, Colorado in 1903

It may have been the first building of a Spanish-derived architectural style. Other houses of the time were generally of Victorian and European architectural styles. Other architects and designers found that the Spanish style is more appropriate for Colorado's climate. The three-storied building has 21 apartments, a roof garden and full basement. A former ballroom has been in the north tower has repurposed as a penthouse apartment. The other towers were used as "summer gardens". In 1901, the building was described as "the handsomest structure on the Hill" by the Rocky Mountain News.

The building's first owner, William T. Cornwall, was a Denver Fire Clay Company executive and a local real estate developer. The building is now condominiums, and the exterior was renovated in 2010.
