= Gurney's Seed and Nursery Company =

American mail-order seed and garden company

- Type: Privately Held
- Industry: Mail-Order Seed and Nursery
- Founded: 1866 Monticello, Iowa USA
- Headquarters: Greendale, Indiana, USA
- Products: Vegetable seeds, vegetable plants, shrubs, fruit trees, perennials, berries, shade trees, ground covers
- Website: gurneys.com

Gurney's Seed and Nursery Co. is a mail-order seed and garden plant company based in Greendale, Indiana, founded in 1866.

== History ==
Charles W. Gurney (born May 13, 1840) a Lieutenant Colonel during the American Civil War, opened his first nursery, Hesperian Nurseries, in 1866 in Monticello, Iowa. The business remained in Monticello until 1882, when the business was moved to Dixon County, Nebraska. After realizing the trade potential in towns near rivers, Gurney moved Hesperian Nurseries to Yankton, South Dakota, in 1897.

C.W. Gurney's seven sons were very involved in the family seed business, and in 1906, C.W. Gurney and his sons, and one nephew, had the nursery incorporated as Gurney's Seed and Nursery Company. The company started listing products on a generic price list for mailing purposes, until 1910, when Gurney's published its first large seed and nursery catalog with a full-color cover. Upon Charles W. Gurney's death in 1913, his sons and nephew continued the seed and nursery business. In 1919, Deloss Butler Gurney, one of the Colonel's sons, became CEO. The company diversified and grew quickly. By 1924, the Gurney seed house was one of the largest in the world, receiving orders from 46 of the 50 states and many foreign countries.

In 1925, John Chandler Gurney, Deloss Butler's son, made a name for himself as a radio announcer and programmer for the Yankton radio station WNAX. In 1927, John Chandler "Chan" Gurney convinced his father to buy the radio station, which became known as "WNAX - Voice of the House of Gurney in Yankton." The station was used to promote Gurney products and services, making Gurney's a household name.

In the early 1930s, the large Gurney's seed house and storefront became one of Yankton's first shopping centers, housing a retail greenhouse, a barber, a grocery store, a jeweler, a medicine store and a restaurant/hotel. These products and services were all promoted by Chan at WNAX. The company also experiment in the fuel industry in the 1940s and, later, it was active in the home front war effort during World War II.

D.B. Gurney died in 1943, but the business sustained. D.B.'s son, John Chandler Gurney, became involved in politics, and served as a U.S. Senator for the state of South Dakota from 1939 to 1951.

== Products ==
Gurney's line of products includes vegetable and flower seeds, gardening supplies and nursery stock, including trees, shrubs, perennials, fruit trees and berries, fertilizers and plant foods.

Focusing on continuing the legacy and objectives of C.W. Gurney, Gurney's targets home orchard enthusiasts and beginners alike. The horticulture experts at Gurney's regularly seek out vegetables and fruits that combine taste with disease resistance, yield and ease of planting. Some of Gurney's popular exclusive home gardening produce varieties, available only to Gurney's customers, include Gurney's Gotta Have It Sweet corn, Gurney's Burpless Hybrid Cucumber, Gurney's Giant Magic Hybrid Pumpkin, Gurney's Pride Hybrid Zucchini and Gurney Girl Tomatoes.

Today, Gurney's continues as one of the leading seed and nursery companies in the United States, having provided customers with seeds and nursery products for over 130 years. Many of Gurney's best-sellers are unique hybrid seeds and plants including the OH My seedless muscadine grape.
