= Oregon Library Association =

Professional organization for Oregon's librarians

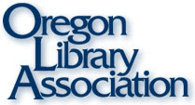
- OLA Logo
- Formation: 1940
- Members: over 1000 members
- Website: www.olaweb.org

The Oregon Library Association (OLA) is a professional association based in the U.S. state of Oregon that promotes the advancement of library service through public and professional education and cooperation.

== See also ==
- Oregon State Library
- American Library Association
- List of libraries in Oregon
