= Charles W. Gurney =

American businessman

Charles W. Gurney (May 13, 1840 – March 25, 1913) was an American businessman who founded Gurney's Seed and Nursery Company, an important seed supplier.

== Biography ==
Gurney was born in Massachusetts, and moved to Iowa about 1852. During the American Civil War, he enlisted in the Union army, serving with the 3rd Iowa Infantry, and rose to the rank of lieutenant colonel.

After the war, he opened his first nursery, Hesperian Nurseries, in 1866 in Monticello, Iowa. The business remained in Monticello until 1882, when the business was moved to Dixon County, Nebraska. After realizing the trade potential in towns near rivers, Gurney moved Hesperian Nurseries to Yankton, South Dakota, in 1897.

Gurney's seven sons were very involved in the family seed business. In 1906, C. W. Gurney incorporated the nursery as Gurney's Seed and Nursery Company, with his sons and a nephew as partners. The company listed products on a generic price list for mailing purposes. In 1910, Gurney's published its first large seed and nursery catalog with a full-color cover.

Charles W. Gurney died in Yankton on March 25, 1913.

== Legacy ==
After his death, his sons and nephew continued the seed and nursery business. In 1919, Gurney's son Deloss Butler Gurney ("D.B.") became head. The company diversified and grew quickly. By 1924, Gurney's Seed was one of the largest in the world, receiving orders from 46 of the 48 states and many foreign countries.

Charles Gurney's grandson, John Chandler Gurney (son of D.B.), was U.S. Senator from South Dakota from 1939 to 1951.
