= St. Joseph's Catholic Church (Salem, Oregon) =

Church in Salem, Oregon, U.S.

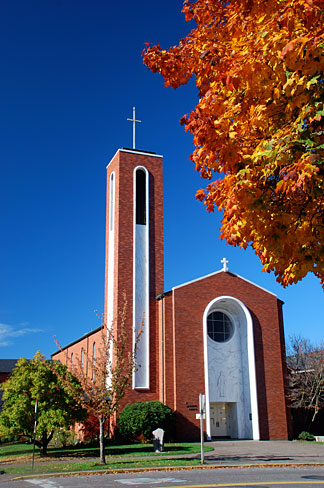
- St. Joseph's Catholic Church
- 44.940995°N 123.031522°W
- Location: Salem, Oregon
- Country: United States
- Denomination: Catholic
- Website: www.stjosephchurch.com

Administration
- Diocese: Archdiocese of Portland

St. Joseph's is the oldest Catholic parish in Salem, Oregon. It currently serves some 3,500 families and conducts services in English, Spanish, Vietnamese, and Latin. The parish school staff has been recognized for excellence in education as recently as 2005.

== History ==
St. Joseph's was founded in 1853 when Father James Croke rented a two-story building on the corner of Church and Chemeketa streets that had been a Masonic hall. Father Croke, an Irish priest (brother of Archbishop Thomas Croke) has been described as "the ubiquitous apostle of Western Oregon".

The Sisters of the Holy Names of Jesus and Mary, a Roman Catholic teaching religious institute arrived in 1863 and bought the building. It became the Sacred Heart Academy dedicated on August 22, 1863 and opened with 80 students on September 7. A church historian has noted that the then pastor Leopold Dieleman, "threw enough holy water on the building to put out a fire" and quotes Father Dieleman as saying, "The devil that day had danced his last polka in the building". The following year St. John Evangelist Church opened on a rise of ground known locally as "Piety Hill".

In 1873, the sisters completed a new academy building on the corner of Center and Cottage Streets. A new church was erected on the corner of Chemeketa and Cottage Streets and was named St. Joseph Church (per the archdiocese history of Oregon the name change was possibly to avoid confusion with another parish named St. John's) and opened in 1889. The parish's current church was dedicated in 1953. A new parish center was completed in 1999. The church was extensively damaged by a fire on August 31, 2023.

== See also ==
- National Register of Historic Places listings in Marion County, Oregon
- Old Garfield School (Salem, Oregon)
- State Library of Oregon
