= KEOL =

- La Grande, Oregon; United States
- Frequency: 91.7 MHz

Programming
- Format: Defunct (formerly "free form")

Ownership
- Owner: Eastern Oregon University

History
- First air date: September 1973
- Last air date: July 19, 2021

Technical information
- Licensing authority: FCC
- Facility ID: 54806
- Class: A
- ERP: 310 watts
- HAAT: -228 meters
- Transmitter coordinates: 45°19′16″N 118°05′26″W

Links
- Public license information: Public file; LMS

KEOL (91.7 FM) was a radio station broadcasting from Eastern Oregon University (EOU) in La Grande, Oregon. KEOL operated at 91.7 MHz with an operating power of 310 watts. Programming on the station, operated primarily by EOU students, was generally freeform rock.

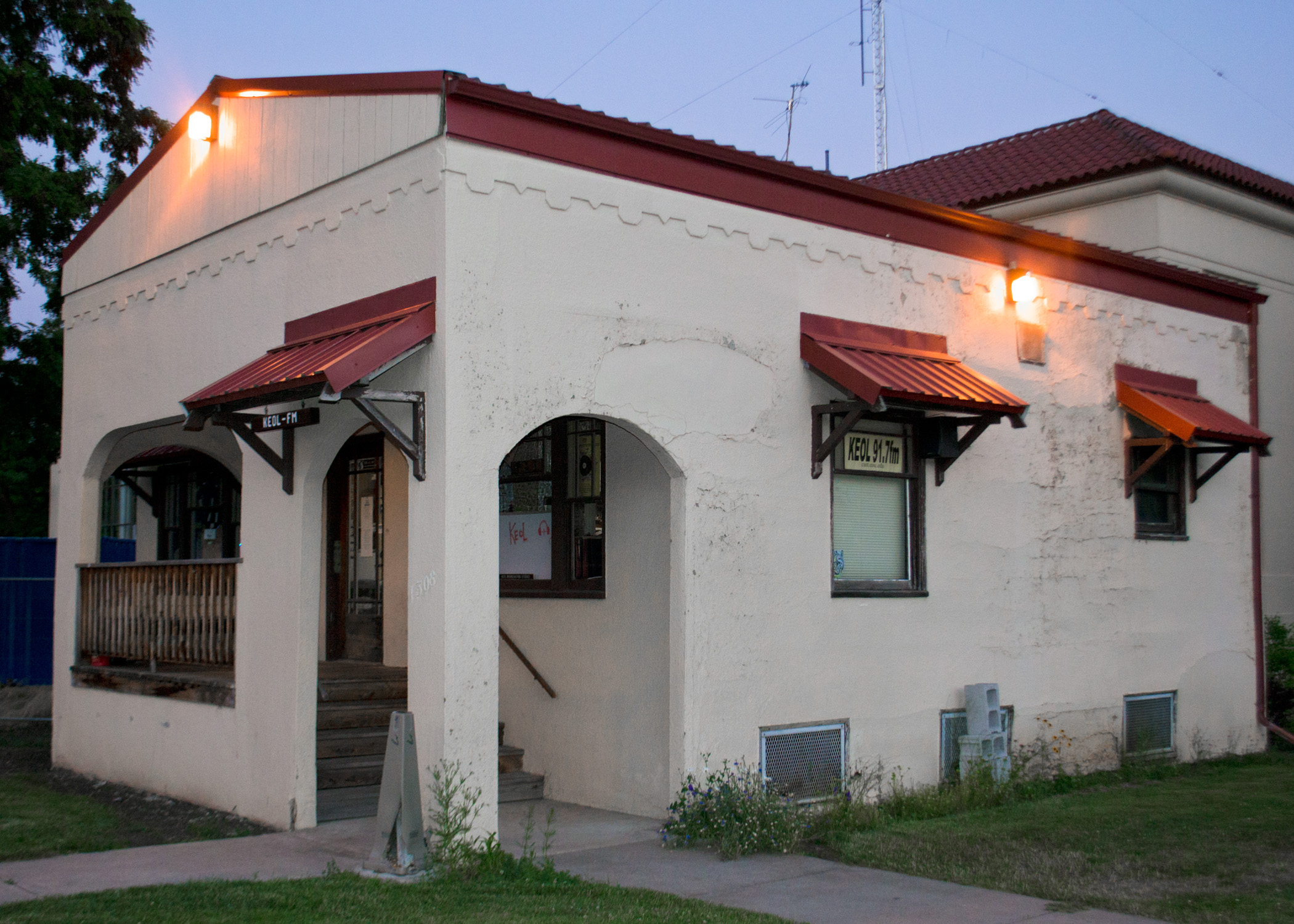

== History ==
KEOL was conceived in early 1967, when two employees of what was then known as Eastern Oregon College envisioned a campus FM radio station offering classical and jazz music—genres not readily available on local radio at that time.

After a construction permit was received on March 1, 1973, it first took to the air that September. The station originally broadcast on a frequency of 91.1 MHz, with 10 watts of power from a Gates tube-fired transmitter.

KEOL was first located in the newly completed Hoke College Center, before moving to the Walter M. Pierce Library in 1976. A second move placed KEOL in a one-story bungalow, with a basement, just north of Pierce Library. In October 2015, the station moved back to Hoke College Center.

KEOL La Grande was operated by the students and faculty of Eastern Oregon University. Staff included a faculty adviser, station manager, program and music directors and assistants. The station was funded by student incidental fees, fundraising activities and underwriting.

At its peak, there were more than 100 DJs on KEOL. That number had dwindled to four by 2021, when a student committee—citing low participation and a shift to digital listening—voted to stop funding the station with incidental fees, resulting in a shutdown at the end of the 2020–2021 academic year. KEOL had received $33,481 a year in student fees. On July 19, 2021, EOU submitted the KEOL license for cancellation. The station's license was reinstated on August 18, 2021, but then surrendered again and cancelled on October 18, 2023.

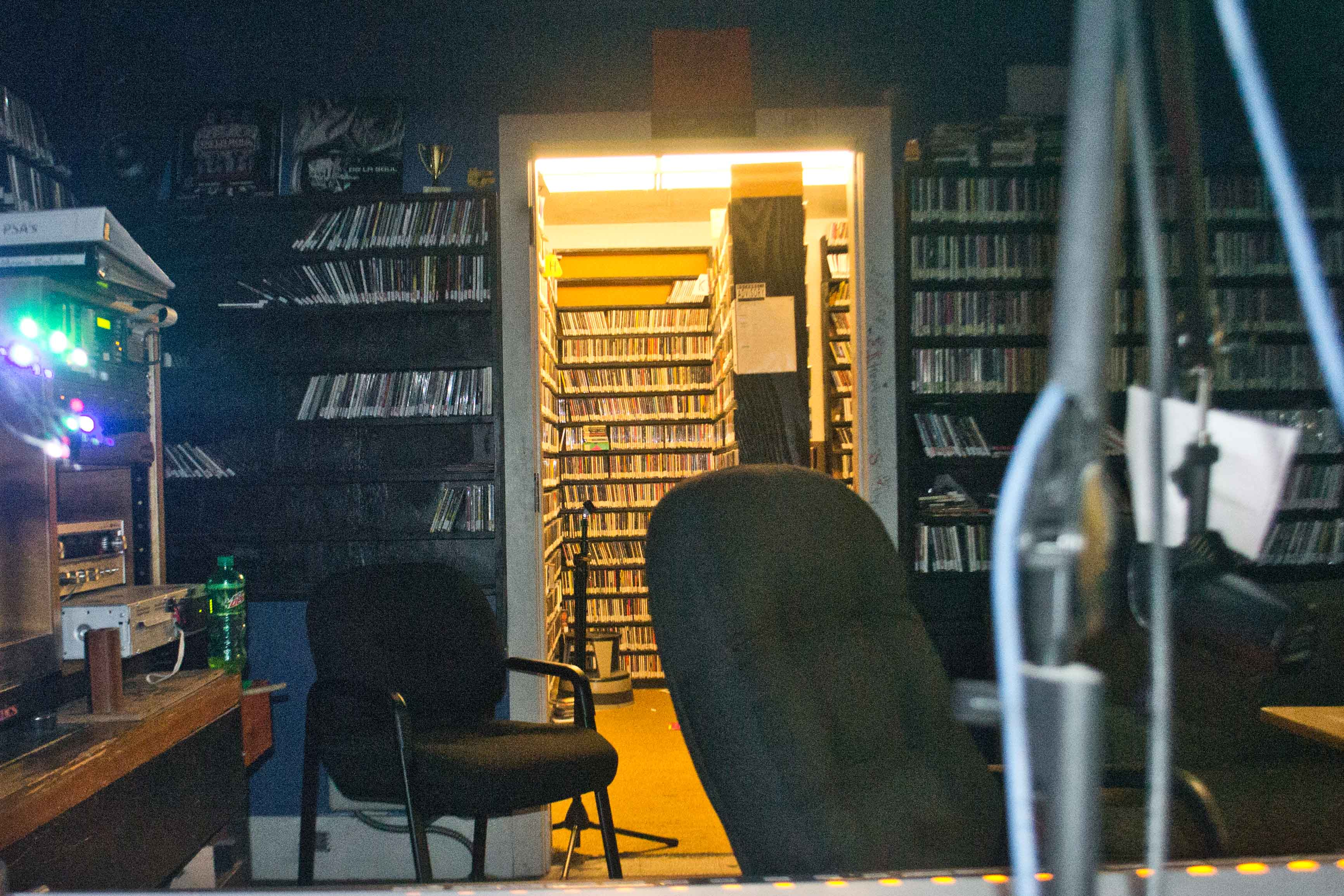

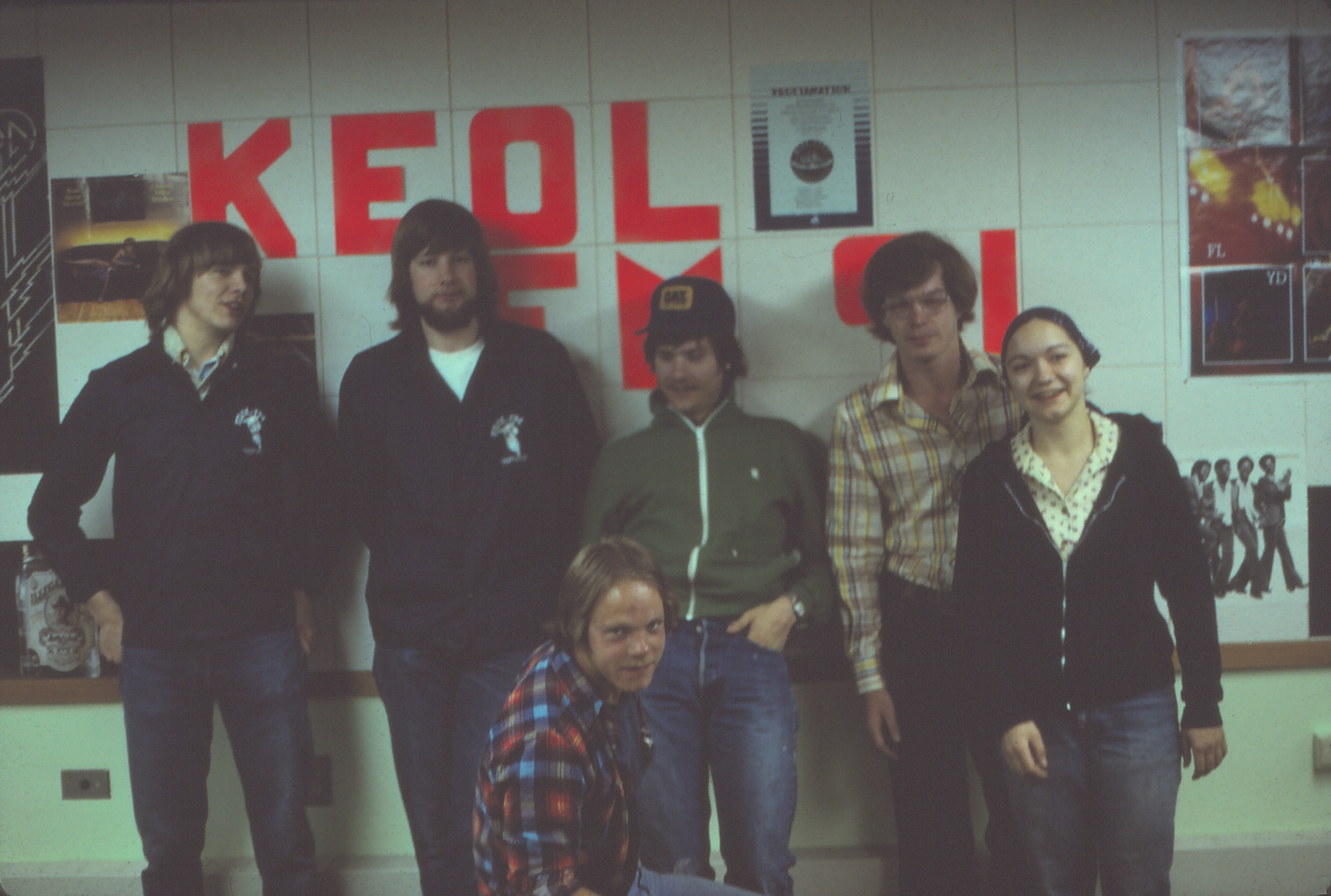
