= Monticello, Iowa =

- City
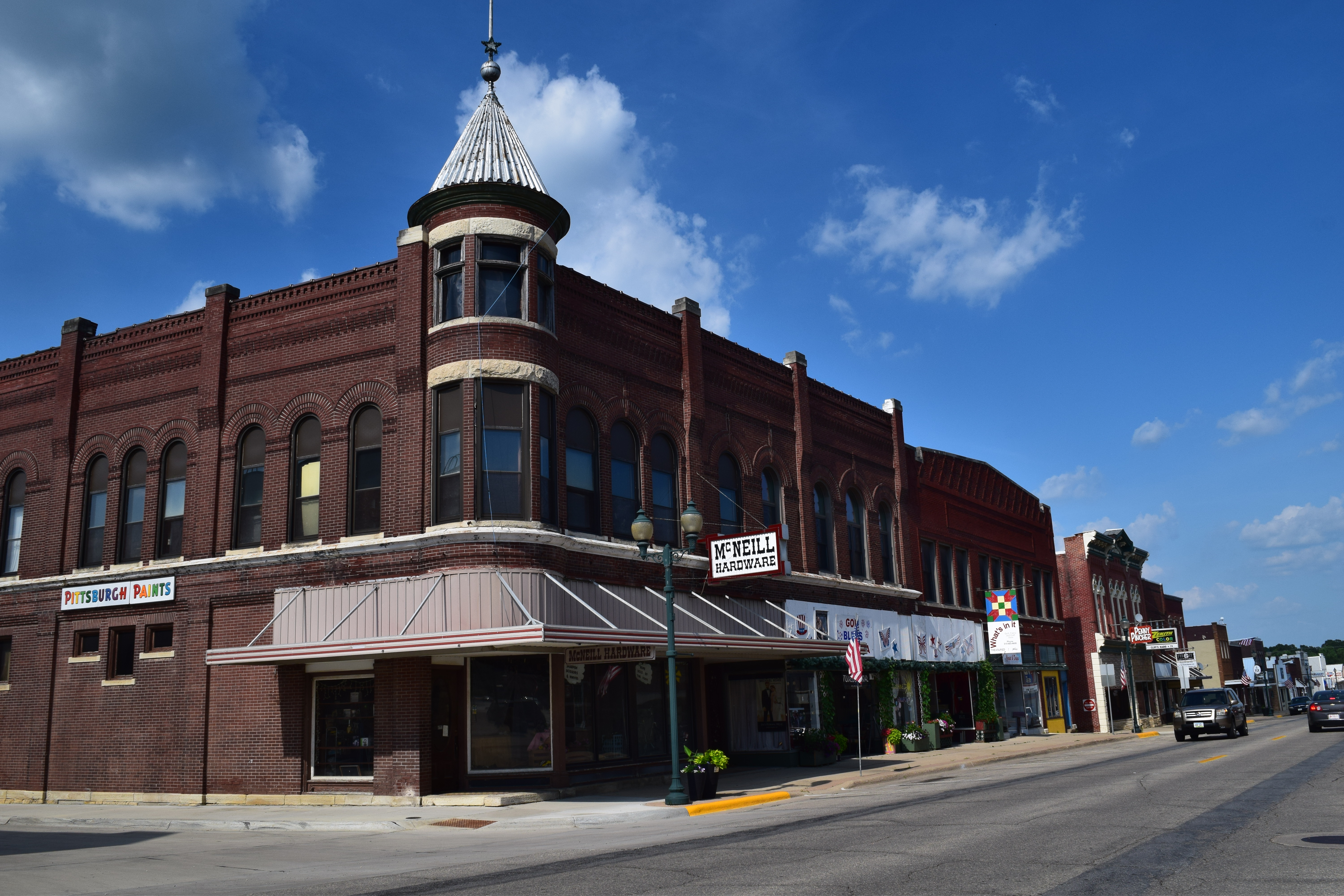
- Looking east in downtown Monticello (2020)

- Flag

- Location within Jones County and Iowa
- Coordinates: 42°14′20″N 91°11′21″W
- Country: United States
- State: Iowa
- County: Jones
- Incorporated: September 24, 1889

Area
  - Total: 5.56 sq mi (14.40 km^{2})
  - Land: 5.53 sq mi (14.31 km^{2})
  - Water: 0.031 sq mi (0.08 km^{2})
- Elevation: 824 ft (251 m)

Population (2020)
  - Total: 4,040
  - Density: 731/sq mi (282/km^{2})
- Time zone: UTC-6 (Central (CST))
  - Summer (DST): UTC-5 (CDT)
- ZIP code: 52310
- Area code: 319
- FIPS code: 19-53625
- GNIS ID: 2395386
- Website: City Website

Monticello is a city in Jones County, Iowa, United States. As of the 2020 census, the city population was 4,040.

== Geography ==
Monticello is located at 42°14′20″N 91°11′21″W (42.238759, -91.189067). According to the United States Census Bureau, the city has a total area of 6.33 square miles (16.39 km^{2}), of which 6.29 square miles (16.29 km^{2}) is land and 0.04 square miles (0.10 km^{2}) is water. Monticello is 824 feet above sea level.

For many years, U.S. Route 151 passed directly through Monticello. In 2004, a four-lane bypass around Monticello was completed and opened. As a result, the highway was moved approximately one mile east of the previous route.

== Demographics ==
Historical populations
| Year | Pop. | ±% |
|---|---|---|
| 1870 | 1,337 | — |
| 1880 | 1,877 | +40.4% |
| 1890 | 1,938 | +3.2% |
| 1900 | 2,104 | +8.6% |
| 1910 | 2,043 | −2.9% |
| 1920 | 2,257 | +10.5% |
| 1930 | 2,259 | +0.1% |
| 1940 | 2,546 | +12.7% |
| 1950 | 2,888 | +13.4% |
| 1960 | 3,190 | +10.5% |
| 1970 | 3,509 | +10.0% |
| 1980 | 3,641 | +3.8% |
| 1990 | 3,522 | −3.3% |
| 2000 | 3,607 | +2.4% |
| 2010 | 3,796 | +5.2% |
| 2020 | 4,040 | +6.4% |
Source:"U.S. Census website". United States Census Bureau. and Iowa Data Center; Source: U.S. Decennial Census

Monticello is part of the Cedar Rapids Metropolitan Statistical Area.

=== 2020 census ===
As of the 2020 census, there were 4,040 people, 1,697 households, and 985 families residing in the city. The median age was 42.5 years, and 20.6% of residents were under the age of 18. The population density was 731.0 inhabitants per square mile (282.2/km^{2}).

Age distribution was 4.5% from 20 to 24, 24.8% from 25 to 44, 24.1% from 45 to 64, and 24.3% age 65 or older. The gender makeup of the city was 50.2% male and 49.8% female. For every 100 females there were 100.8 males, and for every 100 females age 18 and over there were 100.4 males age 18 and over.

There were 1,843 housing units, of which 7.9% were vacant. The homeowner vacancy rate was 2.1% and the rental vacancy rate was 10.7%. The average housing unit density was 333.5 per square mile (128.8/km^{2}). Of all households, 26.5% had children under the age of 18 living with them, 45.1% were married-couple households, 7.4% were cohabitating couples, 26.9% had a female householder with no spouse or partner present, and 20.6% had a male householder with no spouse or partner present. About 42.0% of households were non-families, 36.8% were made up of individuals, and 18.4% had someone living alone who was 65 years of age or older.

0.0% of residents lived in urban areas, while 100.0% lived in rural areas.

Racial composition as of the 2020 census
| Race | Number | Percent |
|---|---|---|
| White | 3,764 | 93.2% |
| Black or African American | 43 | 1.1% |
| American Indian and Alaska Native | 6 | 0.1% |
| Asian | 22 | 0.5% |
| Native Hawaiian and Other Pacific Islander | 0 | 0.0% |
| Some other race | 64 | 1.6% |
| Two or more races | 141 | 3.5% |
| Hispanic or Latino (of any race) | 115 | 2.8% |

=== 2010 census ===
As of the census of 2010, there were 3,796 people, 1,693 households, and 991 families living in the city. The population density was 603.5 inhabitants per square mile (233.0/km^{2}). There were 1,839 housing units at an average density of 292.4 per square mile (112.9/km^{2}). The racial makeup of the city was 98.6% White, 0.3% African American, 0.3% Asian, 0.3% from other races, and 0.5% from two or more races. Hispanic or Latino of any race were 1.3% of the population.

There were 1,693 households, of which 25.8% had children under the age of 18 living with them, 46.5% were married couples living together, 8.6% had a female householder with no husband present, 3.4% had a male householder with no wife present, and 41.5% were non-families. 35.6% of all households were made up of individuals, and 18.1% had someone living alone who was 65 years of age or older. The average household size was 2.18 and the average family size was 2.82.

The median age in the city was 43.3 years. 22.3% of residents were under the age of 18; 6.9% were between the ages of 18 and 24; 22.8% were from 25 to 44; 26.3% were from 45 to 64; and 21.8% were 65 years of age or older. The gender makeup of the city was 47.5% male and 52.5% female.

== Education ==
The Monticello Community School District operates local public schools.

== Notable people ==
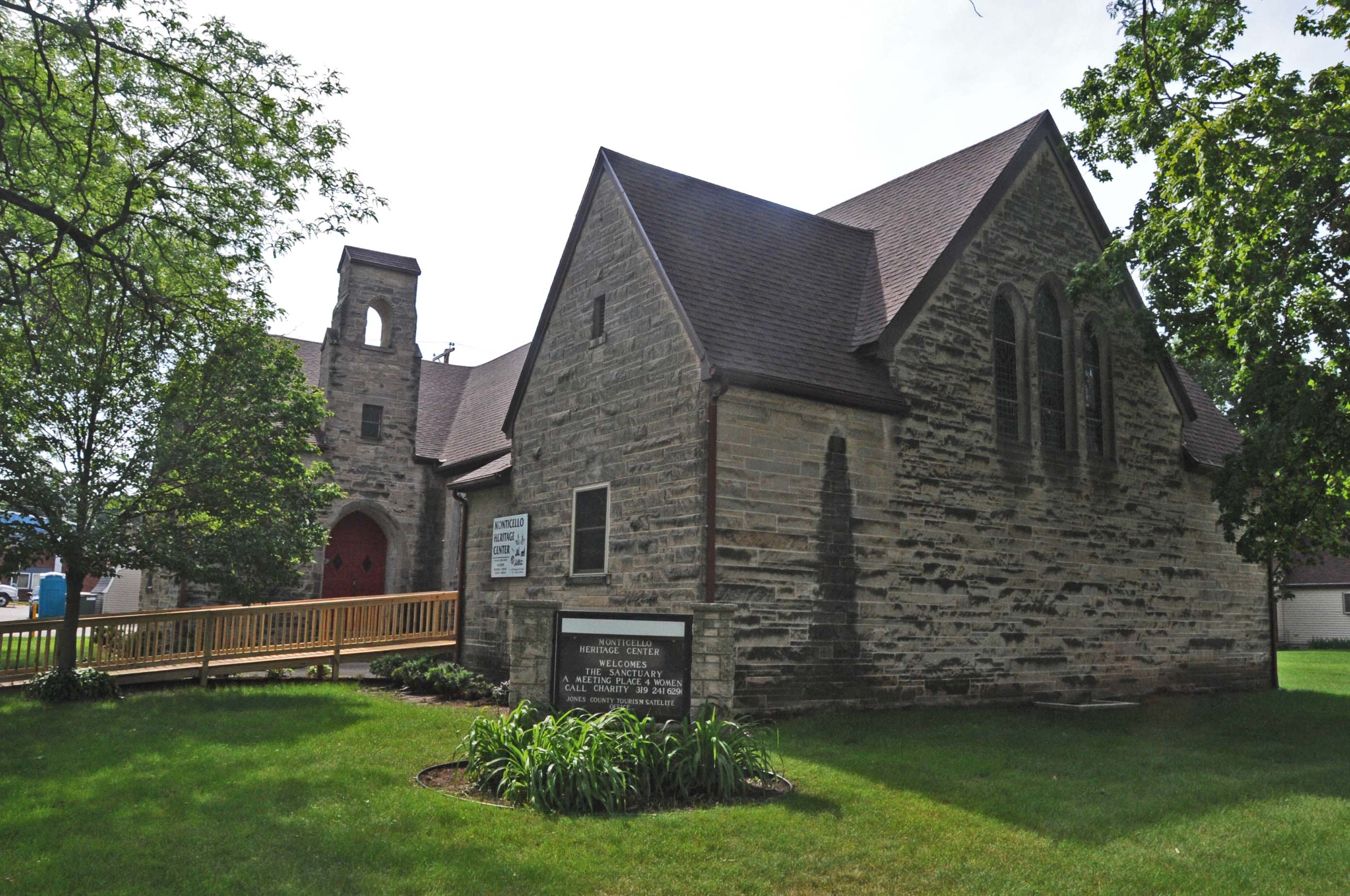
St. Luke's Methodist Church (2013)

- Samuel Charles Black (1869–1921), Fifth president of Washington & Jefferson College
- Colleen Conway-Welch (1944–2018), Dean of Nursing at Vanderbilt University School
- Roy Crabb (1890–1940), Major League Baseball pitcher
- Mike Dirks, All-American and All-Western Athletic Conference Football Player at University of Wyoming and Philadelphia Eagles
- Ellen Dolan, television actress, most notably in Guiding Light and As the World Turns
- Sewall S. Farwell (1834–1909), Civil War Veteran, Congressman
- Sheri Greenawald (b. 1947), soprano
- Charles W. Gurney (1840–1913), Lieutenant Colonel during the American Civil War and founder of Gurney's Seed and Nursery Company
- Alva L. Hager (1850–1923), Congressman
- Donald Knapp, Iowa State Representative
- Roger McMurrin, Conductor of Kyiv Symphony
- Kraig Paulsen, Iowa State Representative
- Cornelia Marvin Pierce (1873–1957), Librarian
- Bob Reade, 1998 inductee into the College Football Hall of Fame
- Walter Rice (1866–1930), a Denver architect born and raised in Monticello
- Grace Sandhouse (1896–1940), Entomologist
- Charles Henry Sloan (1863–1946), former Nebraska politician
- J. Remington Wilde (born 1951), professional songwriter
- Ray Zirkelbach, Iowa State Representative
