= Quinn Coliseum =

Sports venue in La Grande, Oregon, USA

Coordinates: 45°19′05.7″N 118°05′32.0″W

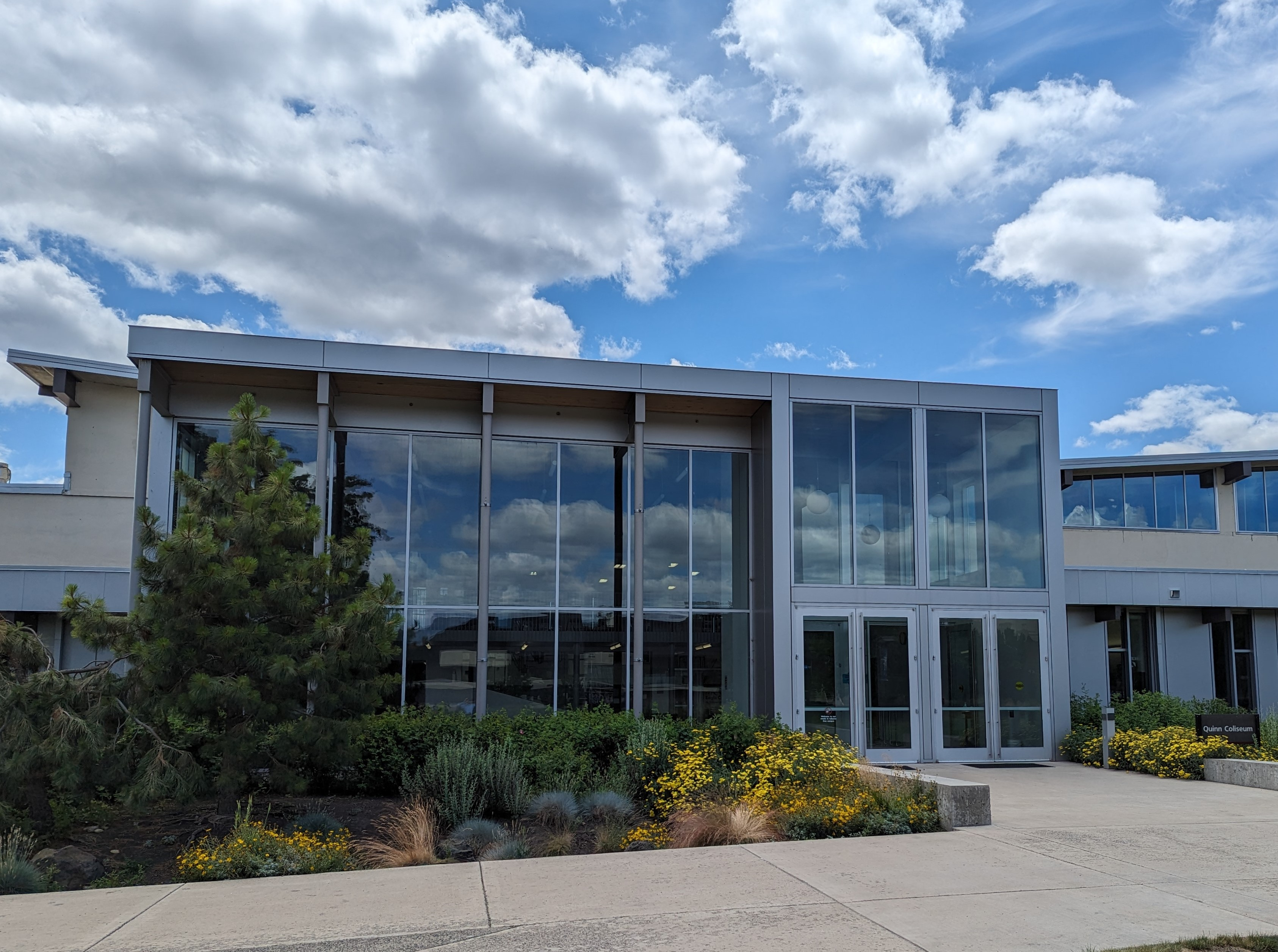
- Interactive map of Quinn Coliseum
- Location: La Grande, Oregon
- Owner: Eastern Oregon University
- Operator: Eastern Oregon University
- Capacity: 1,403

Construction
- Opened: 1958

Quinn Coliseum is the basketball, wrestling, and volleyball arena for Eastern Oregon University in La Grande, Oregon. Located at the center of campus on G Avenue between 7th and 8th streets, it serves as the home for Eastern Oregon Mountaineers indoor teams. It was constructed in 1958 with a "wing" architecture theme, and seats 1,403. Quinn Coliseum is named for coach Bob Quinn, who coached a variety of sports at the school between 1929 and 1967.

Quinn Coliseum hosted amateur boxing matches in the 1980s. In 1986, a drowning occurred in the deep end of the pool facilities. John Norton, 45 of Baker, was discovered at the bottom of the pool by a lifeguard and was unresponsive to revive him. In 2007, Quinn Coliseum was renovated, which included a new bleachers, energy efficient lighting, and new indoor softball batting cages. Quinn was rebuilt by SERA Architects from Portland in 2014 that added a 2-storey entrance as well as a practice gym and offices.

== See also ==
- Media related to Quinn Coliseum at Wikimedia Commons
