= Frank Avery Hutchins =

American educator, librarian and co-founder of the Wisconsin Library Association

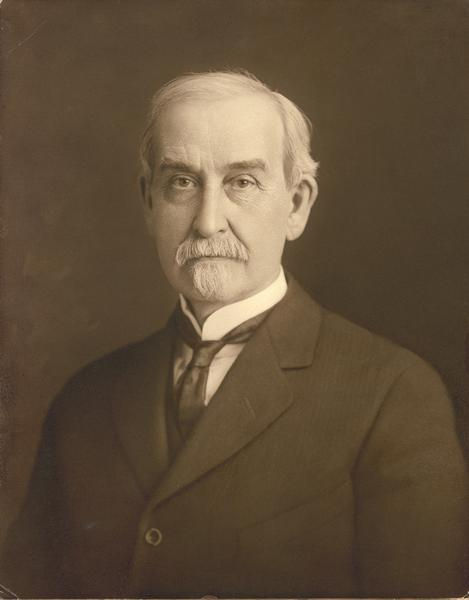
- Portrait of Hutchins
- Born: March 8, 1851; Norwalk, Ohio, US
- Died: January 25, 1914 (aged 62); Madison, Wisconsin, US
- Burial place: Baraboo, Wisconsin
- Known for: Co-founder and president of the Wisconsin Library Association; Chairman and executive secretary of the Wisconsin Free Library Commission

Frank Avery Hutchins (March 8, 1851 – January 25, 1914) was an American educator and librarian. He was one of the founders of the Wisconsin Library Association and the Wisconsin Free Library Commission.

== Early life ==
Hutchins was born on March 8, 1851, in Norwalk, Ohio, to Allen Sabin Hutchins, a school principal and classics teacher, and Henrietta Curry. When he was one, the family moved to Wisconsin, where his father took over the administration of Wayland University in Beaver Dam. The family moved between Beaver Dam, Beloit and Baraboo due to his father's illness and difficulties at the university.

He studied at Beloit College in 1871–73 before moving back to Beaver Dam due to an illness before he could graduate.

== Career ==
In 1874, Hutchins taught school in Fond du Lac, Wisconsin, where his uncle, Charles A. Hutchins, was city superintendent and in charge of the city's high schools. He also traveled for a book company which was followed by a period of illness.

In 1884, he became the editor of the Beaver Dam Argus (a Democratic weekly published by Benjamin Sherman), a position he held until 1891. He also worked as the city clerk during this time, and observing the community's need, he helped establish the Beaver Dam Free Library Association on August 30, 1884.

Hutchins was appointed as the library clerk by the Superintendent of Public Instruction of Wisconsin in 1891. He instituted the traveling libraries throughout Wisconsin which were instrumental in bringing library services to rural areas, and promoted and organized public school libraries.

He was one of the founders of the Wisconsin Library Association in 1891, became its first secretary, and was its President from 1894 to 1897. He met Lutie Stearns at the first meeting of the WLA. The two, along with Senator James Huff Stout of Wisconsin, were instrumental in founding the Wisconsin Free Library Commission, based on similar state library commissions in Massachusetts and New Hampshire. Hutchins drafted the bill that Senator Stout helped pass into law in 1895, which formed the Commission. Hutchins and Stearns were appointed as the Commission's first professional officers, though unpaid, by Governor Upham. When it was reorganized in 1897, Hutchins was appointed as salaried secretary and chief executive officer, a position he held until 1904 when he resigned due to poor health.

As secretary of the Commission, he drafted library laws, established the traveling library system, organized a summer school for training small town librarians and planned for the establishment of public libraries in small towns. He designed the concept of the Legislative Reference Library, a feature of the Wisconsin Idea, which was guided into legislation by Cornelia Marvin after Hutchins fell ill. It became the life work of the progressive politician, Charles McCarthy, who credited Hutchins as its originator, being called "the father of Wisconsin public libraries". The Wisconsin Legislative Reference Library became a model for the Congressional Research Service and was later renamed to the Wisconsin Legislative Reference Bureau in 1963.

In 1907, he was appointed as the secretary of the University Extension division and head of debating and public discussion at the University of Wisconsin–Madison.

Hutchins was an active member of the Wisconsin Anti-Tuberculosis Association. He helped the organization raise funds through the Christmas seal campaign in 1908. He was also active in the state park and conservation movement.

== Death and legacy ==
Hutchins died on January 25, 1914, of cerebral thrombosis caused by an accident. He was buried in Baraboo. A memorial service to honor him and his work was held on May 20, 1914, at the University Music Hall. Speakers included Lutie Stearns, Charles R. Van Hise, Francis E. McGovern and Jane Addams.

He has been credited as a promoter of the Wisconsin Idea due to his work in university extension. McCarthy called him a "great seer and warm-hearted idealist" for establishing Wisconsin's traveling libraries and the public libraries they grew into, as well as the library school. His annotated Books for Small Libraries and Buying List of Recent Books were taken over by the American Library Association, to become the Booklist.

He was inducted into the Wisconsin Library Hall of Fame on November 6, 2008.
