= Fallen Worker Memorial =

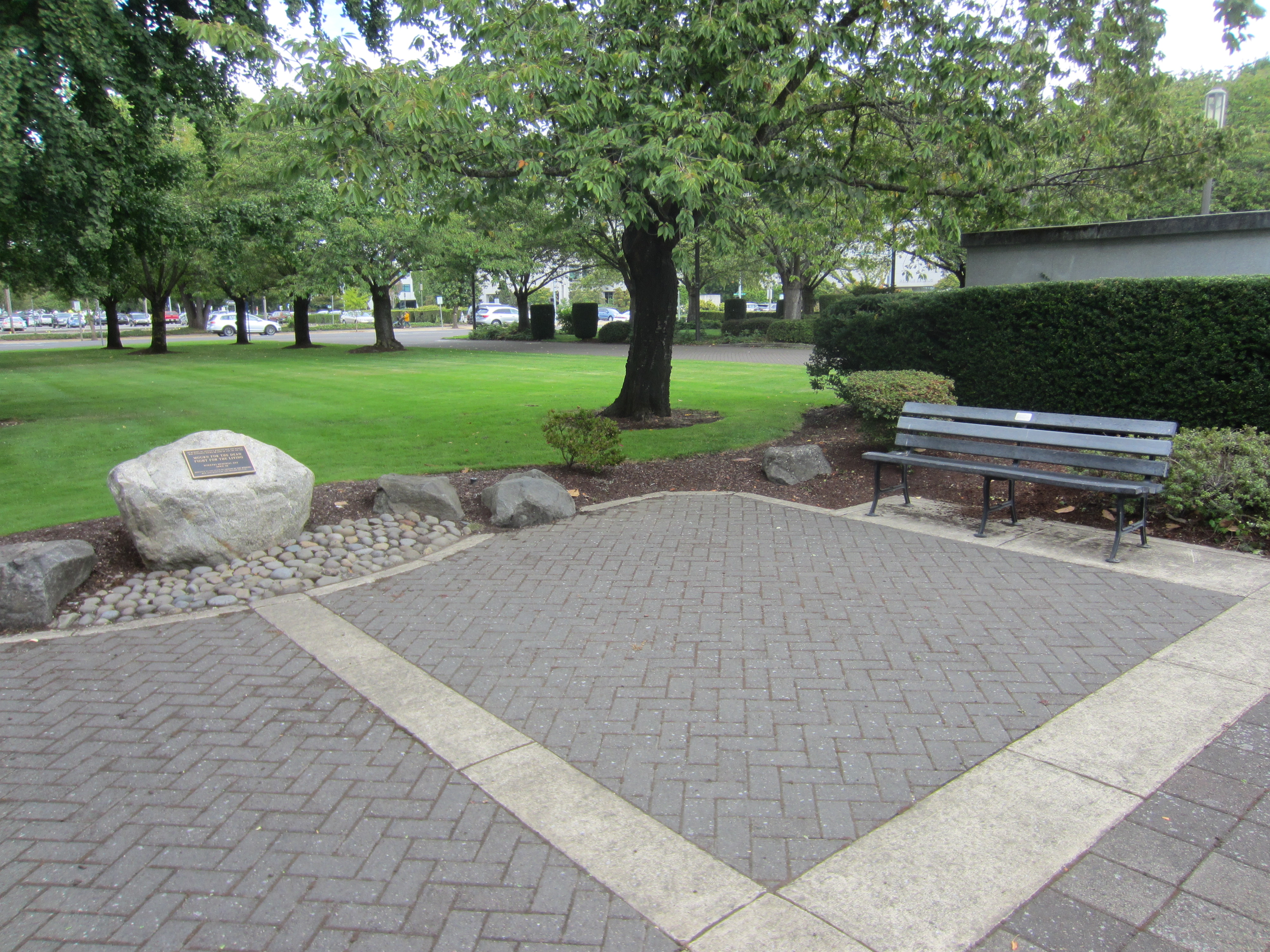
- The memorial in 2018
- Interactive map of Fallen Worker Memorial
- Location: outside Labor and Industries building, Salem, Oregon, United States
- Coordinates: 44.940774°N 123.030072°W
- Type: Memorial
- Material: Bronze
- Dedicated date: April 2009
- Dedicated to: Workers killed on the job

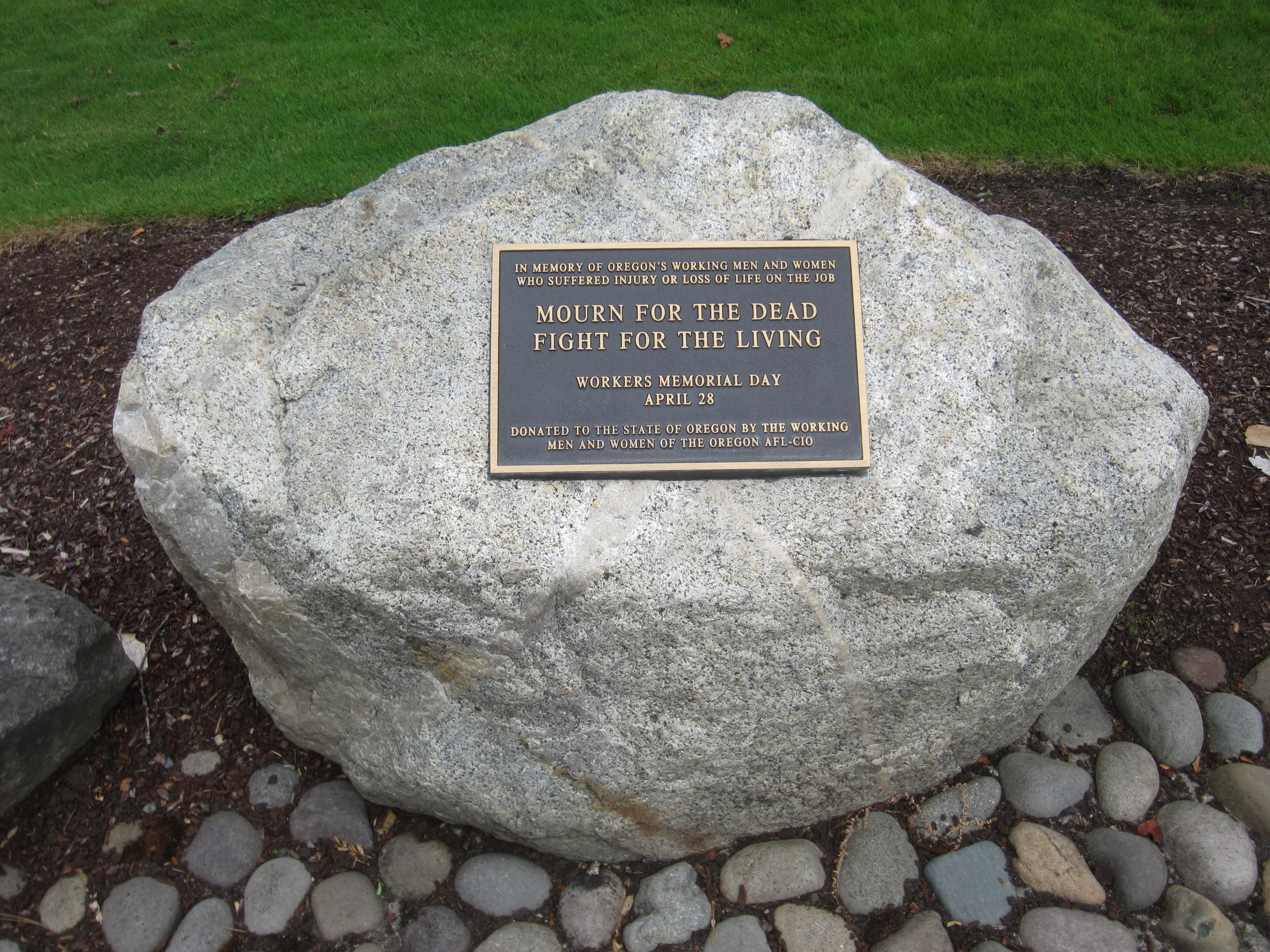
Commemorative plaque, 2018

The Fallen Worker Memorial is a memorial commemorating workers killed on the job, installed outside the state Labor and Industries building near the Oregon State Capitol in Salem, Oregon, United States. The memorial, which was proposed by Oregon AFL–CIO, approved by the Oregon Parks and Recreation Department, and dedicated in April 2009, features a bronze plaque and benches, cheery trees, and additional landscaping adjacent to the Labor and Industries Building. Construction cost approximately $20,000 and was funded by donations. The site has hosted services in observance of Workers' Memorial Day.

== See also ==
- Workers' Memorial Sculpture (1995), Indianapolis
