= Cornelia Marvin Pierce =

American librarian

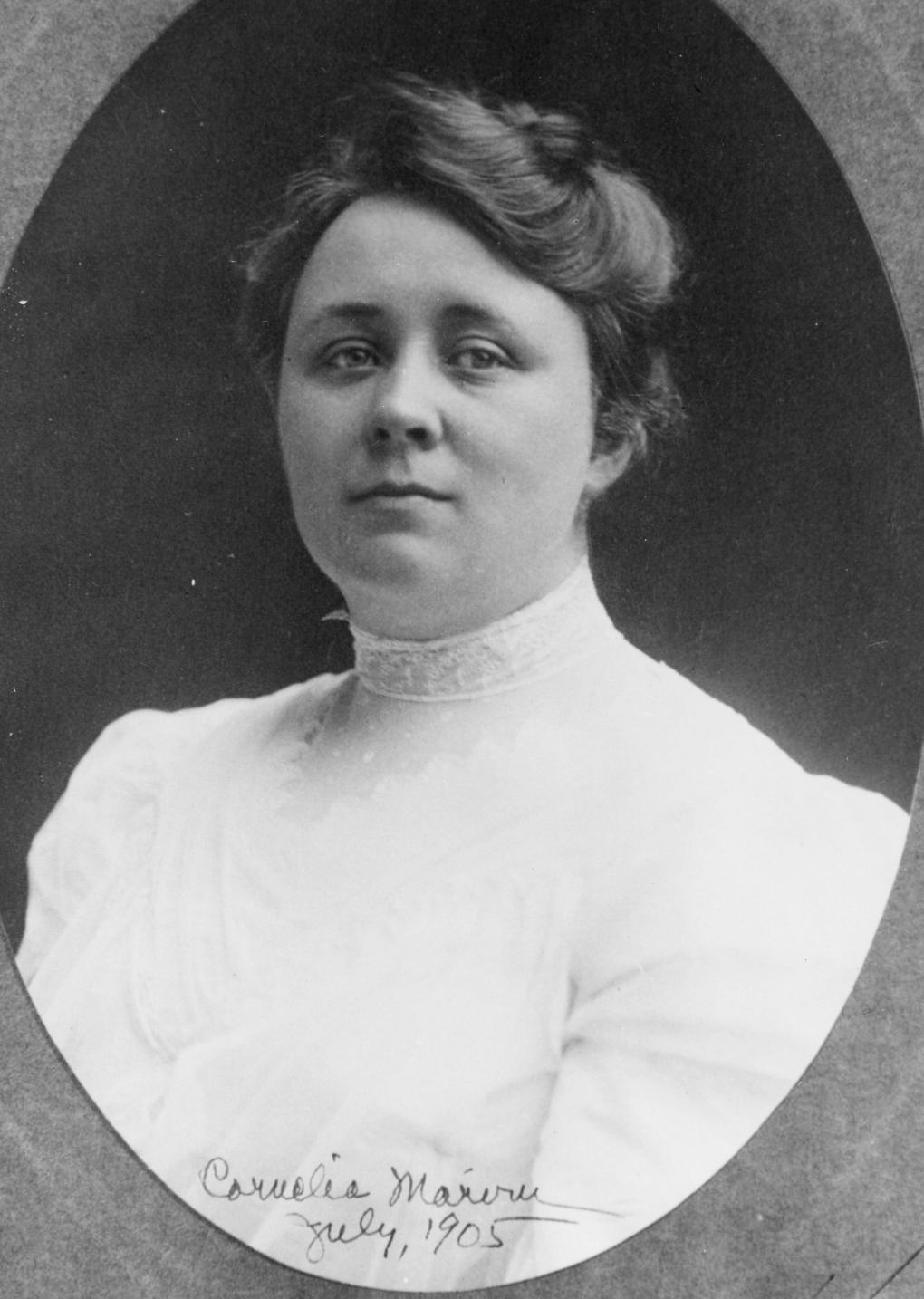
- Born: December 26, 1873; Monticello, Iowa
- Died: February 12, 1957 (aged 83); Salem, Oregon
- Occupation: Librarian
- Known for: First Oregon State Librarian

Cornelia Marvin Pierce (December 26, 1873 – February 12, 1957) was an American librarian, originally from Iowa. She moved to Oregon in 1905 to become the first director of the Oregon Library Commission and, later, the first Oregon State Librarian. She married former governor Walter M. Pierce in 1928, resigning her position to do so.

== Early life ==
Cornelia Marvin was born on December 26, 1873, in Monticello, Iowa, to Charles Elwell Marvin and Cornelia Marvin (née Moody) as the second of five children. After attending high school in St. Paul, Minnesota, Pierce's family moved to Tacoma, Washington, in 1891 where she finished her secondary education. Shortly after her mother's death, Pierce decided to set out on her own and moved to Chicago in 1893 to work as a "mother's helper" for a Mrs. Porter.

When Pierce first arrived in Chicago, she began taking extension courses in areas such as French history and ancient drama from the University of Chicago. By 1894, she had convinced her father to provide the $500 necessary for her to attend the Library School at the Armour Institute of Technology, which later became the University of Illinois in Urbana.

== Library career ==
Following her first year in library school, Pierce began working as both an assistant at the Armour Institute and as an instructor for reference and bibliography. Two years later (1897), she accepted a position as Librarian at the Scoville Institute of Oak Park, Illinois. It was during this time that Pierce also filled the position as the Director of the Wisconsin Library Commission Summer School of Library Training. She also worked as an assistant to Frank Avery Hutchins, the secretary and one of the founders of the Wisconsin Free Library Commission. In 1899 Pierce accepted her last position in the Midwest region, working as a full-time instructor at the Wisconsin Library Commission.

In 1905, Pierce moved to Salem, Oregon, to serve as the secretary of the newly-formed Oregon Library Commission. Later in life, Pierce reflected:

I do recall most vividly indeed those beginnings in August, 1905, when I arrived in Salem as Secretary of the Oregon Library Commission, which had neither books, quarters, traditions, nor financial support beyond the state appropriation of $1,200 a year for all expenses. The field was clear before me. It was the great privilege of my life to have placed in my hand the beginning and shaping of the new library venture in Oregon. Formulating policies, securing financial support from the Legislature, planning legislation for extension of library service through public and county libraries, and finally winning the name of Oregon State Library for the institution filled over 25 busy years of my life.

Pierce remained active in the library profession over the next couple of decades, participating in the Pacific Northwest Library Association. In 1913, she was appointed as the Oregon State Librarian, a role that she filled until 1928 when she married former Oregon governor Walter M. Pierce. The couple had dated for several years, but had not immediately married as it would have required Pierce to resign from her position as State Librarian.

== Political career ==
In 1932, Pierce considered a run for U.S. Congress, representing the second district of Oregon as the Republican candidate. Meanwhile, Pierce's husband was also contemplating his own run on the Democratic ticket. Ultimately Pierce decided to support her husband for Congress and served as both his adviser and speechwriter during the campaign. Cornelia Marvin Pierce remained an important force behind the scenes, working as Walter M. Pierce's private secretary during his 10 years of Congressional service while also serving on the Oregon State Board of Higher Education from 1931 to 1935. After Walter M. Pierce's election loss in 1942, the couple retired to a farm in Salem, Oregon.

Cornelia Marvin Pierce died on February 12, 1957, in a hospital in Salem after a "long illness." Pierce was remembered for her work in extending the state library system in Oregon, as well as for her role on the Wisconsin Library Commission earlier in her career.

== Eugenics and racial views ==
In 2020, the Oregon State Library added contextual interpretive signage to a plaque in its building honoring Pierce. The signage was added in response to increased awareness and sensitivity to Pierce's support for eugenics and her husband's association with the Ku Klux Klan. She supported social Darwinism and wrote in 1955 that the highights of her career were her husband's passage of Oregon's sterilization law, and her support for eugenicist doctor Bethenia Owens-Adair.
