= Walter Rice (architect) =

Walter Rice, also known as Walter L. Rice (1866–1930), was an American architect, inventor, and engineer. He made a career as an architect in Denver, Colorado, particularly for the design of apartment buildings. Several of his buildings are designated National Register of Historic Places. He patented inventions for automobiles.

== Early and personal life ==
Rice was born in Monticello, Iowa in April 1866. He was one of seven children born to Manley and Jane Rice and was raised in Monticello. His wife, Florence, was born in November 1869 in Iowa. They were married about 1887 and had a daughter, Edith, in November 1889 in Colorado. After a three-year-illness, Rice died in 1930. He is buried at Fairmount Cemetery in Denver.

== Career ==
Rice began his career in Chicago, Illinois as Chief Engineer for Corn Products Company. He contributed to the process of extracting corn syrup by steam pressure. He moved to Denver in 1889 and between 1890 and 1901 he is listed as a carpenter, draftsman, and then architect. He worked as an architect in Denver, planning the mechanical, electrical and structural engineering for the buildings. He was the partner of Charles Quayle in the firm of Quayle & Rice beginning in 1905.

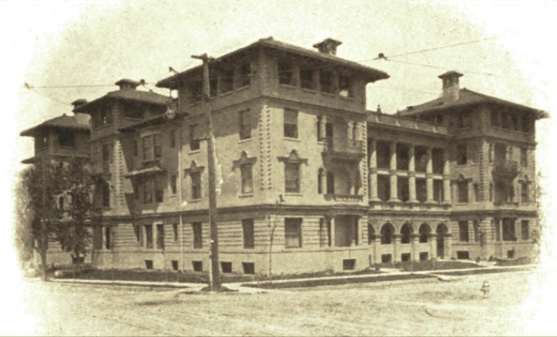
Cornwall Apartments, Denver, Colorado in 1903

In 1899, he designed an eclectic-style home at 1800 Gilpin Street. Walter Rice traveled to Mexico and Guatemala in the 19th century, where he developed an interest in Mexican colonial buildings. In 1901, he design and built Cornwall Apartments in the Capitol Hill section of Denver, which may have been the first Mexican Colonial building in Denver. It was listed on the National Register of Historic Places in 1976. It is considered one of the best of Walter Rice's buildings according to Thomas Jacob Noel and Barbara S. Norgren. Other architects later found that the style was better suited to the climate than the prevailing Victorian and European architectural styles.

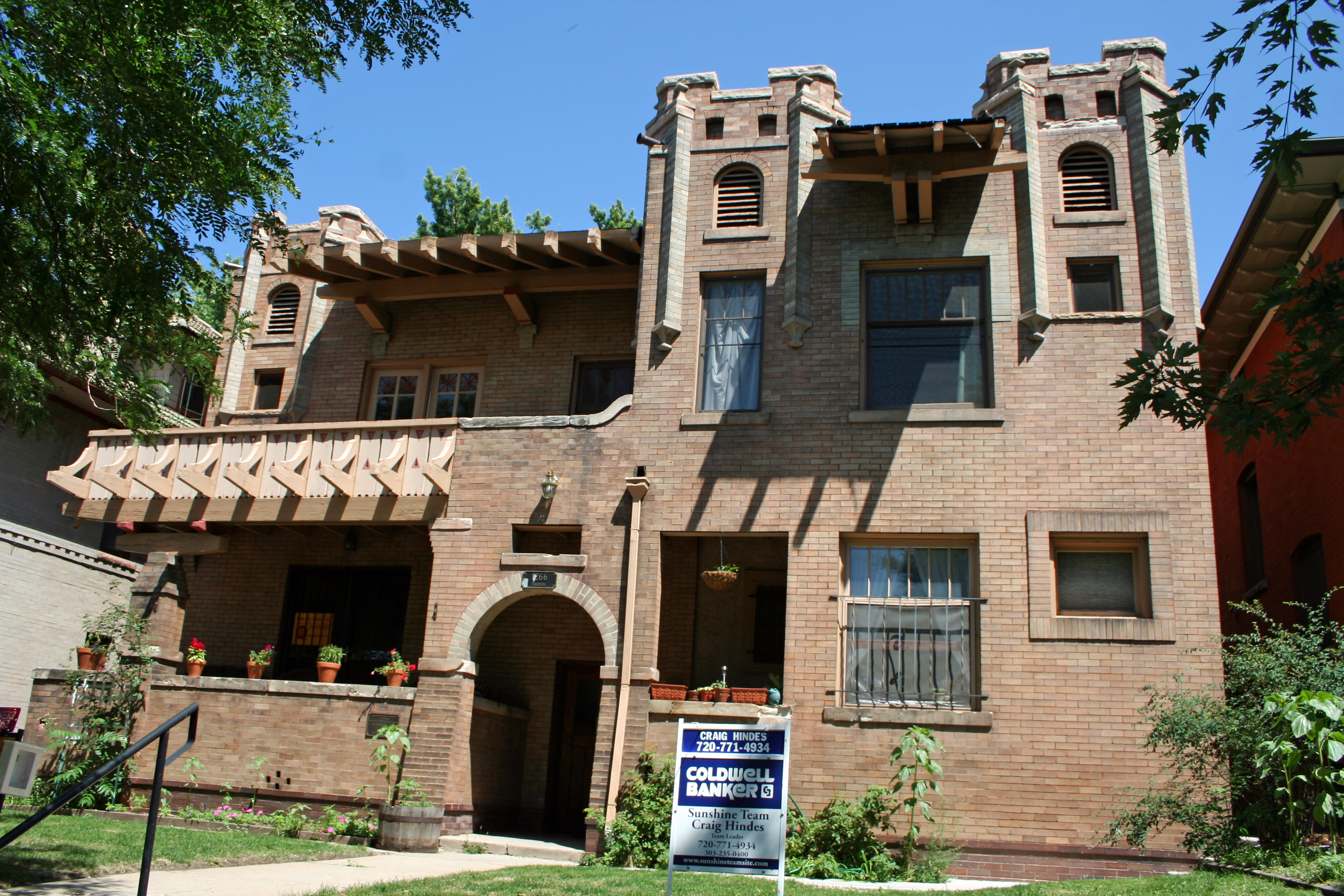
Eppich Apartments, Denver, Colorado

In 1909, he designed the Eppich Apartments, an example of American Craftsman style architecture. It was listed on the National Register of Historic Places in 1984.

By 1913, he had been a building inspector for the city and county of Denver. He was interested in forming laws for building construction. In 1925, he designed two apartment buildings on East Tenth Street, Granada Apartments and Cardenas Apartments. Both are three-story buildings based upon Spanish Colonial and Moorish architectural styles. There are arched bays made of white plaster that contrast with red brick walls, curvilinear parapets, and iron balconies. He worked as a member of the Allied Architects Association from 1923 to 1928. The association was formed to design the City and County Building of Denver. Rice was the architect of the Old Ladies Home at 38th Avenue and Quitman Street.

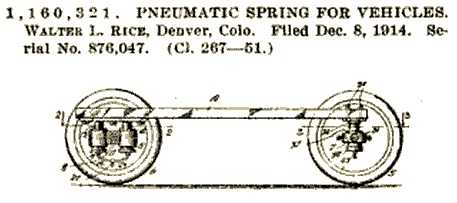
Walter Rice patent - Pneumatic spring for vehicles 1914

In 1914 he file a patent for a pneumatic spring for vehicles (patent 1,160,321). He also worked on improvements to carburetor of early automobiles to increase mileage. In 1920, he filed a patent for the Charge-forming device for internal-combustion engines (patent 1,406,416).
