= List of University of Portland buildings =

List of buildings on the University of Portland campus in Portland, Oregon, U.S.

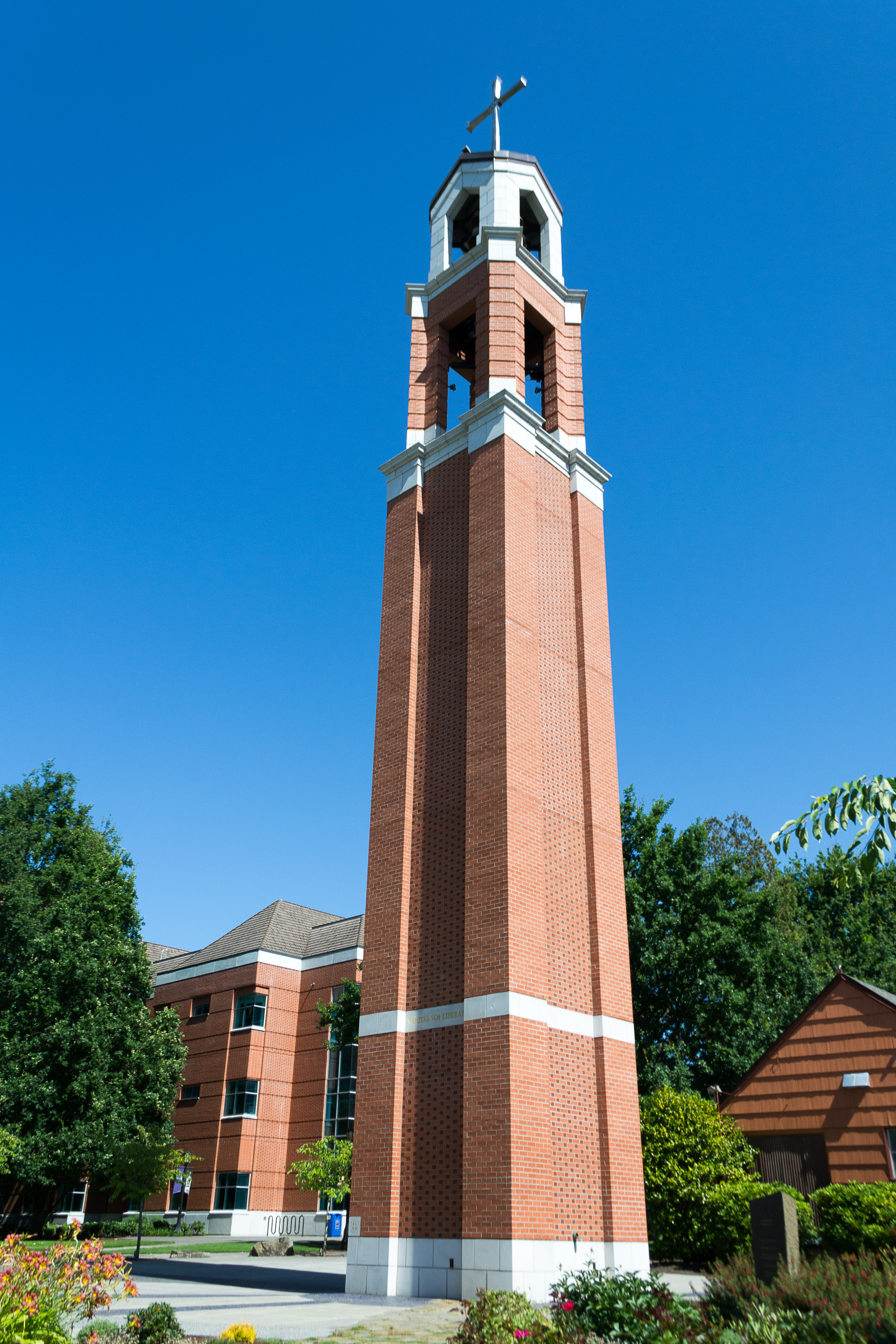
The Bell Tower in 2013

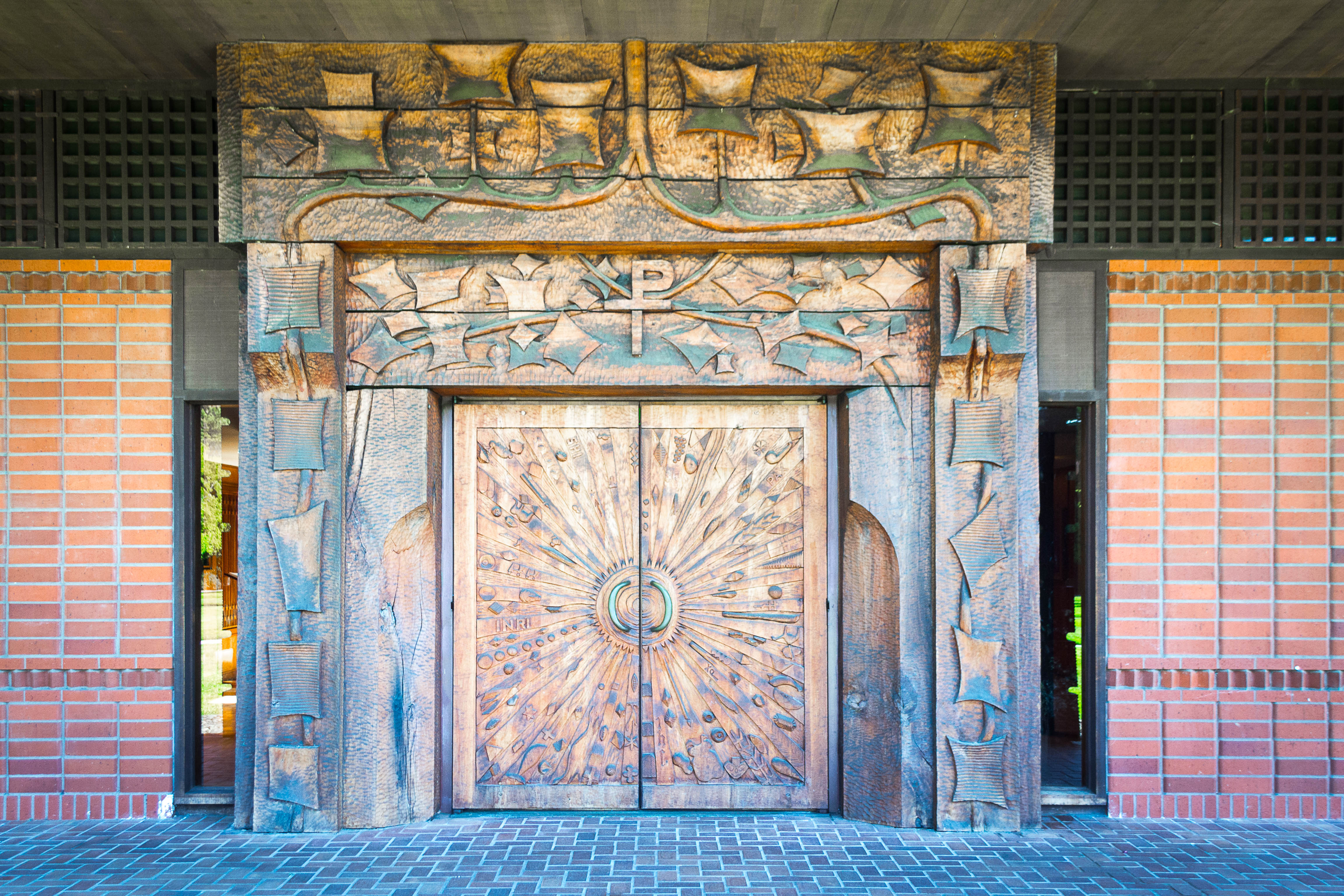
Entrance to the Chapel of Christ the Teacher, 2013

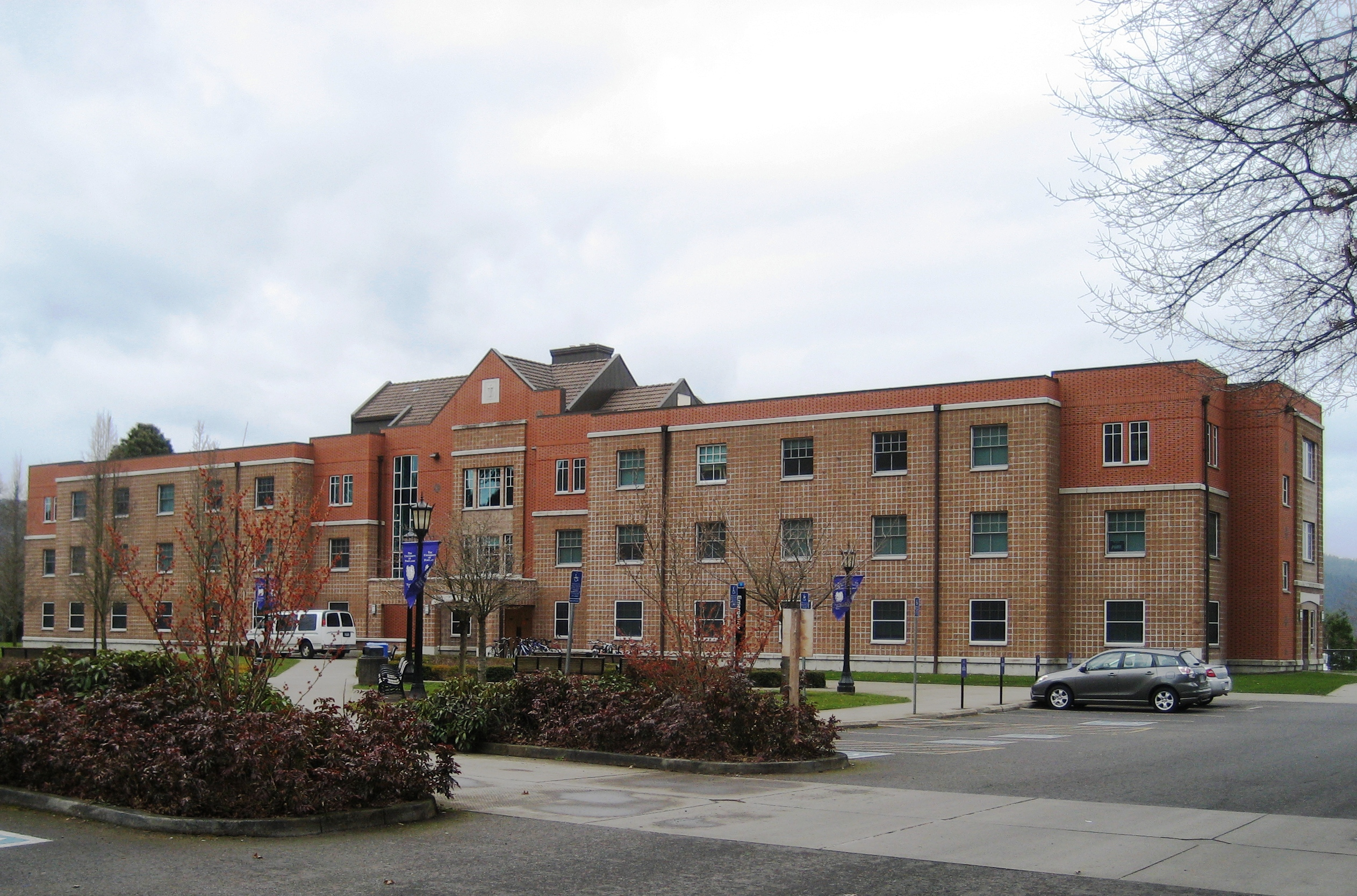
Corrado Hall, 2009

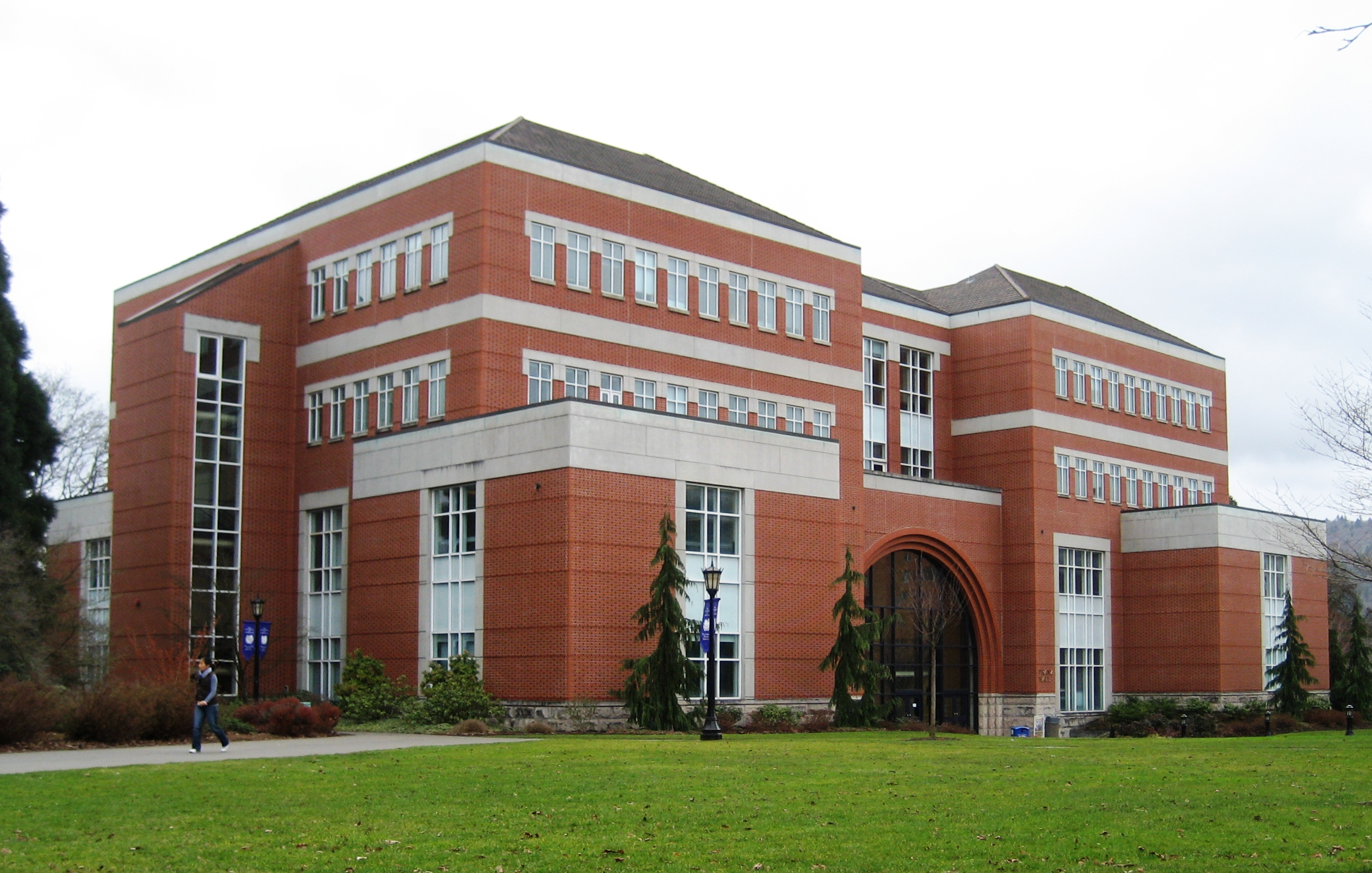
Franz Hall in 2009

Buildings and structures on the University of Portland campus include:

- Alumni House
- Bauccio Commons
- Beauchamp Recreation & Wellness Center
- Buckley Center
- Buckley Center Auditorium
- Chapel of Christ the Teacher
- Chiles Center
- Christie Hall
- Clark Library
- Clive Charles Soccer Complex
- Corrado Hall
- Fields Hall and Schoenfeldt Hall
- Franz Hall
- Haggerty Hall
- Howard Hall
- Joe Etzel Field
- KDUP
- Kenna Hall
- Louisiana-Pacific Tennis Center
- Lund Family Hall
- Mago Hunt Center
- Mehling Hall
- Orrico Hall
- Physical Plant
- Pilot House
- Public Safety
- Romanaggi Hall
- Shiley Hall
- Shipstad Hall
- St. Mary's Student Center
- Swindells Hall
- Tyson Hall
- Villa Maria Hall
- Waldschmidt Hall

== See also ==
- List of Marylhurst University buildings
- List of Portland State University buildings
- List of Reed College buildings
- List of University of Oregon buildings
- List of Willamette University buildings
