= Thomas Oddo =

University of Portland president (1944–1989)

The Reverend Thomas Charles Oddo CSC

17th President of the University of Portland
- In office 1982–1989
- Preceded by: Art Schulte (interim)
- Succeeded by: Art Schulte (interim)

1st National Secretary of DignityUSA
- In office 1973–1977
- Succeeded by: Placeholder Name

Personal details
- Born: Thomas Charles Oddo Flushing, Queens, Long Island, New York, U.S.
- Died: Portland, Oregon, U.S.
- Education: University of Notre Dame (BA, MA); Harvard University (PhD)

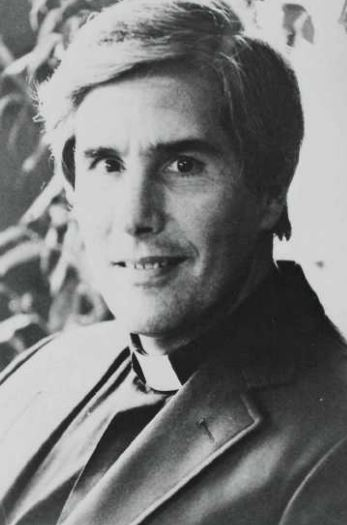
Father Tom Oddo, 1987

Thomas Charles Oddo, CSC (June 12, 1944 – October 29, 1989) was an American Catholic priest, educator, and president of the University of Portland. He was known for his leadership in Catholic higher education, his involvement with the early gay rights movement through DignityUSA, and his ministry within the Congregation of Holy Cross.

== Early life and education ==
Thomas Charles Oddo was born on June 12, 1944 in Flushing, Queens to Dominic Oddo, a physician, and Catherine Oddo, a nurse. His father Dominic served as a ward surgeon in World War II during Tom's infancy, stationed in England.

Oddo was raised Catholic, and attended private primary and secondary schools operated by the Congregation of Holy Cross. He attended Holy Cross High School from 1957 to 1961, where he belonged to several clubs and was active in intramural sports. He became an avid swimmer, competing for HCHS, and later Notre Dame, in the 500 meter dash and other events.

Oddo attended the University of Notre Dame from 1961 to 1965. He began his enrollment as a math major, but switched to philosophy after one semester. During his first year, he lived in a three-person apartment in Breen-Phillips Hall. While at Notre Dame, he was active in residential life, eventually elected Student Senator and President of the Hall Presidents Council. A graduate of the Class of 1965, Oddo was one of the first recipients of the University Medallion, presented by then-President Fr. Theodore Hesburgh CSC to 16 graduates that year.

Oddo attended a year of Novitiate training in Jordan, Minnesota from 1966-1967. He returned to University of Notre Dame for his seminary education, while also taking courses at the Catholic University of America and Holy Cross College in Washington D.C. In seminary, he was friends with Edward "Monk" Malloy, Hesburgh's successor as President of Notre Dame (1987–2005). Oddo and Malloy graduated in the same class with a Master of Professional Theology in 1969.

Oddo was ordained as a priest in April 1970 in South Bend, Indiana. He briefly ministered there before relocating to Boston in the early 1970s. Throughout that decade, he served at St. Clement Eucharistic Shrine on Boylston Street, where he co-founded a Boston chapter of the support group Dignity. Masses held by Dignity/Boston were notable for the involvement of laity in church customs, like distribution of the Eucharist, and often elevating women parishioners in their functions.

== Ministry and Teaching ==
=== DignityUSA ===
In 1973, the first national conference of DignityUSA, the newly-conglomerated union of Dignity chapters across the United States, was held in Los Angeles. At the event, Oddo was elected National Secretary on a slate of Boston-based candidates. In this role, Oddo supervised communications and outreach, including publication of the group's newsletter Dignity.

DignityUSA opted to support gay Catholic activist Brian McNaught in his 1974 water fast to protest the ending of his column in the Michigan Catholic, the first of multiple public actions and engagement campaigns by the group in the 1970s. Other actions involved coordinated leaflet, letter-writing, and public pressure campaigns on bishops and cardinals to ease church teachings on homosexuality.

At DignityUSA's second biennial national conference in 1975, Oddo was re-elected as DignityUSA's National Secretary.

In November 1976, owing to DignityUSA's efforts, the National Conference of Catholic Bishops issued To Live in Christ Jesus, a booklet which recommended new clerical approaches to social issues, including homosexuality. In the section titled "Children," the booklet states:

Some persons find themselves through no fault of their own to have a homosexual orientation. Homosexuals, like everyone else, should not suffer from prejudice against their basic human rights. They have a right to respect, friendship and justice. They should have an active role in the Christian community. Homosexual activity, however, as distinguished from homosexual orientation, is morally wrong. Like heterosexual persons, homosexuals are called to give witness to chastity, avoiding, with God's grace, behavior which is wrong for them, just as nonmarital sexual relations are wrong for heterosexuals. Nonetheless, because heterosexuals can usually look forward to marriage, and homosexuals, while their orientation continues, might not, the Christian community should provide them a special degree of pastoral understanding and care.

=== Harvard Divinity School ===
Oddo attended Harvard Divinity School for his doctoral studies from 1973-1979. His thesis, The Monk and the Activist: A Comparative Study of the Spirituality of Thomas Merton and Daniel Berrigan, compared the activist and monastic styles of Frs. Daniel Berrigan and Thomas Merton, both of whom inspired Oddo and his ministry. He graduated from Harvard in 1979 with a PhD in Christian Theology.

=== Stonehill College ===
Oddo became a member of the Stonehill College faculty in 1974, while serving on the DignityUSA board, and served as Acting Chairman of the Religious Studies department from 1981-1982. At Stonehill, he frequently taught courses on theology and human sexuality, delivered lectures on the subject to the general public, wrote about the works of Merton, and participated in at least one debate on gays in the church with another faculty member. In 1981, he was also featured on a local news program, All God's Children?, directed by Alex Frisbie for WNAC-TV.

== Presidency of the University of Portland (1982–1989) ==
=== Inauguration ===
After a short, three-year term in office, Br. Raphael Wilson CSC resigned the presidency of the University of Portland in 1981, owing to health concerns. Oddo was contacted by Fr. Richard Warner CSC, then-Provincial Superior of Indiana Province in the Congregation of Holy Cross, about the position in early 1982. Oddo reluctantly applied, but was later chosen by the hiring committee. At 37, he was the youngest finalist considered and the youngest man selected for the position. Oddo moved to Portland over the summer and lived in an on-campus apartment throughout his tenure. Oddo was inaugurated as the seventeenth President of the University of Portland on October 10, 1982. Milton Berle performed as a celebrity special guest during a pre-event dinner, drawing criticism for his humor and program.

=== Challenge I capital campaign (1982–1984) ===
Oddo led the university's first major capital campaign drive, Challenge I, beginning shortly after his inauguration in 1982. The campaign sought to raise funds for the construction of a new sports arena, increased faculty salaries, additional student scholarships, and other campus improvements. Despite initial community skepticism and stagnant early donations, the campaign was successful in completing the Earle A. & Virginia H. Chiles Center, opened in Fall 1984.

=== Campus Buildings and Improvements ===
Oddo oversaw a number of capital additions and improvements to the UP campus through 1989, including the construction and opening of Chiles Center, the Louisiana-Pacific Tennis and Racquet Center, and the Chapel of Christ the Teacher; renovations to several student life buildings; the installation of new campus sidewalks and the resetting of the university's track; and the approval of a new dormitory scheduled to open in Fall 1990. Most of these projects were built completely, or in large part, from donations.

=== Sports Culture ===
Oddo was a passionate fan of UP Pilots athletics and a frequent spectator. He composed the words to the university's victory march in 1984. Following a poor 1986-87 season, Oddo accepted UP Basketball coach Jack Avina's resignation, hiring former NBA player and member of the 1977 Championship Blazers team Larry Steele as his replacement. During Oddo's tenure, the UP Pilots women's basketball team made several appearances in the NAIA nationals, and were the 1984 runners-up to the UNC Asheville Bulldogs.

=== Coeducational Housing ===
UP students had spoken out for the creation of coeducational housing on-campus and the elimination of intervisitation hours between students of different sexes beginning in the 1960s. Upon his hiring as president, Oddo expressed support for the concept, citing its success at his former employer Stonehill College, but did not immediately act. After four years of consideration and campus-wide discussion, Oddo approved the designation of UP's first coeducational dorm, Shipstad Hall, in Spring 1987 and a second coeducational dorm, Kenna Hall, in 1988.

=== HIV/AIDS Education ===
In response to the growing HIV/AIDS epidemic, Oddo organized several initiatives to educate the public on the disease. Between 1986-1989, Oddo served as moderator of multiple forums on the virus, convened an ad-hoc committee on AIDS, and authorized the publication of an informational pamphlet by the University Health Center sent to the university's full mailing list in Fall 1987.

=== Student Life Issues ===
Oddo hosted President Ronald Reagan during his only re-election event in Oregon in October 1984. The rally, held in the newly-opened Chiles Center, was notable for dozens of vocal protestors in attendance and the presentation of a university jersey to the president, which later generated minor controversy.

Responding to criticism from students about UP's investment in companies connected to the Apartheid government in South Africa in 1985, Oddo disagreed that the university's divestment would be in the best interest of Black South Africans. The university's Board of Regents opted not to divest.

Working with state lawmakers, Oddo prevented the closure of UP's AFROTC detachment, unit #695, originally planned for 1988 by the Department of Defense.

== Death, Funeral, and Legacy ==
Oddo died in a car accident in Portland on October 29, 1989. At 3:42pm, a truck driving east on North Columbia Boulevard lost its trailer carrying a derelict car. The trailer drifted into oncoming traffic and hit Oddo's westbound car, killing him instantly. Oddo was returning to the University of Portland campus after his first meeting as a University of Notre Dame Trustee. No charges were filed against the driver of the eastbound truck, and the crash was determined to be a "freak accident."

Oddo's casket arrived at the UP campus later that night, and lay in state in the Chapel of Christ the Teacher. A memorial service was held in Chiles Center on November 1, with over 3,000 in attendance. Shortly after the service, Oddo's body was flown to South Bend for final services and burial. He was interred in Holy Cross Cemetery on November 3. He was survived by his mother and sister.

Several proposals were made for the creation of a permanent memorial on the UP campus for Oddo, including a dormitory (later cancelled), a fountain (proposed but never considered), and a soccer stadium (later named after Harry Merlo). Instead a sculptural memorial was created on the campus, known as the Oddo Memorial, alternatively Christ the Teacher and Four Students. The UP service award was rededicated in Oddo's name in 1991, and the first recipients of an accompanying scholarship received their awards in 1992.

A 1996 book claimed its coauthors had contacted Oddo in the afterlife via spiritual channeling. The book has been criticized for its contents, factual errors, and purported connection to the dead, and is now out of print.

Oddo's presidential term is covered at length in a chapter of James T. Connelly's A Century of Teaching, Faith, and Service: University of Portland, 1901-2001 titled "The 1980s: Oregon's Catholic University." Portland author Tyler Bieber wrote Oddo's first standalone biography, Against the Current: Father Tom Oddo and the New American Catholic, published in 2025 by Unencumbered Press.
