= East Side Deli =

Restaurant chain in Portland, Oregon, U.S.

Restaurant information
- Established: 2008
- Location: Portland, Multnomah, Oregon, United States
- Website: pdxdeli.com

East Side Deli (sometimes East Side Delicatessen) is a small chain of sandwich bars in Portland, Oregon, United States. The business was established in 2008. There were five locations, as of 2017.

== Description ==
The chain of sandwich bars East Side Deli (ESD) operates in Portland, Oregon. The location on Lombard Street in north Portland has a covered patio. The interior is brightly colored and has metal chairs and stools.

The 900-square-foot shop in Goose Hollow has a seating capacity of 25 people and sidewalk seating. The location on Madison Street at 11th Avenue in southeast Portland has an upstairs arcade and pinball.

According to The Oregonian, the business "caters to local businesses on weekdays, residents on weekends and people looking for late evening munchies seven nights a week".

=== Menu ===
The menu includes hot and cold sandwiches, soups, salads, chips, and desserts. Sandwich varieties include French dip, meatball with parmesan, Reuben, and spicy Italian. There are also gluten-free, vegetarian, and vegan options. ESD also serves hot dogs and beer, including growler service. Among hot dogs with Lightlife soy dogs are the Shihtzu, which has carrots, sweet chili sauce, and onion, or the Chihuahua, which has jalapeños, pepper jack cheese, pepperoncini, and habanero sauce. Sides include macaroni salad.

== History ==
The locally owned and operated restaurant was established on Hawthorne Boulevard in southeast Portland in 2008.

The second location opened on Lombard. There were three locations by 2015.

The Goose Hollow location opened as the chain's fourth in August 2017. The location has offered specials for students at nearby Lincoln High School.

Another southeast Portland location, which opened in 2017 as the chain's fifth shop, operates in the space that previously housed the bar Mad Sons. Cory Eddy is the owner.

== Reception ==
In 2014, Chris Onstad of the Portland Mercury said of the Italian cold-cut sub: "You can tell they serve a lot of vegetarians here. The East Side's Italian looked like someone inflated a loaf of bread with an entire New Seasons salad bar... right down to the black olives falling out everywhere. Bland, with the cold bouquet of a cucumber-scented potting shed." ESD ranked third in the Best Sandwich Shop category of Willamette Week's annual Best of Portland readers' poll ion 2016. It was a runner-up and ranked second in the same category in 2020 and 2022, respectively.

Nathan Williams of Eater Portland called ESD "a favorite among vegetarians and vegans in the Lombard neighborhood" in 2022. In 2023, Julianna Pedone of University of Portland's student publication The Beacon called ESD "a definite UP student favorite" and wrote, "Between its affordable prices, close proximity to campus and delicious sandwiches, it is hard to go wrong with anything here." The paper's Kimberly Cortez called the restaurant "a true standout in the North Portland area". She wrote, "Everything on their menu is a bite of freshness and offers a harmonious blend of flavors", and recommended the vegetable Italian, vegan barbecue, meatball parmesan, Reuben, and macaroni salad.

== See also ==
- List of restaurant chains in the United States
