= Bell Tower (University of Portland) =

Tower on the University of Portland campus

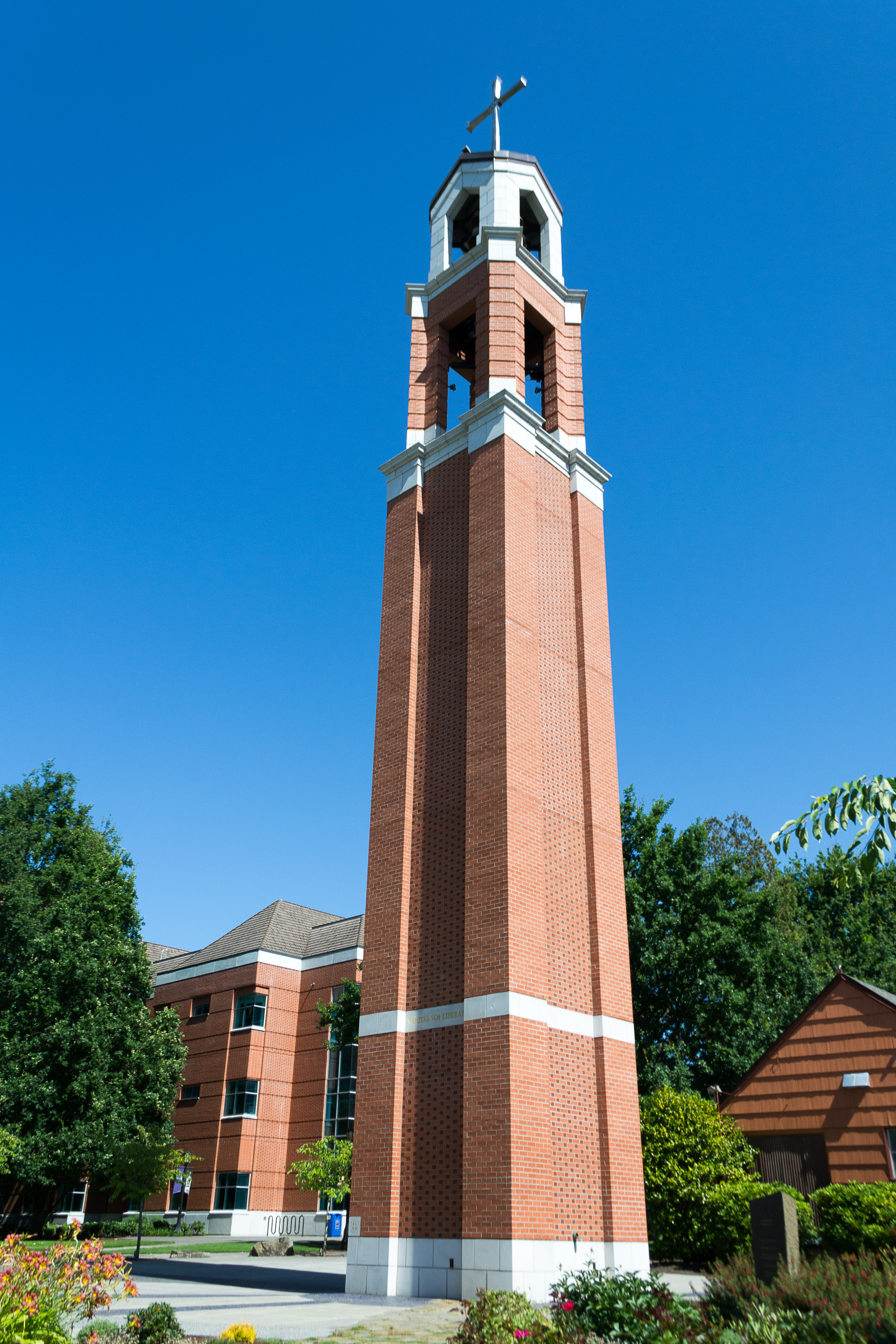
- The bell tower in 2013
- Interactive map of the Bell Tower area

General information
- Location: Portland, Oregon, United States
- Coordinates: 45°34′16″N 122°43′34″W
- Cost: $1.3 million

Height
- Height: 95 feet (29 meters)

Design and construction
- Architect: Dan Danielson
- Architecture firm: Soderstrom Architects
- Main contractor: Fortis Construction

The Bell Tower is situated on the University of Portland campus in Portland, Oregon, United States. Built during late 2008 and early 2009 at a cost of $1.3 million, the brick tower houses fourteen bells that ring the hours and chime music. It is topped with a glass-reinforced concrete cupola and cross made of brushed stainless steel. It is the university's tallest structure at 95 feet (29 m), and has been the site of vigils and on-campus demonstrations.

== Design ==
The bell tower was designed by Dan Danielson of Soderstrom Architects, and built by the Portland-based company Fortis Construction. It is situated within the Marian garden, part of the Chapel of Christ the Teacher. It is the campus' tallest structure, at 95 feet (29 meters). Design and construction of the tilt-up structure, made of brick with a glass-reinforced concrete cupola, cost $1.3 million. Deans, priests, and music department personnel contributed to the tower's design.

Danielson considered the existing architecture of the area in his design, saying that the tower "complements the forms and material of the adjacent Christ the Teacher Chapel by noted architect Pietro Belluschi, particularly in the shape of the cupola." He also noted that elements of the tower were designed to blend in with the rest of the campus: "the tower also echoes the appearance of other, recent buildings at the university with the use of a prominent cornice and belt course."

The tower has religious elements, including the Latin religious phrase Ave crux spes unica ("Hail the Cross, our only hope") that is carved above the base's entrance. The brushed stainless steel cross with a small glass globe in the center, at the tower's peak, casts a shadow that contains light within it, a reference to the Christian idea that there is a core of hope in the darkness of Jesus' death. The university's president, Father William Beauchamp, said that the tower serves as "constant visual and auditory reminder of the faith that has built and sustained this great institution". Reverend Tom Doyle, executive vice president, said that the tower "[augments] and [highlights] the spiritual nature of the education that takes place here" and "[draws] in, subtly, the historic components of the campus". The top of the tower is not accessible to the public.

== Bells ==
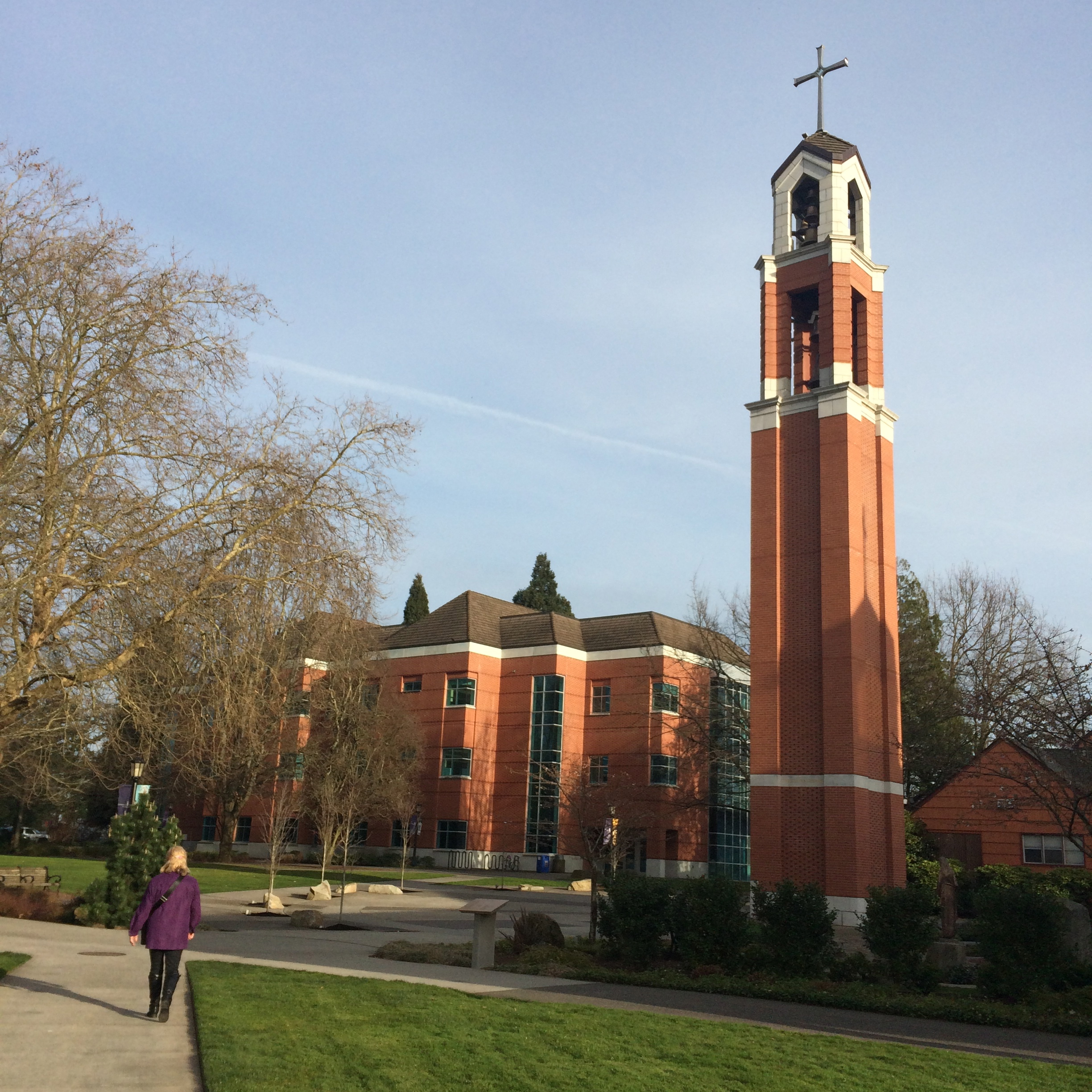
The tower in 2015

The tower houses fourteen bells of different sizes and ranging from 77 to 1,400 pounds (35 to 635 kg), which chime daily and seasonally. They were constructed in Amsterdam and provided by Chime Master Systems of Ohio. As of 2014, the bells ring the hours, from 9:00 am to 10:00 pm. They also ring the Angelus at noon and 6:00 pm, various hymns depending on the season at 3:00 pm, and the university's alma mater at 10:00 pm. The bells were sponsored by donors, funding an endowment program for campus ministry. Earle M. Chiles, son of former Fred Meyer president and philanthropist Earle A. Chiles, sponsored one of the bells.

To celebrate the tower's opening, the university produced and released the album Ring Out Your Joy, which features fifteen musical compositions recorded in the Chapel of Christ the Teacher and performed by more than 100 community members. The album was released in February 2009, and all songs feature bells, including those from the bell tower.

== History ==
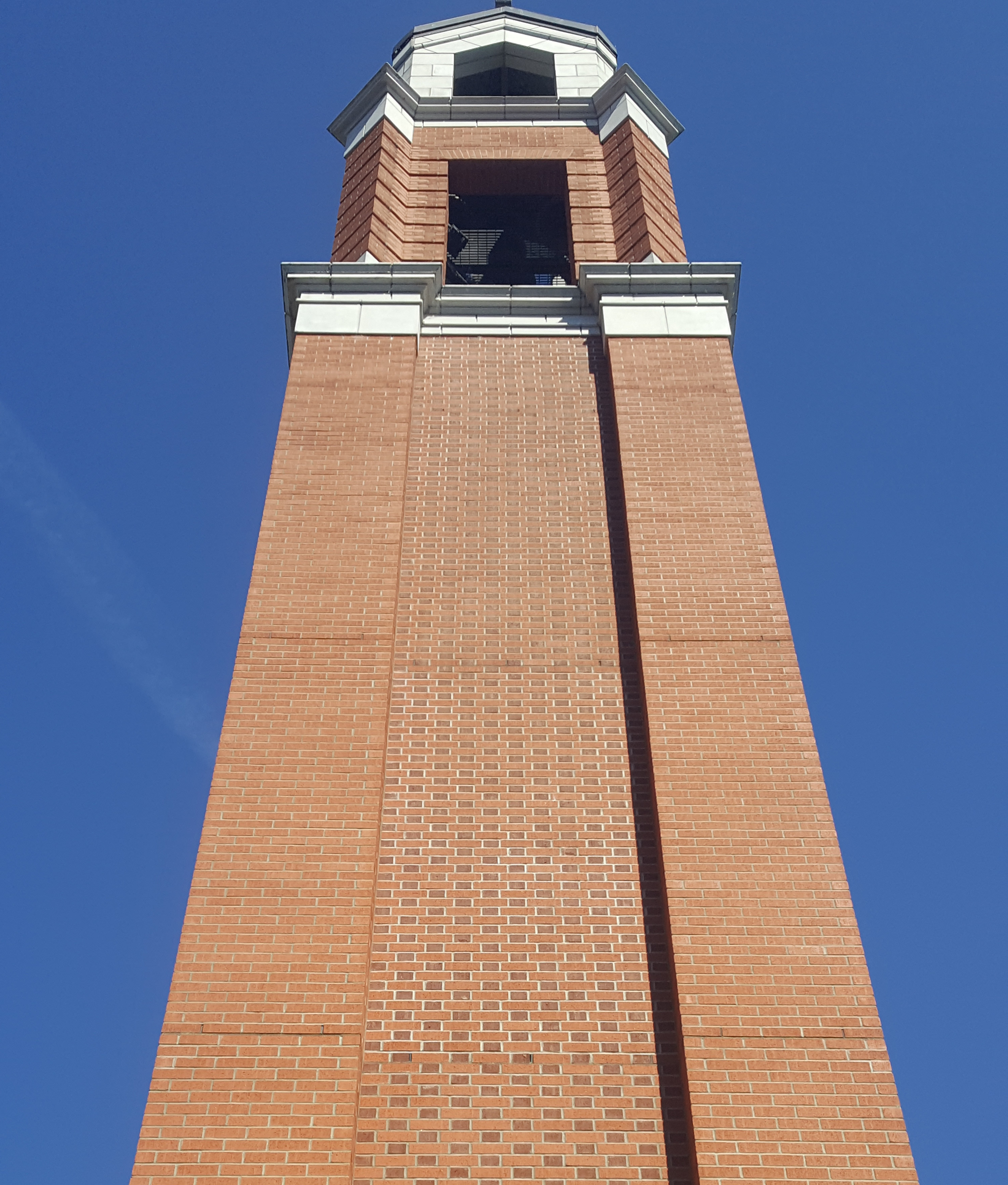
The tower in 2018

According to the Catholic Sentinel, school administrators had long wanted a bell tower to "highlight the university's religious character and serve as a landmark symbol". Plans for a tower began during the late 1990s. Allen and Kathleen Lund funded the tower's construction, which occurred over nearly nine months between late 2008 and 2009, along with several other building construction and renovation projects, the results of a major fundraising campaign. The university held a "Blessing of the Bells" dedication ceremony in April 2009.

In 2011, the university commemorated the tenth anniversary of the September 11 attacks by tolling the bells for one minute at the moment of each of three attacks. In April 2013, a candle-light service was held at the tower's base after the Boston Marathon bombing, and the group Green Dot (associated with the Green Dot Bystander Intervention educational program) hosted a gathering called "Bringing Light to Darkness: The Power of the Active Bystander" to commemorate bystander intervention. More than 200 students, faculty, and staff gathered at the tower in September 2017 to protest the repeal of Deferred Action for Childhood Arrivals (DACA) and to support those affected by the immigration policy change. Diversity leaders organized the vigil, and a banner displaying "#IStandWithDreamers" was placed in front of the tower.
