= Oddo Memorial =

Sculptural group in Portland, Oregon

- Christ the Teacher, Christ the Teacher and Four Students
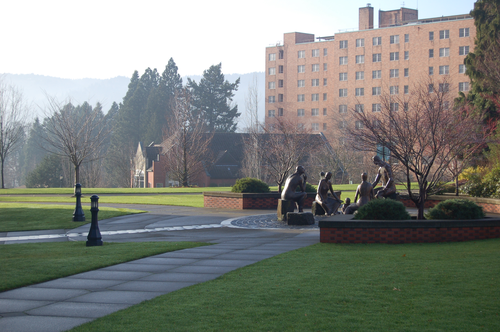
- The memorial in 2007
- Location: Portland, Oregon, United States; 45°34′22.7″N 122°43′40.9″W

The Oddo Memorial, also known as Christ the Teacher or Christ the Teacher and Four Students, is an outdoor sculptural group commemorating Reverend Thomas C. Oddo by Donovan Peterson, installed on the University of Portland campus in Portland, Oregon, United States. Oddo had advocated for the commissioning of a sculpture "that reflected both the University's Catholicity and its openness to all spiritual inquiry" in 1987. Oddo died in 1989, and in 1991, the university's president Reverend David T. Tyson recommended the sculpture serve as a memorial to Oddo. The memorial depicts Christ the Teacher and His companions.
