= Multnomah =

Multnomah may refer to:

- The Multnomah people, a Chinookan people who lived in the area of modern Portland, Oregon, United States
  - Multnomah, the middle Chinookan dialect of the Multnomah people
- Multnomah (1851 sidewheeler)
- Multnomah (sternwheeler), a steamboat that ran on the Columbia River and Puget Sound
- Multnomah, Portland, Oregon, a neighborhood of Portland, Oregon
- Multnomah College
- Multnomah County, Oregon
- Multnomah Falls
- Multnomah University
- Waterbrook & Multnomah, a division of Random House.
