= Timothy Gallagher =

American Catholic priest and author

The Reverend Timothy M. Gallagher OMV
- Gallagher in 2007

Orders
- Ordination: Priest, June 17, 1979

Personal details
- Born: July 16, 1954
- Profession: September 15, 1978
- Education: Doctorate in Spiritual Theology, 1983, Pontifical Gregorian University

Timothy M. Gallagher OMV is an American Catholic priest and author who has written several bestselling books on the theology and spirituality of Ignatius of Loyola, and other themes of the spiritual life.

Gallagher served for twelve years in formation of seminarians, for ten years as provincial superior of his Catholic religious congregation, the Oblates of the Virgin Mary. Since 2000, he has been dedicated to a ministry of writing, public speaking, retreats, digital events, and spiritual direction.

== Biography ==
Timothy M. Gallagher was ordained to the priesthood in 1979 as a member of the Congregation of the Oblates of the Virgin Mary. In 1983, he obtained his doctorate from The Pontifical Gregorian University, and became a spiritual director and retreat leader. He has taught at St. John's Seminary, Brighton, and Our Lady of Grace Seminary Residence, Boston, both in Massachusetts. In 2015, Father Gallagher accepted the St. Ignatius Chair for Spiritual Formation at St. John Vianney Theological Seminary in Denver. He has written over twenty books on spiritual themes, published articles in Catholic periodicals, appears frequently on Catholic television, and records many podcasts, radio interviews, series on YouTube, and virtual events used throughout the English-speaking Catholic world.

== Writing ==
Since 2005, he has written a series of books on core topics in Ignatian spirituality, including discernment of spirits, discernment of God's will, discernment in the married vocation and in priesthood, the Examen prayer, contemplation and meditation. The Examen Prayer, honored by the Catholic Press Association, was the first to appear on the national Catholic bestseller list. The Discernment of Spirits was later made into a 26-part CatholicTV series. Subsequently, TV series were also produced on The Examen Prayer, Meditation and Contemplation, and Discerning the Will of God.

In 2013, Fr. Gallagher published a biography of the Venerable Bruno Lanteri entitled: Begin Again: The Life and Spiritual Legacy of Bruno Lanteri. This is his third book on the Venerable Lanteri, joining two others written in the 1980s. He has published two further books on Venerable Bruno Lanteri, Overcoming Spiritual Discouragement: the Wisdom and Spiritual Power of Venerable Bruno Lanteri (2019), and A Biblical Way of Praying the Mass: the Eucharistic Wisdom of Venerable Bruno Lanteri (2020). In 2016, Fr. Gallagher published a small, popular title about Venerable Bruno Lanteri via the Discerning Hearts ministry, containing spiritual counsels from his life and writings.

He has also written two books on the Liturgy of the Hours, Praying the Liturgy of the Hours: A Personal Experience (2014), and A Layman's Guide to the Liturgy of the Hours: How the Prayers of the Church Can Change Your Life (2019).

He has written further books for assistance in the spiritual life: When You Struggle in the Spiritual Life: An Ignatian Path to Freedom (2021) and Struggles in the Spiritual Life: Their Nature and Their Remedies (2022).

Many of his books are published in other languages, including Spanish, Portuguese, Korean, Polish, and Latvian.

== Works ==
=== Ignatian titles on Discernment and Prayer ===
- Gallagher, Timothy (2005). The Discernment of Spirits: An Ignatian Guide to Everyday Life. New York: Crossroad. ISBN 978-0-8245-2291-9.
- —— (2006). The Examen Prayer: Ignatian Wisdom for Our Lives Today. New York: Crossroad. ISBN 978-0-8245-2367-1.
- —— (2007). Spiritual Consolation: An Ignatian Guide to Greater Discernment. New York: Crossroad. ISBN 978-0-8245-2429-6.
- —— (2008). Meditation and Contemplation: An Ignatian Guide to Prayer with Scripture. New York: Crossroad. ISBN 978-0-8245-2488-3.
- —— (2008). An Ignatian Introduction to Prayer: Spiritual Reflections According to the Spiritual Exercises. New York: Crossroad. ISBN 978-0-8245-2487-6.
- ——. "The Discernment of Spirits When Do the Second Week Rules Apply?". The Way. Jan/April 2008: 125–142.
- —— (2009). Discerning the Will of God: An Ignatian Guide to Christian Decision Making. New York: Crossroad. ISBN 978-0-8245-2489-0.
- —— (2013). A Reader's Guide to The Discernment of Spirits: An Ignatian Guide for Everyday Living. New York: Crossroad. ISBN 978-0-8245-4985-5.
- —— (2017). A Handbook for Spiritual Directors: An Ignatian Guide for Accompanying Discernment of God's Will. New York: Crossroad. ISBN 978-0-8245-2171-4.
- —— (2018). Settings Captives Free: Personal Reflections on Ignatian Discernment of Spirits. New York: Crossroad. ISBN 978-0824599072.
- —— (2019). Teaching Discernment: A Pedagogy for Presenting Ignatian Discernment of Spirits. New York: Crossroad. ISBN 978-0-82459-935-5.
- —— (2020). Discernment of Spirits in Marriage. Manchester: Sophia Institute Press. ISBN 9781644133477.
- —— (2021). The Discerning Priest: Ignatian Wisdom for Daily Life in Priesthood. Omaha, NE: IPF. ISBN 978-1-7342831-5-0.
- Gallagher, Timothy; Gallagher, David (April 2021). "Ignatian Discernment and Thomistic Prudence: Opposition or Harmony?". The Way. 60 (2): 18–36.

=== On Venerable Bruno Lanteri ===
- Gallagher, Timothy (1983). Gli esercizi di S. Ignazio nella spiritualità e carisma di fondatore di Pio Bruno Lanteri. Rome: Typis Pontificiae Universitatis Gregorianae.
- —— (1989). Un'esperienza dello Spirito. Pio Bruno Lanteri: Il suo carisma nelle sue parole. Cuneo: AGA.
- —— (2013). Begin Again: The Life and Spiritual Legacy of Bruno Lanteri. New York: Crossroad. ISBN 978-0-8245-2579-8.
- —— (2016). The Venerable Bruno Lanteri: Spiritual Counsels for Life in the World. Omaha, NE: Discerning Hearts. ISBN 978-0988627048.
- —— (2019). Overcoming Spiritual Discouragement: The Wisdom and Spiritual Power of Venerable Bruno Lanteri. Irondale, AL: EWTN. ISBN 978-1-68278-095-4.

=== On the Liturgy of the Hours ===
- Gallagher, Timothy (2014). Praying the liturgy of the hours: a personal journey. New York: Crossroad. ISBN 978-0-8245-2032-8.
- —— (2019). A Layman's Guide to the Liturgy of the Hours: How the Prayers of the Church can Change Your Life. Irondale, AL: EWTN. ISBN 978-1-68278-075-6.

=== On Themes of the Spiritual Life ===
- Gallagher, Timothy (2021). When You Struggle in the Spiritual Life Subtitle: An Ignatian Path to Freedom. New York: Crossroad. ISBN 9780824597023.
- —— (2022). Struggles in the Spiritual Life: Their Nature and Their Remedies. Manchester, NH: Sophia Institute. ISBN 9781644136300.

== TV Series ==
Fr. Gallagher produced these broadcast conferences with EWTN.

- Liturgy of the Hours for Lay People
- Venerable Bruno's Spiritual Direction for Lay People
- Discerning the Will of God: A Guide to Catholic Decision Making
- Finding God in All Things: The Teaching of St. Ignatius on Prayer
- Living the Discerning Life: The Spiritual Teaching of St. Ignatius

== Podcasts ==
Fr. Gallagher produced these podcasts with Discerning Hearts and OMV Productions.

- The Discernment of Spirits: Setting Captives Free (16 episodes)
- The Daily Examen (8 episodes)
- Meditation and Contemplation (7 episodes)
- The Discernment of God’s Will in Everyday Decisions (12 episodes)
- Praying the Liturgy of the Hours (8 episodes)
- Spiritual Desolation: Be Aware, Understand, Take Action (10 episodes)
- Begin Again: The Spiritual Legacy of Ven. Bruno Lanteri (18 episodes)
- A Lord of the Rings Spiritual Retreat (11 episodes)
- The Letters of St. Therese of Lisieux (13 episodes)
- Discerning the Will of God Seminar (8 episodes)
- Biblical Way of Praying the Mass (13 episodes)
- Spiritual Desolation (10 episodes)
- Contemplation to Attain the Love of God (2 episodes)
- Servant of God Leoni Martin (15 episodes)
- Overcoming Spiritual Discouragement (4 episodes)
- Un Coeur Pour Discerner (16 episodes)

In 2022, the Hallow app published Fr. Gallagher's "Spiritual Exercises" in 28 parts.
