= Robert D. Kelly =

President of the University of Portland

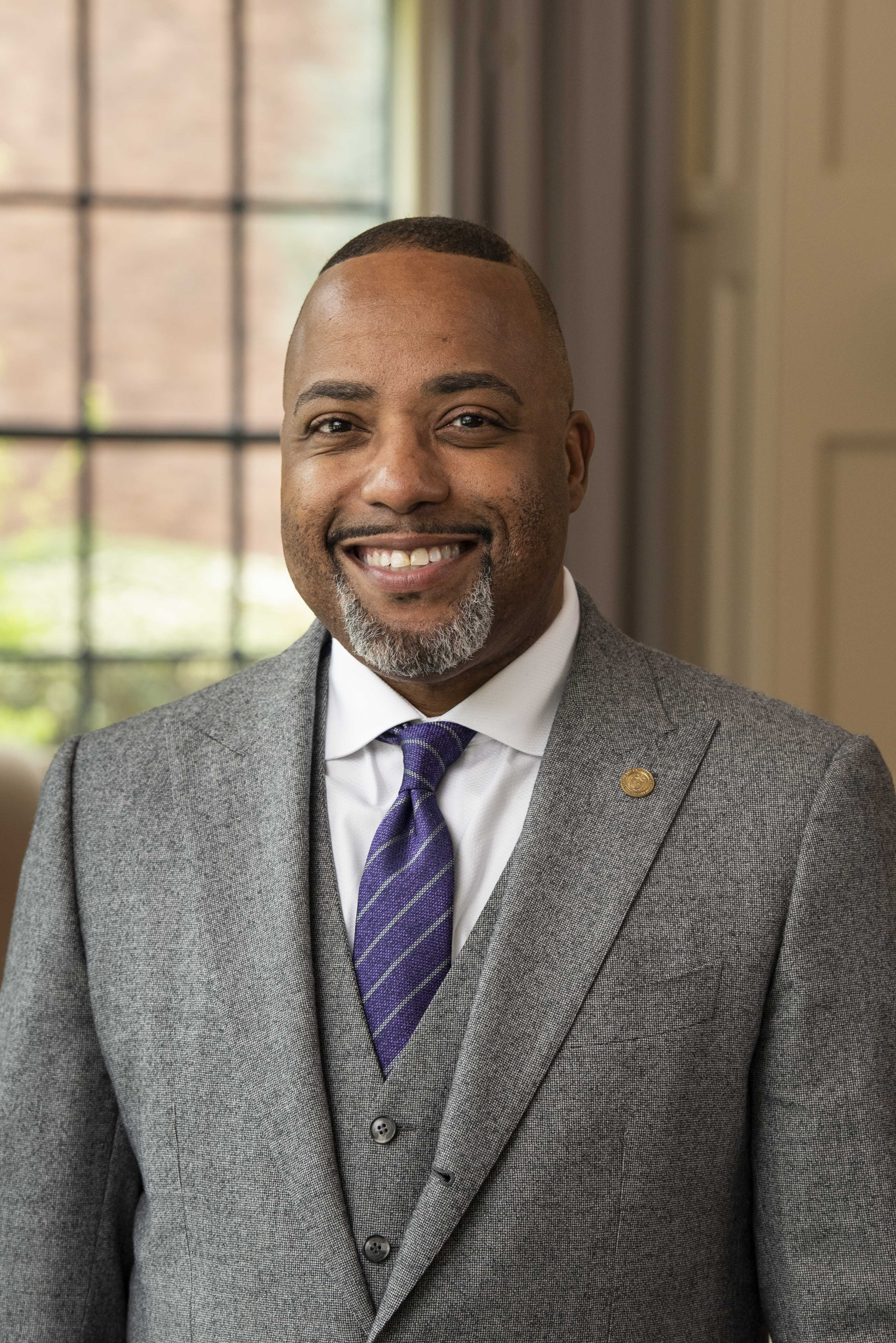
- Born: May 29, 1972 (age 54); Jersey City, New Jersey, U.S.
- Education: BA, Loyola University Maryland; MA, University of Vermont; PhD, University of Maryland, College Park
- Title: President of the University of Portland
- Predecessor: Rev. Mark L. Poorman, C.S.C.
- Spouse: Bridget Turner Kelly
- Website: https://www.up.edu/president/index.html

Robert D. Kelly (born May 29, 1972) is an American higher education administrator and professor serving as president of the University of Portland, a Catholic university in Portland, Oregon, affiliated with the Congregation of Holy Cross. He is the first layperson and first person of color to hold this position.

== Education ==
Kelly earned a Bachelor of Arts degree in political science from Loyola University Maryland in 1994. He later received a Master of Arts in higher education and student affairs administration from the University of Vermont and a Doctor of Philosophy in education policy, planning, and administration from the University of Maryland, College Park.

== Career ==
Kelly has worked at Union College, Loyola University Chicago and Seattle University. He served on the Loyola University Maryland Board of Trustees from 2003 to 2017 and help a position as University Vice President and Special Assistant to the President. He has authored publications on higher education leadership, including Disruptive Transformation: Leading Creative and Innovative Teams in Higher Education.

Kelly serves on several educational boards, including the NCAA Division I Committee on Academics, the Oregon Alliance of Independent Colleges and Universities, the University of St. Thomas, and the Catlin Gabel School.

=== University of Portland presidency ===
Kelly became president of the University of Portland in 2022, and is the first Black and non-ordained person to hold the position. In 2025, Kelly signed an open letter from universities "opposing government intrusion".

== Personal life ==
Kelly is Catholic. He is married to Bridget Turner Kelly; they have two children and reside in Portland.
