= Timothy Gallagher (disambiguation) =

Timothy Gallagher (born 1954) is a priest and author.

Timothy Gallagher or Tim Gallagher may also refer to:

- Timothy Gallagher (politician) (1840–1888), New Zealand politician
- Tim Gallagher, writer
- Tim Gallagher (singer)
