= Oblate Sisters of the Virgin Mary of Fatima =

Roman Catholic religious congregation for women

The Congregation of the Oblate Sisters of the Virgin Mary of Fatima (O.M.V.F.) is a Catholic religious institute of women of pontifical right founded in northern Italy on 13 May 1978. It gained pontifical status on 31 May 2001.

== History ==
The congregation was founded in 1978 in the Shrine of Our Lady of Fatima in San Vittorino (a peripheral zone of Rome, Italy, in the Diocese of Tivoli).

The name of the institute is derived from that of the Oblates of the Virgin Mary. The institute also inherits the devotion to Mary especially under the title of Our Lady of Fátima.

The institute, erected by the bishop of Tivoli, Guglielmo Giaquinta, on 13 May 1978, obtained pontifical recognition on 31 May 2001.

== Activity and spread ==
The sisters dedicate themselves to the organization of retreats and courses of the Spiritual Exercises of Ignatius of Loyola, to the promotion of Catholic books, to catechesis, to the promotion of vocations, to domestic service, and to the assistance of priests.

Beyond Italy, they are present in Portugal, the Principality of Monaco, Sri Lanka, and Brazil. The seat of general government remains in San Vittorino. As of 2008 the sisters number 92 in 17 houses.
