= Shiley Hall =

Building on the University of Portland campus in Portland, Oregon, U.S.

- Interactive map of the Shiley Hall area

General information
- Location: Portland, Oregon, United States
- Coordinates: 45°34′18.8″N 122°43′40.6″W

Shiley Hall is an academic building on the University of Portland campus in Portland, Oregon, United States.
