= The Beacon (University of Portland) =

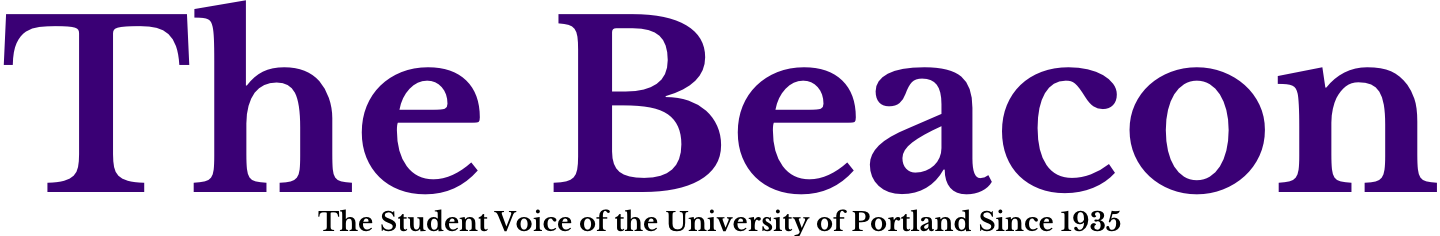

- Type: Student newspaper
- Format: Tabloid
- Owner: University of Portland
- Publisher: Mark L. Poorman
- Founded: 1935
- Headquarters: Portland, Oregon
- Website: upbeacon.com

The Beacon is the student-run newspaper of the University of Portland in Portland, Oregon, United States. The current name of the paper at the private, Catholic school was adopted in 1935. The paper is published online and is a member of the College Publisher Network. Notable Beacon alum include Malika Andrews, Clare Duffy, Austin De Dios, Carlos Fuentes and Chiara Profenna.

== History ==
The original name of the school’s newspaper was The Columbiad, but the school held a contest to rename the paper. The university was named Columbia University until February 15, 1935, when it was changed to the current name. On April 12, 1935, the campus paper was renamed as The Beacon, as suggested by student Alan Kennedy, who won a $3 prize.

In 1999, the paper earned top prizes from the Oregon Newspaper Publishers Association in its division including Best Section, Best Writing, Best Feature Story best columnist and several for photography. The Beacon won top prizes in headline writing and writing in 2000. The next year the paper took first place for general excellence in the contest as well as first place for best section, best special section, and best news story. In 2002, it took the top award for best spot news photo, best feature photo, best editorial, and best headline writing.

The newspaper was awarded first place in the same contest in 2003 in five categories, followed by first place in four categories in 2004. In 2005, it won first place for best writing, feature story, editorial, review, feature photo, as well as second place for overall excellence. The paper took second again for overall excellence in its division the following year along with top prize for best editorial, sports story, review, in house advertisement, and feature photograph.

In 2007, The Beacon only won two first place awards, but took home eight top awards in 2008, including first place for general excellence. In March 2009, the newspaper published a headline of "Suicide claims UP senior" at the Catholic university to accompany a story on the death of a student. Administrators pulled the paper and had the staff remove the story from the Internet, citing issues of sensitivity concerning the family of the deceased. The action of the school was controversial and the private school, and the story was re-posted to the Internet with a new headline within a week.

The paper won the Apple Award in 2015 for best newspaper given by the College Media Association for papers serving 5,000 and less student bodies.

== Details ==
The newspaper used to be published on Thursdays during the school year. In 2016, the paper went all digital. Each issue of The Beacon has a news, living, opinions, Faith & Fellowship, and sports section. The Beacon is a member of the nationwide College Publisher Network. Headquarters for the paper are at the university’s St. Mary's Student Center. Maggie Dapp is the current Editor-in-Chief as of 2026. The university’s president, Robert Kelly, is the publisher of the newspaper and Ed Langlois is the current advisor.
