= Bauccio Commons =

Building on the University of Portland campus in Portland, Oregon, U.S.

- Interactive map of the Bauccio Commons area

General information
- Type: Dining hall and community space
- Location: University of Portland, Portland, Oregon, United States
- Coordinates: 45°34′14.9″N 122°43′37.4″W
- Named for: Fedele Bauccio
- Renovated: 2009

Bauccio Commons is a dining hall and community space on the University of Portland campus in Portland, Oregon, United States. It was renovated in 2009, renamed in honor of Fedele Bauccio in 2010, and renovated again in 2017.
