= Mark L. Poorman =

American theologian, ethicist, and university administrator

Mark L. Poorman is an American theologian, ethicist, and academic administrator who formerly served as the twentieth president of the University of Portland in Portland, Oregon, United States. Poorman was inaugurated as president of the University of Portland on September 26, 2014.

== Early life and education ==
Poorman spent his childhood in Phoenix, Arizona, Bakersfield, California, and Springfield, Illinois, where his father served as the founding president of Lincoln Land Community College. He earned a bachelor's degree in English from the University of Illinois and was inducted into Phi Beta Kappa. He later earned a master of divinity degree from the University of Notre Dame in Notre Dame, Indiana and a Ph.D. in Christian Ethics from the Graduate Theological Union in Berkeley, California.

Poorman was received into the Congregation of Holy Cross in 1977, made First Vows in 1978, professed Final Vows in 1981, and was ordained as a Holy Cross Priest in 1982.

== University of Notre Dame ==
After completing his master of divinity, Poorman remained on Notre Dame's campus to serve as rector of Dillon Hall, associate director of campus ministry, and instructor of theology. He returned to Notre Dame after earning his Ph.D. to become a member of the theology faculty and later an administrator. From 1999 to 2010, he served as Notre Dame's Vice President for Student Affairs and as priest-in-residence in Keough Hall on the campus.

== University of Portland ==
Poorman was named Executive Vice President of the University of Portland in 2011, overseeing university operations, financial affairs, student affairs, and university relations. He also joined the university's theology faculty and helped to create the university's Dundon-Berchtold Institute for Moral Formation & Applied Ethics.

At its January, 2014 meeting, the University of Portland's Board of Regents elected Poorman the institution's twentieth president, succeeding Rev. E. William Beauchamp, C.S.C., who had served as president since 2003. Poorman was inaugurated on Friday, September 26, 2014 at a ceremony held at the Chiles Center on the University campus.

In 2015, Poorman announced that the University of Portland would create a new strategic plan to guide the institution's mission fulfillment over the course of the next four years. The plan, entitled Vision 2020, was launched in 2016 and provides strategies by which the University would fulfill its mission of teaching and learning, faith and formation, and service and leadership.

Poorman teaches an undergraduate theology course on moral formation and ethics entitled "The Character Project."
