= Saint Clement Eucharistic Shrine (Boston) =

Historic church in Boston, Massachusetts, United States

Coordinates: 42.3470°N 71.0897°W

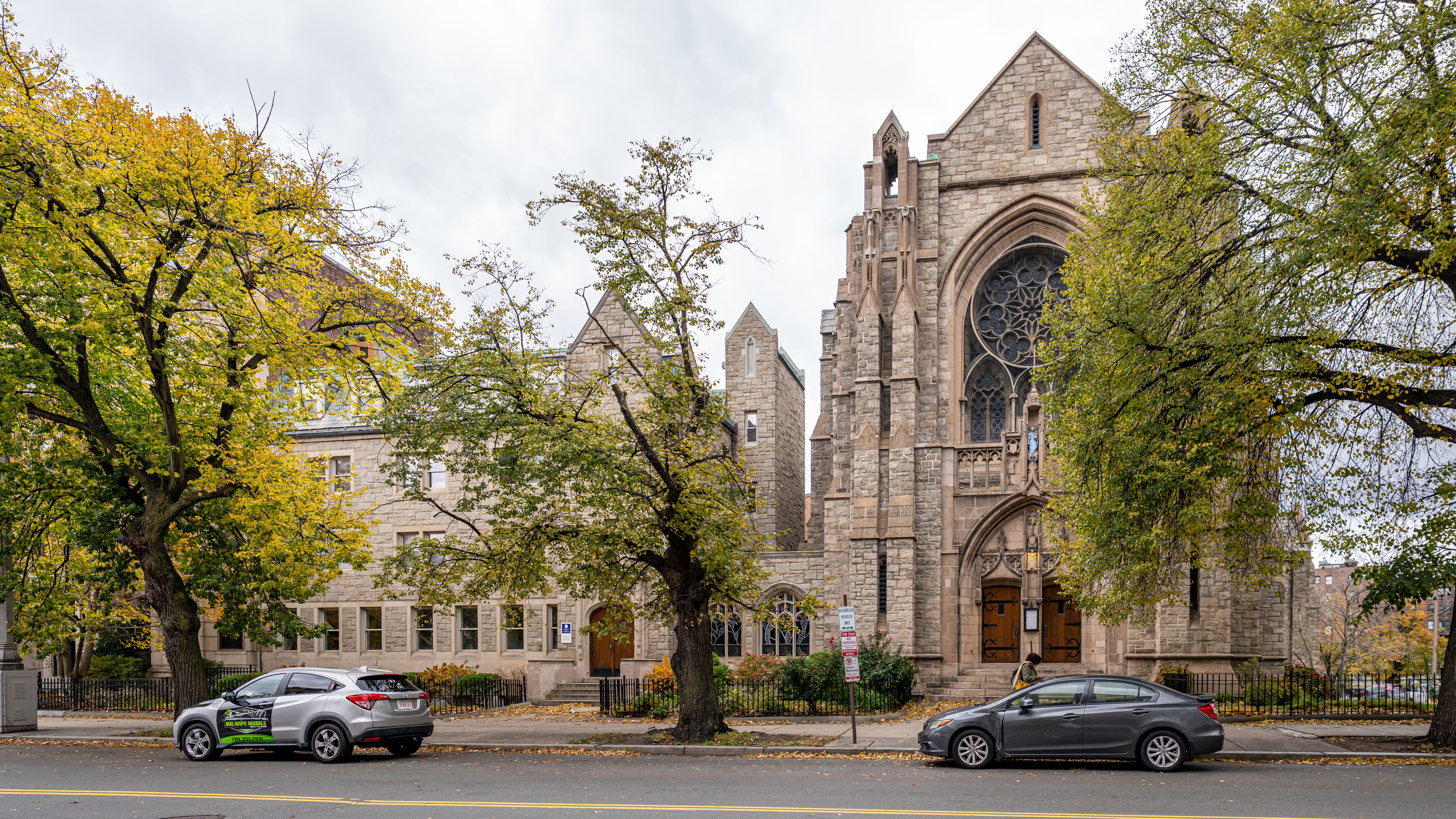
(2025)

Saint Clement Eucharistic Shrine is a historic Catholic shrine on Boylston Street in Back Bay, Boston, Massachusetts. It is dedicated to the adoration of the Eucharist. The shrine is a church of the Archdiocese of Boston and is host to the Oblates of the Virgin Mary.

== History ==
In 1922 and 1923, the Second Universalist Society of Boston purchased land at Boylston and Ipswich Streets in that city and built a church for its congregation, which had been founded in 1817 with Hosea Ballou as its minister. Records of the Second Universalist Society attribute the "Church of the Redemption" to the architect Arthur F. Gray.

When the congregation merged with the Arlington Street Church in 1935, the Roman Catholic Archdiocese of Boston purchased the building from the Massachusetts Universalist Convention in order to make it an auxiliary chapel for the nearby Saint Cecilia Parish.

In 1945, Archbishop Cushing decided to separate it from Saint Cecilia Parish and designate it as a shrine for the adoration of the Eucharist, entrusting it to the Franciscan Missionaries of Mary.

In the late 1960s, the Shrine was designated as a center for ministry to students. Since 1976, the Shrine has been in the care of the religious order the Oblates of the Virgin Mary, and the home of their house of formation "Our Lady of Grace Seminary".

== Oblates of the Virgin Mary ==
The Oblates of the Virgin Mary, which was officially founded in 1827 by the Venerable Bruno Lanteri, is a Roman Catholic religious congregation dedicated to the Blessed Virgin Mary which trains young men to become priests and religious brothers. The Oblate community is located in the attached Our Lady of Grace Seminary, and members of the Oblate community participate in the masses; seminarians often assist the priests as lectors and altar servers.

== Design and features ==
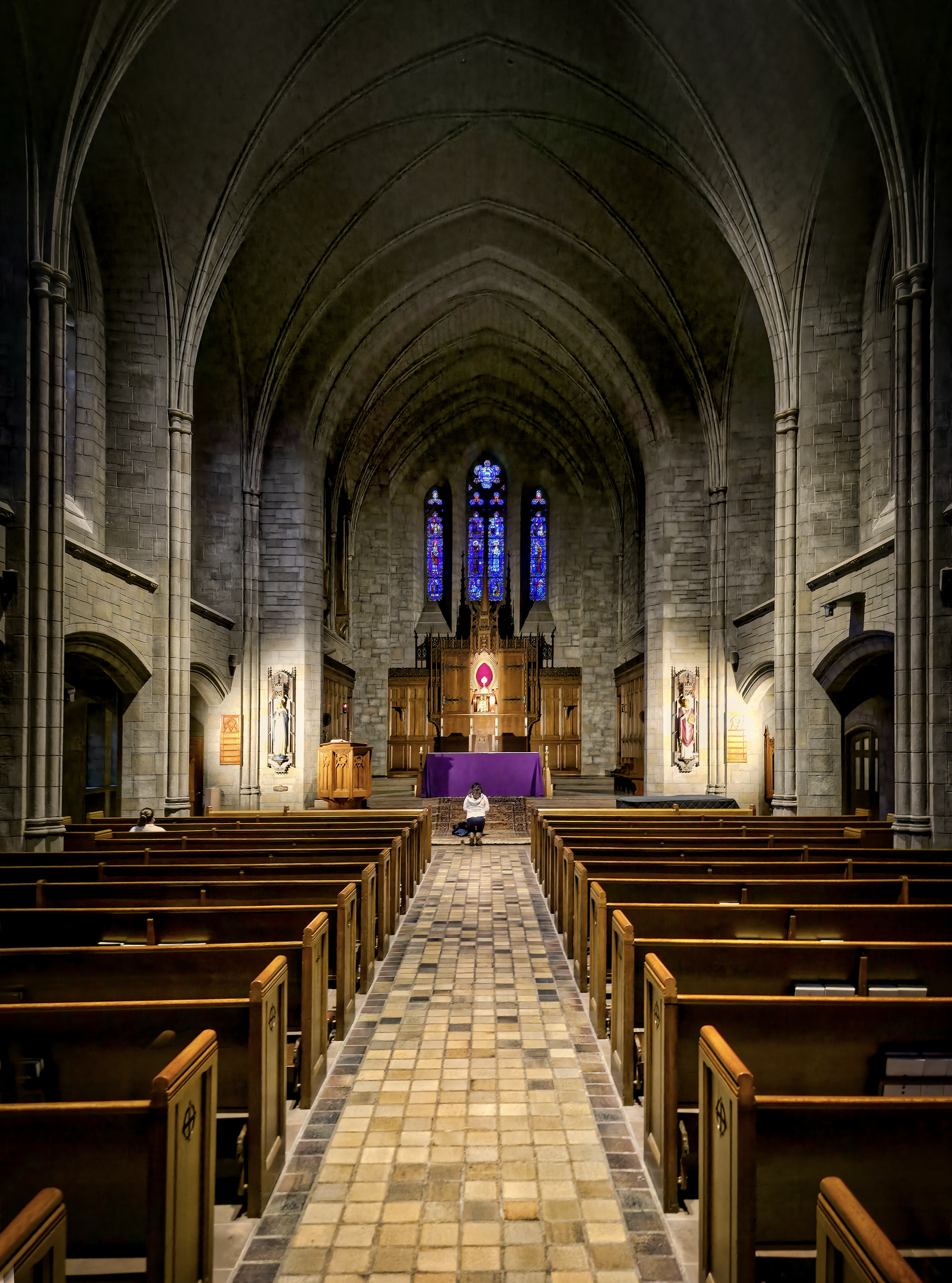
Interior of Saint Clement Eucharistic Shrine

Saint Clement Shrine is built in the Gothic Revival style. Against the back wall of the tabernacle is a reredos in the form of a triptych, which is used during Eucharistic adoration. On the right and left of the center panel of the triptych are angels holding censers, which are copies of images by Fra Angelico, the Italian painter of the Early Renaissance. Below the angels are inscribed the Latin words "HIC EST PANIS QUI DE CAELO DESCENDIT / ECCE PANIS ANGELORUM FACTUS CIBUS VIATORUM", which translates to "This is the Bread which came down from Heaven / Behold the Bread of Angels, made the food of pilgrims." The texts are taken respectively from the Gospel of St. John (chapter 6, verse 59) and from the Corpus Christi sequence Lauda Sion.

== See also ==
- List of churches in the Roman Catholic Archdiocese of Boston
