= William Beauchamp (academic administrator) =

American academic administrator

Rev. E. William Beauchamp, CSC, J.D., was named the University of Portland's 19th president by the Board of Regents on November 20, 2003. He served in that capacity until 2012, at which time he began service for the provincial administration of the Congregation of Holy Cross.

Prior to his appointment as president, he had served as the University's senior vice president since August 2002. Beauchamp joined the University from the University of Notre Dame where he served as executive vice president for 13 years, and special assistant to the president for two years. He has taught at the Notre Dame Law School and the Mendoza College of Business Administration. He holds bachelor of science and MBA degrees in accounting from the University of Detroit. He also holds a master of divinity from Notre Dame, as well as a Juris Doctor (J.D.) degree from the Notre Dame Law School. Beauchamp was awarded an honorary doctorate from the University of Notre Dame Australia in 2005, and an honorary doctorate from the University of Portland in 2012. He was ordained a Holy Cross priest in 1982.
