= Franz Hall =

Building on the University of Portland campus in Portland, Oregon, U.S.

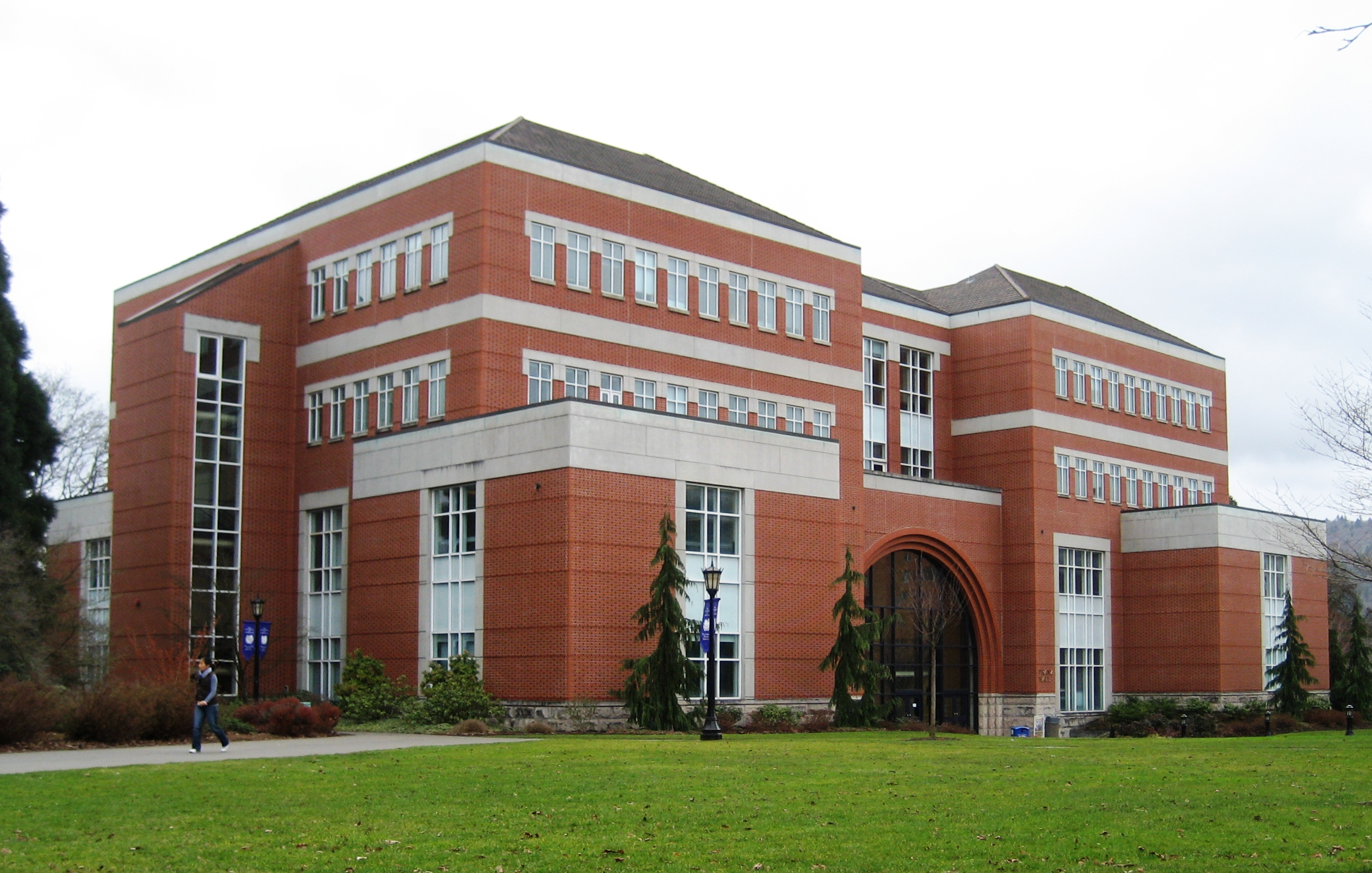
- The building's exterior in 2009
- Interactive map of the Franz Hall area

General information
- Location: University of Portland, Portland, Oregon, United States
- Coordinates: 45.5726634°N 122.7298968°W
- Opened: 1995

Technical details
- Floor area: 78,000-square-foot

Franz Hall is an academic building on the University of Portland campus in Portland, Oregon, United States. Construction on the 78,000-square-foot building was completed in 1995.
