= Multnomah College =

Two-year college in Portland, Oregon, US (1887–1969)

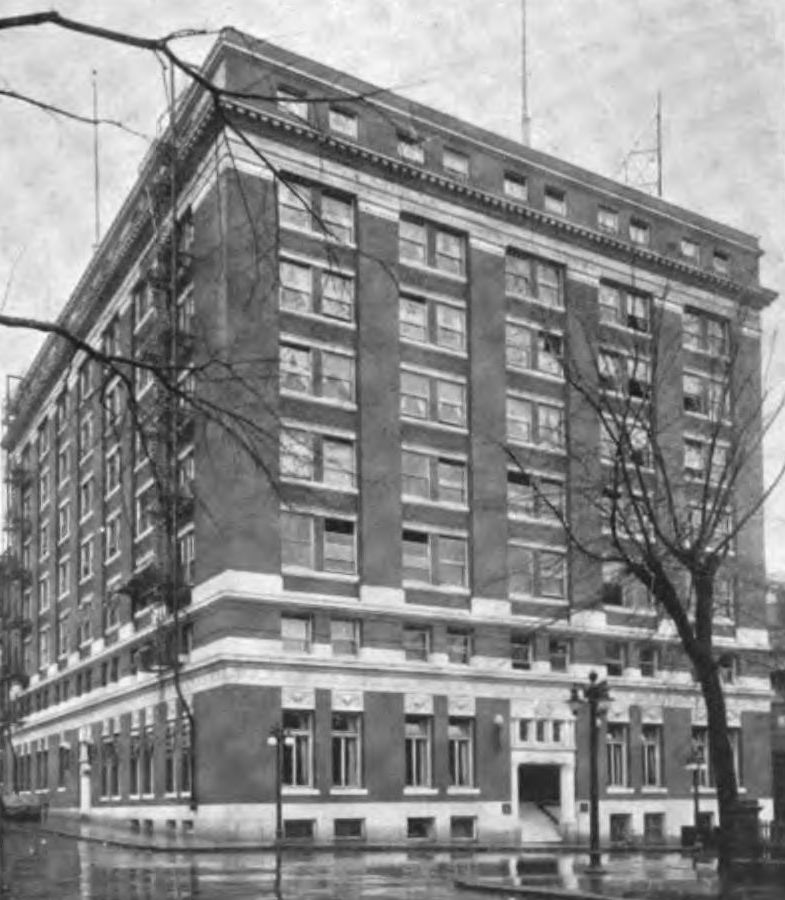
- YMCA building at 6th & Taylor, where school was located from 1909 to 1969
- Type: Private
- Active: 1897–1969
- Affiliations: YMCA
- Location: Portland, Oregon, United States; 45.51806°N 122.6825°W
- Fate: Absorbed into the University of Portland

Multnomah College, was a two-year, private college located in Portland in the U.S. state of Oregon. Established in 1897 as the Educational Department of the YMCA in downtown Portland, the school was the oldest fully accredited two-year college in the U.S. Pacific Northwest at the time it was absorbed by the University of Portland (UP) in 1969.

== History ==
The college classes started in 1897 at Fourth and Yamhill in Downtown Portland when the YMCA, then led by Harry William Stone, started offering night classes. At that time it was known as the Department of Education of the Portland Y. M. C. A. In 1909, the YMCA moved to Sixth and Taylor, as the school needed more space after starting to offer day-time classes as well. The school added electrician classes in 1912, followed by accounting and auto repair before opening an engineering department in 1919. In 1920, the school became an institution with degree granting authority, and then changed its name to the Oregon Institute of Technology.

The school then started a junior college in 1931 before becoming Multnomah College in 1937 for the college portion of the school. All other portions of the school were then merged into Multnomah College in 1945, and the school became a non-profit with its own board of regents in 1946. In 1969, the school decided to merge into the University of Portland, the state's only Catholic university.

Prior to the merger into UP, it had an enrollment of 750 full-time students, including 140 from countries outside the United States, taught by a faculty of 50, as of April 1969. At that time the school's campus occupied five buildings, including the modern-day Multnomah Building. The college was noted for its engineering program, prompting the university to rename its own the "Multnomah School of Engineering" as part of plan, which UP president Paul E. Waldschmidt described as a merger of "boards and resources, not of faculty and students. Multnomah's president, John S. Griffith, became a University of Portland senior vice president under that plan. He remarked to the press that college's mission had been fulfilled "by the development of the community college system throughout the state."

The YMCA building was demolished in 1977.
