= Oblates of the Virgin Mary =

Italian religious institute

- Italian: Oblati di Maria Vergine
- Abbreviation: OMV
- Formation: 1815; 211 years ago
- Founders: Bruno Lanteri
- Type: Religious institute
- Headquarters: Rome, Italy
- Members: 178 (146 priests) (2023)
- Rector Major: Fr. Luis Alberto Constantino Ávila, OMV
- Parent organization: Catholic Church
- Website: oblati.org

The Oblates of the Virgin Mary (Italian: Oblati di Maria Vergine) is a religious institute of priests and brothers founded by Bruno Lanteri (1759–1830) in the Kingdom of Sardinia in the early 19th century. The institute is characterized by a zeal for the work of preaching and the sacrament of confession, according to the Spiritual Exercises of Ignatius of Loyola and the moral theology of St. Alphonsus Liguori. It is also marked by love for Mary and fidelity to the magisterium.

Lanteri first founded the Oblates of Mary Most Holy in 1815, as a diocesan right congregation. Subsequently, after a five-year hiatus, some of the original members re-established themselves as "The Oblates of the Virgin Mary" (Congregatio Oblatorum Beatae Mariae Virginis), and received papal approval from Pope Leo XII on 1 September 1826, about four years before Lanteri's death.

Since the initial foundation, the Oblates have worked throughout Italy and its islands, and in France, Austria, Myanmar (Burma), Argentina, Uruguay, Brazil, the United States of America, Mexico, Canada, the Philippines, and Nigeria.

== History ==
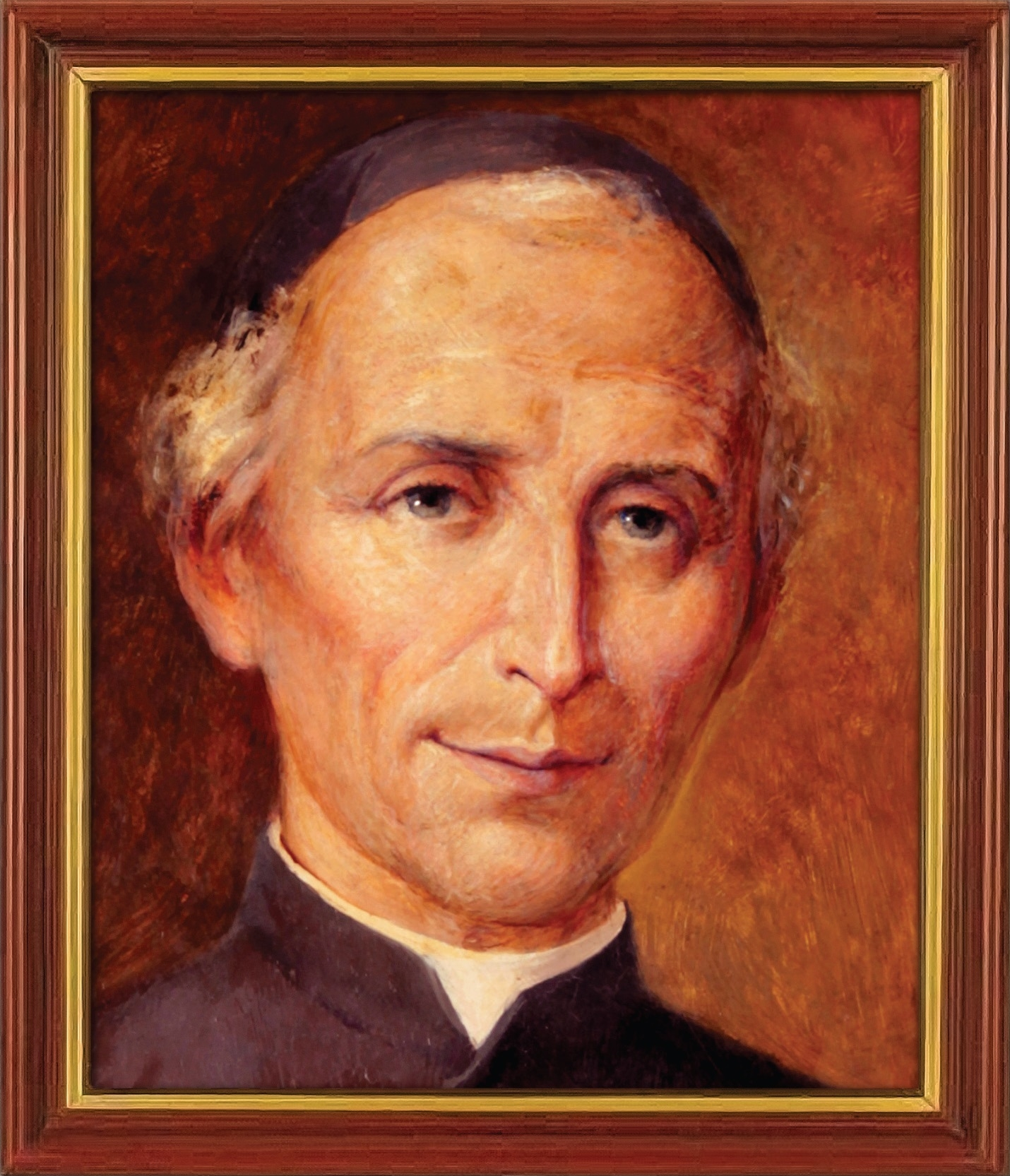
Pio Bruno Lanteri OMV

Bruno Lanteri was a diocesan priest in Turin, Italy, where he met Jesuit Father Nikolaus von Diessbach. Under Diessbach guidance, Lanteri made the Spiritual Exercises of St. Ignatius. Father von Diessbach founded the Amicizie Cristiane (Christian Friendships) and the Amicizie Sacerdotale (Priestly Friendships), groups of lay people and priests committed to a serious spiritual life, and to making an impact on the culture by circulating Catholic books. Father Lanteri worked with these groups for no less than thirty years.

In 1814, three priests approached Father Lanteri for guidance in forming a fraternity dedicated to preaching retreats and reviving the Church in the wake of the French Revolution and the Napoleonic era. Lanteri first founded the Oblates of Mary Most Holy in 1816, as a diocesan right congregation. Despite some initial setbacks, the Oblates of the Virgin Mary were approved by Pope Leo XII on September 1, 1826, with the papal brief, Etsi Dei Filius, almost four years before Lanteri's death.

Fr. Lanteri died four years later August 5, 1830.

The Oblates of the Virgin Mary quickly expanded throughout Italy and into France and Austria. As of 2014, the Oblates had 200 members working in nine countries.

== Charism ==
The charism of the institute draws from its founder's childhood experience of a strongly religious household and love for the Virgin Mary, which especially grew from the time of his mother's death, when he was four years old. At the age of seventeen, Lanteri was drawn to what he called "silence and seclusion," which prompted him to enter the Carthusians. Though he left after eight days, due to frail health, his desire for this lifestyle remained and also shaped the institute.

== Ministry ==
One of the main activities of the Oblates of the Virgin Mary is conducting retreats. They also provide parish missions throughout the Northeastern United States. A mission is typically three to five days in length, and includes preaching on the major themes of the Gospel, confessions, and guidance in the life of prayer.

== St. Ignatius Province ==
The Oblates of the Virgin Mary began their first foundation in the United States in 1976. As of 2010, the congregation has expanded into Massachusetts, Colorado, Illinois, California, and Florida, plus a new seminary and retreat center in the Philippines.

Specifically, the Oblates of the Virgin Mary in the United States of America serve in:

- Boston, Massachusetts: Saint Clement Eucharistic Shrine, St. Francis Chapel, and St. Joseph's Retreat House
- Alton, Illinois: St. Mary Catholic Church
- Denver, Colorado: Holy Ghost Catholic Church and the Lanteri Center for Ignatian Spirituality
- Hawaiian Gardens, California: St. Peter Chanel Catholic Church
- Venice, Florida: Our Lady of Perpetual Retreat and Spirituality Center and San Pedro Catholic Church

== See also ==
- Oblate Sisters of the Virgin Mary of Fatima
