= Swindells Hall =

Building on the University of Portland campus in Portland, Oregon, U.S.

Coordinates: 45.57119°N 122.72527°W

Swindells Hall is an academic building on the University of Portland campus in Portland, Oregon, United States. The 41,000 square-foot building was built in 1999.
