= Santuario di Nostra Signora di Fatima a San Vittorino =

Sanctuary in Rome, Italy

Coordinates: 41.9158°N 12.7915°E

The Santuario di Nostra Signora di Fatima is a church in Rome, in the zone San Vittorino. Although located in the commune of Rome, from the ecclesiastical point of view it is part of the Diocese of Tivoli.

It was built between 1970 and 1979 to the designs of the architect Lorenzo Monardo and inaugurated May 13, 1979 by Monsignor Guglielmo Giaquinta, Bishop of Tivoli. The ground plan is a circle and the vault is in the shape of an inverted funnel. The glass doors of the portal, representing the Passion of Christ, are the work of the Franciscan priest Ugolino from Belluno.
