= Ave crux spes unica =

Latin pious expression

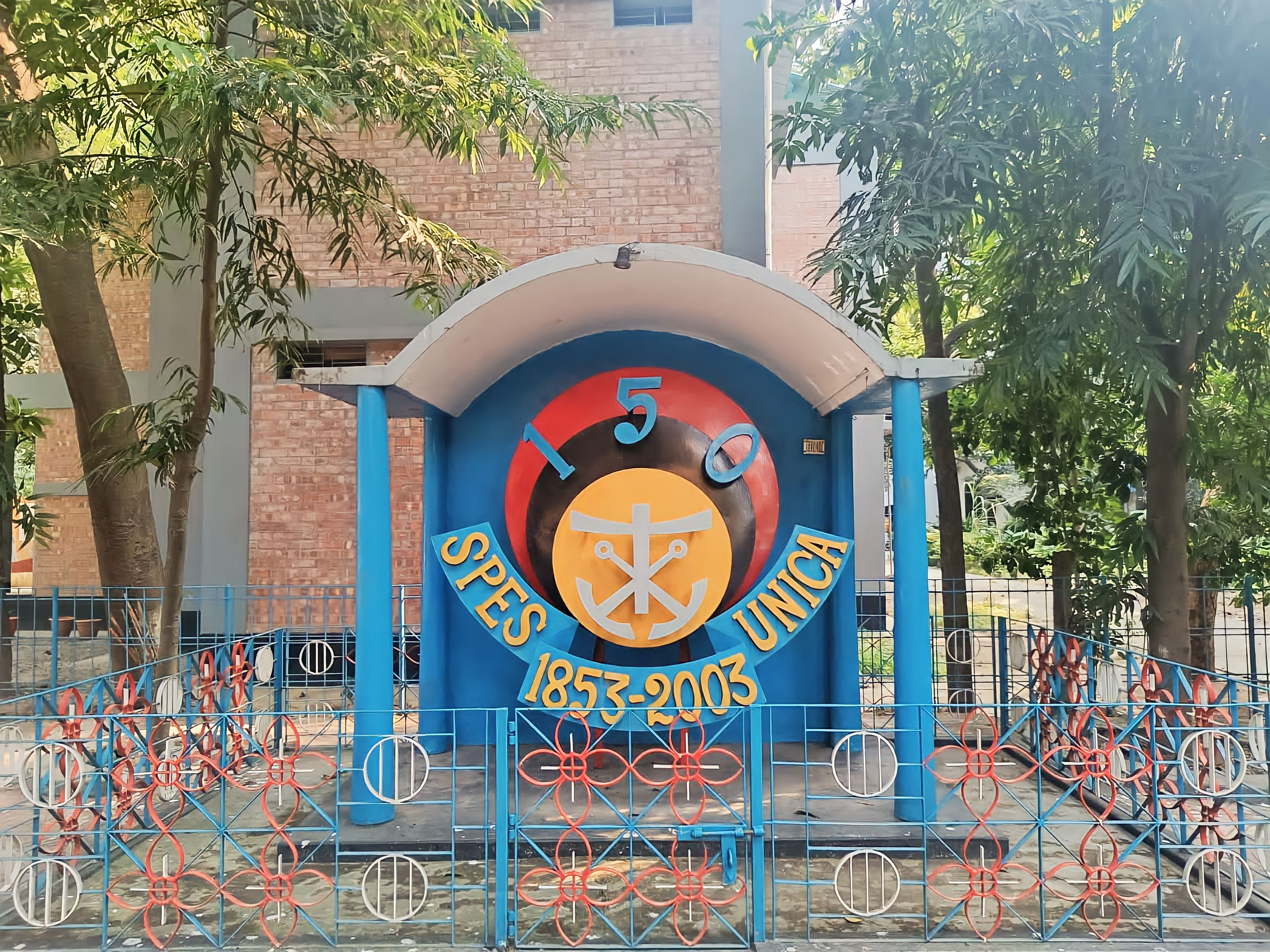
Ave crux, spes unica at St. Joseph Higher Secondary School, Dhaka, Bangladesh

Ave crux, spes unica is a Latin pious expression or motto meaning "Hail to the Cross, our only hope." The expression has a long history in Catholic and Anglican piety and is a motto occasionally used by bishops and church institutions. It is the motto of the Congregation of Holy Cross, Edith Stein, and of Cardinal Daniel DiNardo.

== Notable uses ==
It is found inscribed on the back of the Processional Crucifix in the Church of SS. Peter and Paul, in the village of Yattendon, Berkshsire, England. The inscription forms the shape of a cross, with OCRVXAVE downward and SPESVNICA forming the cross piece. The two share the "V" in the middle.

"Spes Unica" is also the inscription under the Cross at the summit of the facade of the Basilica of St. Paul Outside the Walls, one of Rome's four major basilicas. "Ave Spes Unica" is inscribed on the base of the central crucifix atop the tabernacle of the main altar in the Church of St. Lazarus in Bethany, Palestine.

The American novelist, Edith Wharton, chose this inscription for her gravestone at Versailles.

== Origins ==
The origins are thought to be a stanza added in the tenth century to an ancient Roman hymn to the True Cross, Vexilla regis prodeunt. This sixth stanza is as follows:

O Crux ave, spes unica,
hoc Passionis tempore!
piis adauge gratiam,
reisque dele crimina.

which roughly translates:

O hail the cross our only hope
in this passiontide
grant increase of grace to believers
and remove the sins of the guilty.

As a stand-alone motto, the expression can appear as Ave Crux Spes Unica or as in the original hymn, O Crux ave, spes unica, meaning essentially the same.
