= Sandwich bar =

Restaurant that mainly sells sandwiches

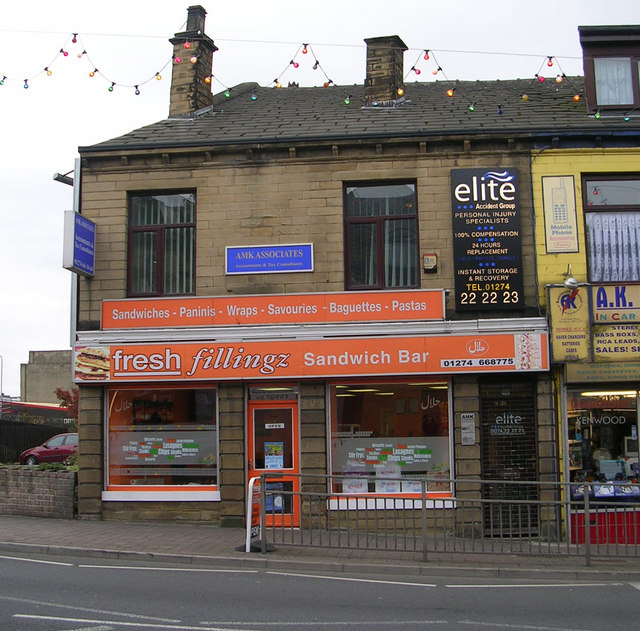
A sandwich bar

A sandwich bar is a restaurant or take-away food shop that primarily sells sandwiches. Some sandwich bars also offer other types of fare, such as soups, grilled foods. and meals. Notable sandwich bars include Subway and Arby's.

The term can also refer to a self-service area with foods for preparing sandwiches.

== See also ==
- Diner – Type of casual restaurant
- Snack bar – Inexpensive food counter
