= Chapel of Christ the Teacher =

Building at the University of Portland in Oregon, U.S.

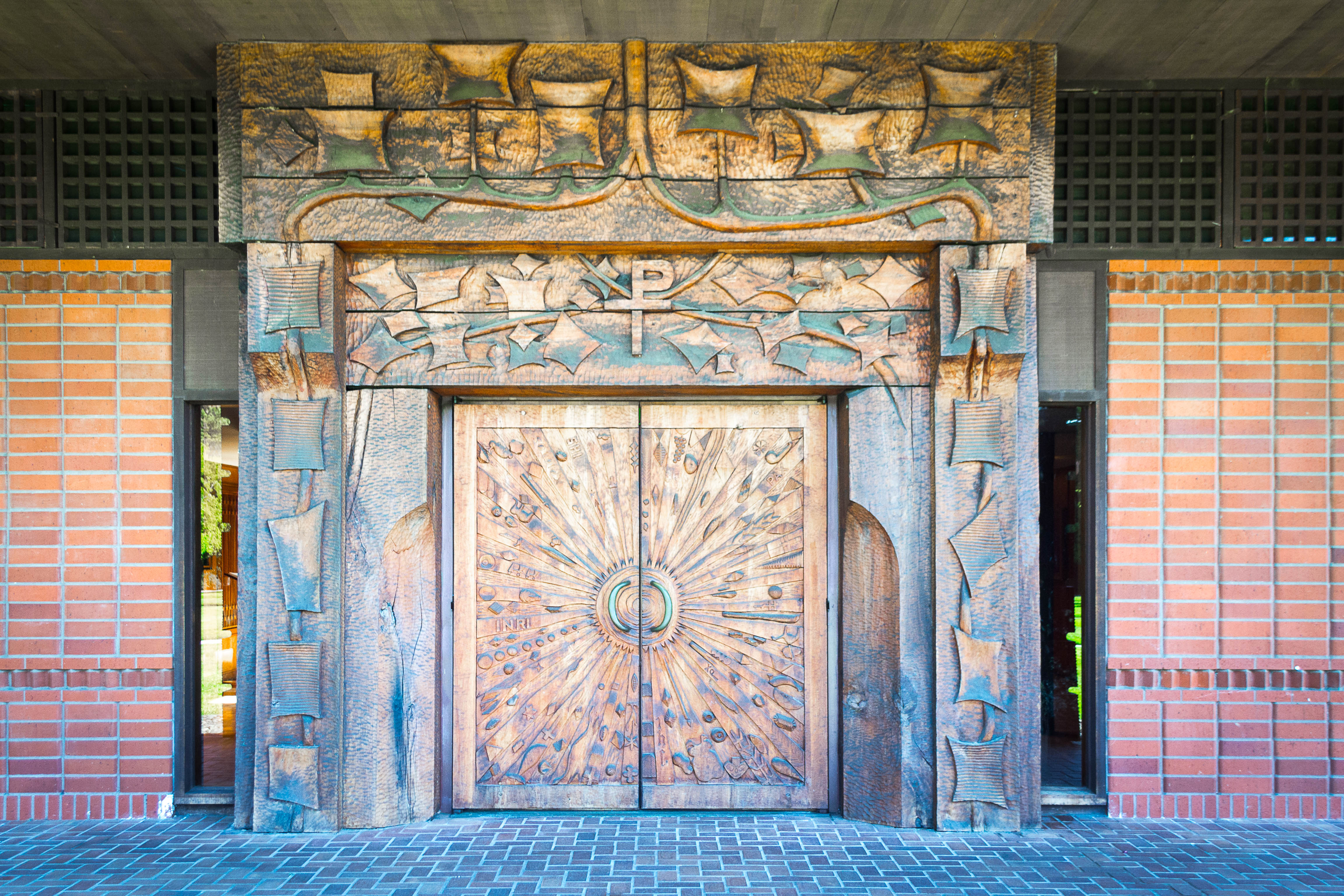
- Doors to the chapel, 2013
- Chapel of Christ the Teacher
- 45.5711554°N 122.7264448°W
- Location: Portland, Oregon
- Country: United States

Architecture
- Architect: Pietro Belluschi
- Completed: 1986

The Chapel of Christ the Teacher is a chapel on the University of Portland campus, in Portland, Oregon, United States. It was designed by Pietro Belluschi and completed in 1986.
