= Bruno Lanteri =

Italian priest

Venerable Pio Bruno Lanteri OMV
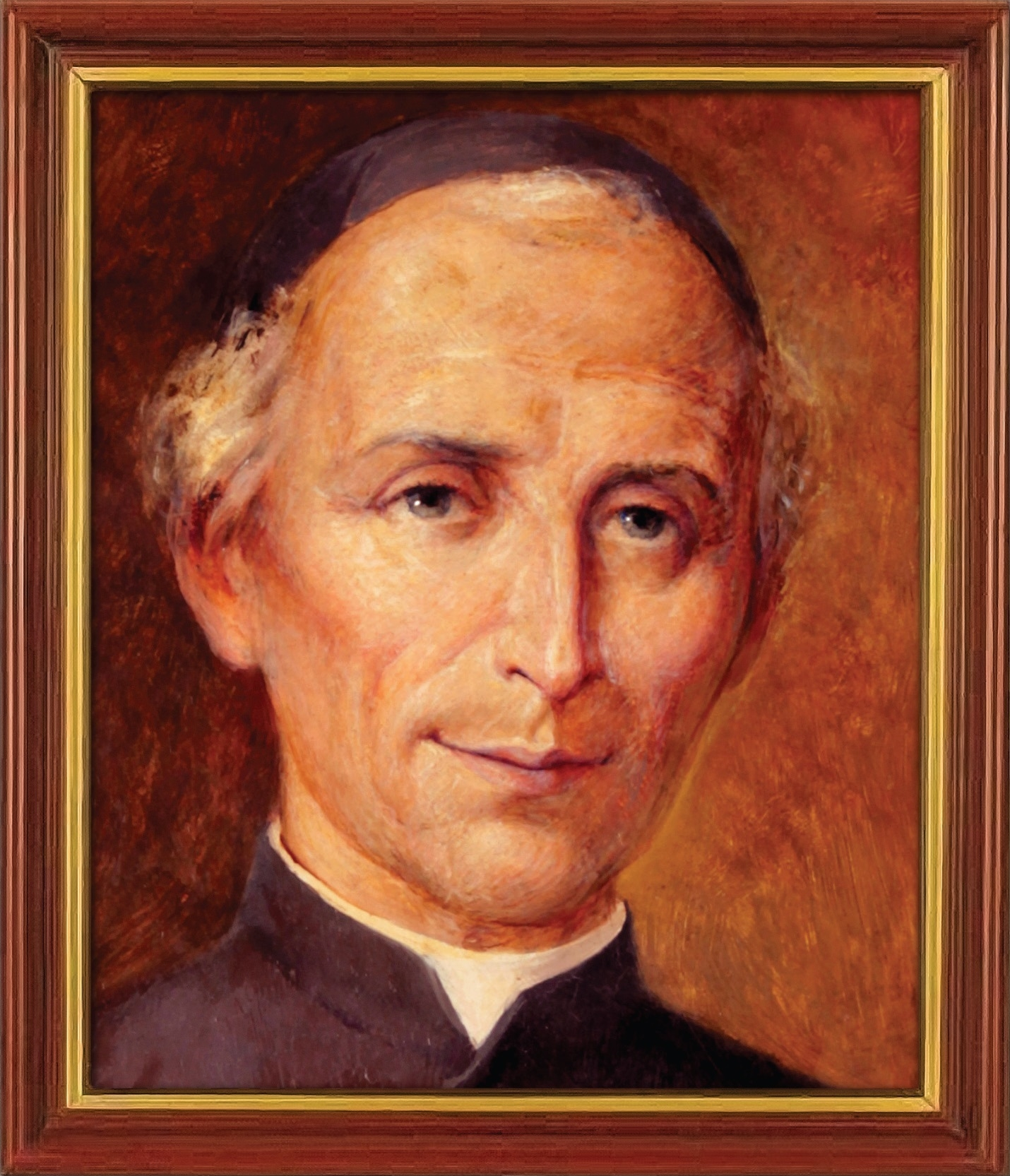
- Portrait by Michele Baretta
- Born: 12 May 1759; Cuneo, Piedmont
- Residence: Turin, Italy
- Died: 5 August 1830 (aged 71); Pinerolo, Italy
- Influences: Ignatius of Loyola, Alphonsus Maria de Liguori, Teresa of Ávila, Nicolas Joseph Albert von Diessbach
- Influenced: Spiritual direction, parish missions, anti-Jansenistic moral theology, Joseph Cafasso, John Bosco, Pier Giorgio Frassati, Giuseppe Benedetto Cottolengo
- Major works: Réflexions sur la sainteté et la doctrine du Bienheureux Liguori (Paris, 1823)

Pio Bruno Pancrazio Lanteri, OMV (12 May 1759 – 5 August 1830) was an Italian religious priest. He founded the Oblates of the Virgin Mary in the Kingdom of Piedmont-Sardinia in northwestern Italy in the early 19th century. His spiritual life and work centered on the Spiritual Exercises of Ignatius of Loyola. He was also renowned for challenging Jansenism by distributing books and other publications that promoted the moral theology of Alphonsus Liguori, as well as establishing societies to continue this work.

Lanteri has been declared venerable by the Catholic Church.

== Personal charism ==
=== Asceticism ===
Lanteri's life was marked by physical suffering from his pulmonary conditions that restricted his public speaking ability and his poor eyesight, because of which he often sought an assistant to read aloud to him. At age seventeen, he sought the quiet and prayer of Carthusian monastic life and, although his entry was prevented by fragile health, he maintained this desire for silence and solitude throughout his life. Witnesses of his life suggest that he reached the heights of mystical prayer during his years of house-arrest under Napoleon (1811–14).

=== Devotion to Mary ===
At the death of Lanteri's mother in 1763, his father presented the four-year-old boy to a statue of Mary in their parish church, telling him, "She is your mother now." From this time, Lanteri maintained a deep and persistent devotion to Mary and communicated it to his colleagues and disciples, going so far as to declare that the religious institute he founded was principally the work of Mary and not his own.

== Works ==
=== Good books ===
After meeting Nicolas Joseph Albert von Diessbach (25 February 1732 – 22 December 1798) in Turin in 1779, Lanteri adopted Diessbach's passion for distributing good books as a remedy with both spiritual and human dimensions. Diessbach himself was converted from the Calvinism of his youth and the agnosticism of his military years by the chance reading of a good book that passionately expounded the truths of Catholicism. With Lanteri he established a close-knit group of laypeople and clergy called the Amicizia Cristiana (Christian Friendship), who worked together to disseminate well-written, edifying books that inspired people to grow in their faith, contribute to society and cope with the unwelcome changes in their lives at the dawn of the French Revolution. The Amicizia maintained catalogues of such books and managed a covert lending library in support of this work. Lanteri also communicated this passion for good literature to the Oblates of the Virgin Mary.

=== Spirituality of discernment ===
Diessbach, a former Jesuit (the Society of Jesus having been suppressed by Pope Clement XIV in 1773) also introduced Lanteri to the spiritual patrimony of St. Ignatius of Loyola, particularly his Spiritual Exercises. In this series of guided meditations through which one becomes more attentive to the movements of the heart (discernment) and the accompanying rules for adapting them to individuals' particular spiritual needs, Lanteri recognised a powerful instrument for pastoral ministry, especially for conversion. He applied them continuously in his own life and prayer, recommended them to others, and established groups of people whom he trained to do the same. These groups eventually yielded to the formation of the Convitto Ecclesiastico (Priestly Residence) and the Oblates of the Virgin Mary, whom he charged to continue this work.

=== Moral theology ===
Lanteri worked to turn the tide of Jansenism, which had become popular in Europe in the preceding centuries and retained many adherents in his time, though formally condemned by the Catholic Church. He himself held certain Jansenistic tenets at age 20, but through the influence of Jesuit Diessbach, he encountered the moral theology of Alphonsus Liguori and definitively rejected Jansenism.

Lanteri subsequently promoted Liguorian moral theology, which is based on mercy and hope in contrast with a condemning and rigoristic Jansenism, both personally as he counselled people and young priests and institutionally through various publications. Of particular note is his 1823 book, published anonymously in French, entitled Réflexions sur la sainteté et la doctrine du Bienheureux Liguori (Reflections on the Holiness and Teaching of Blessed Liguori). It was soon translated into Italian and then Spanish. In this prose work, Lanteri describes the character of Liguori and his doctrinal teaching, particularly his moral theology. The book includes an exhaustive catalogue of Liguori's written works, which was a substantial aid to the Vatican committee reviewing Alphonsus' life and works.

Scholars such as Guerber have shown that Lanteri, together with Diessbach and their associates in Northern Italy and France, was in large part responsible for the widespread familiarity among clergy with the moral theology of Alphonsus Liguori and its usefulness to both combat Jansenism and accomplish their evangelical mission. One persistent point of Lanteri's teaching was to always follow the magisterium of the Church; the writings of Alphonsus Liguori had been officially declared "free of anything worthy of censure", and Lanteri always used this fact in support of his own promotion of Liguori's teaching.

== Beatification process ==
Lanteri's cause for beatification was begun in 1920. His spiritual writings were approved by theologians on 27 November 1937, 20 November 1940, and 11 May 1945. His cause was opened on 4 May 1952, granting him the title of a Servant of God. Lanteri was declared Venerable by Pope Paul VI in 1965.

== Writings ==
- Lanteri, Bruno (1823). Réflexions sur la sainteté et la doctrine du Bienheureux Liguori [Reflections on the Holiness and Teaching of Blessed Liguori] (in French). Lyon: Perisse Frères.
- Lanteri, Bruno (1976). Calliari, Paolo (ed.). Carteggio del Venerabile Pio Bruno Lanteri (1759–1830) fondatore della Congregazione degli Oblati di Maria Vergine [Correspondence of the Venerable Pio Bruno Lanteri (1759–1830) founder of the Congregation of the Oblates of the Virgin Mary] (in Italian). Turin: Editrice Lanteriana. OCLC 3617374.
