= University of Portland =

Catholic university in Portland, Oregon, US

Coordinates: 45°34′21″N 122°43′38″W

- Former names: Columbia University (1901–1935); Multnomah College (1897–1969)
- Motto: Latin: Veritas vos Liberabit
- Motto in English: "The truth will set you free"
- Type: Private university
- Established: September 5, 1901; 124 years ago (opened)
- Accreditation: NWCCU
- Religious affiliation: Catholic (Congregation of Holy Cross)
- Academic affiliations: ACCU; NAICU; Space-grant
- Endowment: $367.8 million (2025)
- President: Robert D. Kelly
- Provost: David C. Mengel
- Students: 3,285 (fall 2024)
- Undergraduates: 2,986 (fall 2024)
- Postgraduates: 299 (fall 2024)
- Location: Portland, Oregon, United States
- Campus: 124 acres (50 ha); Large city
- Newspaper: The Beacon
- Colors: Purple and white
- Nickname: Pilots
- Sporting affiliations: NCAA Division I – WCC; MPSF
- Mascot: Wally Pilot
- Website: up.edu

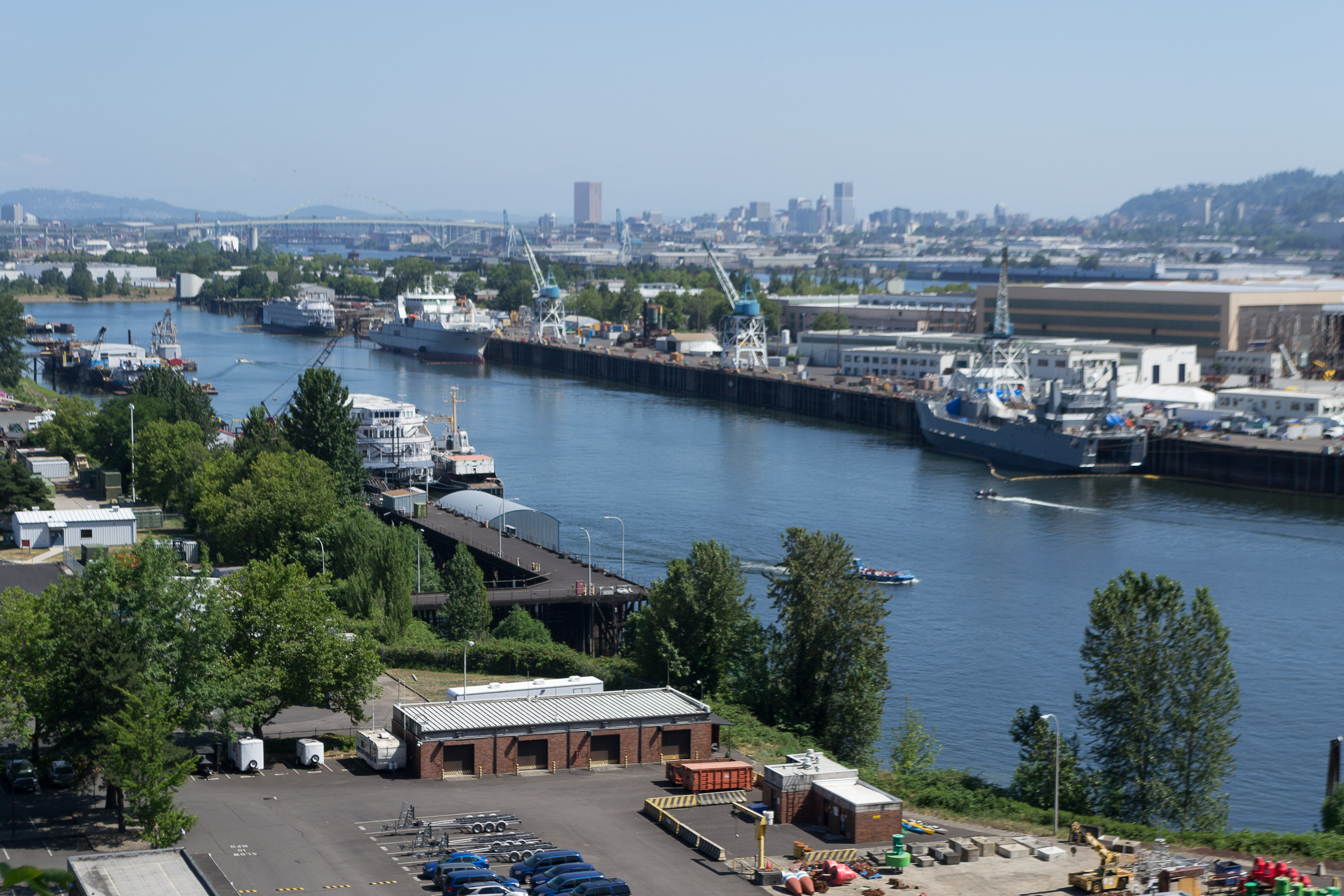
Swan Island Basin and the city of Portland from bluff trail

The University of Portland (UP) is a private Catholic university in Portland, Oregon, United States. It was founded in 1901 and is affiliated with the Congregation of Holy Cross, which also founded UP's sister school, the University of Notre Dame. UP enrolls approximately 3,700 students.

The campus is in the University Park neighborhood near St. Johns, on a bluff overlooking the Willamette River. With a college of arts and sciences, a graduate school, and schools of business, education, engineering, and nursing and health innovations, it is Oregon's only comprehensive Catholic university. UP is North Portland's largest corporation and has an annual economic impact on Portland of $170 million. More than 17,000 alumni live in the Portland metropolitan area.

== History ==
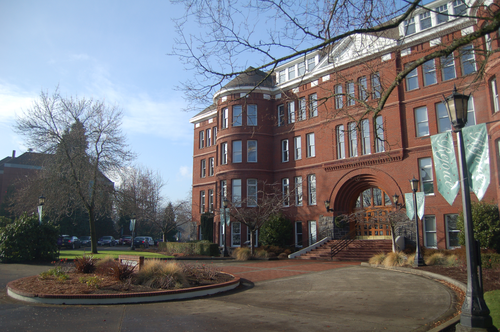
Waldschmidt Hall, formerly West Hall, at the University of Portland

The first institution located on Waud's Bluff was Portland University, which was established by the Methodist Episcopal Church in 1891. Amid financial setbacks following the Panic of 1893, Portland University vacated the Bluff Campus to hold classes from 1896 to 1897 in East Portland, where it was joined temporarily by the recently insolvent College of Puget Sound.

According to University of Portland tradition, Archbishop Alexander Christie, the head of the Archdiocese of Portland in Oregon, saw a large building on the bluff from aboard a ship on the nearby Willamette River. He learned that it was called West Hall and had been unoccupied for several years since the closure of Portland University.

The Archdiocese purchased West Hall (renamed Waldschmidt Hall in 1992) and the surrounding campus with financial assistance from the Congregation of Holy Cross, and named the new institution Columbia University after the nearby Columbia River. The university opened its doors to 52 young men on September 5, 1901, with eight Catholic priests from the local archdiocese serving as professors. At the request of the archbishop, the Congregation of the Holy Cross assumed ownership of the university in 1902.

After two decades, Columbia University achieved junior college status. In 1925, the university's College of Arts and Sciences was founded, and in 1929, a class of seven men were awarded the university's first bachelor's degrees. In 1935, the school took on its present name, the University of Portland. The 1930s also saw the St. Vincent Hospital school incorporated to the university as the School of Nursing & Health Innovations, and the creation of the School of Business.

In 1948 the school of Engineering was founded, followed by the Graduate School in 1950 and the School of Education in 1962. University of Portland admitted women to all courses of study in 1951. Prior to this transition, Marylhurst University had been the only Catholic institution of higher learning to serve the educational needs of Oregon women. The building housing the library was completed in 1957. In 1967 ownership of the school was transferred from the Congregation of Holy Cross to a board of Regents. Multnomah College became part of the University of Portland (UP) in 1969.

== Rankings ==
Academic rankings

Master's
- Washington Monthly: 64

Regional
- U.S. News & World Report: 1

National
- Forbes: 182
- WSJ/College Pulse: 208

The University of Portland was ranked as the second-best Western Regional University by U.S. News & World Report for 2022. The University ranked third for Best Undergraduate Teaching and sixth for Best Value.

== Admissions ==
Admission to UP is rated as "selective" by U.S. News & World Report.

For the Fall of 2025 Portland had an acceptance rate of 97%. Half the applicants admitted to University of Portland have an SAT score between 1160 and 1360 or an ACT score between 26 and 31. However, a standardized test score is not required as part of the application.

== Academics ==
Undergraduate demographics as of Fall 2020
Race and ethnicity	Total
White	52%
Asian	18%
Hispanic	14%
Other (Note: Other consists of Multiracial Americans & those who prefer to not say.)	10%
Foreign national	2%
Black	2%
Pacific Islander	1%
Economic diversity
Low-income (Note: The percentage of students who received an income-based federal Pell grant intended for low-income students.)	16%
Affluent (Note: The percentage of students who are a part of the American middle class at the bare minimum.)	84%

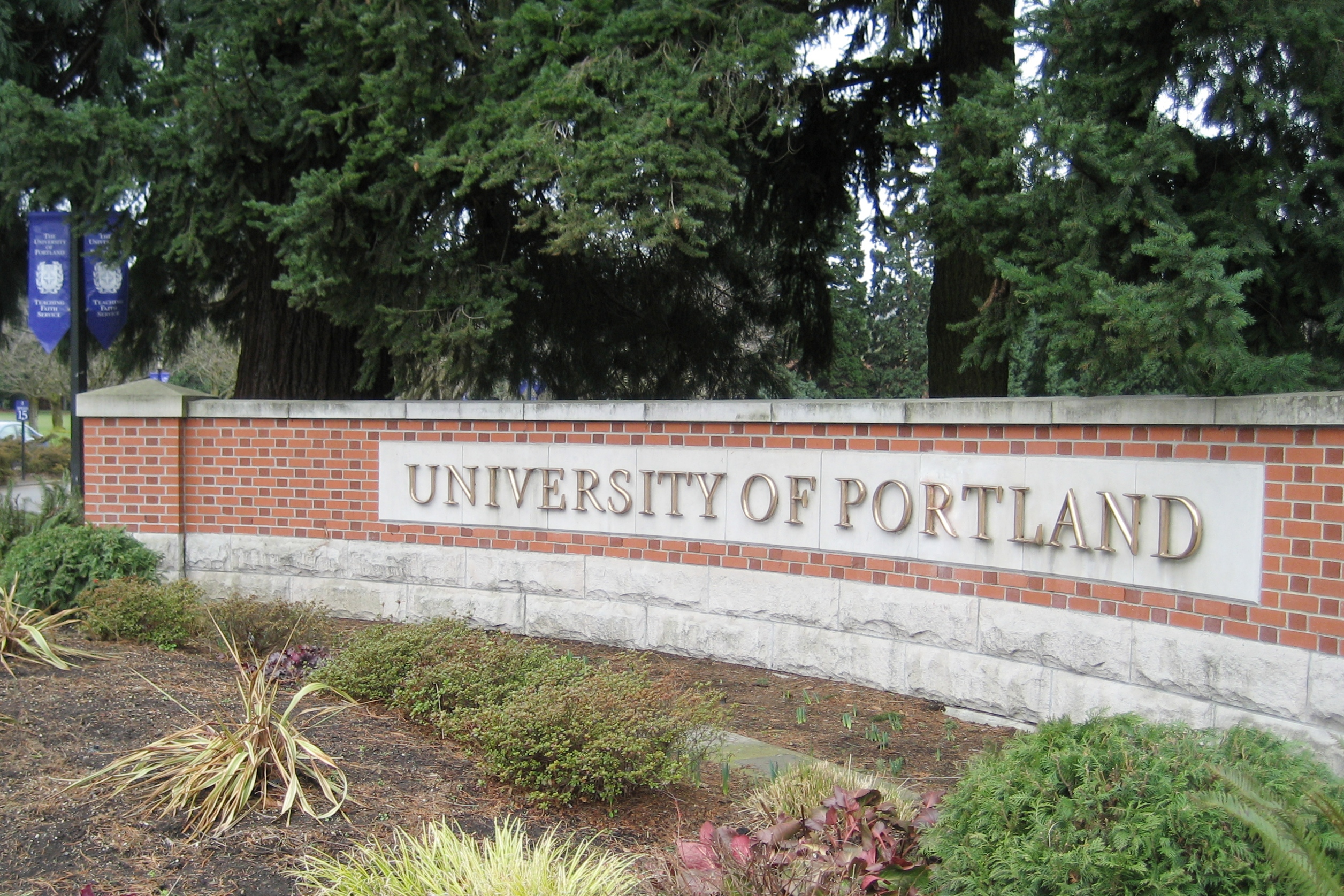
Main entrance to the university

UP has six divisions of study: the College of Arts & Sciences, the School of Business Administration, the School of Education, the Shiley School of Engineering, the School of Nursing & Health Innovations, and the Graduate School. The most popular majors for undergraduates are Nursing, Biology, Marketing & Management, Finance, Elementary Education, Organizational Communication, Psychology, and Spanish.

=== College of Arts & Sciences ===
The College of Arts & Sciences is the liberal arts core of the university and has seventeen departments: Biology, Chemistry, Communication Studies, English, Environmental Studies, International Languages & Cultures, History, Mathematics, Performing & Fine Arts, Philosophy, Physics, Political Science, Psychology, Social & Behavioral Sciences, Social Work, Sociology, and Theology.

Several of the departments offer graduate programs in addition to their undergraduate majors, and these programs dual report to the Dean of the College of Arts & Sciences and the Dean of the Graduate School. The Communication Studies department offers a M.A. in communication and a M.S. in Management Communication. The Performing & Fine Arts department offers the M.F.A. in Directing. This program is accredited by the National Association of Schools of Theatre. The Theology department offers a three-year Master of Arts in Pastoral Ministry. The M.A.P.M. program was started in 2000 in collaboration with Gonzaga University, but in 2010 the partnership ended and the University of Portland continues to offer the program independently.

=== School of Business ===
The School of Business is accredited by the Association to Advance Collegiate Schools of Business (AACSB) and offers both undergraduate and graduate degrees. In 2025, the name changed from "Pamplin School of Business" to "University of Portland School of Business." Its undergraduate program ranked as among the "Best Undergraduate Business Programs" by U.S. News and its Part-Time MBA is placed highly in U.S. News' Best Grad School rankings.

The undergraduate program offers a BA in economics and a BBA in five different areas: Accounting, Finance, Economics, Marketing and Sustainability, and Operations and Technology Management.

At the graduate level, the School of Business offers a MS in finance, a MS in Operations & Technology Management, an MBA, an MBA in Nonprofit Administration, a technology entrepreneurship certificate, and a post-MBA certificate. The graduate degrees are accountable to both the Dean of the School of Business and the Dean of the Graduate School. The MBA program is noted for its diversity within the context of Oregon. Among the five AACSB MBA programs in Oregon, UP's School of Business has the highest percentage of women, minorities, and international students.

=== School of Education ===
The University of Portland School of Education is an undergraduate and graduate program which provides graduates with a teaching license in some, but not all U.S. states. The program is characterized by an emphasis on field experience, and inclusion, with first classroom placements beginning almost immediately. It received the 2002 Model of Excellence Award from the Association of Independent Colleges for Teacher Education (AILACTE).

The PACE (Pacific Alliance for Catholic Education) program allows 15–25 teachers to earn a graduate degree during summer school, while gaining in-classroom teaching experience during the academic year at a Catholic school over a three-year period. PACE students live in community with other PACE students in Draper, Ogden, and Salt Lake City, Utah; Seattle, and Tri-Cities, Washington; Redding, Red Bluff, and Sacramento, California; Fairbanks, Alaska; and Portland, Oregon.

At the graduate level, the school of education offers a Doctor of Education (Ed.D.) degree, a Master of Arts, a Master of Arts in Teaching, a Master of Education, and post-Master's certificate programs in neuroeducation, reading, special education, English for Speakers of Other Languages (ESOL), and educational administration.

=== Shiley School of Engineering ===
The school of engineering was founded in 1948 and grew substantially in 1969 when UP absorbed Multnomah College. Multnomah College had been established in 1897 as the Educational Department of the YMCA in downtown Portland, Oregon, and in 1969 was the oldest fully accredited two-year college in the U.S. Pacific Northwest. Multnomah College was noted for its engineering program and as a result of the merger UP renamed its school the Multnomah School of Engineering. University of Portland's School of Engineering is a perennially top-40 school among the nation's bachelor's and master's degrees-granting institutions, according to U.S. News & World Report. In 2012, it ranked 35th.

In 2007 the University of Portland was given a $12 million gift (the largest in UP's history at that time) toward the School of Engineering by Donald and Darlene Shiley of San Diego. Donald Shiley arrived at UP the year the school of engineering was founded. Graduating in 1951 with a bachelor's degree in general engineering, he would later invent a heart valve and various medical devices that have been credited with saving thousands of lives. Shiley Hall is now the largest building on the UP campus and has won several awards for sustainable design and construction. The Shileys later gave an additional $8 million gift to the engineering school, which was then renamed the Donald P. Shiley School of Engineering.

The school offers accredited Bachelor of Science degrees in mechanical, civil, and electrical engineering, as well as a Bachelor of Science in computer science. A Master of Engineering degree, in collaboration with the School of Business Administration, is offered at the graduate level.

=== School of Nursing & Health Innovations ===
The School of Nursing & Health Innovations was established as the St. Vincent Hospital School of Nursing & Health Innovations in 1892, two years after the northwest region's first nurse training program was founded at nearby Good Samaritan Hospital. Throughout the 20th century many nursing education programs relocated from hospitals to institutions of higher learning; the St. Vincent school became part of this national trend when it joined the University of Portland in 1934 and began granting a four-year degree in 1938. Today most clinical practice still takes place at St. Vincent Hospital and other hospitals associated with Providence Health & Services, a not-for-profit Catholic health care ministry.

The School of Nursing & Health Innovations awards the BS in Nursing baccalaureate degree and the MS in Nursing graduate degree. The Doctor of Nursing Practice (DNP) is a professional doctorate program initiated in 2008. The master's entry program (AEM-UP) enables individuals who possess a non-nursing bachelor's degree to enter nursing at the graduate level. In collaboration with practice partners, the clinical nurse leader Master of Science degree prepares generalists for leadership at the point of care. In 2007, the School of Nursing & Health Innovations was ranked 72nd in the nation by U.S. News & World Report. American Assembly for Men in Nursing named the University of Portland the nation's Best Nursing School for Men.

=== Graduate school ===
The Graduate School oversees the post-bachelor's degree programs that are embedded within the College of Arts & Sciences and the four professional schools. The Dean of the Graduate School reports to the Provost and collaborates with the deans of the various schools to ensure academic standards are enforced for their respective graduate-level courses of study.

== Campus ==
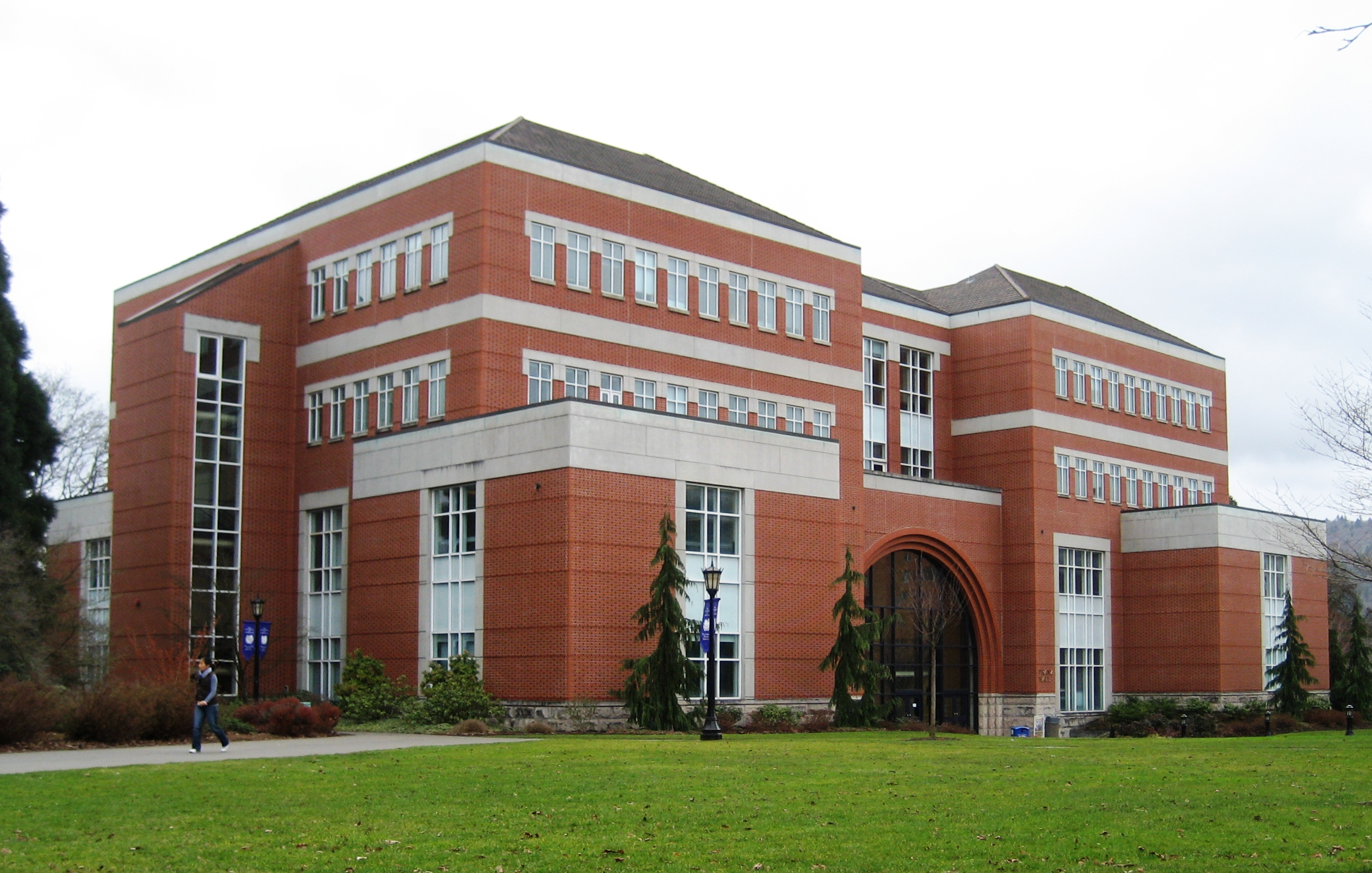
Franz Hall

The University of Portland sits on top of Waud's Bluff overlooking the industrialized Swan Island and the Willamette River. The university is located in the University Park neighborhood of North Portland, a primarily residential area of the city. The university campus is bordered by Willamette Boulevard to the east, the Willamette River to the west and south and private residences to the north.

The campus itself is a traditional college campus with three residential quads, East Quad, Villa Quad, and North Quad, as well as an Academic Quad. The main academic building on campus is Franz Hall. Located at the center of the university across from the Chapel of Christ the Teacher, it houses the School of Business and the School of Education. Other academic buildings include Buckley Center, Swindells Hall, Shiley Hall, Romanaggi Hall, Mago Hunt Center, and the Clark Library.

There are ten main residence hall communities on campus: Mehling Hall, Corrado Hall, Villa Maria, Shipstad Hall, Kenna Hall, Christie Hall, Haggerty and Tyson Halls, Fields Hall, Schoenfeldt Hall, and Lund Family Hall. They are divided into three residential quads: Villa Quad, East Quad, and North Quad. Mehling, Corrado, and Villa Maria are situated around the Villa Quad, and Shipstad, Kenna, and Christie are situated around the East Quad. The North Quad comprises Fields, Schoenfeldt, Haggerty & Tyson, and Lund Family Hall.

== Reserve Officers' Training Corps ==
The University of Portland currently host two detachments of the Reserve Officers' Training Corps: the Air Force Reserve Officer's Training Corps and the Army Reserve Officer's Training Corps.

The Air Force ROTC program at the University of Portland is one of the oldest programs on campus, established in 1951. The AFROTC unit on the campus, known as Detachment 695, is also one of the largest in the country, with its membership numbering nearly 4% of the campus undergraduate student population. In 2004, Detachment 695 was recognized as the top large detachment in the nation, receiving AFROTC's prestigious Right of Line Award. In 2011, the detachment received recognition as the top unit of 34 in the AFROTC Northwest Region. In 2012, Detachment 695 again won AFROTC's Right of Line Award, this time as the best medium-sized detachment in the nation. The offices for Detachment 695 are located in the basement of Kenna Hall.

Since 1996, the university has hosted an Army ROTC program which has grown to include over 70 cadets and a cadre of seven faculty and staff. Offices for the University of Portland Pilot Battalion of the Army ROTC are located in Villa Maria.

== Athletics ==
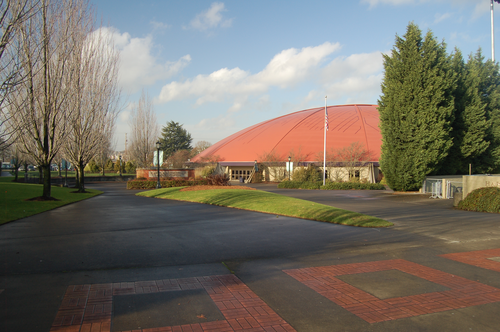
The Chiles Center dome, home of Pilot basketball, which is now painted white

UP's NCAA soccer program became well known after Clive Charles, who started coaching the men's team in 1986, added the women's head coaching job in 1989, heading both teams until his death in 2003. The women's team won the NCAA Division I National Championship in 2002 and 2005, led both years by Canadian international star Christine Sinclair, and the latter with the help of USWNT legend Megan Rapinoe. Home matches are played at 4,892-seat Merlo Field, part of the Clive Charles Soccer Complex on campus. The University of Portland's soccer team is one of the oldest college programs in the U.S., going back to 1910, and was played as a club sport almost continually until 1977, when it gained full varsity status.

Beyond soccer, UP also boasts one of the nation's top NCAA Division I men's cross country teams. The Pilots won 31 straight West Coast Conference Championships through 2010, one of the longest conference championship streaks in the NCAA. On the national level, UP has finished in the top ten at the NCAA Championships five times. In 2008, the Pilots placed seventh in the nation, matching their finish from 2001, and later in 2013. In 2014 the Pilots placed third at the Division 1 national cross country Championships. In 2017 the Pilots cross country program placed second at the Division 1 national cross country championships for their highest ever finish.

Other intercollegiate sports at UP include basketball, baseball, volleyball, track and field, tennis, and rowing. In November 2010, the school announced it would add Women's Rowing effective with the 2011–12 academic year, while dropping both men's and women's golf. In 2017 Beach Volleyball was added as the 16th varsity sport. In November 2005, the University of Portland stood at 25th in Sports Illustrated's College All Sport rankings. UP's previously sponsored football program was disbanded in 1950 due to lack of funding.

As of 2023, The Chiles Center became the designated training facility for the Portland NBA G-League team, Rip City Remix. It is also the designated training facility for traveling NBA teams who battle the Portland Trail Blazers. Portland launches NBA G-League Team

Students participate in club level sports such as men's and women's lacrosse, ultimate frisbee, crew, and water polo, as well as a variety of intramural sports.

== Expansion and development ==
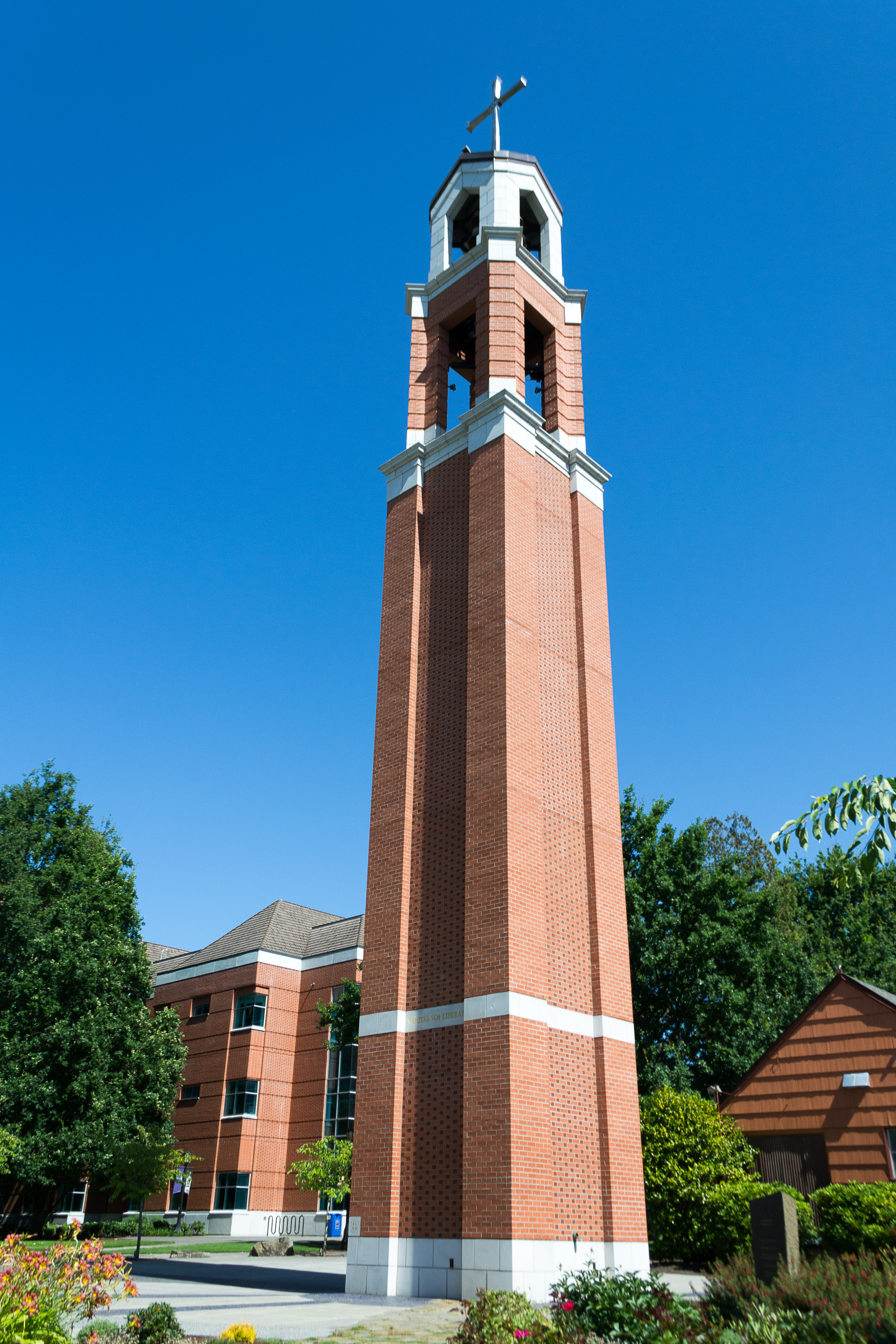
The bell tower

The school is undergoing expansion and renovations for both its campus housing facilities, academic buildings, and recreation facilities. For housing, a new residence hall (Lund Family) was built for the 2016–2017 school year. The university also renovated the existing dining facility known as The Commons, which was renamed the Bauccio Commons in honor of alumnus Fedele Bauccio, who founded the Bon Appetit Management Company which provides food services to the campus.

In academics, the Engineering Building was renovated using a $12 million gift for its expansion and improvement from Donald and Darlene Shiley. Additionally, the university has completely renovated the Clark Library. Elsewhere, a bell tower located adjacent to the Christ the Teacher Chapel was completed in September 2009. At 100 feet, it is the tallest structure on campus, as well as in North Portland, a title that Mehling Hall held previously.

In athletics and recreation, in May 2014, the university began construction on the Beauchamp Recreation and Wellness Center, named after the university's 19th president, Rev. E. William Beauchamp. It will feature state of the art strength and cardio training facilities, 3 gymnasiums, a suspended track, a bike shop, classrooms, and an outdoor pursuits office. It was scheduled to be completed by May 2015. Additionally, in June 2014, renovations began on Joe Etzel Baseball field to include improved lighting, fencing, and artificial turf.

Plans for a $30 million, three-story academic building were announced in March 2017. The building encompasses 65,616 square feet with 17 classrooms, 35 faculty offices, 12 informal and formal gathering spaces, including 4 conference rooms, and the 146-seat Brian J. Doyle Auditorium. Construction began September 2017, delayed a few months while the university was raising $15 million. The hall is named the Dundon-Berchtold Hall, and was completed before the start of the 2019–2020 academic year.

The School recently completed the Shiley-Marcos Center for Design and Innovation. The project cost $40 million and was assisted by a $10 million gift from Darlene Marcos Shiley.

== See also ==
- The Beacon
