= List of Willamette University buildings =

List of buildings on the Willamette University campus in Salem, Oregon, U.S.

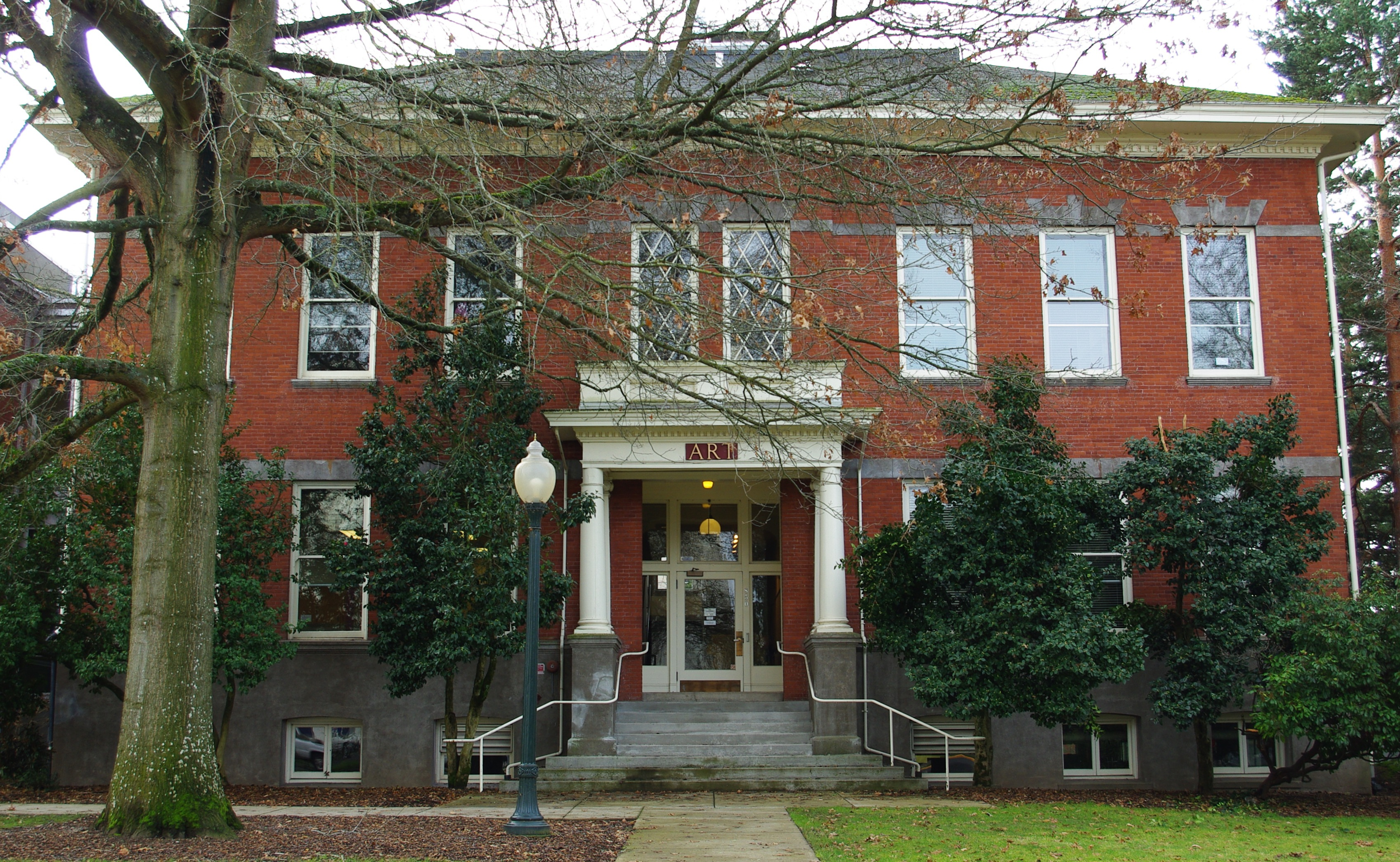
Art Building

Buildings and structures on the Willamette University campus include:

- Art Building
- Eaton Hall
- Ford Hall
- Gatke Hall
- Hallie Ford Museum of Art
- Lausanne Hall
- Mark O. Hatfield Library
- Oregon Civic Justice Center
- Truman Wesley Collins Legal Center
- Waller Hall

== See also ==
- List of Marylhurst University buildings
- List of Portland State University buildings
- List of Reed College buildings
- List of University of Oregon buildings
- List of University of Portland buildings
