= Mark O. Hatfield Library =

Library on the Willamette University campus in Salem, Oregon, U.S.

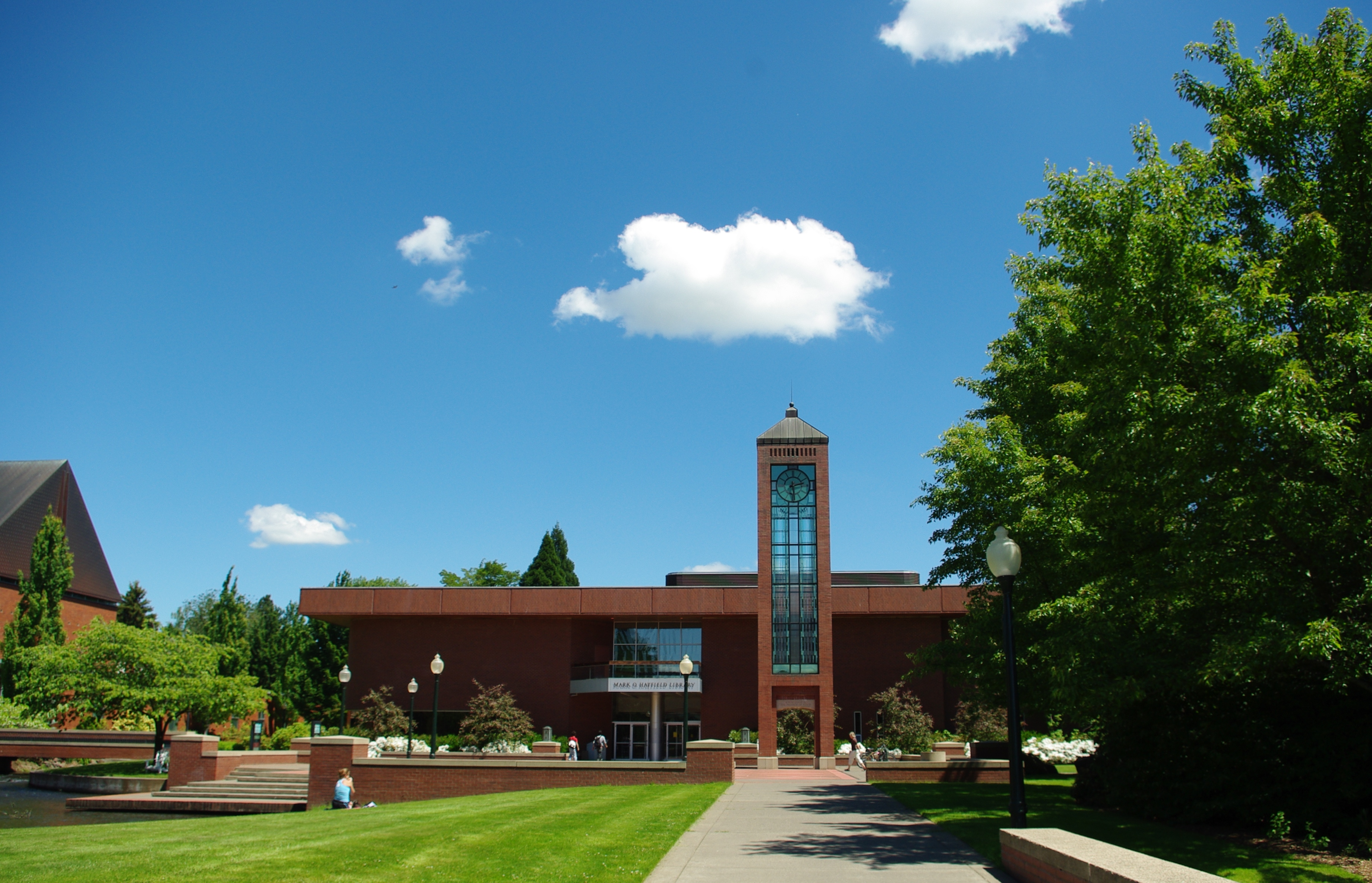
- West face with clocktower
- 44.935565°N 123.030696°W
- Location: Salem, Oregon, United States
- Type: Academic library
- Established: 1844
- Branch of: Willamette University
- Branches: 1

Collection
- Size: 390,000 volumes
- Legal deposit: Oregon's 5th congressional district

Access and use
- Circulation: 39,764

Other information
- Budget: $1,771,376
- Director: Craig Milberg
- Employees: 19
- Website: library.willamette.edu

The Mark O. Hatfield Library is the main library at Willamette University in Salem, Oregon, United States. Opened in 1986, it is a member of the Orbis Cascade Alliance along with several library lending networks, and is a designated Federal depository library. Willamette's original library was established in 1844, two years after the school was founded. The library was housed in Waller Hall before moving to its own building (now Smullin Hall) in 1938.

Two stories tall, the library contains over 350,000 volumes overall in its collections, and includes the school's archives. Designed by MDWR Architects, the red-brick building has glass edifices on two sides and a clocktower outside the main entrance. The building also includes a 24-hour study area, private study rooms, and a classroom. The academic library is named in honor of former Senator Mark O. Hatfield, a 1943 graduate of Willamette and former member of the faculty.

== History ==
Founded in 1844, Willamette University's library was started two years after the establishment of the school. The library grew to a size of 2,500 volumes in 1874. University Hall (now Waller Hall), which was built in 1867, was one of the homes of the library in the early years. The library was located on the third floor of the building. The early name for the institution was the Willamette University Library, which by 1901 was a free, general library with both circulating and reference collections. That year the library collection had grown to 4,686 volumes, along with a total of 2,753 pamphlets.

By 1909 the school library had 6,000 books valued at $3,500 and Ray D. Fisher was librarian. During November of that year the library received new furniture as Eaton Hall opened, and many departments were moved to it from Waller Hall. The library was re-cataloged in 1912 by Lucia Haley, a specialist from New York City hired by the school for this task. At that time the librarian was Dr. Lyle. Plans at this time called for constructing a building where the Art Building now stands to serve as a memorial to the pioneers of the university. This was to be the future home of the library, but the building was never built. In 1913, the librarian was Mary Field, and the collection was still about 6,000 volumes. Field was replaced the following year by Fannie J. Elliot.

On December 17, 1919, a fire gutted Waller Hall, the home of the library. The school rebuilt the interior of the hall, with construction beginning in February 1920. The library was moved to the second floor of the rebuilt structure and reopened in December 1920. At that time William E. Kirk was the librarian and the facility had a capacity of 100 people. By 1922 the collection had grown to 16,000 volumes, and F. G. Franklin served as the school's librarian.

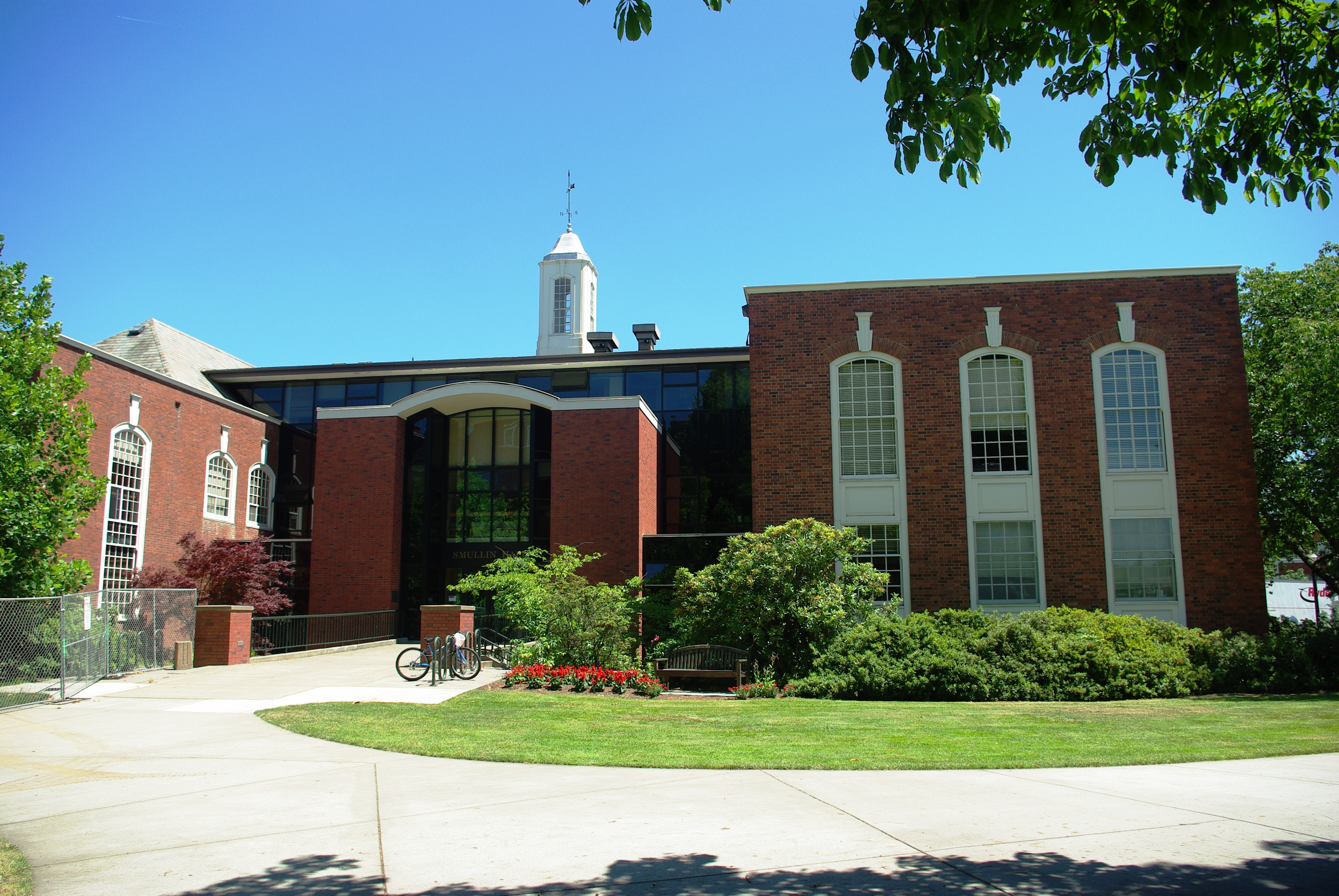
Smullin Hall on the left, former home of the library

In 1937, construction began on a new concrete and brick-faced building to house the library. Completed in 1938, the building housed a collection that grew to 35,000 volumes in 1940. Now known as Smullin Hall, the library building was designed by architect Pietro Belluschi in the Georgian style of architecture. In 1965, the school received a $450,000 loan from the federal government for the library. Congressman Al Ullman worked to secure status as a Federal Depository Library in the late 1960s, with status conferred in 1969. In 1980, Willamette began a multi-year fund raising campaign intended to raise funds to renovate academic halls and build a new library, with $18 million total raised during the funding drive. At the time the library held a collection of 143,000 volumes.

Plans for a new library to be named in honor of alumnus and former faculty member Mark Hatfield were announced in the spring of 1985. Originally estimated to cost $6.8 million, groundbreaking was on April 13, 1985, with Hatfield in attendance. On September 4, 1986, the new library building was dedicated in a ceremony featuring Hatfield, then Senator Bob Packwood, and then Librarian of Congress Daniel J. Boorstin. Then school president Jerry E. Hudson presided over the ceremony that had over 700 people in attendance.

All funds for the $7.4 million library came from private donors that numbered over 1,300 companies, individuals, or non-profit organizations. Large donations came from the Fred Meyer Charitable Trust, the M. J. Murdock Charitable Trust, and The Collins Foundation. Construction was a part of a broader plan to open up the southern portion of the campus after railroad tracks were removed in 1981 and the Mill Race re-routed and landscaped.

The library lost a rare book in 1999 when a vandal used a razorblade to cut out the 30 pages of The Old Days in and Near Salem, Oregon. A limited edition art book, a replacement was donated to the school by the Oregon State Library. In 2002, the library received a $500,000 grant from the Meyer Memorial Trust for the library's archives department.

== Building ==
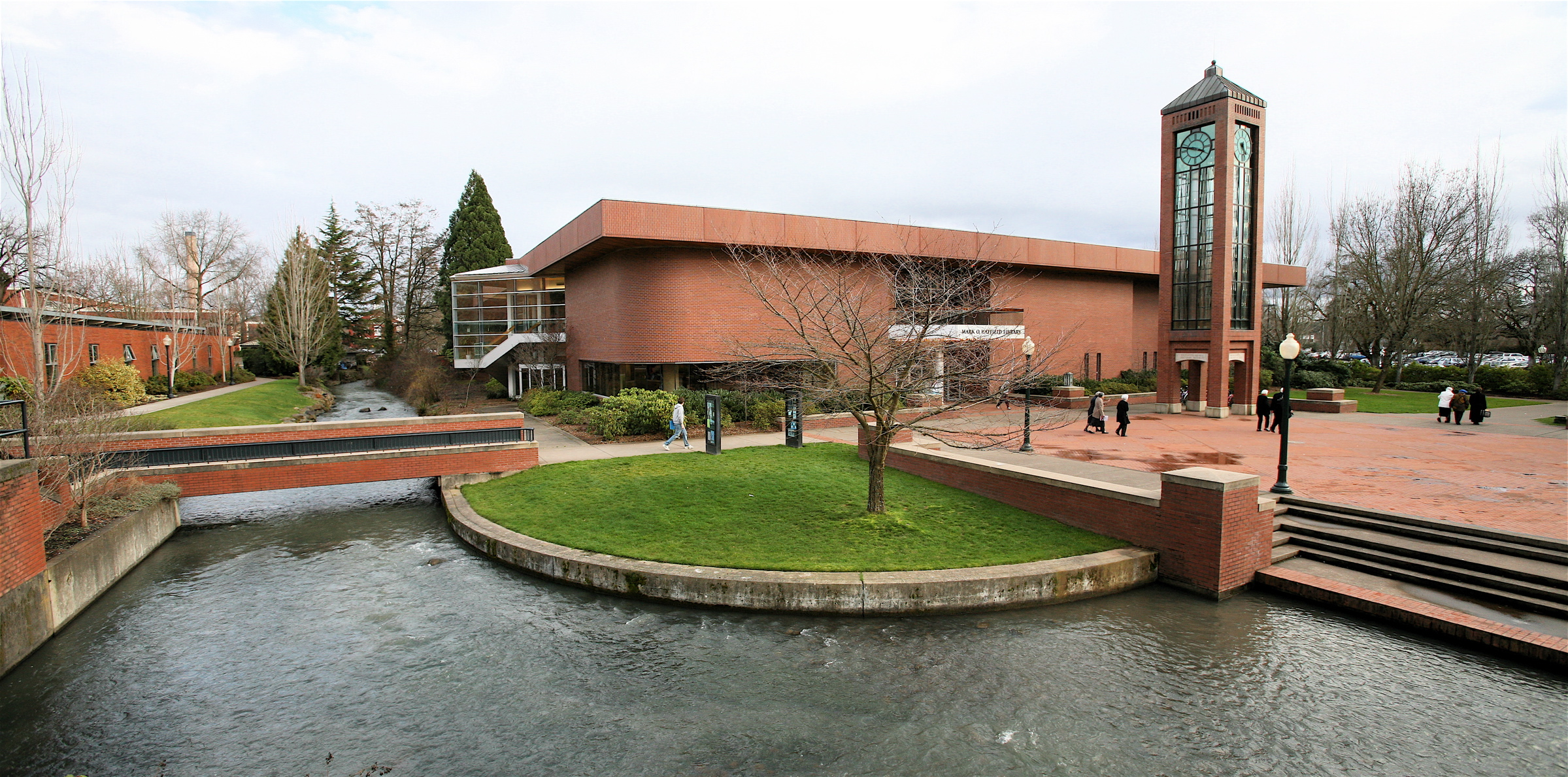
Mill Race, Hudson's Bay, and Jackson Plaza in front of building

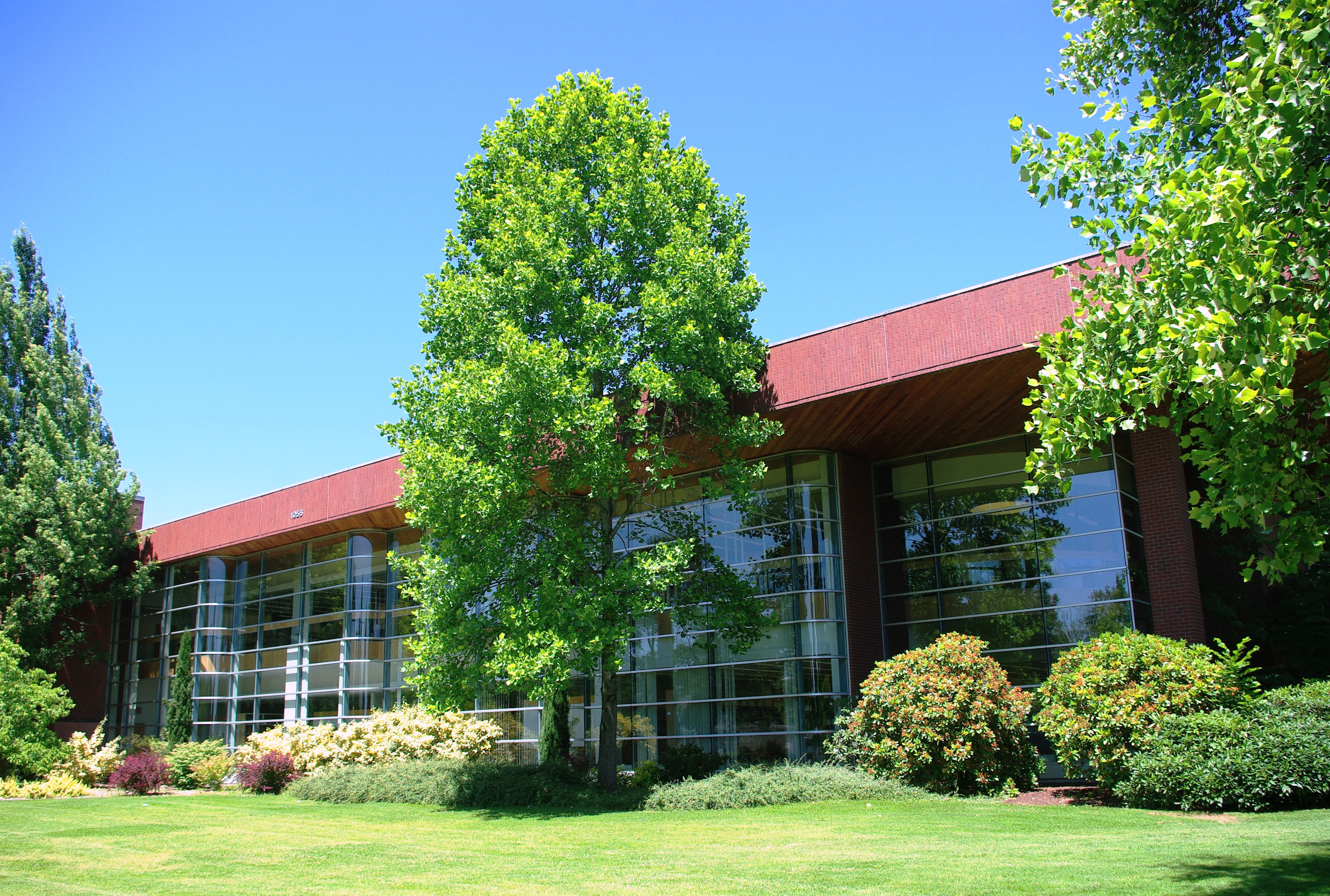
Glass wall on the south side of the library

Located in the middle of Willamette's campus along the Mill Race, the Hatfield library was built in 1986 with the design by Theodore Wofford of MDWR Architects in St. Louis, Missouri. The building is two stories tall and has a total of 58,000 square feet (5,400 m^{2}). Architectural plans allow for the addition of a third floor to the structure.

The library is a modern looking rectangular structure with orange brick and clear glass which is adjacent to Glenn Jackson Plaza and Hudson's Bay, with the Mill Race flowing by on the north side. The north and south faces are clear glass, while the other two sides are brick. The exterior walls taper slightly outward on the brick sides of the building. Bricks on these sides were laid horizontally, while the overhanging roof line contains bricks that were laid vertically. A glass-enclosed stairwell and the main entrance near the northwest corner are the only parts that jut out from the primarily rectangular building.

Inside, the Hatfield Library contains a 24-hour study area, private study rooms, a classroom, the university's archives, and listening rooms. On the main floor is the circulation desk, reference section, and work stations, among others. The building also holds a formal reception area, the Mark O. Hatfield Room, and the Hatfield archives that contain the former Senator's papers, both located on the second floor. Interior space was left mainly open to allow for flexibility with the evolving needs and technology of the library. Artist Dean Larson painted the portrait of Hatfield that hangs in the library.

Outside the library is a 61.75-foot (18.82 m) tall steel and brick clock tower. The tower has one clock face on each of the four sides, a copper roof, and glass running down each side towards the 18 ton base. The glass consists of vertical panels created by taking strips of bent glass and weaving them together. There are inscriptions of various quotes in the exposed portions of the concrete on the tower. Lawrence Halperin was responsible for the landscaping designs of the library.

== Operations ==
Hatfield Library is the main library on Willamette's campus, with the law school's library as the only other library at the school. The director of the library is Craig Milberg, who heads a staff of 18 employees, of which 10 are librarians. Regular circulation transactions totaled 14,158 in 2015, with an additional 1,923 in reference requests.

=== Collections ===
The library contains over 390,000 volumes, more than 317,000 titles, and over 1,400 journal subscriptions. These collections include periodicals, books, newspapers, microforms, sound recordings, videos, government documents, CD-ROMS, and musical scores. As of 2006, this includes 365,609 volumes of books, past issues of periodicals, and other printed sources; 11,508 items in the audio visual collection; 5,147 subscriptions to periodicals; and 337,918 microforms. The library also offers access to electronic sources through FirstSearch, RLIN, OCLC, EPIC, and DIALOG among others. Additionally, university publications such as the yearbook (The Wallulah), the student newspaper (Willamette Collegian), school catalogs, the Willamette Journal of the Liberal Arts, and the Willamette Scene among others, are collected by the library.

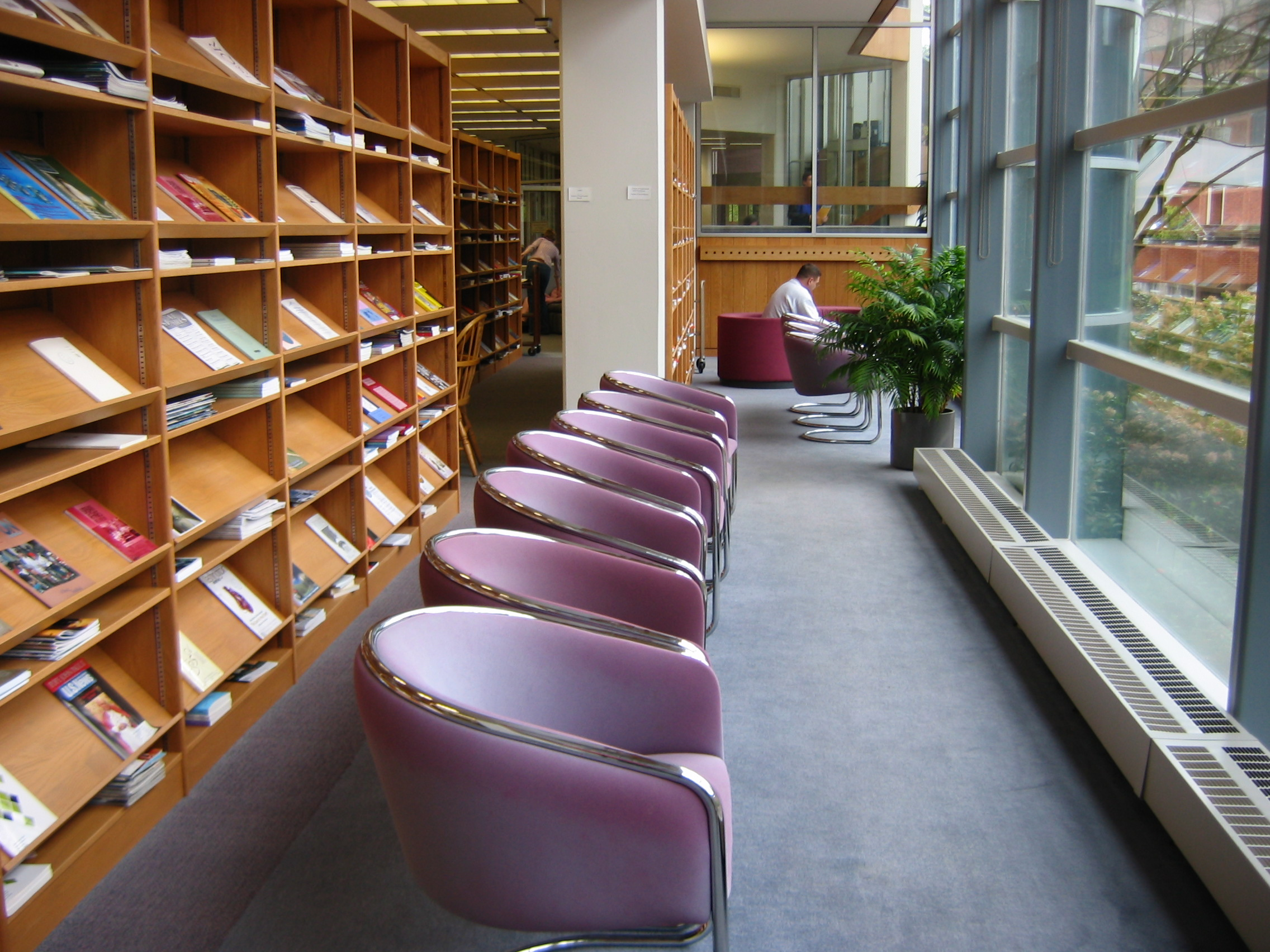
Inside Hatfield Library

Hatfield Library is a member of Orbis Cascade Alliance (Summit) and the Northwest Association of Private Colleges and Universities (NAPCU) lending networks. These networks allow students to borrow additional materials from other member libraries and institutions from around the Pacific Northwest.

Hatfield Library also contains the Mark O. Hatfield Archives containing the papers, memorabilia, and books of the former United States Senator and Willamette alumni. The papers include those from his time in the Oregon legislature through his time in the Senate and after leaving the Senate. Hatfield's personal library is part of the regular library catalog, however the books are non-circulating. The rest of the collection is not open to the public, as Hatfield's archives will not become accessible until 20 years after his death. The library also contains the university's archives on the second floor. The climate-controlled archives are housed in a 1,500-square-foot (140 m^{2}) area that includes offices for staff, including the school's official archivist.

Willamette's library was designated as a Federal Depository Library in 1969. It serves as the library for the 5th Congressional District population. The library selects around 20% of the documents available with areas of concentration in earth sciences, education, history, politics, economics, health, accounting, business, government, public policy, human resources, and others. Additionally, the university selects major items from the Census Bureau, Bureau of Labor Statistics, the office of the President, and Congress. Other materials come from the Smithsonian Institution, the Small Business Administration, the Department of State, and the Department of Education to list a few.

== Namesake ==
The Mark O. Hatfield Library is named for the former Senator and Governor of Oregon, Mark Odom Hatfield. Hatfield was born west of Salem in Dallas, Oregon, in 1922 and graduated from Salem High School in 1940. He graduated from Willamette University in 1943 and joined the U.S. Navy to fight in World War II. After the war Hatfield obtained a graduate degree from Stanford University before returning to Willamette as a professor and then as a dean. During this time he also served in Oregon's legislature before becoming Oregon Secretary of State, and then in 1958 he was elected as Oregon's governor. In 1966, he was elected to the United States Senate and served there until his retirement in 1997. He died in 2011.
