= Willamette Bearcats =

Athletic teams of Willamette University

- University: Willamette University
- Conference: Northwest Conference
- NCAA: Division III
- Athletic director: Rob Passage
- Location: Salem, Oregon
- Varsity teams: 20
- Football stadium: McCulloch Stadium
- Basketball arena: Cone Field House
- Softball stadium: Willamette Softball Field
- Soccer stadium: Sparks Field
- Aquatics center: Sparks Pool
- Lacrosse stadium: Sparks Field
- Golf course: Creekside Golf Club
- Tennis venue: Willamette Tennis Courts
- Volleyball arena: Cone Field House
- Mascot: Blitz
- Nickname: Bearcats
- Fight song: Fight Bearcats Fight
- Colors: Cardinal and gold
- Website: www.wubearcats.com

The Willamette Bearcats are the athletic teams of Willamette University in Salem, Oregon, United States. Competing at the non-scholarship National Collegiate Athletic Association (NCAA) Division III level, the school fields twenty teams. Most teams compete in the Northwest Conference with their primary rivals being Linfield College. The main athletic venues of the school are McCulloch Stadium, Cone Field House, and Roy S. "Spec" Keene Stadium. Willamette moved to the NCAA's Division III in 1998 after previously being a National Association of Intercollegiate Athletics (NAIA) institution. The 1993, men's basketball team won the school's only team national championship, while the 1997 football team lost in the national championship game.

Willamette University was founded in 1842 in what is now Salem, Oregon. A small liberal arts school, it has an enrollment of 1,997 undergraduates and 564 graduate students for a total student population of 2,561. Intercollegiate teams for the university are football, men's and women's basketball, baseball, softball, men's and women's swimming, men's and women's tennis, women's volleyball, men's and women's golf, men's and women's soccer, men's and women's cross country, men's and women's track & field and women's lacrosse. In April 2018, the university announced the creation of the first women's varsity triathlon program in Oregon and ninth in NCAA Division III. The triathlon program began competition in 2021.

== Varsity teams ==
Men's sports	Women's sports
Baseball	Basketball
Basketball	Cross Country
Cross Country	Golf
Football	Lacrosse
Golf	Soccer
Soccer	Softball
Swimming	Swimming
Tennis	Tennis
Track and field	Track and field
	Triathlon
	Volleyball

=== Basketball ===
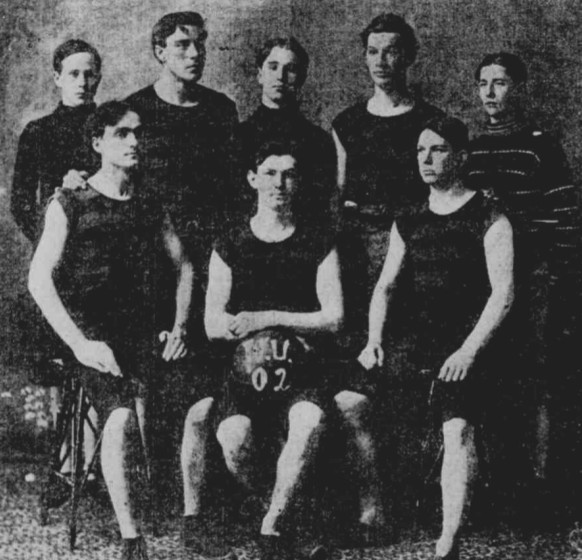
1902 basketball team

From 1923 until 1974 the basketball team played home games at the Willamette Gymnasium, now the Theatre Playhouse. The men's team won or shared the conference title in 1949 to 1952, and 1958 to 1960. The Bearcats appeared in the NAIA Division I men's basketball national tournament 3 times; 1960, 1972, 1975.

The Bearcats lost in the first round each year. In 1993, the men's basketball team won the NAIA Division II national championship, with coach Gordie James winning national coach of the year honors.

=== Football ===
The Willamette football team started in 1894, winning their first game against Pacific University 18 to 4, and finishing the season 1–4–1, losing four games and tying another against the Salem YMCA. In 1895, they went 2–2, including two losses to the University of Oregon and one win against Oregon Agricultural College, today's Oregon State University. During the early years of the program teams played a hodgepodge of other teams including games against the school's alumni, the University of Oregon School of Law, the Chemawa Indian School, the Multnomah Athletic Club, Hill Military Academy, Reed College, Mt. Angel College, and the Vancouver Barracks among others. In 1926, Willamette was a founding member of the Northwest Conference along with Pacific, rival Linfield College, Whitman College, the College of Puget Sound, and the College of Idaho, and is still a member of the conference.

On December 6, 1941, the team played the University of Hawaii in Honolulu, losing 20 to 6 in what was supposed to be the first of two post-season games. The following day, December 7, 1941, Japan attacked the nearby naval base at Pearl Harbor, stranding the team on Hawaii. The military pressed the team into service to defend the island from possible invasion by giving the players rifles, having them lay barbed wire, posting them to defend storage tanks above the city, and using them as police. Willamette's team and boosters were able to leave aboard the ocean liner SS President Coolidge on December 19, and arrived in San Francisco on December 25.

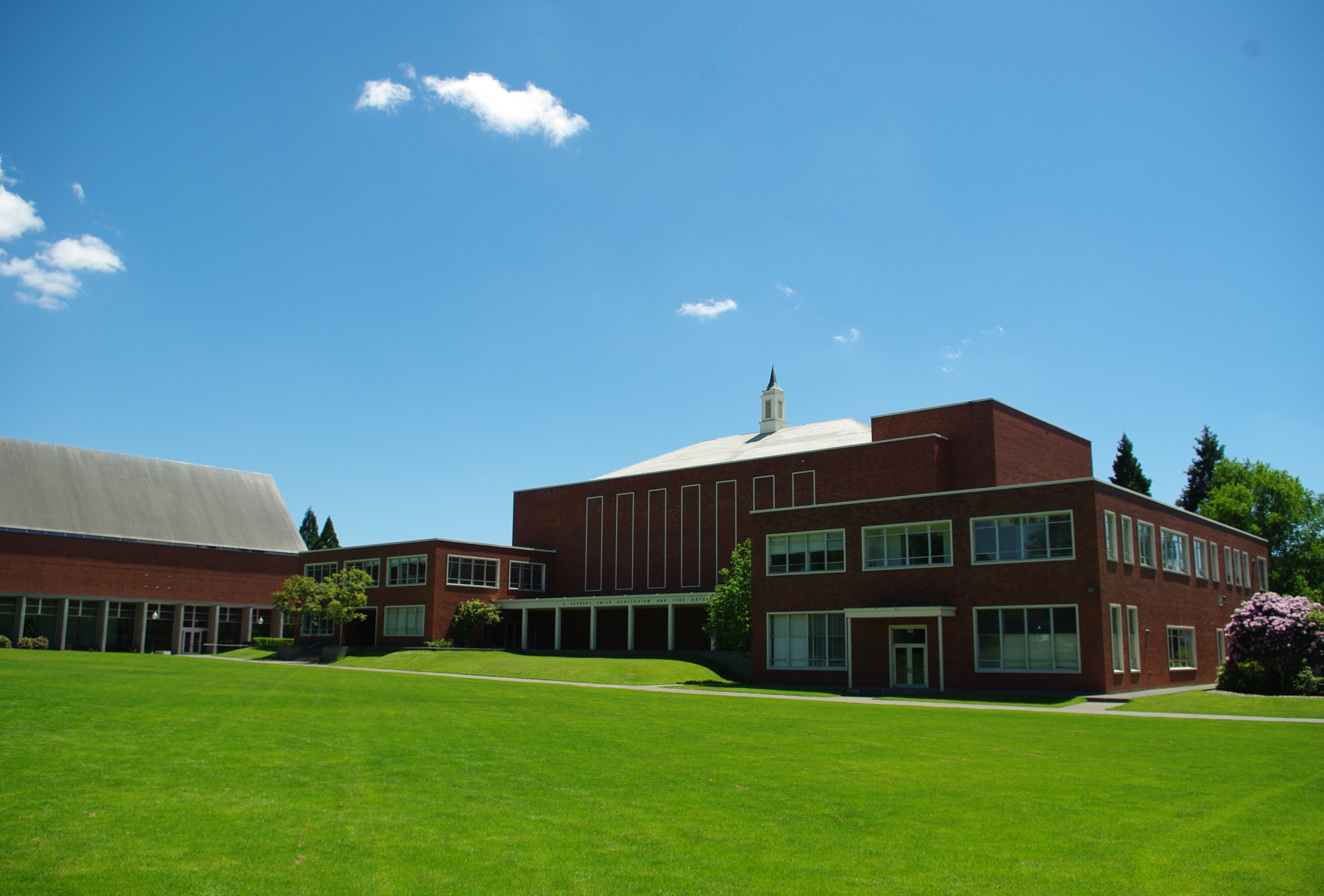
The Quad, former site of Sweetland Field

During World War II, the school played abbreviated schedules, and did not field a team in 1945, with a return to normalcy in 1946. The school had previously not fielded teams in 1897 and 1898 due to the Spanish–American War and in 1918 due to World War I. Willamette played their first game at the new McCulloch Stadium in 1950, beating Central Washington, 21–0. Previously teams played at Sweetland Field, named after former athletic director and coach Dr. George Sweetland, located on campus where the school's Quad is situated south of Waller and Eaton halls.

In October 1997, Liz Heaston became the first female player in a college football game, kicking two extra points in the game at McCulloch against Linfield. The team was coached by future Boise State and Colorado coach Dan Hawkins, who led the team to a 40–11–1 record from 1993 to 1997. In 2008, Willamette ended the regular season undefeated at 10–0 and winning a conference championship. The team was ranked as high as fourth in Division III, and won first round playoff game. The team lost in the second round of the playoffs to defending champion Wisconsin-Whitewater, 30–27, and finished the year 11–1.

Willamette's team has won conference championships in the Northwest Conference 23 times, most recently during the 2008 season. Other championships were in 1929, 1934 to 1938, 1940 to 1942, 1946, 1947, 1954, 1958 to 1960, 1967, 1968, 1971, 1995 to 1997, and 1999. Willamette made the playoffs in 1968, 1996, 1997, 1999, 2004, and 2008. The 1997 team made the school's only appearance in a national championship, losing to 14–7 to the University of Findlay in the NAIA title game. Willamette and the conference moved to the NCAA's Division II in 1998. The university's overall record through the 2008 season is 472–374–38 and a .555 winning percentage. Former head coach Ted Ogdahl holds the school records for most victories at 98 and for most seasons at the school with 20, compiling a 98–64–10 mark from 1952 to 1971. Roy "Spec" Keene is in second place in both categories with an 84–51–6 record over 17 seasons from 1926 to 1942.

=== Soccer ===
From 1987 to 1991, the Bearcat women won five straight NAIA District II titles. In 1998, the women's soccer team compiled a 19–1–4 record and lost in the NCAA Division III national semifinal game. The team finished 16–1–2 in 2003, but missed the playoffs after finishing in second place in the conference. From 1997 to 2004 the women's team had a 74-game home unbeaten streak. The women won conference championships from 1993 to 1999.

=== Track and field ===
The men's track team won conference championships in 1951 to 1953, 1961, and 1966. From 1981 to 1987 the men's track and field team won seven consecutive conference titles, coached by Charles Bowles. Beth Fitzgerald won the 800m national championship in 1999, while Jimmy Watts won the title for the decathlon. Race walker Olympian Andrew Hermann graduated from the university in 1993. From 2002 to 2006, both the men's and the women's track teams won consecutive conference titles. The men's team was led by multiple NCAA champion and later Olympic runner Nick Symmonds from 2003 to 2006. The Bearcat women had last won a title in 1978.

=== Other sports ===
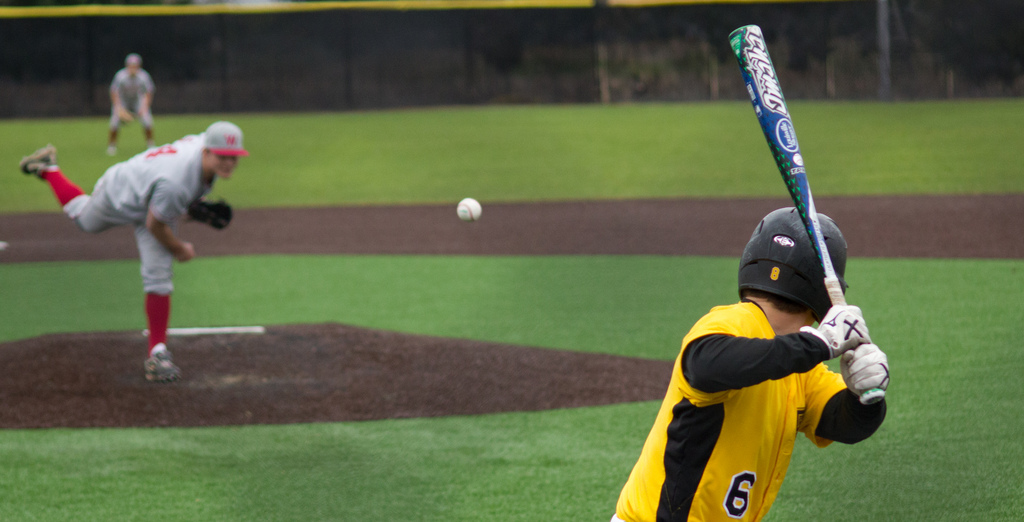
Willamette v Pacific Lutheran baseball game in 2013

In 2002, the men's cross country team placed fifth at the Division III national championship after winning their second conference title in a row. The women's cross country team had its highest finish in 2003, placing eighth at the Division III championship after winning a their second conference championship in 2002. Men's golf won conference titles in 1999 and 2003. The volleyball team won five straight conference championships from 1992 to 1996. In 2006 and 2007, Sarah Zerzan won the NCAA Division III individual title in cross country. The swimming program at the school started in 1974. From 1978 to 1982 swimmer Steve Koga was an All-American four times after winning five national title.

Softball was added at Willamette in 1981. From 1985 to 1999, the softball team had a losing record each season except 1993. In 2000, the team was ranked for the first time in the program's history. That season the team opened its first home field, located next to the city's railroad station on land donated by the railroad. Nikki Franchi became the school's first All-American in softball in 2008 while setting school records for strikeouts and wins in a season.

The Bearcats baseball team's career leader in wins as a coach is David Wong with 286. He coached the team for 13 seasons from 1991 to 2003 and earned a 286-220-3 record. In 1950, 1953, 1955, 1969, 1986, 1998, and 2001 the baseball team won the Northwest Conference title.

Willamette used to field a wrestling team.

Willamette had a women’s varsity rowing team which was disbanded in spring of 2016. This led to a lawsuit organized by twelve former athletes, Fawcett v. Willamette. Later settled in a TRO, it led to the addition of two women’s sports.

== Facilities ==
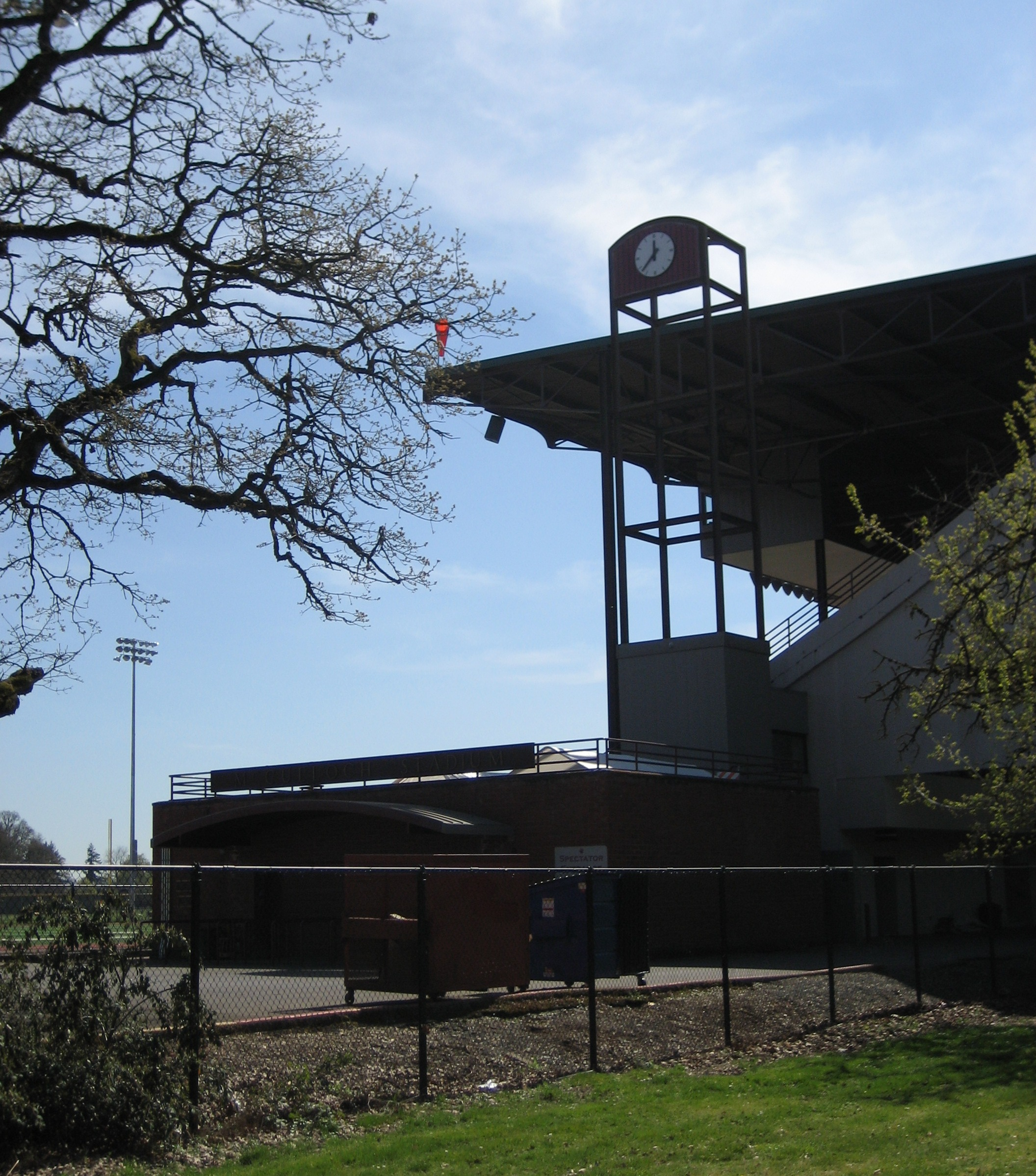
McCulloch Stadium, home to the football team

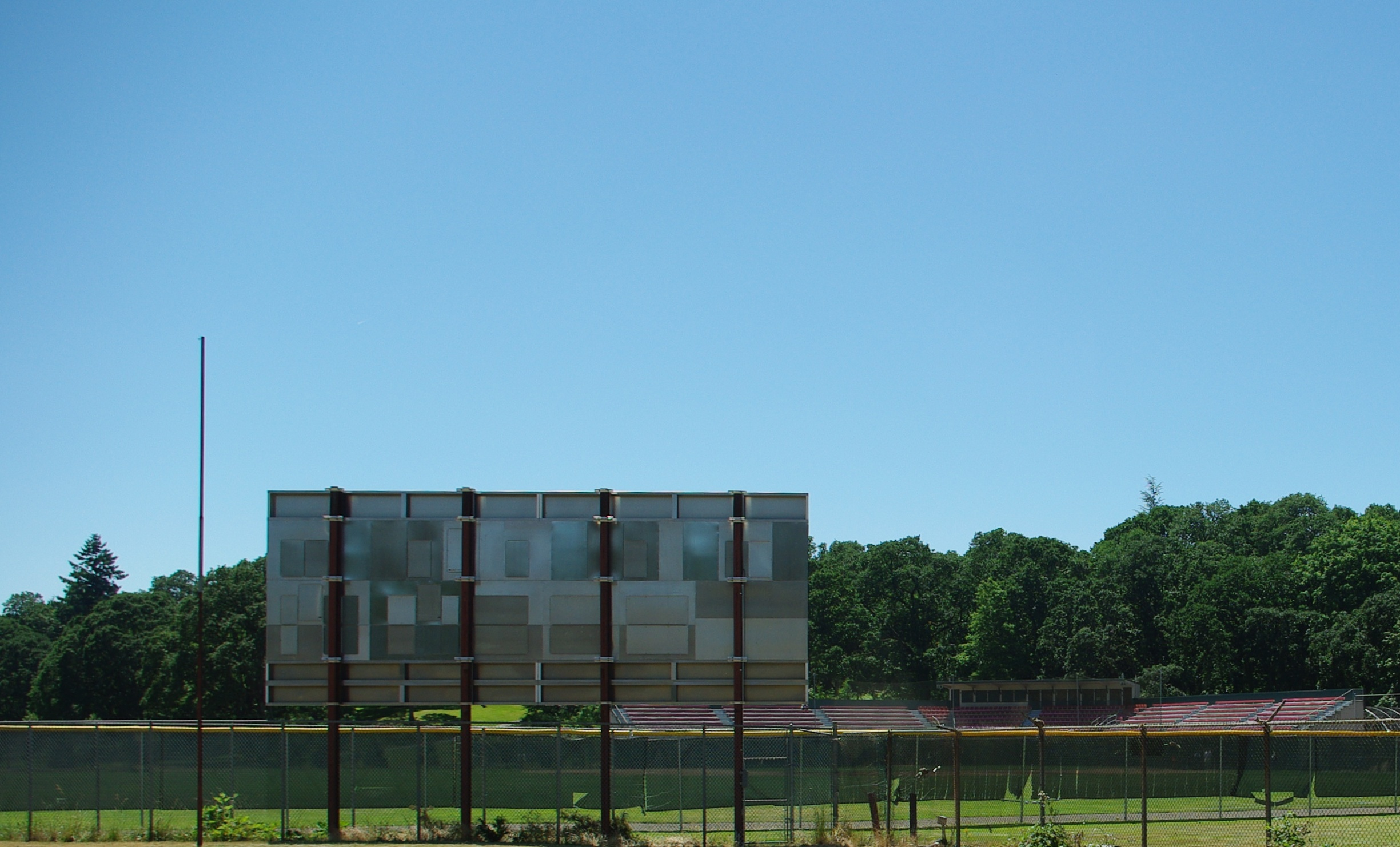
Spec Keene Stadium, baseball venue

Both the track and fields teams and the football team host home events at McCulloch Stadium. Built in 1950, it is two blocks south of the Willamette campus, with Salem Hospital in between. Next to the stadium is Roy S. "Spec" Keene Stadium, home of the baseball team. Completed in 1989, it includes batting cages. Both stadiums are next to Salem's Bush's Pasture Park used by the cross country teams for their annual home meet. The softball field is located south of the Tokyo International University of America campus on the east side of 13th Street.

The Lestle J. Sparks Center is the main indoor facility for the school, and contains Cone Field House and Henkle Gymnasium. Sparks was built in 1974 and expanded in 1995. Home basketball games are held in Cone Field House, with swimming meets and volleyball matches also held at Sparks. Sparks contains the offices for the athletic program as well as training facilities. Adjacent to the building on the south is the soccer field, with the main tennis courts nearby. The golf teams do not have practice facilities or venues on campus.

== Culture ==
The Bearcats official colors are cardinal and old gold. Willamette's original colors of cardinal red and gold were selected in 1895. Fight Bearcats Fight is the official fight song for the school, and Ode to Willamette is the university's Alma Mater. Blitz is the current mascot, who replaced Barney the Bearcat.

Willamette's official booster organization is the Willamette Bearcat Club. The Willamette Athletic Hall of Fame was started in 1991 with 16 inductees. As of 2008 the hall had inducted 67 former athletes, 9 coaches, 12 teams, and 10 others. Linfield University to the north in McMinnville is Willamette's main rival. The Bearcats began facing the Wildcats in football in 1902.

== Team national championships ==
- Men's basketball, 1993 NAIA Division II
- Men's team handball, 1974 & 1975 USA Team Handball College Nationals - Men's Division
