= Ford Hall (Willamette University) =

Building on the Willamette University campus in Salem, Oregon, U.S.

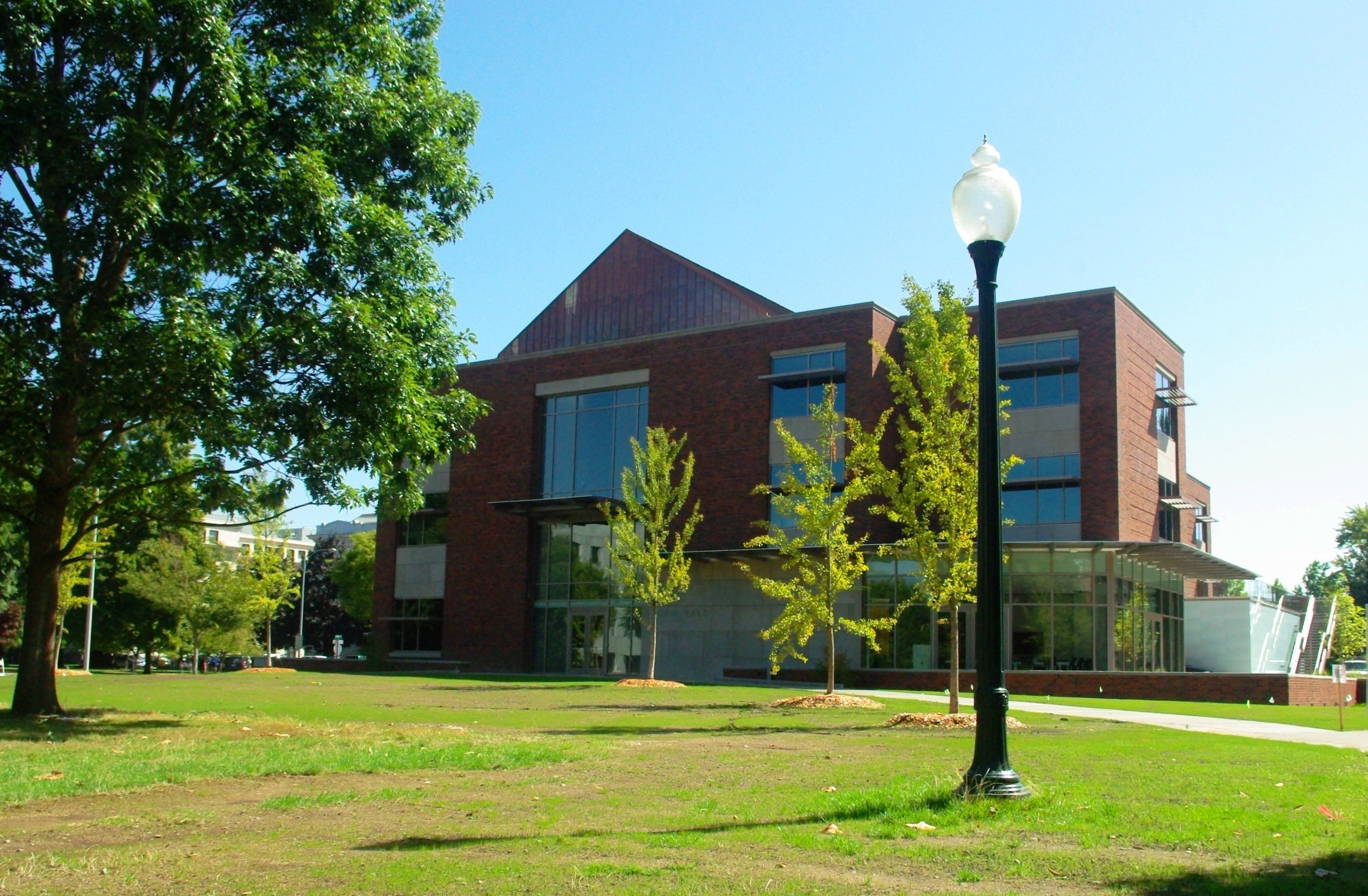
- West side of the building
- Interactive map of the Ford Hall area

General information
- Type: Academic
- Location: Salem, Oregon, United States
- Coordinates: 44.9370°N 123.0286°W
- Current tenants: Willamette University
- Construction started: 2008
- Completed: 2009
- Owner: Willamette University

Height
- Height: 4 stories

Technical details
- Floor count: 4

Design and construction
- Architect: Hennebery Eddy Architects
- Main contractor: Hoffman Construction

Ford Hall is a four-story academic hall at Willamette University in Salem in the U.S. state of Oregon. Completed in 2009, the building houses classrooms, offices, and laboratories from several disciplines of the school's College of Liberal Arts. The 42,000-square-foot (3,900 m^{2}) structure cost $16 million and earned Leadership in Energy and Environmental Design (LEED) Gold certification upon completion for environmentally friendly features and construction. Ford Hall is named in honor of Hallie Ford, who contributed $8 million towards construction of the building.

== History ==
Plans for a new academic building on the Willamette campus surfaced as early as January 2006 when the university hoped to build an $8 to $12 million facility. In October 2006, the university received an $8 million donation to go towards building a new academic hall on the campus. Anonymous at the time, the gift was the largest ever gift from a person to the school, and the second largest donation ever after an $11 million donation by Tokyo International University of America in 2003 to help build the Kaneko Commons. It was later revealed that Hallie Ford made the donation, and the building was subsequently named after her.

The new building was estimated to cost $16 million total to build and would be a 46,000-foot (14,000 m) structure designed to add 25 professors to the faculty and be used to house media studies, computer sciences, rhetoric, and mathematics. Expected to be finished by the new school year in 2009, the hall was to be built next to Gatke Hall on the northeast corner of the campus.

Work on the project began with the removal of trees from the site in December 2007. Some trees were moved, while other were planned to be re-used in the new building. Hennebery Eddy Architects were hired by Willamette in 2007 to design the new building, with Timothy R. Eddy as the principal architect. The school hired Hoffman Construction as the general contractor and hoped to achieve LEED Gold Certification for the building. Joshua Carlson was the landscape designer on the project.

While originally planned to be 46,000 square feet (4,300 m^{2}), by the time construction began the final design called for 45,000 square feet (4,200 m^{2}) of space in Ford Hall. During construction, the Pacific Northwest Regional Council of Carpenters picketed the school in a dispute with one of the subcontractors working on Ford Hall. The sustainability aspects of the building helped Willamette land on the Sierra Club’s Cool Schools list in 2009, as Ford Hall was anticipated to earn a LEED Gold rating, which was earned later that year. Ford Hall also earned recognition in the 2030 Challenge Award as a runner-up for the as built category.

== Details ==
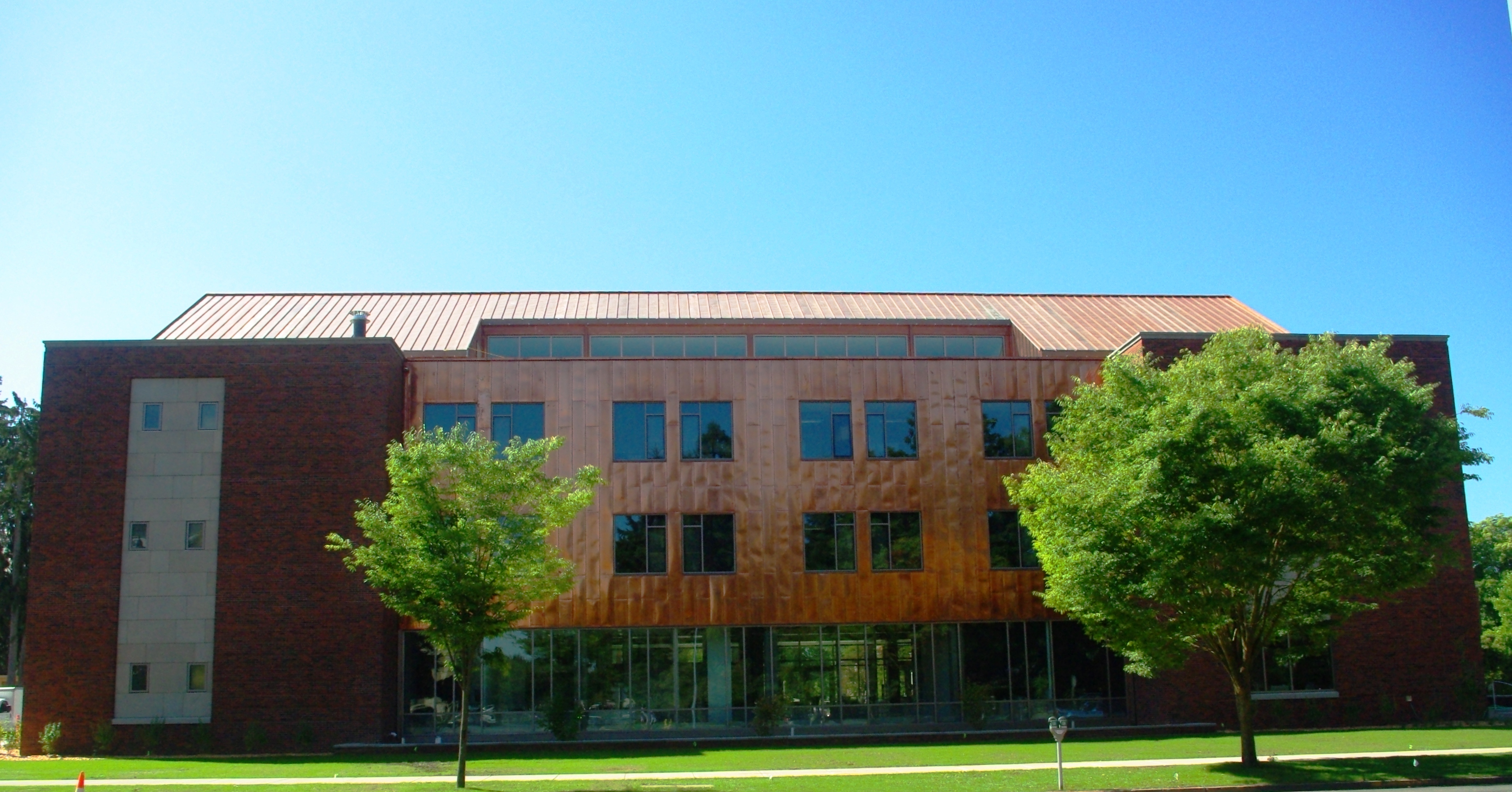
North side of Ford Hall

Designed by Hennebery Eddy Architects, the structure is adjacent to Gatke Hall and across state street from the Oregon State Capitol. Ford was the first new academic hall on campus since 1996 when the Olin Science Center was completed. School officials hoped to use the project to draw more students to that section of the campus, which was previously underutilized, as well as to incorporate many environmentally friendly features into the new building.

These green amenities included using brick, copper, stone, and other building materials that have a long lifespan. Brick is used for the exterior and copper for the roof. Other items include a displacement ventilation HVAC system, solar panels, use of recycled materials in the construction, and maximizing the use of natural light throughout the structure. Overall, the energy consumption is 58 percent less than for a similar building built to code. LEED Gold status was awarded on December 10, 2009, by the U.S. Green Building Council.

Ford Hall houses a mixture of programs from across departments within the college of liberal arts. The four-story, 42,000-square-foot (3,900 m^{2}) brick-faced building houses programs from rhetoric, computer science, film studies, mathematics, and digital art, among others. This includes recording studios, a film viewing room, and a space for performances in the below-ground level. The first floor of the three above-ground levels includes an art studio and art gallery, while the other two floors contain laboratories, classrooms, and offices for staff. These upper floors also contain what the school labels as hearths, in which each department in the building has one, and which they are designed to encourage collaboration between students as well as between the faculty and students.
