= Lausanne Hall =

Building on the Willamette University campus in Salem, Oregon, U.S.

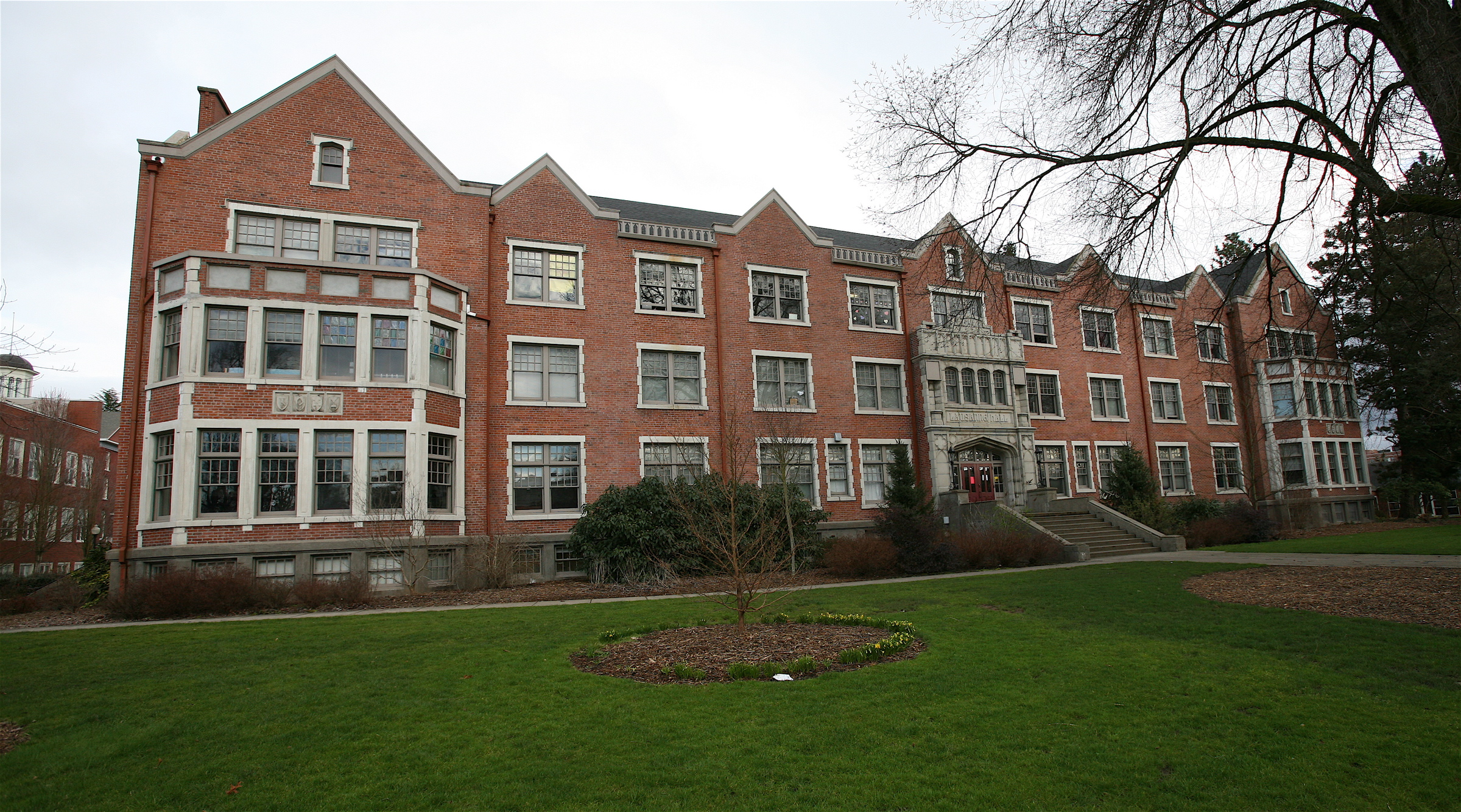
- West side of the hall
- Interactive map of the Lausanne Hall area

General information
- Type: Dormitory
- Architectural style: Late Gothic Revival
- Location: Salem, Oregon, United States
- Coordinates: 44.936879°N 123.032509°W
- Current tenants: Residential Services
- Construction started: 1919
- Completed: 1920
- Owner: Willamette University

Height
- Height: 3 stories

Technical details
- Floor count: 4

Design and construction
- Architect: Fred A. Legge

Lausanne Hall is a college residence hall at Willamette University in Salem, Oregon, United States. Built in 1920, the red-brick and stone-accented structure stands three stories tall along Winter Street on the western edge of the campus that was originally a residence for women only. The late Gothic Revival style building replaced a home that had also been used as a dormitory. This structure was moved to campus and originally was named as the Women's College before assuming the name of Lausanne.

Designed by Fred A. Legge, the new hall is the oldest residence hall at Willamette and can house up to 152 students. This new structure was remodeled in the 1980s and had a minor fire in 2002. The hall is named after a ship that brought reinforcements in 1840 to the Methodist Mission, whose members founded the university in 1842.

== History ==
Willamette University's president Thomas Van Scoy purchased the building in 1880 to serve as the school's Women's College. The building purchased was a house that had belonged to the school's first teacher, Chloe Clark Willson. The building was modified and moved from the corner of Capital and Court streets to the north of campus to the western edge of the school from 1880 to 1881. The modifications included adding a mansard roof and another floor to the top in addition to a new wing on the backside. Once it was moved to campus a tower was added to the old home and another floor added to the bottom.

Originally named as Young Women's Hall, it was renamed for the ship Lausanne that brought additional missionaries and workers to the Methodist Mission in 1839. Many of these missionaries helped establish the Oregon Institute in 1842, the predecessor to Willamette. By 1909 the old building was valued to be worth $5,000. This old building became a fire hazard and was closed in 1915. In 1919, it was demolished to make way for a modern structure.

A new Lausanne Hall was authorized by the Board of Trustees at the university and construction began in November 1919, with $40,000 raised to cover the costs of construction. Initial estimates placed the cost at $80,000 for a three-story brick building that included a basement with a capacity of 125 residents. A campaign by the university was launched in 1920 to raise $100,000 to be used for completing the new Lausanne Hall, the reconstruction of Waller Hall that burned in December 1919, and adding a central heating plant to the school. By December 1919, excavation of the site was completed and the laying of the concrete foundation had begun. The new residence was completed by November 1920 at a cost of $140,000, and included a three-room infirmary on the first floor.

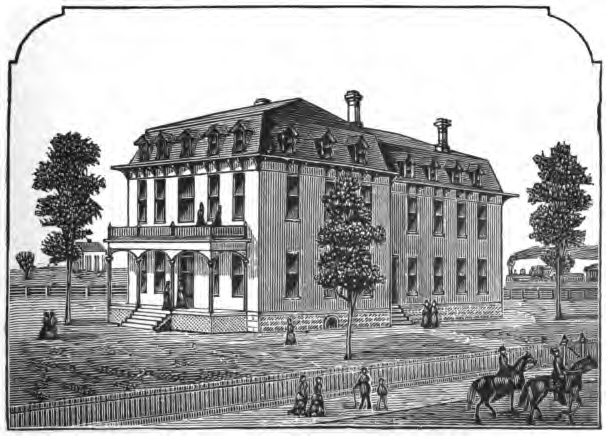
Original hall in 1884

In 1921, the Lausanne Guild was formed by city residents to furnish and landscape the new building. The organization changed their name to Town and Gown in 1925 and continues to promote connections between Salem and the school. Informal dancing at the dorm was banned in 1922 the hall's board of directors after the all-female residents had been dancing with each other. The concern was peer pressure would cause some girls to dance who otherwise would not dance.

During World War II the dormitory was the home of the United States Navy's College Navy Training Program at Willamette. The program was at Lausanne from July 1943 to November 1945. The rear of the building used to overlook the school's football field, Sweetland Field, until Doney Hall was built in the 1950s.

The structure was submitted to be listed on the National Register of Historic Places in 1983. Nominated by the student government, it was believed to be the oldest dormitory west of the Mississippi River, but the hall was not added to the list. During the summer break in 1985 the building was extensively remodeled at a cost of $900,000. At the time of the remodel, the interior was still in its original state. Work included new carpeting, painting, a new sprinkler and fire system, new windows, new wiring, and restoration of the central staircase among other work. Prior to the remodel, about 50 residents protested in a march to the university president's office over complaints regarding the decision process.

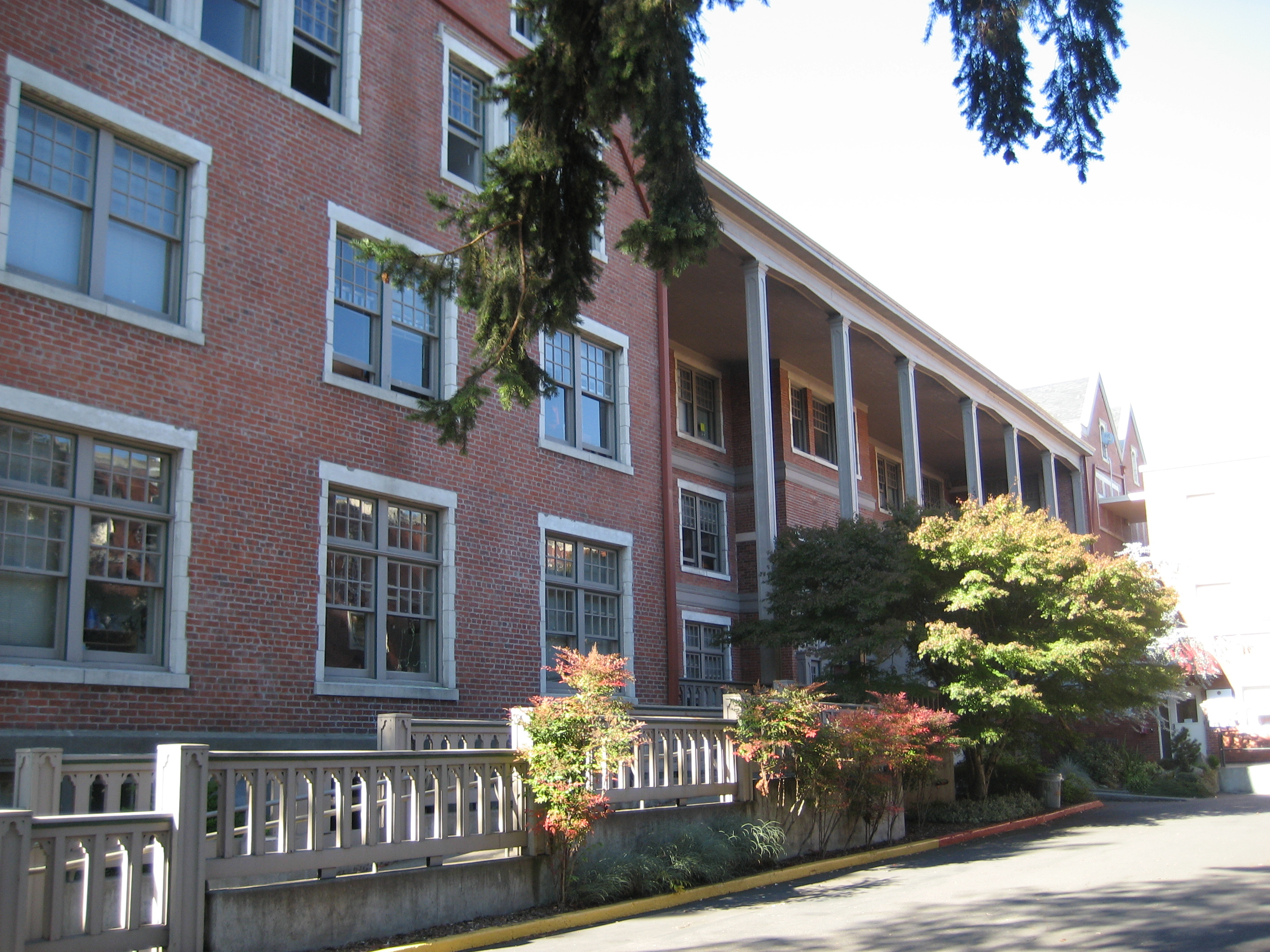
Back porch area

In September 2002, a fire on the third floor caused about $125,000 in damage to the building. Caused by an unattended candle, the fire was contained to one room and was under control within 30 minutes. In September 2003, the building was evacuated due to a suspicious package found at neighboring Doney Hall that turned out to be a false alarm.

== Amenities ==
Lausanne was designed by architect Fred A. Legge, a Willamette alumnus, in the Late Gothic Revival style. The eastern side of the hall are two floors of covered porches. Lausanne has a concrete foundation and composite shingle roofing. The exterior of the three-story tall structure is constructed of red brick and stone. The hall is the oldest residence hall at Willamette.

Housing up to 152 people, the hall includes a kitchen, a lounge, and common areas that have a piano and pool table. The individual rooms for residents are large and many have tall ceilings. Due to these amenities, the hall is one of the more requested dorms at the university.
