= Eaton Hall (Oregon) =

Building on the Willamette University campus in Salem, Oregon, U.S.

Coordinates: 44.937099°N 123.030224°W

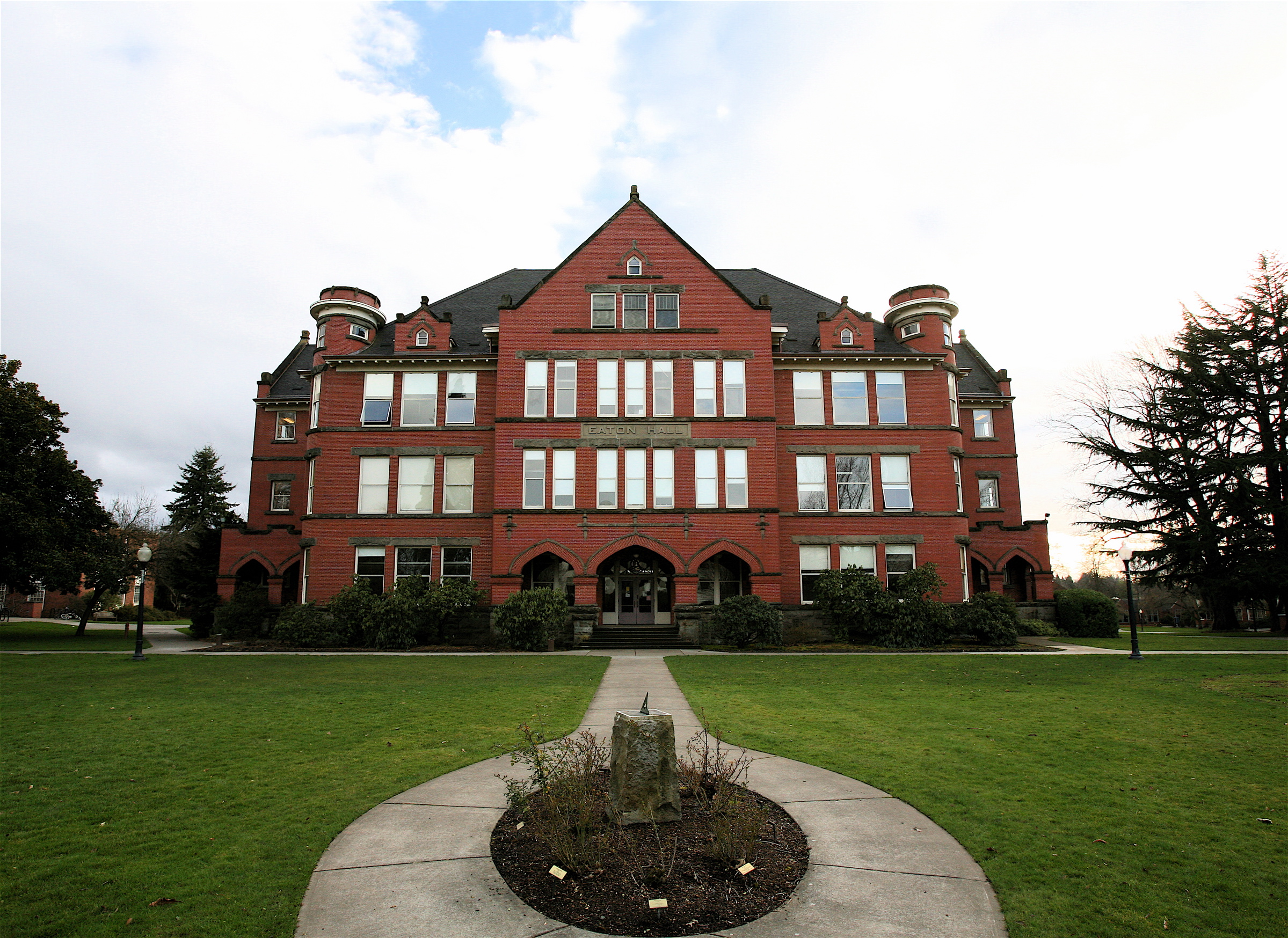
- The north side of Eaton Hall
- Interactive map of the Eaton Hall area

General information
- Type: College
- Architectural style: Late Gothic Revival
- Location: Salem, Oregon; United States
- Construction started: 1907
- Completed: 1908

Technical details
- Floor count: 4

Design and construction
- Architect: John E. Tourtellotte

Eaton Hall is an academic building on the campus of Willamette University in Salem, Oregon, United States. Completed in 1909, the four-story brick and stone hall is the fourth oldest building on the campus of the school after Waller Hall (1867), Gatke Hall (1903), and the Art Building (1907). Eaton is a mix of architectural styles and houses the humanities departments of the liberal arts college.

== History ==
Eaton Hall was built from 1907 to 1908. The primarily Late Gothic Revival style building was dedicated on September 21, 1909, and named in honor of Abel E. Eaton. Eaton donated $50,000 for the construction of the hall. He owned the Union Woolen Mills in Eastern Oregon.

Originally constructed with round spires on the turrets, these were later removed. Eaton Hall was home to Willamette’s law school from 1923 until 1938. During the 1960s the structure housed the school’s office of the president, the registrar, the school’s telephone switchboard, and business offices.

Willamette's administrative offices were located in Eaton from its opening until 1980. In 1980, renovations began to convert administrative offices into classrooms and faculty offices and other modern improvements. In 1983, the building's interior was remodeled, and the following year Eaton was added to Salem's Historic Properties List. In the spring of 2004, a $1.4 million renovation of the building’s fourth floor was completed. The former attic space was converted into offices and classrooms for the rhetoric and anthropology departments.

== Details ==
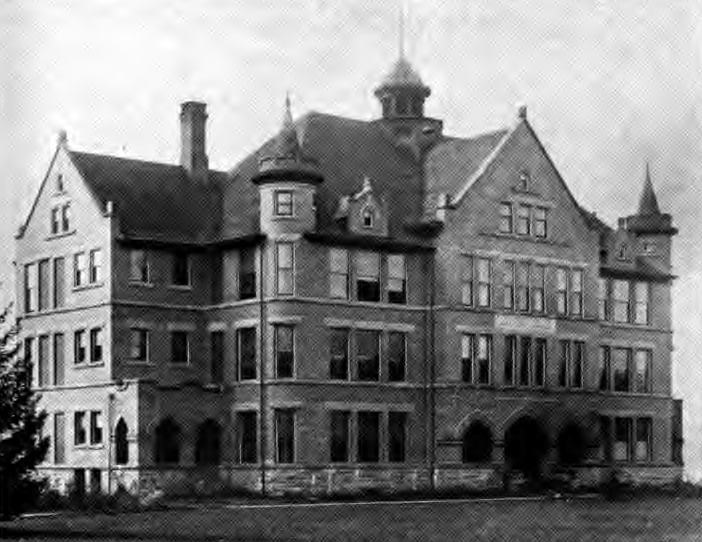
Eaton Hall circa 1920

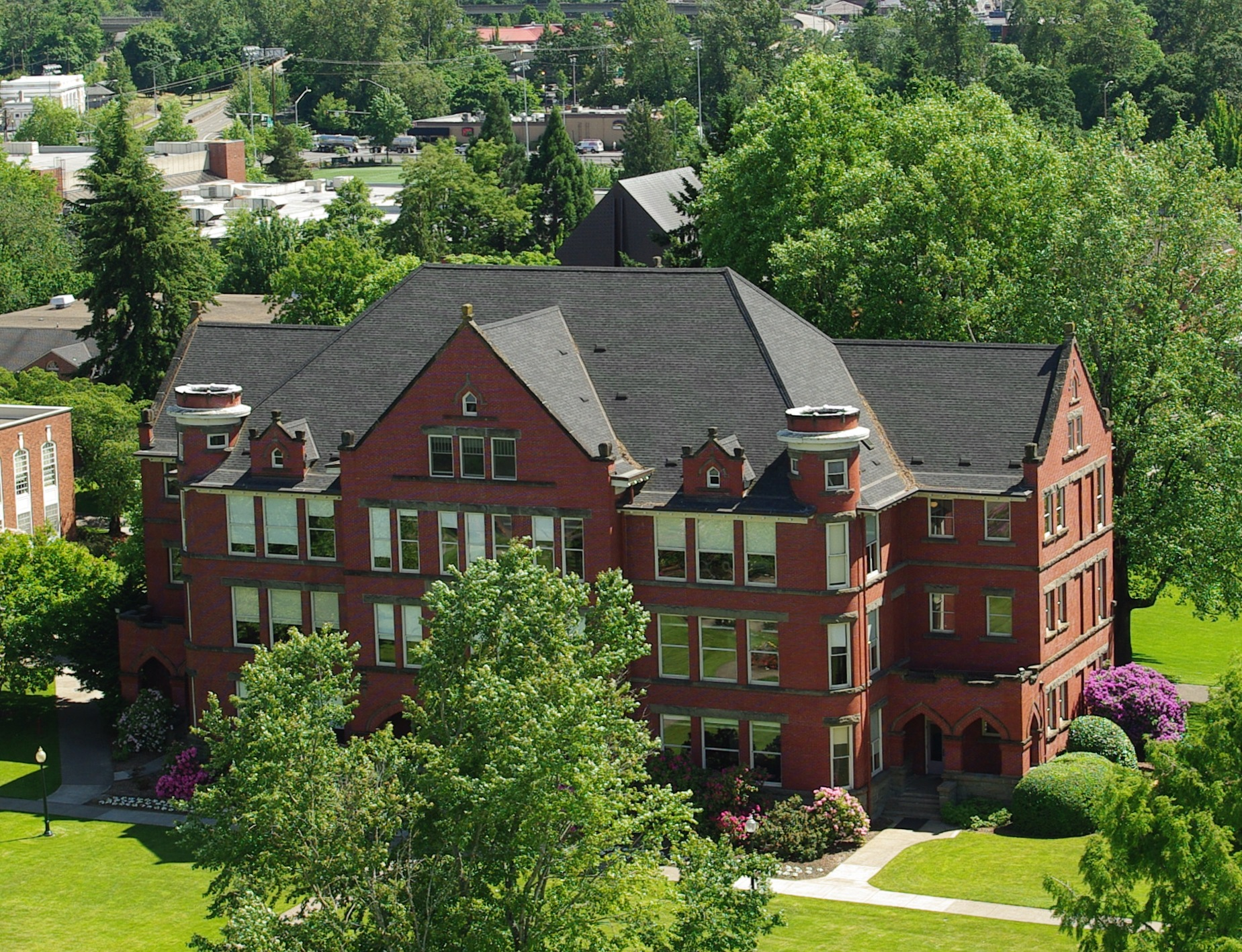
Eaton from the Oregon State Capital

Four stories tall, the hall is constructed of stone and bricks with a composite shingle roof. Architectural details contain elements of Victorian, Gothic Revival, and Beaux-Arts styles. Gothic elements include a pointed arches on the entrances, embedded towers or turrets, a foundation of rusticated stone, and decorative stone lintels.

Located on the north end of campus, it is adjacent to Waller Hall to the west and Smullin Hall to the east. To the south is an open field which previously served as the school's football field. The building currently houses Willamette’s humanities programs. This includes the Anthropology, Religion, English, History, Classics, and Philosophy departments.
