= Art Building (Willamette University) =

Building on the Willamette University campus in Salem, Oregon, U.S.

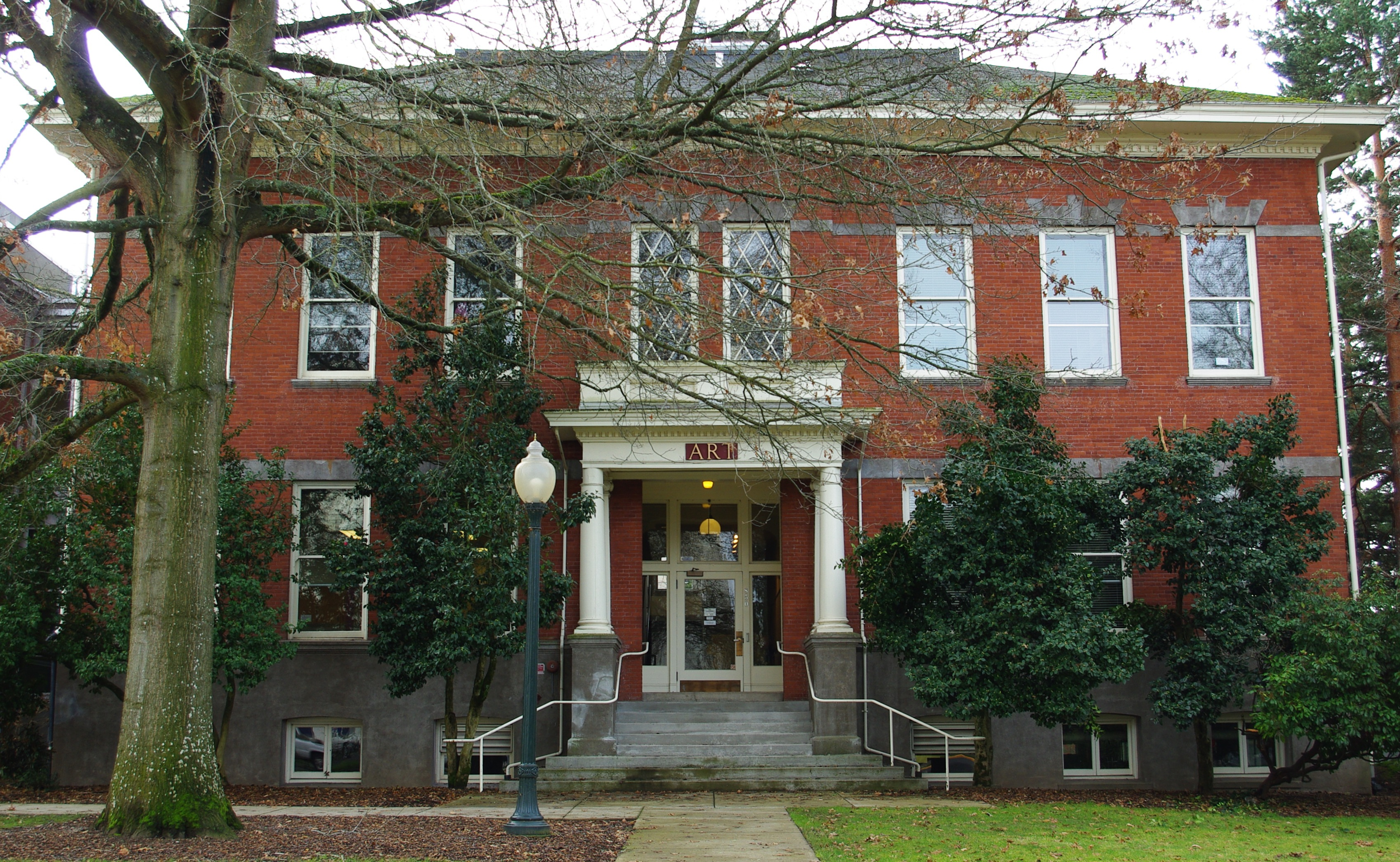
- Front entrance
- Interactive map of the Art Building area
- Former names: Science Building

General information
- Architectural style: Beaux Arts
- Location: Salem, Oregon, USA
- Coordinates: 44.937881°N 123.032026°W
- Current tenants: Art Department
- Completed: 1905
- Owner: Willamette University

Technical details
- Floor count: 3
- Floor area: 14,000 square feet (1,300 m^{2})

The Art Building is an academic hall at Willamette University in Salem, Oregon, United States. Built in 1905 for the Willamette University College of Medicine, it is the third oldest building on campus after Waller Hall and Gatke Hall. The Beaux-Arts style red-brick building stands three stories tall and contains 14,000 square feet (1,300 m^{2}) of space.

== History ==
In 1905, Willamette University opened the Medical Building as the first permanent home for the College of Medicine. The medical school, the first in the Northwest, merged with the University of Oregon's medical school (now Oregon Health & Science University) in Portland in 1913 and vacated the building. That year the law school moved into the now Science Hall, which was the first regular home to the school on campus. Willamette's high school department, Willamette Academy, was also located in the building from 1913 until 1920. The science department also occupied the building at this time.

In 1938, the law school moved to Gatke Hall (built in 1903 and moved to campus in 1938), and in 1941 the science department moved to neighboring Collins Hall. In 1941, the then College of Music moved into the building, remaining until 1976. That year the building finished renovations begun the previous year after the structure had declined to the point where the top floor was declared unsafe by the fire marshal. The remodel prepared the building for use by the art department, who moved there in 1976 with the building renamed as the Art Building. After the art department relocated to the hall, a gallery for the school's art collection developed on the top floor and was named the Hallie Brown Ford Gallery. The collections were moved in 1998 to the new Hallie Ford Museum of Art located one block to the west.

In 2002, a wing was added and the existing structure was extensively remodeled and upgraded in a $3.5 million project. The three-story and 7,000-square-foot (650 m^{2}) wing was added to the east with covered walkways connecting it to the existing structure on each of the three floors. Renovations on the original building included seismic retrofitting, addition of bathrooms, and reconfiguration of the basement and the top floor. Jon Weiner of Soderstrom Architects designed the new brick-faced wing, while Walsh Construction served as the general contractor.

== Details ==
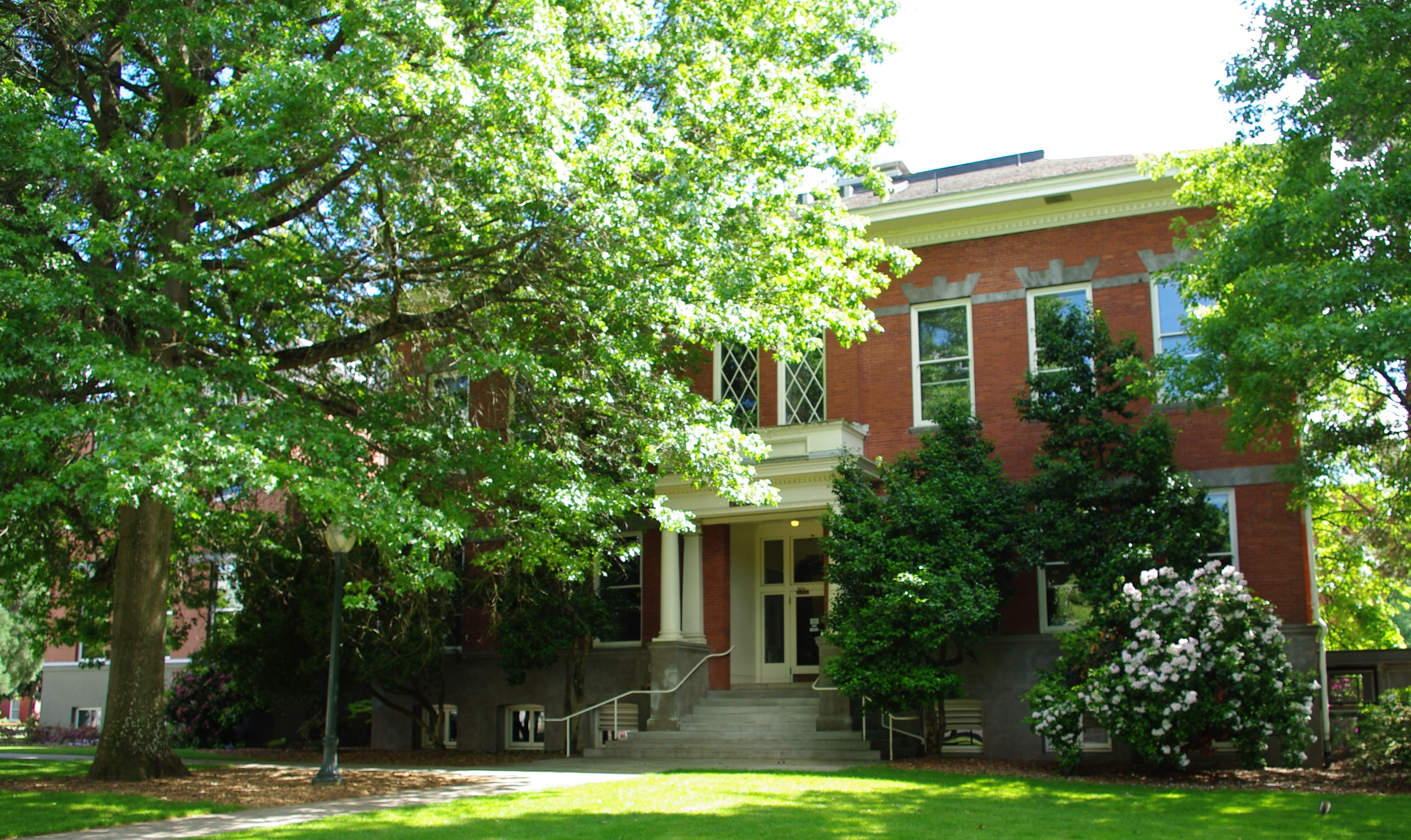
Front in summertime

The original building contains 14,000 square feet (1,300 m^{2}) spread over three stories and a full basement. It is the oldest building at Willamette after Gatke and Waller halls, though Gatke was built elsewhere and moved to campus in 1938. Originally featuring wood floors, the now carpeted hall includes a ceramics studio in the basement attached to an outdoor kiln, teaching studios, galleries, offices, and work rooms. The Beaux Arts style brick building is at the corner of State and Winter streets on the north end of the campus across from the Oregon Civic Justice Center. The hall has a concrete foundation faced with bricks with the roof made of composite shingles. The new wing includes a gallery for the display of student art, a 35-seat classroom, offices, painting and printmaking studios, and storage areas. The art history and art departments both occupy the buildings.
