= Gatke Hall =

Building on the Willamette University campus in Salem, Oregon, U.S.

Coordinates: 44.936955°N 123.027885°W

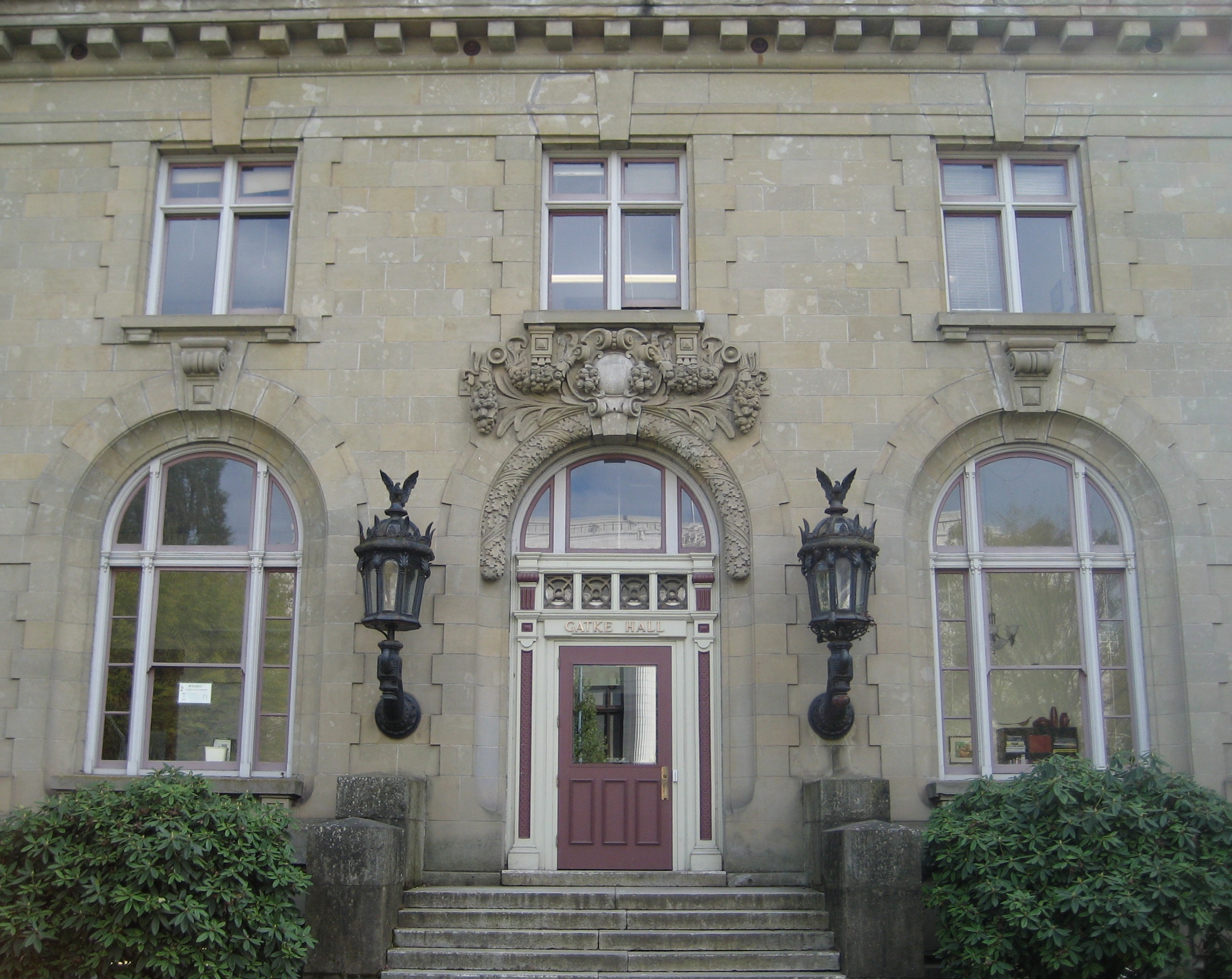
- The entrance to Gatke Hall
- Interactive map of the Gatke Hall area

General information
- Architectural style: Beaux Arts
- Location: Salem, Oregon, United States
- Construction started: 1901
- Completed: 1903
- Client: United States Postal Service

Design and construction
- Architect: James Knox Taylor

Gatke Hall is the second-oldest building at Willamette University in Salem, Oregon, United States. A two-story structure, it was originally built in downtown Salem in 1903 across the street from the Marion County Courthouse and served as a post office. The Beaux Arts styled building was moved to the university in 1938 and first served as the home to the law school.

== History ==
In 1901, construction began on the first post office building in Salem. The Beaux Arts style structure was designed by architect James Knox Taylor. Prior postal locations were housed in privately owned buildings. The new two-story structure was erected between the Marion County Courthouse and the Oregon State Capitol. It had a steel and brick frame with a sandstone exterior. The sandstone came from Ashland, Oregon, along with the granite used in the building, while the wood and bricks used came from Salem. On April 1, 1903, the building opened and remained as the city's post office until a new federal building (currently the State Executive Office Building) opened on October 16, 1937.

In 1938, the building was moved to its present location at 12th and State Streets on Willamette University's campus. The building was moved intact on rollers down State Street in a process that took six months. Once on campus the structure served as home to Willamette’s law school. Gatke was placed at the same location as the original campus building built in the 1840s. That three-story building originally housed the Oregon Institute, but burned down in 1871. In 1939, the College of Law moved into its new home.

Then in 1952 the building received the Lady Justice statue that had adorned the Marion County Courthouse. Gatke housed the College of Law until 1967 when it relocated across campus to its current home in the Truman Wesley Collins Legal Center. With the move, the law school also took a portion of the ornate grillwork that had been custom made for the school. In 1967, Willamette's political science department took over the building and remained there until 1986.

In 1984, the building was added to the City of Salem’s list of historic properties as the second oldest building on campus after Waller Hall. In 1986, the political science department moved out and the facility was converted into administrative offices with the basement converted to a sculpture studio around 1990. In February 2007, 20-year-old Christopher Curry leaped out of a second story window of the building while trying to elude police. He was apprehended in a nearby building and arrested by Oregon State Police.

== Details ==
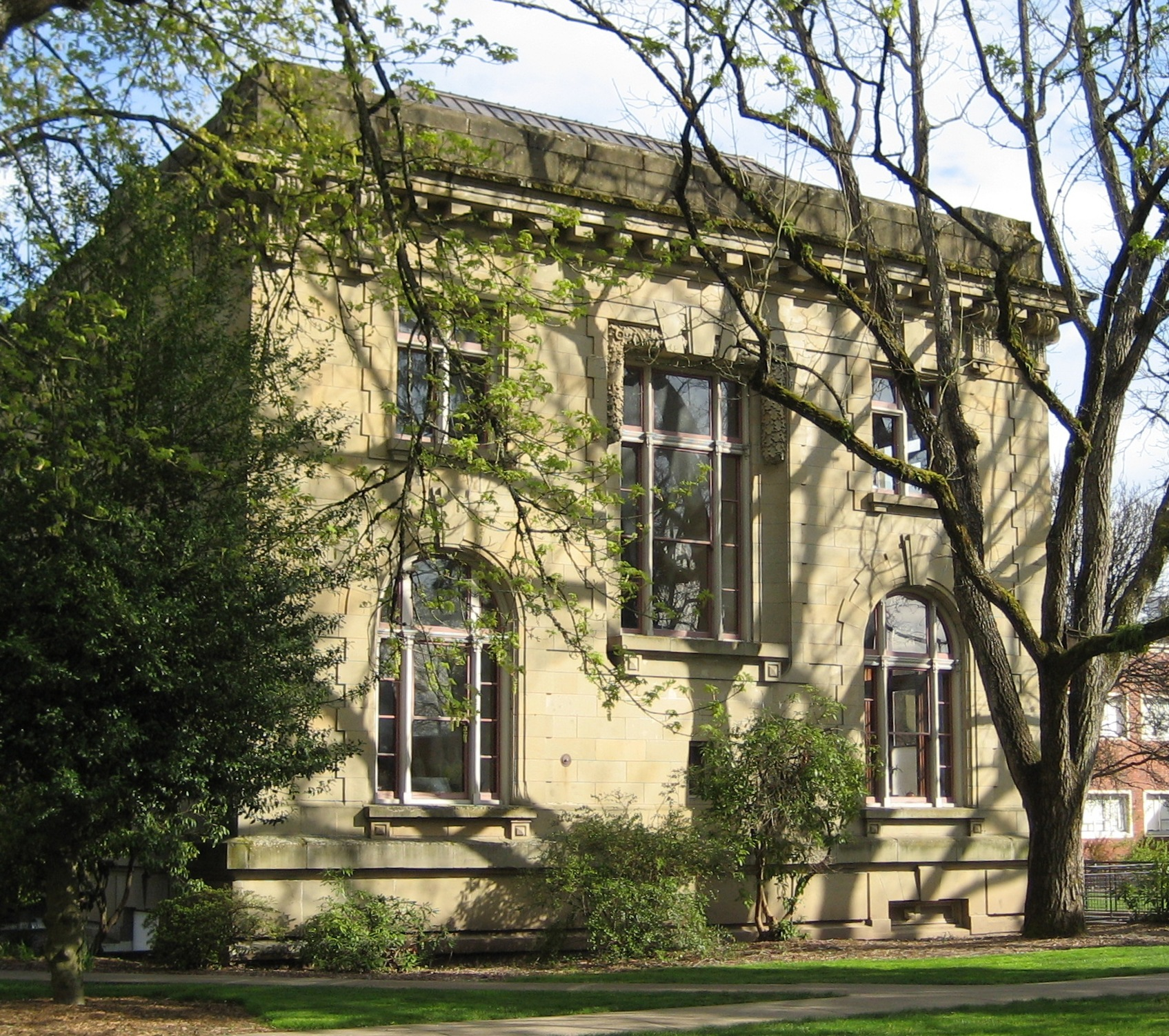
West side

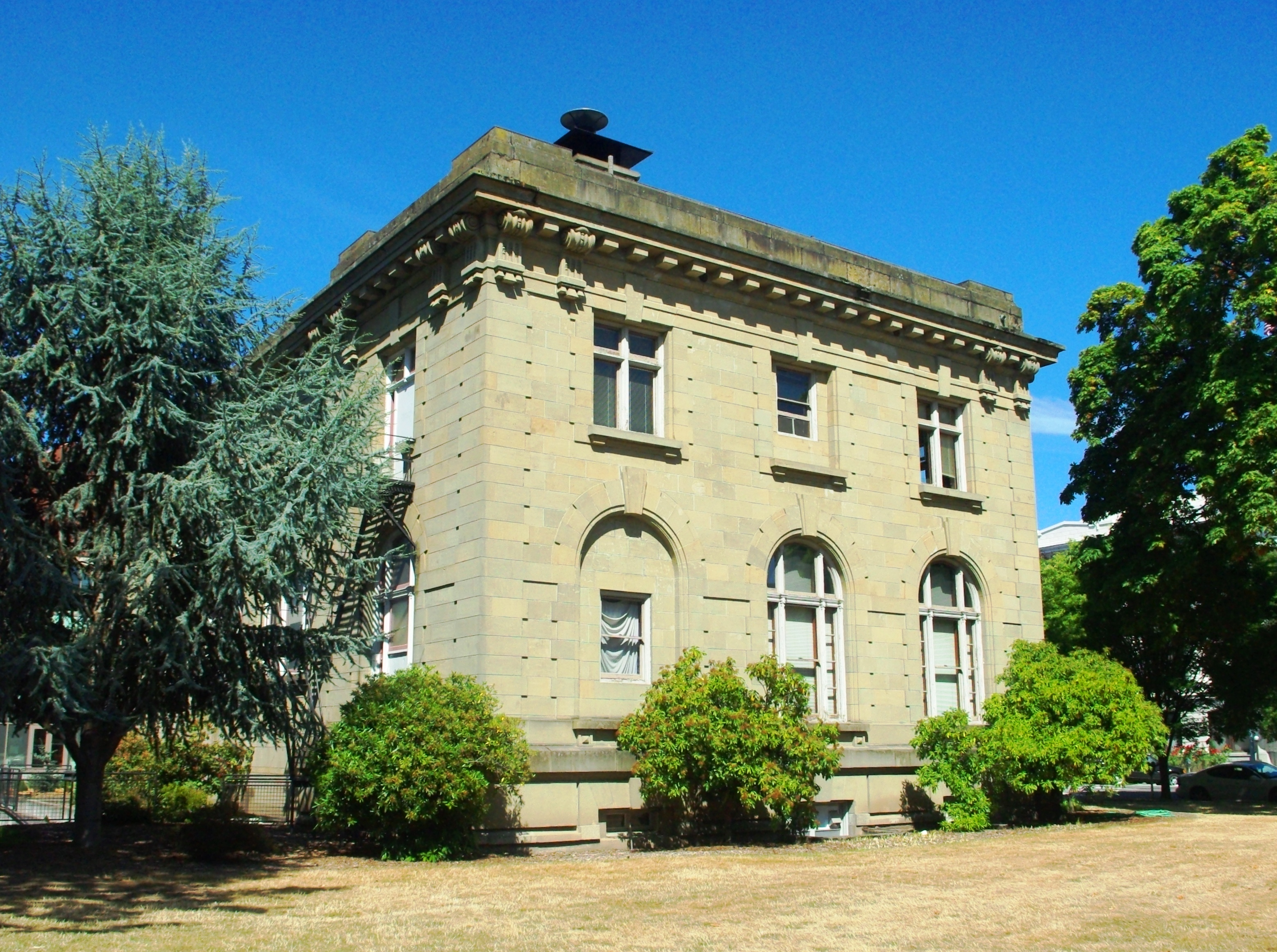
East side

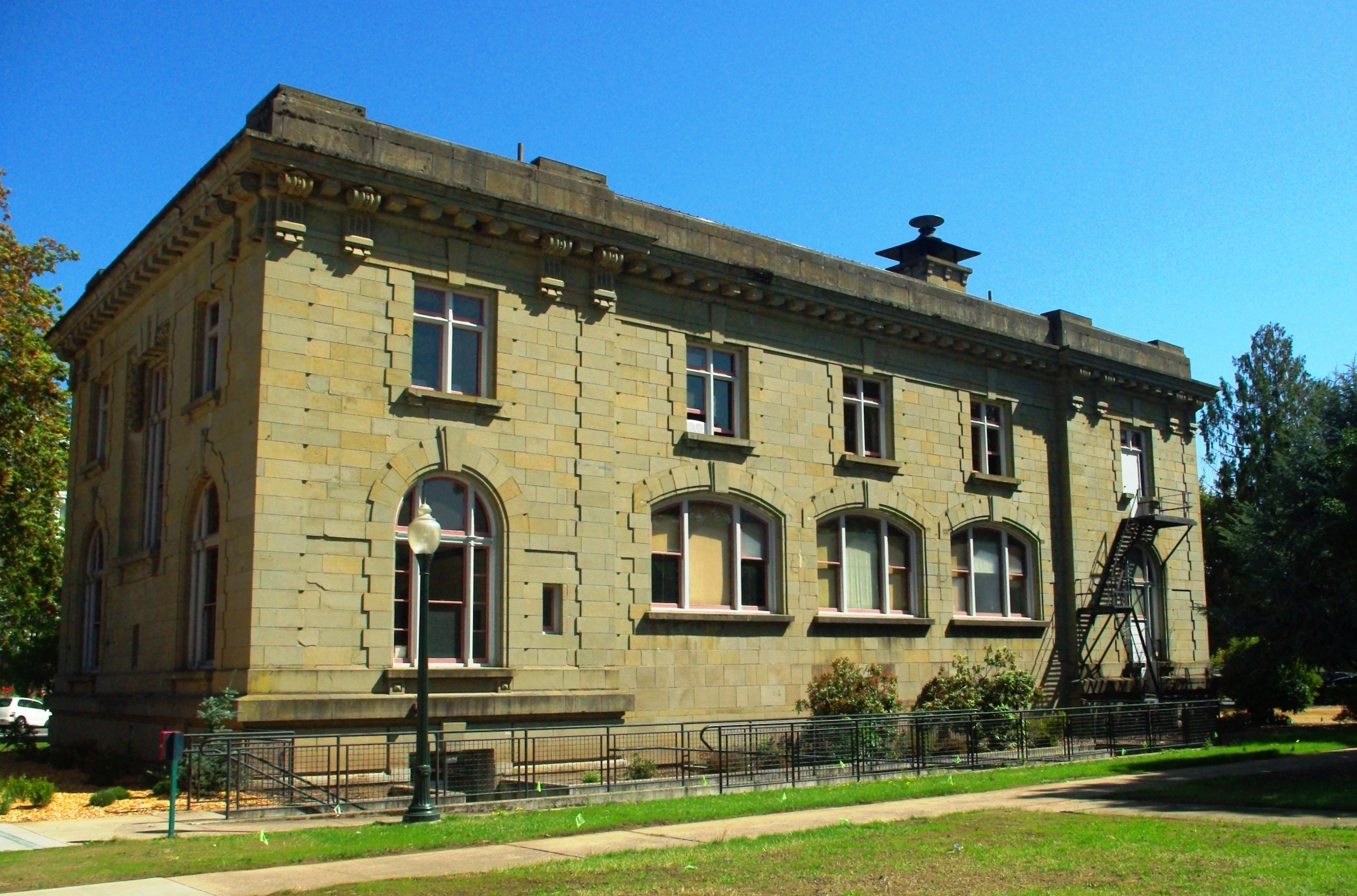
South side (back)

The building sits on the northeast section of the school's campus at the corner of 12th and State streets, with the Oregon Supreme Court Building directly across State Street to the north. The hall is named after former political science professor Robert Moulton Gatke. Gatke was the school’s first professor in that field and taught for 53 years at the institution. The exterior of the building is constructed with sandstone and has a metal roof. Beaux-Arts style in design, the structure also has Italian palazzo elements in its architecture. Inside, Gatke features the original marble floor and intricate woodwork. The building currently is home to an integrated lab of the exercise science department, a faculty research office, and some offices of the university’s IT department.
