= Waller Hall =

Building on the Willamette University campus in Salem, Oregon, U.S.

- Waller Hall, Willamette University
- U.S. National Register of Historic Places
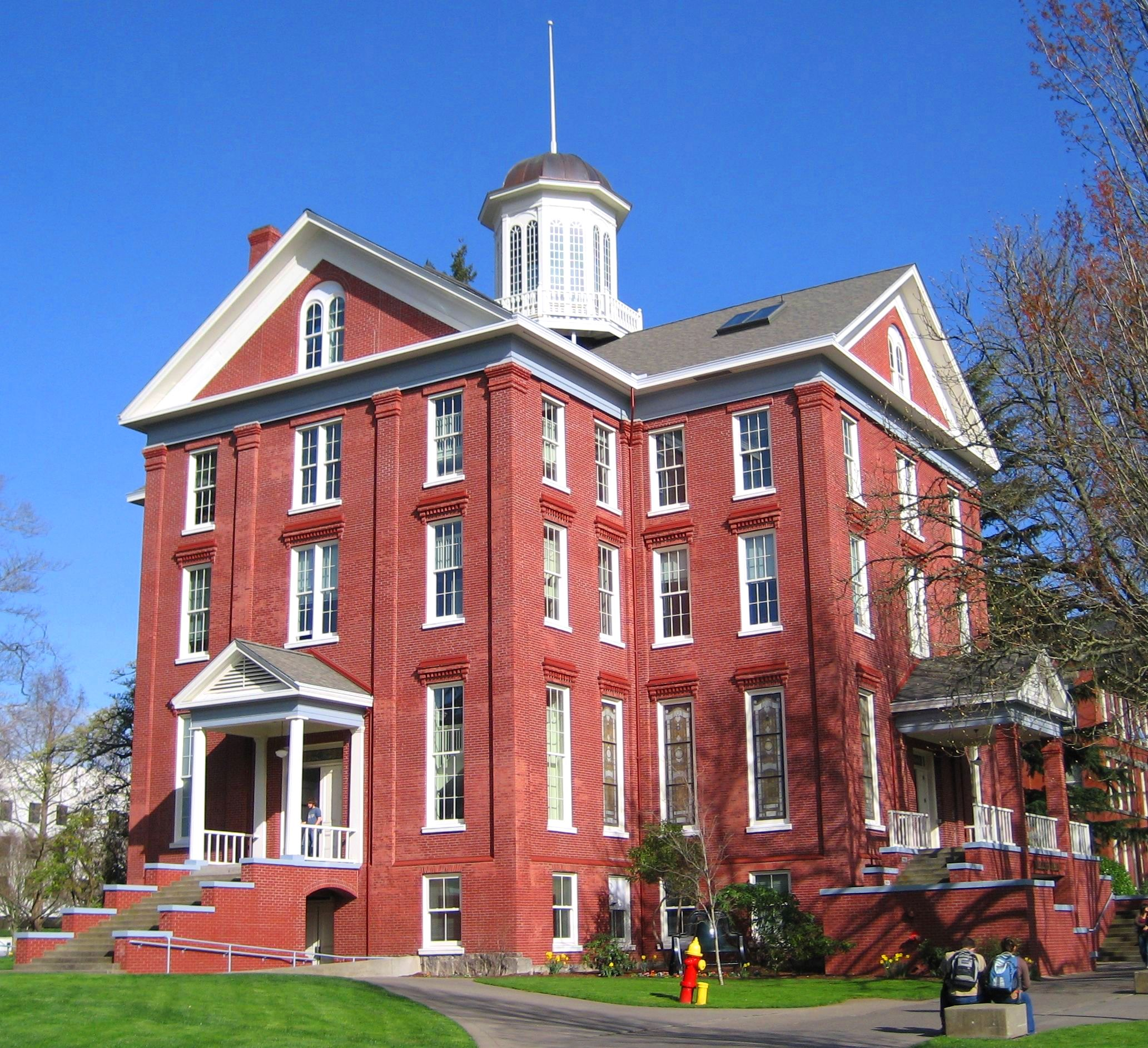
- Waller Hall in the springtime

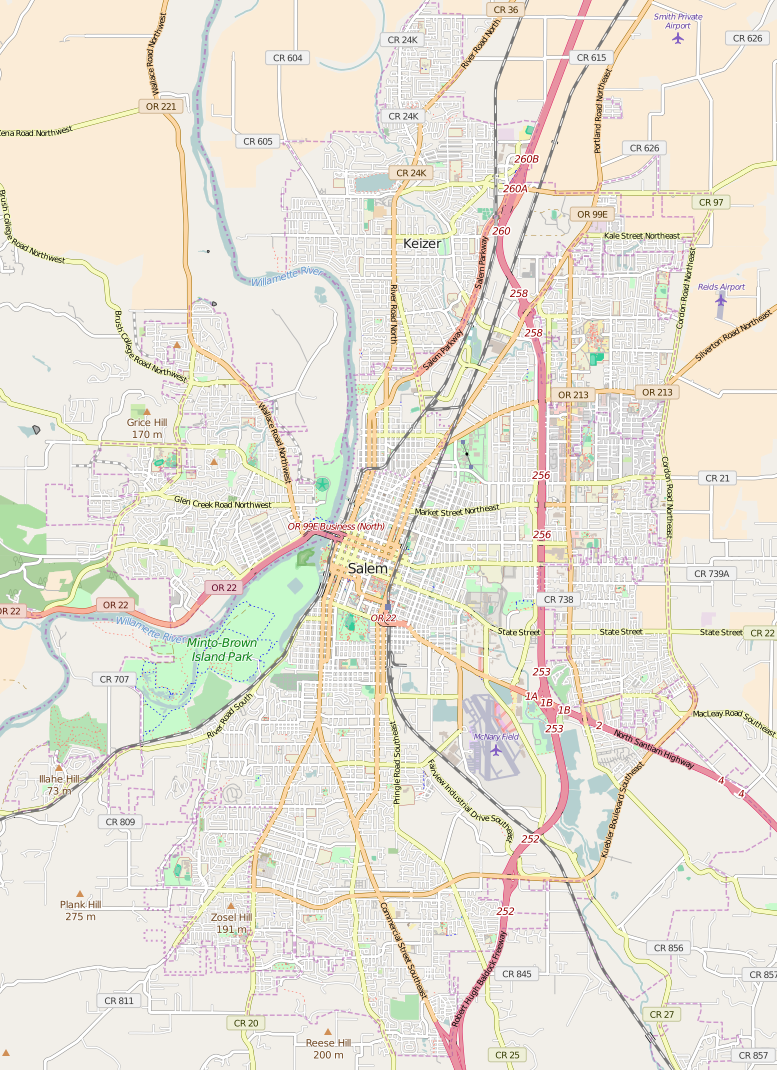
- Location within Salem OR Location within Oregon
- Location: Salem, Oregon
- Coordinates: 44°56′14″N 123°01′52″W
- Built: 1864–1867
- Architectural style: Renaissance
- NRHP reference No.: 75001593
- Added to NRHP: November 20, 1975

Waller Hall is a building on the campus of Willamette University in Salem, Oregon, in the United States. Opened in 1867 as University Hall, it is the oldest higher-education building west of the Mississippi River still in use, currently housing the university's administrative offices.

Built in the Renaissance style of architecture, it was added to the National Register of Historic Places in 1975. The building has been gutted twice by fires with the interior rebuilt each time, and went through renovations in 1987 to 1989 and again in 2005.

== History ==
=== Background ===
Due to a variety of factors, including the deterioration of the main campus building dating from 1844 and the need for additional space, the university considered building a new building designed specifically for the university beginning in the 1850s. Then on October 3, 1860, the board of trustees for the school resolved to begin the process of building a new primary hall to be used by the university. Reverend Alvin F. Waller was placed in charge of the efforts to raise the funds needed for a building. However, this was unsuccessful and on November 19, 1862, the board again passed a resolution calling for a new structure and forming a committee of Waller, Gustavus Hines, Josiah Lamberson Parrish, J. Lamson, and John H. Moores to prepare plans.

On December 2, the trustees authorized subscriptions to be solicited and paid to Waller with a goal of $20,000. On May 20, 1863, the board met again and learned that $12,800 had been pledged and the board then set up a building committee of Waller, Hines, Moores, E.N. Cook, and Thomas Milton Gatch. It was mainly through the efforts of the Reverend Waller that the hall was built. Several designs were then considered for the new building, and on February 22, 1864, by a vote of 16 to 1 the board selected the final plan that called for a brick building with a stone foundation. The foundation was to rise to a level 3 feet (0.91 m) above the ground to prevent moisture from the ground seeping into the bricks.

=== Construction ===
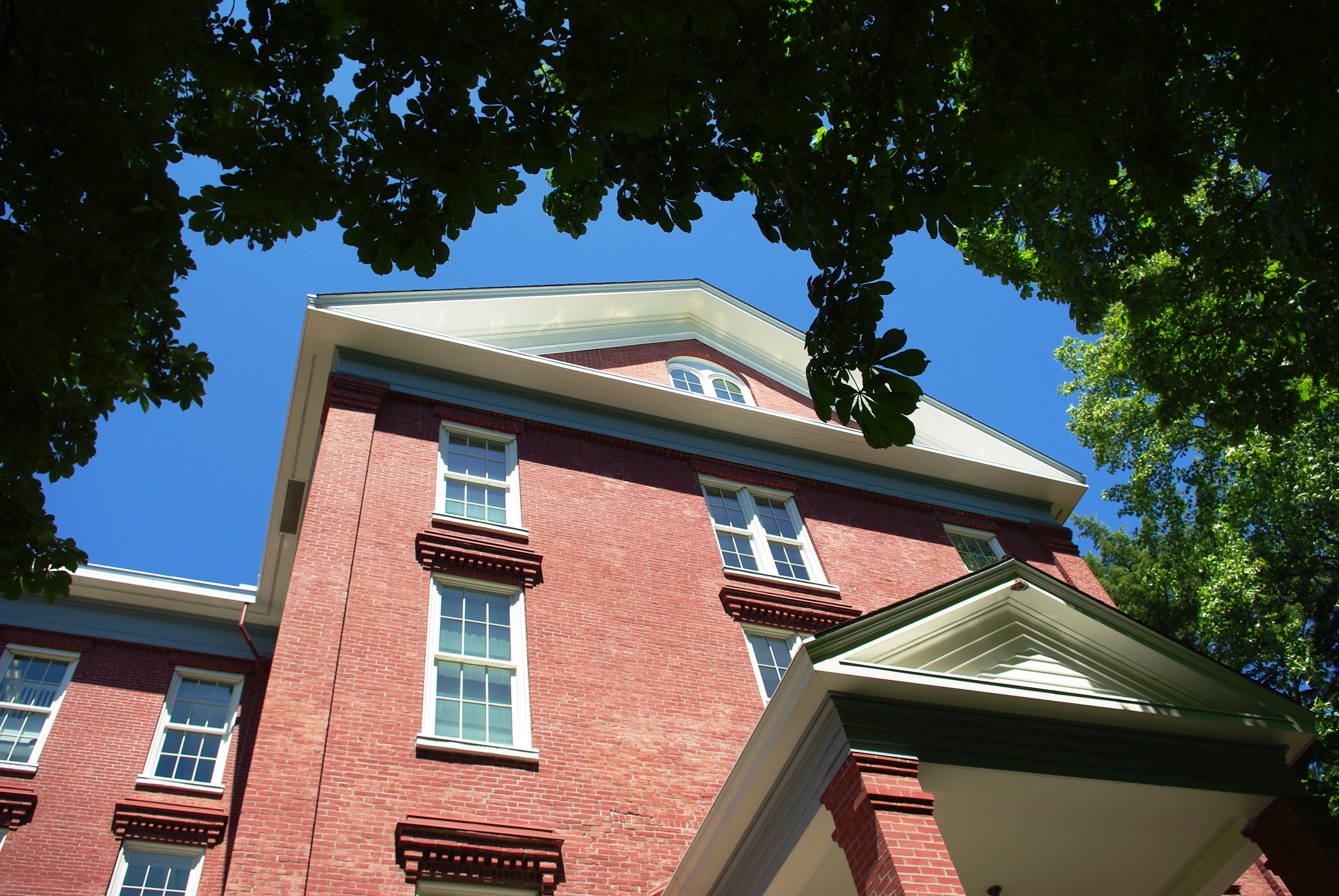
West side of the building

Construction of the new building began in February 1864 with excavation of the basement. This was on the north section of Willamette's campus in downtown Salem. Then on July 24, the cornerstone of the building was laid into place in a ceremony. The President of the Board of Trustees, David Leslie, laid the cornerstone of the hall. This ceremony included a time capsule and a speech by Governor A. C. Gibbs.

All of the bricks used in the construction were fired on campus using clay excavated from the construction site in order to build the foundation. The builders ordered 500,000 bricks total for the construction project. Construction was completed in 1867 and the building was named University Hall. The school "marched" from the old school building to the new and began using it on October 21, 1867.

Total costs for the building were $40,000 at occupation with a need for approximately an additional $17,000 to finish and furnish the building. The building was first used for classrooms, a library, parlors, recitation rooms, and some physical education in the attic. Also in the early years the structure housed the chapel services of the school, and some temporary accommodations for students.

=== Later years ===
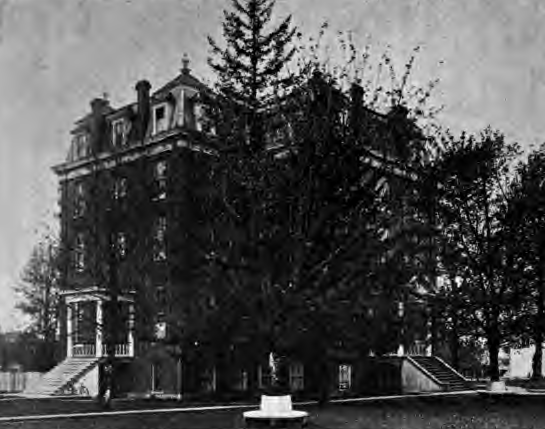
Waller with Mansard style roof

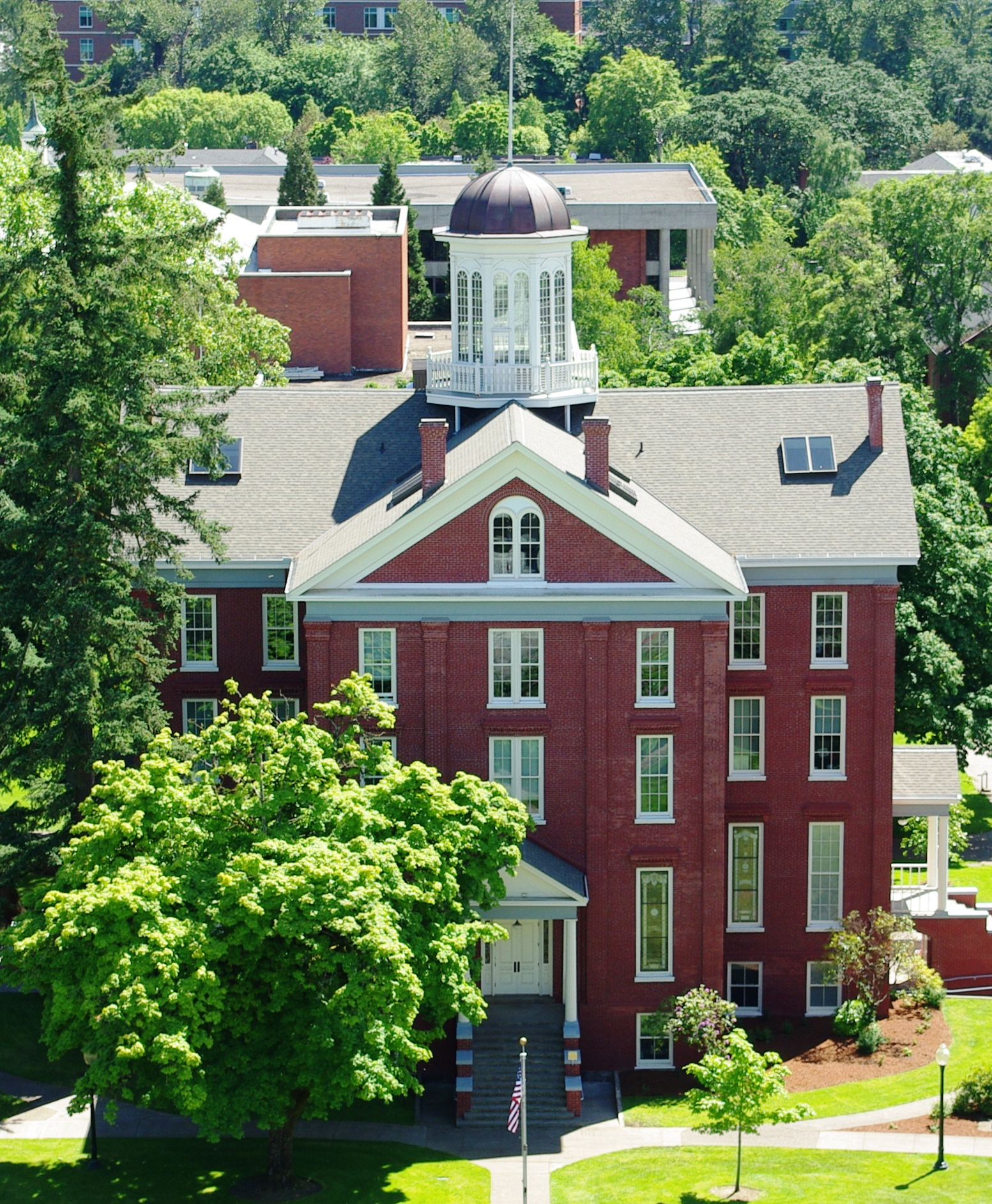
The hall from the Oregon State Capitol

The old school building, the Oregon Institute, burned down in December 1872 leaving University Hall as the only building on campus. As a result, all departments were housed in the building including the College of Law from 1884 to 1923 when it moved to Eaton Hall and the Medical School from 1867 until 1880 when it moved to Portland. University Hall remained the only permanent campus building from 1872 when the Oregon Institute building burned down until 1906 when the Medical Building (now Art Building) was built. Other school buildings such as the first Lausanne Hall were located off campus.

On September 16, 1891, University Hall, the school's first brick building, caught on fire. As a result of the fire the top two floors of the building as well as the roof were destroyed. The building was then re-built after the 1891 fire, but unlike the original plans it was constructed with a Mansard style roof. Additionally, a square tower was also built on top in lieu of the original cupola which included a school bell. From its construction until 1987, Waller Hall was used as an academic hall and hosted classes along with housing the school's chapel and as offices for the faculty.

In 1912, Willamette renamed the building in honor of the Reverend Alvan (Alvin) F. Waller who was instrumental in getting the hall built. Then on December 17, 1919, another fire swept through Waller Hall while school was on break for Christmas. This second fire completely gutted the five-story building, but the exterior walls remained intact. The Mansard roof and square tower were destroyed in the fire. The university rebuilt the hall the following year, and used the original plans that included the round cupola but omitted the Mansard style roof and the square tower topping the structure. Architect Fred A. Legge oversaw the rebuilding and re-design of the hall. A campaign launched in 1920 by the university was set to raise $100,000 to be used for the reconstruction of Waller, plus completing the new Lausanne Hall and adding a central heating plant.

There was some discussion of demolishing the hall in the 1980s after the structure had become dilapidated. One proposal called for building a replica on the same site as the original, but school administrators opted to renovate Waller Hall. From November 1987 to November 1989 the 25,000-square-foot (2,300 m^{2}) building went through a $2.26 million renovation. This renovation addressed interior issues with the building including seismic upgrades in the event of a large magnitude earthquake. These renovations also turned the attic into an office suite for the school's president. After renovations in 1988 the building was used for university administration offices. Further renovations were completed in 2005 at a cost of $1.3 million for upgrading the 100-year-old windows to newer energy efficient models, repairing the brick, fixing leaks, installing skylights, re-painting, and slightly lightening the exterior red-brick coloring.

== Architecture ==
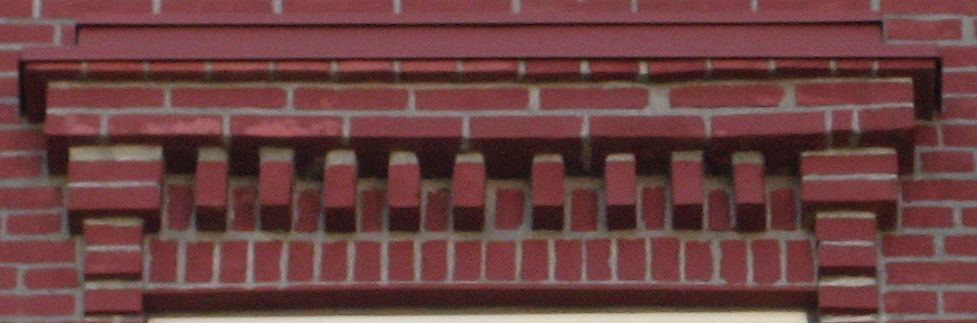
Brick dentils

Waller Hall was built in the Renaissance style of architecture. This red brick building was designed in the same proportions as a Greek cross. Bishop Janes was responsible for proposing this use of the cross shape for the building. Each of the two wings is 84 feet (26 m) long and 44 feet (13 m) wide with aedicule porches on the west, east, and north ends of the building. Originally, the building was 100 feet (30 m) tall as measured from the base of the building to the top of the dome. The distance from the eaves of the structure to the base is 50 feet (15 m). The basement of the building is 12 feet (3.7 m) high and the first floor 16 feet (4.9 m) high. The foundation is made of stone and the roof has composition shingles. Both the second and third floors are 12 feet (3.7 m) tall. The hall has a cupola topping the structure. Other details include pilasters, dentils, and brick corbelling on the exterior and circular stairways on the interior.

== Currently ==
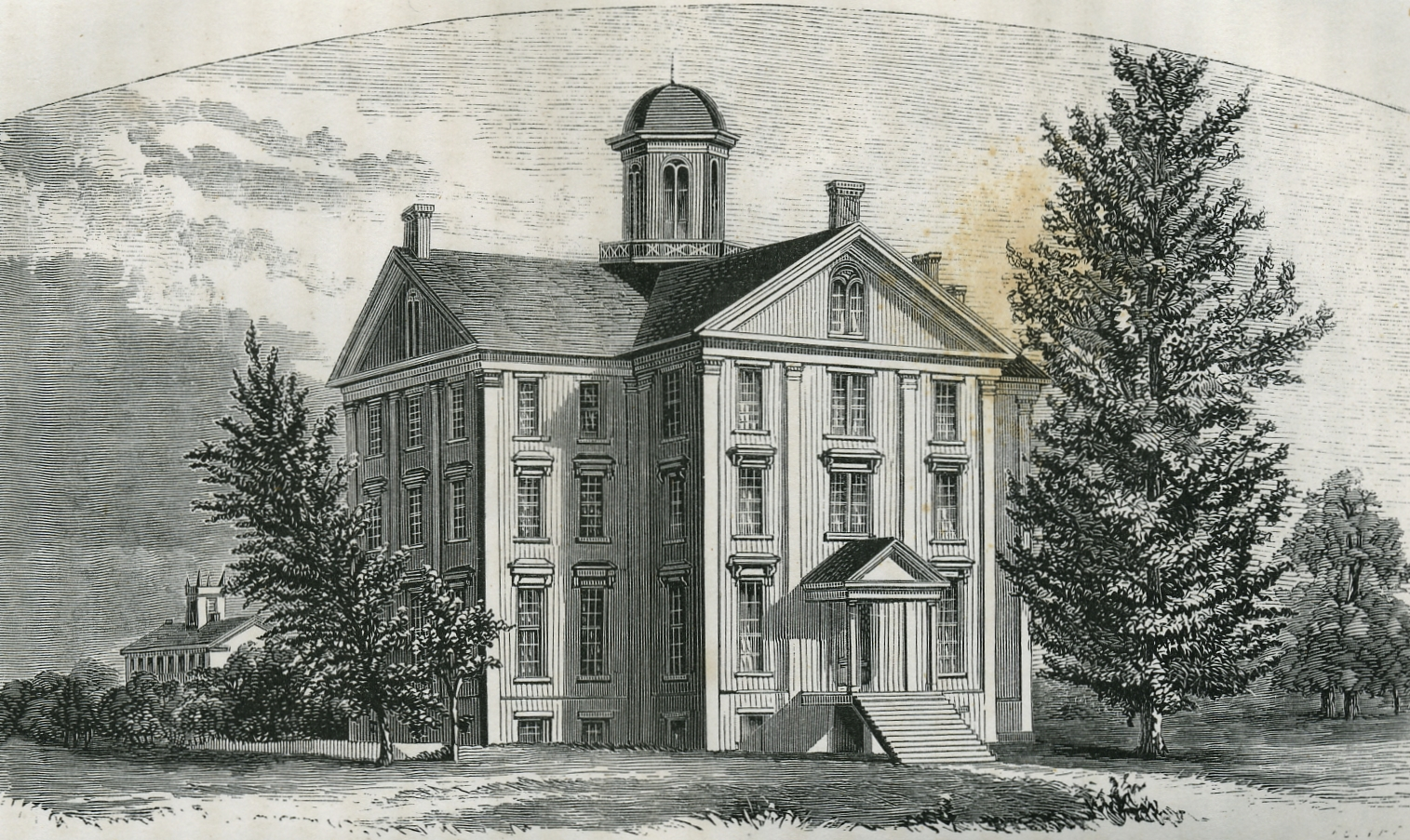
Drawing of Waller Hall in 1868

Waller Hall houses alumni relations, the school's business office, human resources for the university, the office of communications, university relations, the President's office, and other administrative functions. Additionally, Cone Chapel is on the building's second floor and seats 300. Cone Chapel features over a dozen stained glass windows and a classic pipe organ. The chapel is occasionally used for commencement ceremonies, lectures, and concerts at the school. Waller Hall sits in the north central part of campus directly opposite of the Oregon State Capitol. The structure is the oldest university building west of the Mississippi River still in use in the United States.

In 1992, during the university's sesquicentennial, the United States Postal Service issued a postal card that featured an image of Waller Hall. Featuring a watercolor painting by George C. Warner of Eugene, Oregon, these 19 cent postcards were part of the Postal Service's Historic Preservation Series.

== Timeline ==
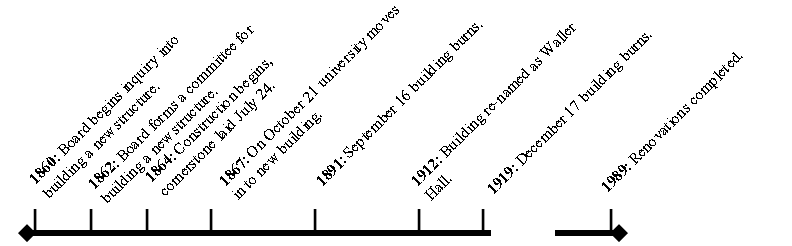

== See also ==
- Methodist Mission
- Old Garfield School (Salem, Oregon)
- Oregon Institute
- State Library of Oregon
