= Oregon Iron Company Furnace =

Iron furnace in Lake Oswego, Oregon, U.S.

- U.S. National Register of Historic Places
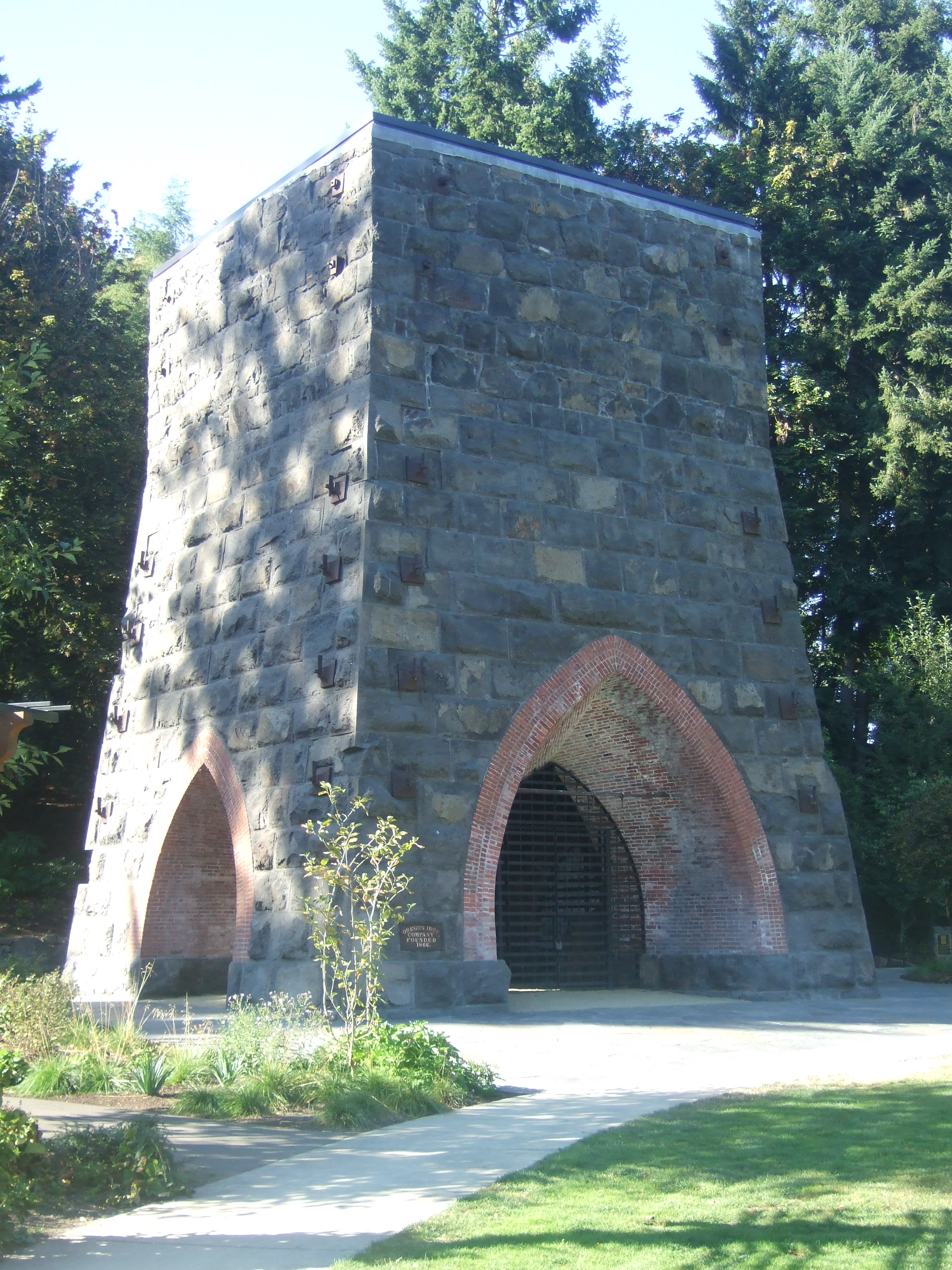
- Restored remnants of the first Oregon Iron Company furnace, 2010

- Location within Oregon
- Nearest city: Lake Oswego, Oregon
- Coordinates: 45°24′39.54″N 122°39′38.52″W
- Built: 1866
- Architect: Richard Martin
- NRHP reference No.: 74001674
- Added to NRHP: 1974

The Oregon Iron Company Furnace, or Oswego Iron Furnace, is an iron furnace used by the Oregon Iron Company, in Lake Oswego, Oregon's George Rogers Park, in the United States. The structure was added to the National Register of Historic Places in 1974 and underwent a major renovation in 2010. The current furnace is the only structure that remains of the original iron company, and is the oldest industrial landmark in the state of Oregon.

== History ==
Before 1862, the majority of Oregon's iron came from the East Coast of the United States. Due to the long and difficult journey, these imported iron products from the East were sold up for up to ten times what they originally cost. Aaron K. Olds, a blacksmith who worked with the first iron on Lake Superior, also created the first iron from Oswego ore in 1862 in his iron forge, despite iron ore being discovered there as early as 1841 by Robert Moore, founder of Linn City. According to his daughter Ellenette Olds Booth, Olds had started the forge with intention to smelt the iron ore. Smelting the ore is an important step that would allow Olds to separate the iron from the raw ore, but the ore proved refractory, and Olds was unable to smelt down the iron.

However, Olds and his business partner H.S. Jacobs, eventually turned a significant profit from creating horseshoe nails and miner's picks that were displayed in Jacobs' wagon shop window on Portland's Front Street. With Olds' profits, a group of investors from Portland saw the economic opportunity that was now available in forming an iron company based in Oregon. The project was, in part, spearheaded by Olds' competitor Henry D. Green, who had purchased the water rights to Sucker Creek and a few acres of land above Oswego Landing in 1862. Water rights were important to hold within the industry, as it would provide the steam power necessary to fuel the engines of the furnaces and work the iron. The area that he purchased is present-day George Rogers Park, and would later also be used as the site of the Oregon Iron Company. Henry, along with his brother John and H.C. Leonard, were influential investors as they also owned the Portland Water Company at the time. As they were stakeholders in the water industry, they also hoped to have a hand in production of iron in the west, rather than pay high prices for iron in iron water pipes imported from the East or other competitors.

After the foundation of the Oregon Iron Company in 1865, William S. Ladd was elected president of the company. H.C. Leonard became the vice-president and the first plant superintendent, and Henry D. Green became the secretary and company director. Twenty stockholders had invested a total of $500,000 in the company by February 1865, with some stockholders being from New York and San Francisco.

Water disputes and Eastern competitors suspended the company several times before finally operations shut down indefinitely in 1894.

== Construction and renovation ==
George D. Wilbur from Connecticut supervised the construction of the furnaces which began in 1866, including the one that remains standing today. Wilbur modeled all the stone furnaces after the furnaces of the Barnum Richardson Company in Lime Rock, Connecticut. The furnaces are 32 feet tall with gothic-style arches lining the walls, 34 feet square at the base, and 26 feet square at the roof. These furnaces were constructed from material from various places. For instance, basalt from the north side of Lake Oswego was used in stonework. Firebrick was imported from Great Britain, and used in the shafts, chimneys and heat exchangers of the furnaces. In order to melt down and refine the iron ore into workable metal iron, the stone walls of the furnaces were constructed to withstand temperatures of up to 2,800°F. Ultimately, the cost of construction was $126,000.

In July 2009, work on the deteriorating arches of the Oregon Iron Company Furnace began. However, after the discovery of more deterioration than previously expected, more materials were necessary and extended the completion by three months. Ultimately, it took nine months and $918,000 for the crews to complete the renovation before its completion in March 2010.

== See also ==
- National Register of Historic Places listings in Clackamas County, Oregon
- National Register of Historic Places listings in Oregon
- Blast furnace
- Oswego Lake
