= Minnehaha (sternwheeler) =

Sternwheeler steamboat

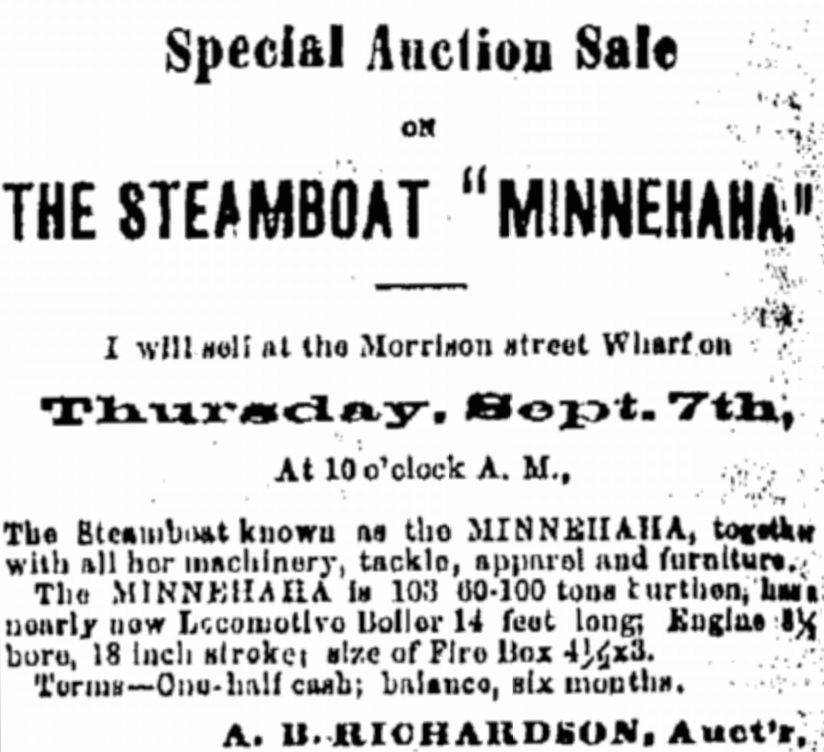
- Advertisement for auction of Minnehaha, September 4, 1871

History
- Name: Minnehaha
- Route: Oswego Lake, Willamette River
- Maiden voyage: October 24, 1866
- Identification: U.S. 90084
- Fate: Broken up 1876

General characteristics
- Type: inland steamboat
- Length: 70 ft (21.3 m) exclusive of fantail.
- Beam: 16 ft (4.9 m) exclusive of guards
- Depth: 3 ft (1 m) 3.5 ft (1 m) or depth of hold
- Installed power: twin steam engines, horizontally mounted, single cylinder, bore 8.5 in (215.90 mm), stroke 18 in (457.20 mm).
- Propulsion: stern-wheel

Minnehaha was a sternwheel-driven steamboat which was built in 1866 on Oswego Lake, then known as Sucker Lake, in Oregon, United States. Minnehaha was later transferred to the Willamette and Columbia rivers where it operated for the first part of the 1870s.

== Construction ==
John C. Trullinger (b.1828) built the Minnehaha on the eastern or "upper" end of Sucker Lake, near a sawmill owned by the Oswego Milling Company.

== Engineering ==
Minnehaha was driven by a stern-wheel, which was turned by twin steam engines removed from the steam scow Skedaddle, which had been built in 1862 on the Tualatin River.

The size of the engines has been variously reported. An 1871 source states that each engine had an internal cylinder diameter, called a "bore" of 8.5 in (215.90 mm) and the distance traveled by the piston, called the "stroke" of 18 in (457.20 mm).

Minnehaha had a locomotive-type boiler 14 feet long, which was described as "nearly new" in September 1871. The size of the firebox was reported to have been 4.5 feet by 3 feet.

== Dimensions ==
Minnehaha was 70 ft (21.3 m) long, exclusive of the extension of the main deck over the stern, called the fantail, on which the stern-wheel was mounted.

The beam (width) of Minnehaha was 16 ft (4.9 m) exclusive of the protective timbers along the upper sides of the hull, called the guards. The depth of hold was 3 ft (1 m) 3.5 ft (1 m).

In 1874, Minnehaha measured out at 103.63 gross tons, which was a measure of volume and not weight. The official merchant registry number in 1874 was 90084.

== Operations ==
=== Other steamers on the lake ===
Minnehaha was the only steamer ever launched upon Sucker Lake. However, Minnehaha was not the only steam vessel ever to operate on the lake; the others were built on the Tualatin River and transferred to the lake.

The small (20 gross tons) Henrietta operating on the lake in 1870. The much larger sternwheeler Onward made at least one trip on Sucker Lake, on January 21, 1873, reaching the lake from the Tualatin through a canal which had recently been completed on the west, or "upper" end of the lake.

=== Sucker Lake service ===
Minnehaha made its trial trip on October 24, 1866, under Captain Richard Copely.

In October 1866, Minnehaha became part of a transportation route to Washington County, Oregon which sought to avoid the navigation barrier then formed by Willamette Falls.

According to a contemporaneous report, the plan for the route would be that the Senator would run to Oswego, on the Willamette River, where passengers would disembark, and cross over to Sucker Lake, as Lake Oswego was then known, and board Minnehaha.

The lake boat then paddled across the water to the lake’s western end, where it was reported, passengers would be taken to Colfax, on the Tualatin River "by cars". Once at Colfax, the steamer Yamhill, with Captain Kellogg in charge, would "be in readiness."

The Yamhill would then steam up the Tualatin River, with, it was projected, excursionists, as far as Taylor’s Bridge. Taylor Bridge was about six miles upriver from Colfax.

While it earned some praise in a newspaper of the time, this route proved to have many problems in practice:

… the passenger was made dizzy by the number of changes and interruptions in the journey. He landed from the Portland boat at what is now Oswego. shinnied up the bank to the lake, and there found a tiny steamboat, the Minnehaha, waiting for him. He boarded it to ride the few miles across the lake to the railroad. There he found a tramway, with the usual five foot gauge, on which were platform cars ten feet long and eight wide, each drawn by two horses. He could ride one if he wished, but it was hardly worth the effort, for it was only a mile and a half to the Tualatin River. There the Onward waited to make its weekly trip up the Tualatin …

Minnehaha was continuing to run on Sucker Lake on February 11, 1869.

== Transfer to Willamette River ==
It was possible to bring a steamboat down Sucker Creek from Sucker Creek to the Willamette River, if appropriate measures were taken, including the building of a coffer dam in the abandoned mill race. James D. Miller did this with the Onward.

With the Oswego–Tualatin canal not completed until 1872, a similar procedure would likely have had to have been followed, between February 11, 1869 and early September 1871, to bring Minnehaha to the Willamette River.

=== Sale at Auction ===
In September 1871, Minnehaha was sold at auction, either by the sheriff or, more likely, by A.B. Richardson, auctioneer. The auction was conducted on the Minnehaha itself, at the dock at the foot of Morrison Street in Portland, Oregon. The purchaser at the auction was Barney Train, of East Portland.

=== Willamette and Columbia river service ===
In 1874, Minnehaha was engaged in light towing service on the lower Willamette and Columbia rivers.

== Disposition ==
Minnehaha was dismantled in 1876 at Portland.
