= Oregon Iron Works (disambiguation) =

Oregon Iron Works may refer to:

- Oregon Iron Works, a company founded in 1944 and located in Clackamas, Oregon, United States
- Oregon Iron Works, a colloquial name for the Oregon Iron Company, which operated from 1865 to 1928 in Oswego, Oregon, United States
- Oregon Iron Works (Albina), an American company from Albina, Oregon, that built steamships among other products
