= Oregon Iron Company =

Former iron smelting enterprise

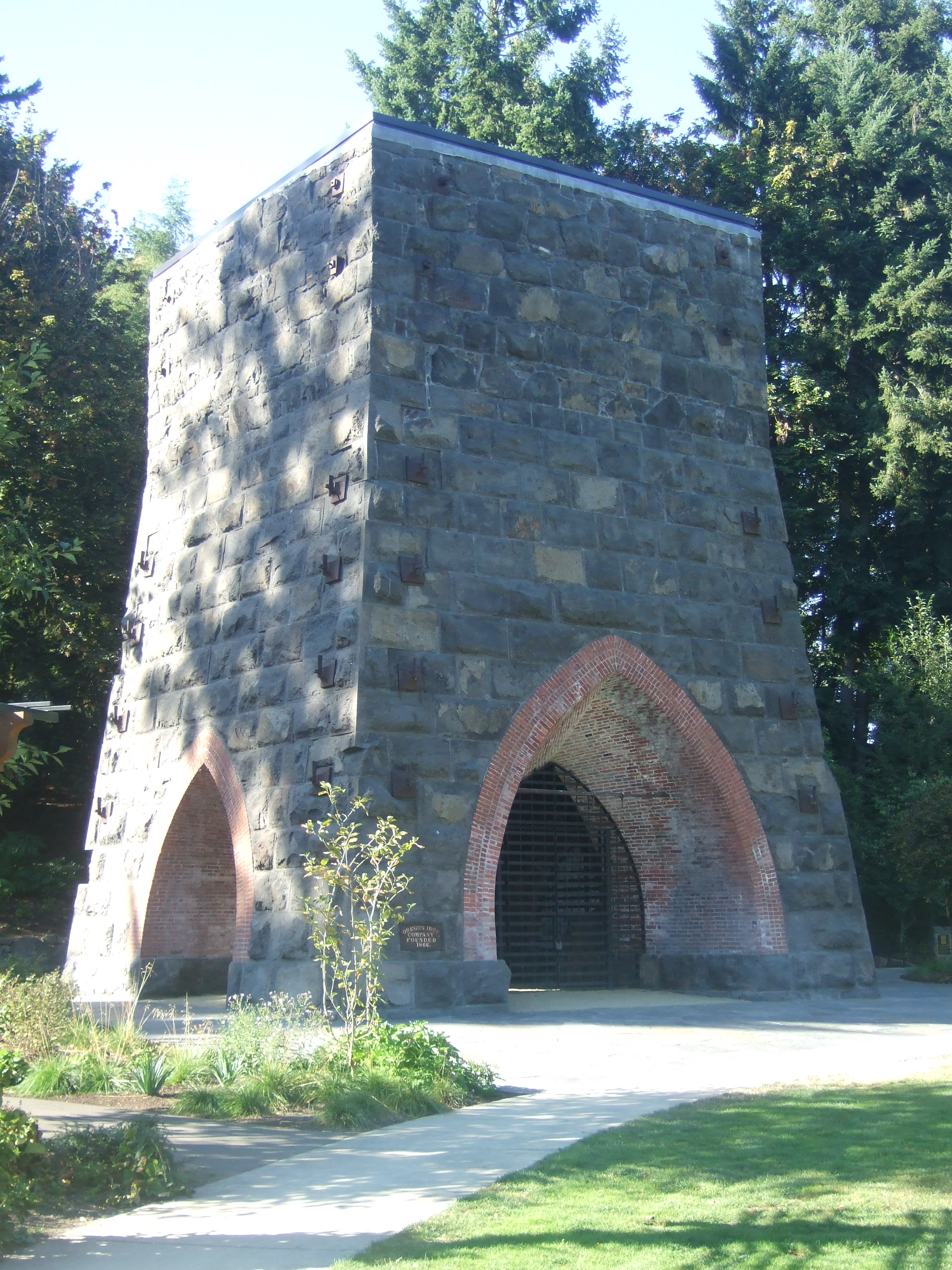
Restored remnants of the Oregon Iron Company Furnace

The Oregon Iron Company was an iron smelting company located in what is now Lake Oswego, Oregon. The company was established in 1865, and in 1867, became the first company west of the Rocky Mountains in the United States to smelt iron. The company failed after a few years, but was reorganized as the Oswego Iron Company in 1878, and again as the Oregon Iron and Steel Company in 1883. With the addition of a larger furnace, the last incarnation of the company prospered, reaching peak production in 1890. By 1894, however, pressure from cheaper imported iron combined with the effects of the Panic of 1893 forced the company to close its smelter. The company continued to operate a pipe foundry until 1928, and until the early 1960s, existed as a land management company, selling its real estate holdings which expanded the city of Lake Oswego.

== Early history ==
The discovery of iron ore near the settlement of Oswego in the hills south of Portland is credited to Morton M. McCarver (who had served as speaker of the Provisional Legislature of Oregon) in 1862. McCarver's brown hematite ore was tested and found to be of excellent quality, containing from 56 to 75% metal. In addition, the ore lay near the surface and the Oswego bed was estimated to contain 60,000 short tons (54,000 t) of ore. Since the site also featured vast forests that could be turned into charcoal to feed the smelting furnaces, and ready access to water for power, the potential of a successful mining operation was easily recognized.

In 1865, a group of financiers in Portland, which included former Portland mayors William S. Ladd and Henry Failing, as well as Portland Gas Light Company founders Herman C. Leonard and John Green, incorporated an iron smelting company which they named the Oregon Iron Company. Ladd, who served as president, and the others hoped to make Oswego the "Pittsburgh of the West", believing that having a local source of iron would help their other businesses, which included the Oregon Central Railroad and the Oregon Steam Navigation Company.

== Construction ==
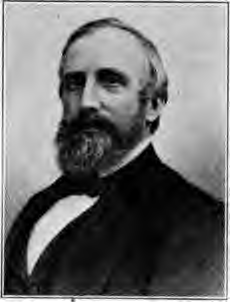
William S. Ladd led the group of financiers that founded the Oregon Iron Company in 1865

To oversee construction of a charcoal-fired blast furnace, the company recruited George Wilbur. He modeled his design on the Barnum and Richardson Company furnace in Lime Rock, Connecticut. The furnace was designed by British stonemason Richard Martin and was completed in 1867. Meanwhile, a dam was built on Sucker Creek to harness water for power, forests were cleared to be turned into charcoal to feed the furnace, and limestone, used during iron smelting to remove impurities, was quarried from the San Juan Islands in Washington Territory, and shipped and unloaded at the company docks on the adjacent Willamette River.

On August 24, 1867, the Oregon Iron Company became the first company in the United States to smelt pig iron west of the Rocky Mountains. The first pigs were given to J. C. Trullinger, who owned the townsite of Oswego. From 1867 to 1869, the company smelted nearly 2,400 short tons (2,200 t) of iron.

Ladd's group soon found their business expertise in other areas did not apply as well to the iron industry. Their lack of experience, coupled with a dispute over water rights, caused the company to close in 1869. After a brief respite in which they filled an order for iron wheels for the Central Pacific Railroad from 1874 to 1876, the company closed for good in 1878 and the assets were sold off at a sheriff's auction.

== Oswego Iron Company ==
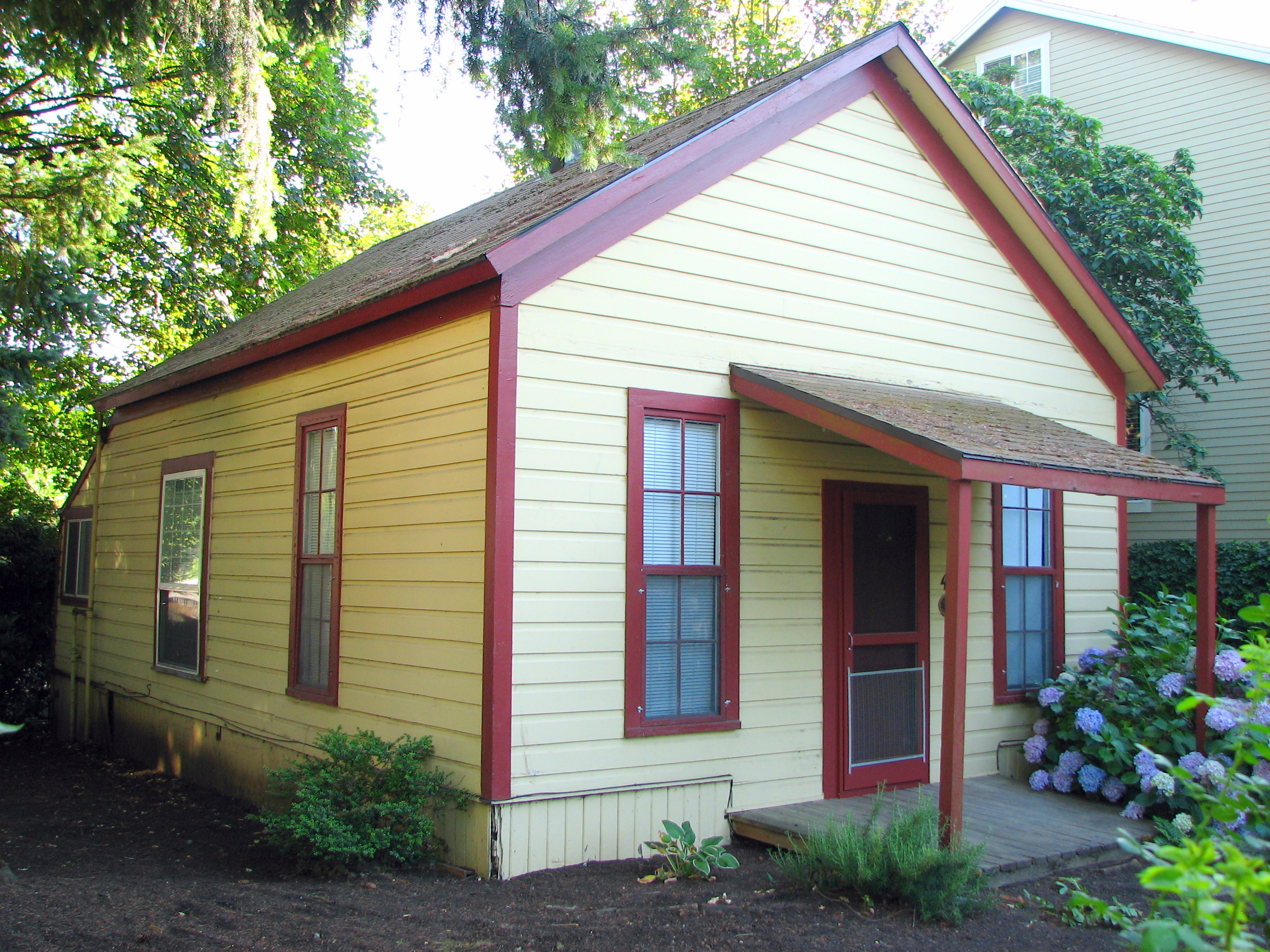
This cottage in Lake Oswego's Old Town was built by the Oswego Iron Company for workers in about 1882. It was added to the National Register of Historic Places in 2009.

The purchasers were led by Ernest Crichton and L. B. Seeley, experienced furnace managers from Ohio's Hanging Rock iron region. Under the new name of the Oswego Iron Company, the company made a number of significant improvements: they purchased the Oswego townsite along with large tracts of forest, settled the water rights issue, remodeled the furnace, opened several new mines, constructed several homes for its workers, and built a narrow gauge railroad for hauling the ore. From 1877 to 1881, the Oswego Iron Company produced 18,500 short tons (16,800 t) of iron.

However, to finance these improvements, the company also incurred massive debt, and with the market price for iron remaining low, the company was sold in 1880 to another group of Portland financiers led by Simeon Gannett Reed and railroad baron Henry Villard.

== Oregon Iron and Steel Company ==
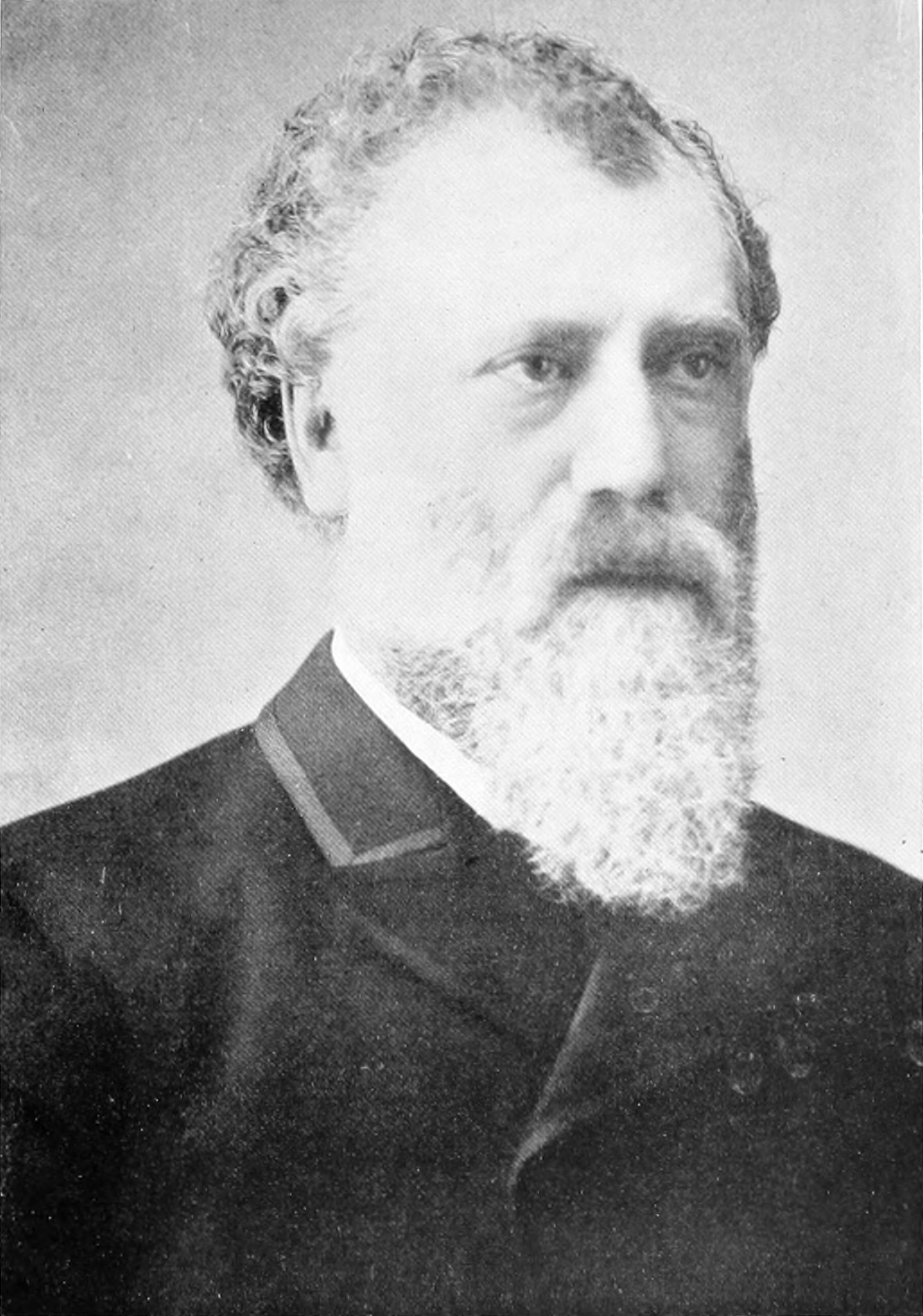
Simeon G. Reed became president of the Oregon Iron & Steel Company in 1882

In 1882, the company was reincorporated as the Oregon Iron and Steel Company with Reed as its president and William M. Ladd, son of Oregon Iron Company founder William S. Ladd, as its vice president. With the elder Ladd, Villard, and Darius Ogden Mills also providing financing, the company built a new smelter north of the original furnace with five times its capacity, 50 short tons (45 t). The new iron works opened in 1888, and production boomed. The company employed 300 men and Oswego's population soared, as hotels, churches, saloons, and an opera house were built to support the town. A railroad line to Portland was completed in 1886, making Oswego more accessible.

The company reached its peak production in 1890, smelting 12,305 short tons (11,163 t) of iron. However, half the company's resources were dedicated to making charcoal from wood. The availability of cheaper imported coke-fired iron, the overall reduction in demand for iron as railroad expansion slowed, and the economic effects of the Panic of 1893, all combined to hasten the final closure of the furnace in 1894. The company continued to operate a pipe foundry on the site of the new furnace until 1928.

The Willamette Meteorite was discovered on Oregon Iron & Steel property. An attempt was made to steal it.

In 1917, the Pacific Coast Steel Company bought the furnace as a precautionary measure to insure a supply of pig iron during a present scarcity.

== Land development ==
Despite its lack of industry, the company still found itself with thousands of acres of land that could be developed. William M. Ladd, who had succeeded Reed as President of Oregon Iron and Steel and his father as President of Ladd & Tilton Bank, formed the Ladd Estate Company to manage these real estate assets. The newly formed Ladd Estate Company converted the depressed company town into a prestigious suburb complete with country club, golf course, polo field, and even worked to rename the harsh-sounding Sucker Lake to Oswego Lake. The company existed as a shell until 1960, when in its final act, it deeded its powerhouse and dams to lake shareholders.

== Remnants of infrastructure ==
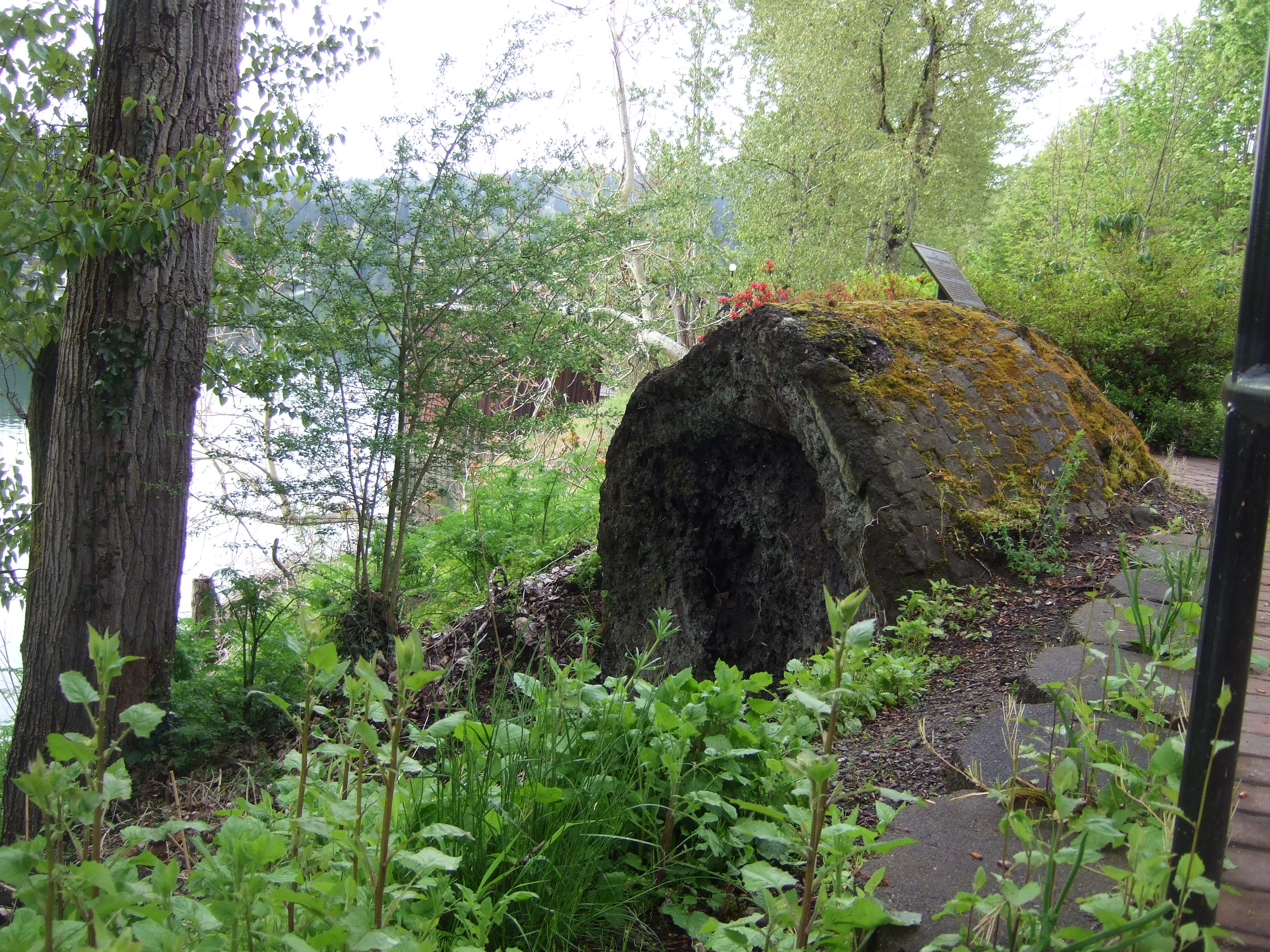
Remains of the crucible of the second furnace in Lake Oswego's Roehr Park on the bank of the Willamette River

The original blast furnace still stands in Lake Oswego's George Rogers Park along the Willamette River, the only extant iron furnace west of the Rocky Mountains. It was placed on the National Register of Historic Places in 1974. In 2010, a seven-year restoration of the furnace was completed.

Of the two first pigs smelted in 1867, one is displayed in the Oregon Historical Society and one remains in place as a street marker at the northwest corner of Ladd and Durham streets in Lake Oswego. The crucible from the second furnace, which was dismantled and sold for scrap in 1926, is still intact in Lake Oswego's Roehr Park.
