= Durham, Oregon =

- City
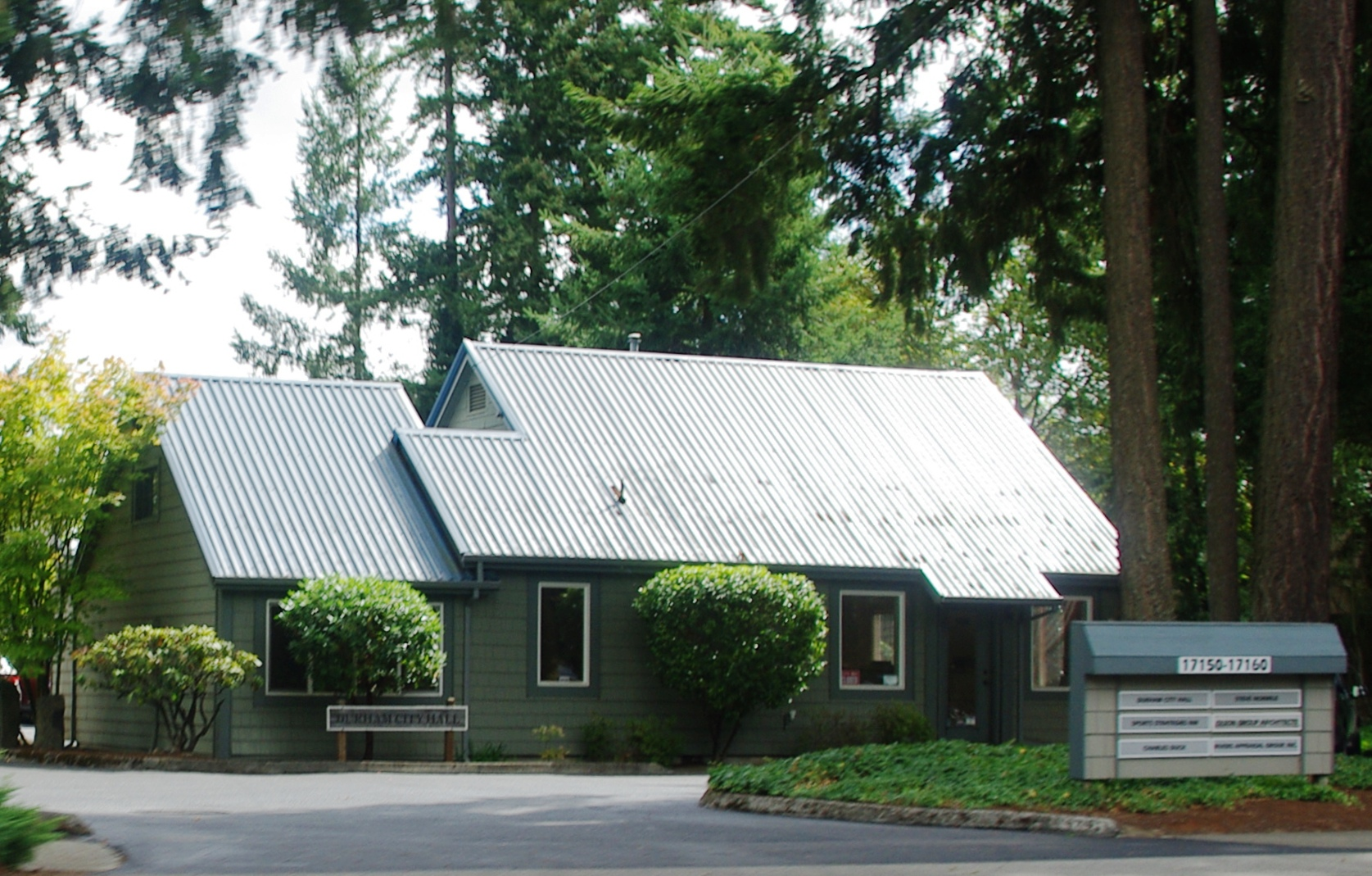
- City hall

- Seal

- Location in Oregon

- Location in the United States
- Coordinates: 45°23′40″N 122°45′29″W
- Country: United States
- State: Oregon
- County: Washington
- Incorporated: 1966

Government
  - Mayor: Gery Schirado

Area
  - Total: 0.41 sq mi (1.06 km^{2})
  - Land: 0.41 sq mi (1.06 km^{2})
  - Water: 0 sq mi (0.00 km^{2})
- Elevation: 200 ft (61 m)

Population (2020)
  - Total: 1,944
  - Density: 4,745.8/sq mi (1,832.36/km^{2})
- Time zone: UTC-8 (Pacific)
  - Summer (DST): UTC-7 (Pacific)
- ZIP code: 97224
- Area codes: 503 and 971
- FIPS code: 41-21250
- GNIS feature ID: 2410376
- Website: www.durham-oregon.us

Durham is a city in Washington County, Oregon, United States. Incorporated in 1966, the city is surrounded by Tigard and Tualatin and is adjacent to the Bridgeport Village shopping complex. As of the 2020 census, Durham had a population of 1,944.

== History ==
The city was named for Albert Alonzo Durham, founder of the nearby city of Lake Oswego. Durham operated a sawmill and a flour mill on Fanno Creek, which flows through the city, from 1866 until his death in 1898. The site, located along the Boones Ferry Road to Portland, was originally known as Durhams Mills. In 1908, the Oregon Electric Railway established a stop called Durham at the location. Residents of the city voted for incorporation in 1966 to protect the location from industrialization of its residential areas. Today, the community is primarily residential.

== Geography ==
According to the United States Census Bureau, the city has a total area of 0.41 square miles (1.06 km^{2}), all land. It sits at 197 feet (60 m) above sea-level. The main road through Durham is Upper Boones Ferry Road, with Interstate 5 approximately 0.5 miles (0.8 km) east of the city. Part of the western boundary of the city is the Tualatin River, with Durham City Park also on the western edge of Durham.

== Government ==
Durham's mayor is Gery Schirado and the city administrator is Linda Tate. Children in the community attend the schools of the Tigard-Tualatin School District. The city's police protection is provided under contract by the Tualatin Police Department, and fire protection is provided by Tualatin Valley Fire & Rescue. The city is part of the Tigard Water District for drinking water, while wastewater treatment is provided by Clean Water Services. Durham's annual budget is around $2.4 million.

== Demographics ==
Historical population
Census	Pop.	Note	%±
1970	410		—
1980	707		72.4%
1990	748		5.8%
2000	1,382		84.8%
2010	1,351		−2.2%
2020	1,944		43.9%
U.S. Decennial Census

=== 2020 census ===
As of the 2020 census, Durham had a population of 1,944. The median age was 37.7 years. 23.2% of residents were under the age of 18 and 16.9% were 65 years of age or older. For every 100 females there were 90.6 males, and for every 100 females age 18 and over there were 87.6 males age 18 and over.

100.0% of residents lived in urban areas, while 0% lived in rural areas.

There were 850 households in Durham, of which 30.7% had children under the age of 18 living in them. Of all households, 38.1% were married-couple households, 19.2% were households with a male householder and no spouse or partner present, and 34.4% were households with a female householder and no spouse or partner present. About 31.6% of all households were made up of individuals and 11.1% had someone living alone who was 65 years of age or older.

There were 873 housing units, of which 2.6% were vacant. Among occupied housing units, 36.6% were owner-occupied and 63.4% were renter-occupied. The homeowner vacancy rate was <0.1% and the rental vacancy rate was 2.0%.

Racial composition as of the 2020 census
Race	Number	Percent
White	1,283	66.0%
Black or African American	41	2.1%
American Indian and Alaska Native	21	1.1%
Asian	81	4.2%
Native Hawaiian and Other Pacific Islander	57	2.9%
Some other race	251	12.9%
Two or more races	210	10.8%
Hispanic or Latino (of any race)	429	22.1%

=== 2010 census ===
As of the census of 2010, there were 1,351 people, 545 households, and 371 families living in the city. The population density was 3,295.1 inhabitants per square mile (1,272.2/km^{2}). There were 561 housing units at an average density of 1,368.3 per square mile (528.3/km^{2}). The racial makeup of the city was 83.8% White, 1.7% African American, 0.4% Native American, 1.3% Asian, 1.4% Pacific Islander, 8.2% from other races, and 3.2% from two or more races. Hispanic or Latino of any race were 13.8% of the population.

There were 545 households, of which 33.6% had children under the age of 18 living with them, 51.9% were married couples living together, 12.3% had a female householder with no husband present, 3.9% had a male householder with no wife present, and 31.9% were non-families. 24.2% of all households were made up of individuals, and 5.7% had someone living alone who was 65 years of age or older. The average household size was 2.48 and the average family size was 2.95.

The median age in the city was 38.1 years. 24.1% of residents were under the age of 18; 9.7% were between the ages of 18 and 24; 23.8% were from 25 to 44; 32% were from 45 to 64; and 10.3% were 65 years of age or older. The gender makeup of the city was 48.3% male and 51.7% female.

=== 2000 census ===
As of the census of 2000, there were 1,382 people, 528 households, and 391 families living in the city. The population density was 3,144.3 inhabitants per square mile (1,214.0/km^{2}). There were 552 housing units at an average density of 1,255.9 per square mile (484.9/km^{2}). The racial makeup of the city was 89.29% White, 0.80% African American, 0.72% Native American, 1.66% Asian, 0.36% Pacific Islander, 3.18% from other races, and 3.98% from two or more races. Hispanic or Latino of any race were 7.81% of the population.

There were 528 households, out of which 43.2% had children under the age of 18 living with them, 56.8% were married couples living together, 14.4% had a female householder with no husband present, and 25.8% were non-families. 18.9% of all households were made up of individuals, and 3.2% had someone living alone who was 65 years of age or older. The average household size was 2.62 and the average family size was 3.01.

In the city, the population was spread out, with 30.9% under the age of 18, 6.5% from 18 to 24, 29.6% from 25 to 44, 27.1% from 45 to 64, and 5.9% who were 65 years of age or older. The median age was 34 years. For every 100 females, there were 94.1 males. For every 100 females age 18 and over, there were 87.3 males.

The median income for a household in the city was $51,806, and the median income for a family was $64,531. Males had a median income of $59,712 versus $33,750 for females. The per capita income for the city was $29,099. About 10.2% of families and 10.8% of the population were below the poverty line, including 14.7% of those under age 18 and 13.7% of those age 65 or over.

== Education ==
It is in the Tigard-Tualatin School District 23J.
