= Oswego Lake =

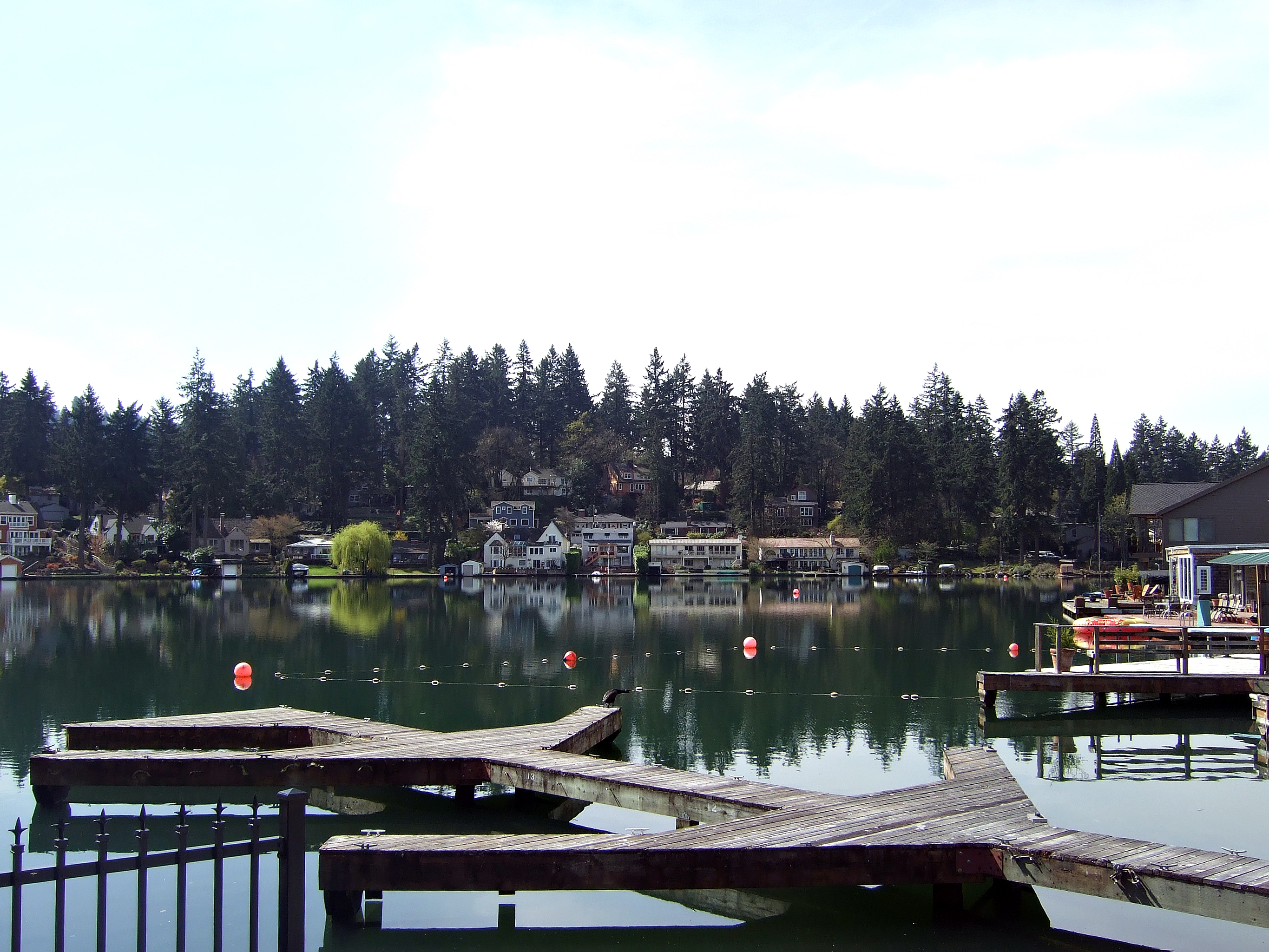
- Lakewood Bay (connected to the main lake in 1928)

- Location within Oregon Location within the United States
- Location: Lake Oswego, Clackamas County, Oregon
- Coordinates: 45°24′34″N 122°41′47″W
- Type: Kolk depression/Reservoir
- Primary inflows: Tualatin River, Springbrook Creek
- Primary outflows: Willamette River (via Oswego Creek)
- Catchment area: 6.6 mi^{2} (17 km^{2})
- Basin countries: United States
- Max. length: 3 mi (4.8 km)
- Max. width: 0.3 mi (0.48 km)
- Surface area: 431.7 acres (1.747 km^{2})
- Average depth: 26 ft (7.9 m)
- Max. depth: 55 ft (17 m)
- Water volume: 10,055 acre⋅ft (12,403,000 m^{3})
- Residence time: 2 months
- Shore length^{1}: 11.95 mi (19.23 km)
- Surface elevation: 99 ft (30 m)
- Islands: Jantzen Island
- Settlements: Lake Oswego
- ^{1} Shore length is not a well-defined measure.

Oswego Lake is in Clackamas County, Oregon, United States, and is completely surrounded by the city of Lake Oswego. Though the lake is naturally occurring (a former channel of the Tualatin River), it has been significantly altered because of the concrete dam that has increased its size to 431.7 acres (1.747 km^{2}). The United States Geological Survey records the official name as Lake Oswego and, because of its artificially increased size, classifies it as a reservoir. To distinguish it from the city, however, the lake is usually called Oswego Lake.

== Geologic history ==
The lake is a former channel of the Tualatin River, carved in basalt to the Willamette River. Eventually, the river changed course and abandoned the Oswego route.

About 13,000 to 15,000 years ago, the ice dam that contained Glacial Lake Missoula ruptured, resulting in the Missoula Floods, which backed the Columbia River up the Willamette River. The flooding created an underwater vortex called a kolk, which scoured out and enlarged the old Oswego channel, creating a natural lake. The rocks and boulders were flung by the kolk up to a mile away to present-day Durham and Tualatin, where they were quarried for many years before the site was converted to the Bridgeport Village shopping center.

== Early human habitation ==
Some Native Americans called the lake "waluga" (meaning swan) because wild swans lived there. With the arrival of European settlers in the mid-19th century, the lake was called Sucker Lake for a type of fish that was abundant in its waters. In 1847, Albert Alonzo Durham built a sawmill on Sucker Creek, the lake's outlet to the Willamette River. In 1850, he made the first Donation Land Claim in the area, which he named Oswego after Oswego, New York.

== Iron industry ==
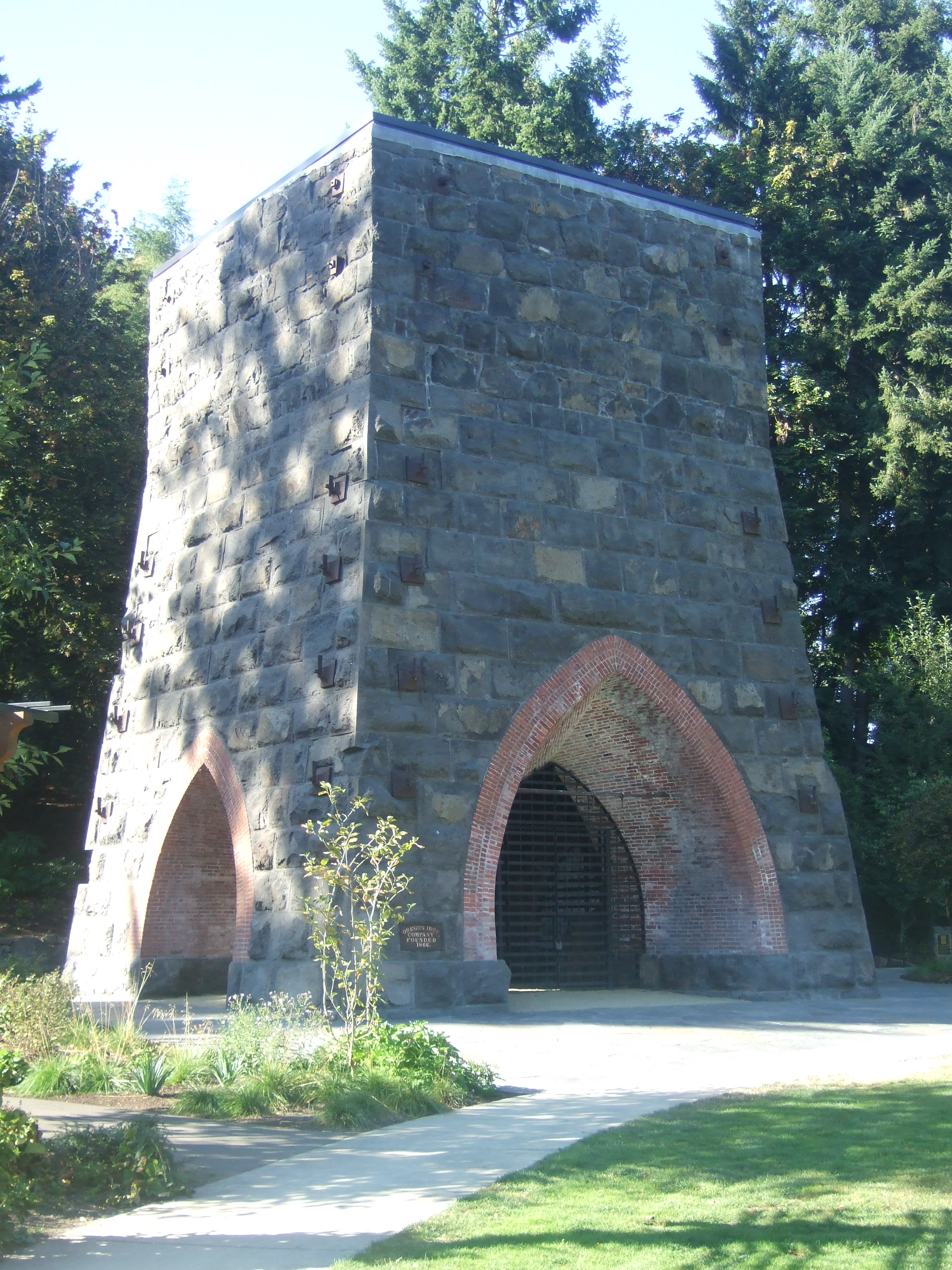
Remains of the Oregon Iron Company Furnace in Lake Oswego's George Rogers Park

In 1865, the Oregon Iron Company was incorporated with the goal of making the town of Oswego an industrial center for the smelting of the abundant iron ore in the area. The company purchased the entire town of Oswego, including the lake and surrounding hills, which were rich in not only iron ore, but trees that would be turned into charcoal to feed the furnaces. Population in the town boomed, aided by the opening of a narrow gauge railroad from Portland in 1886. The Oregon iron industry peaked in 1890, but with the availability of cheaper coke-fired iron and steel mills, by the early 20th century it had nearly collapsed.

== Lake expansion ==
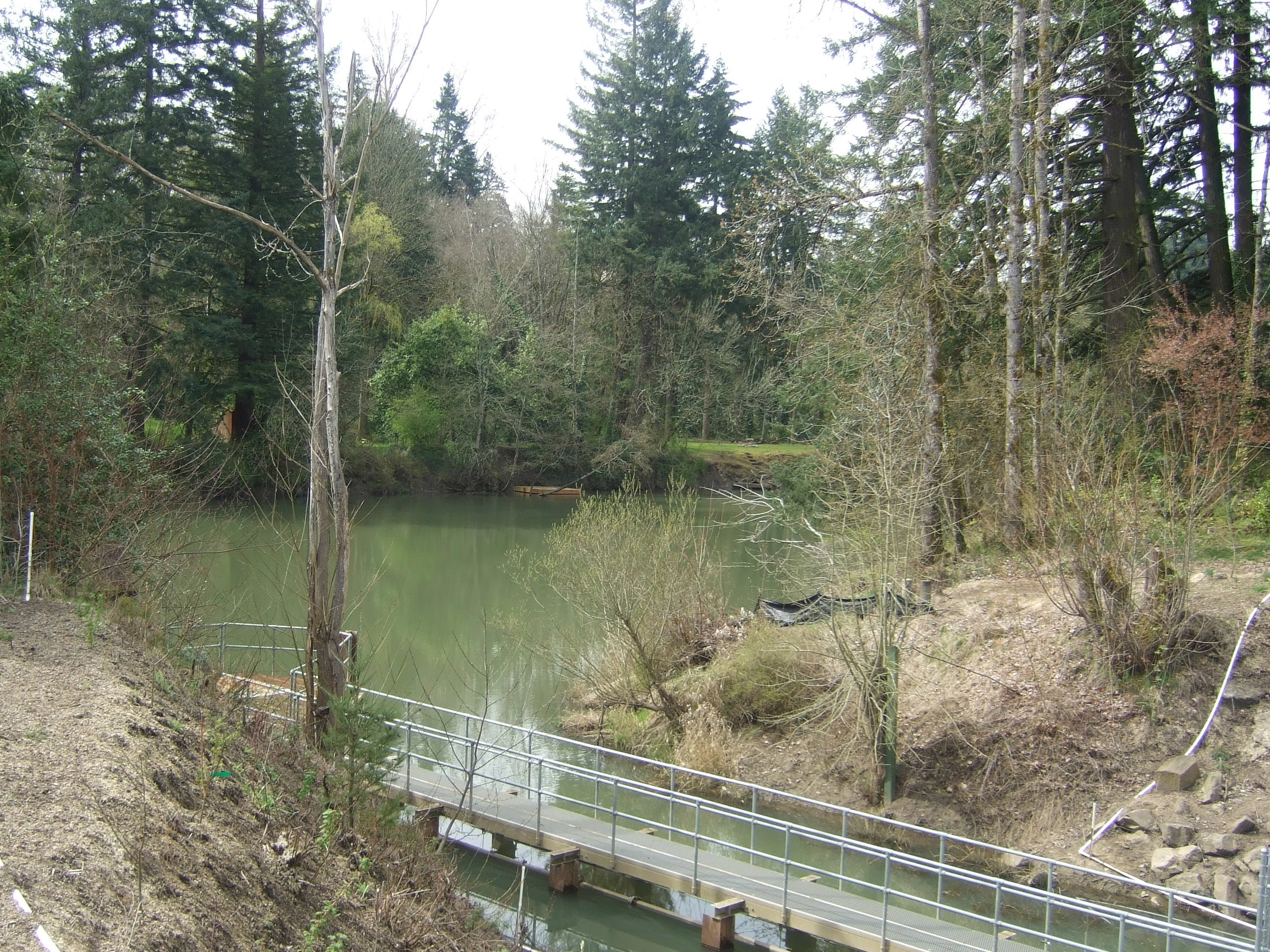
The Lake Oswego Canal was built in 1872 to connect then-Sucker Lake to the Tualatin River.

In 1871, the Tualatin River Navigation & Manufacturing Company began work to build a continuous waterway that would connect the Tualatin River to the Willamette. The company planned to build two canals: one to connect the Tualatin to the lake to provide access to the iron smelter, and a second with locks that would connect the lake to the Willamette via Sucker Creek. The first canal was finished in 1872, but due to low water, was not passed through until January 21, 1873, when the sternwheeler Onward made the first trip. In 1873, the completion of the Willamette Falls Locks made traffic past Willamette Falls possible without portage; since the Tualatin was more difficult to navigate anyway, the idea of a second canal was abandoned.

A series of wooden dams had been built at the outlet to Sucker Creek beginning in 1860 to provide water power; but since winter floods would wash out these dams within a few years, in 1921 a concrete dam was built, which not only provided a more reliable power source, but also allowed the lake level to be precisely controlled. The level was allowed to rise several feet to cover the unsightly stumps left over from logging and create a more visually appealing shoreline.

With the name Sucker Lake considered unappealing to potential residents, the community decided to rename the lake. While "Lake Tualatin" was considered, in 1913 the United States Board on Geographic Names officially renamed it Oswego Lake. In 1961, the USGS officially changed the name to "Lake Oswego," though the old name is usually used to avoid confusion with the name of the city.

In 1928, a marshy area known as the Duck Pond adjacent to the lake was flooded, and a canal dug to it to connect to the main lake to create Lakewood Bay, which allowed more shoreline homes to be built next to the newly completed Pacific Highway (now part of Oregon Route 43).

== Land development ==
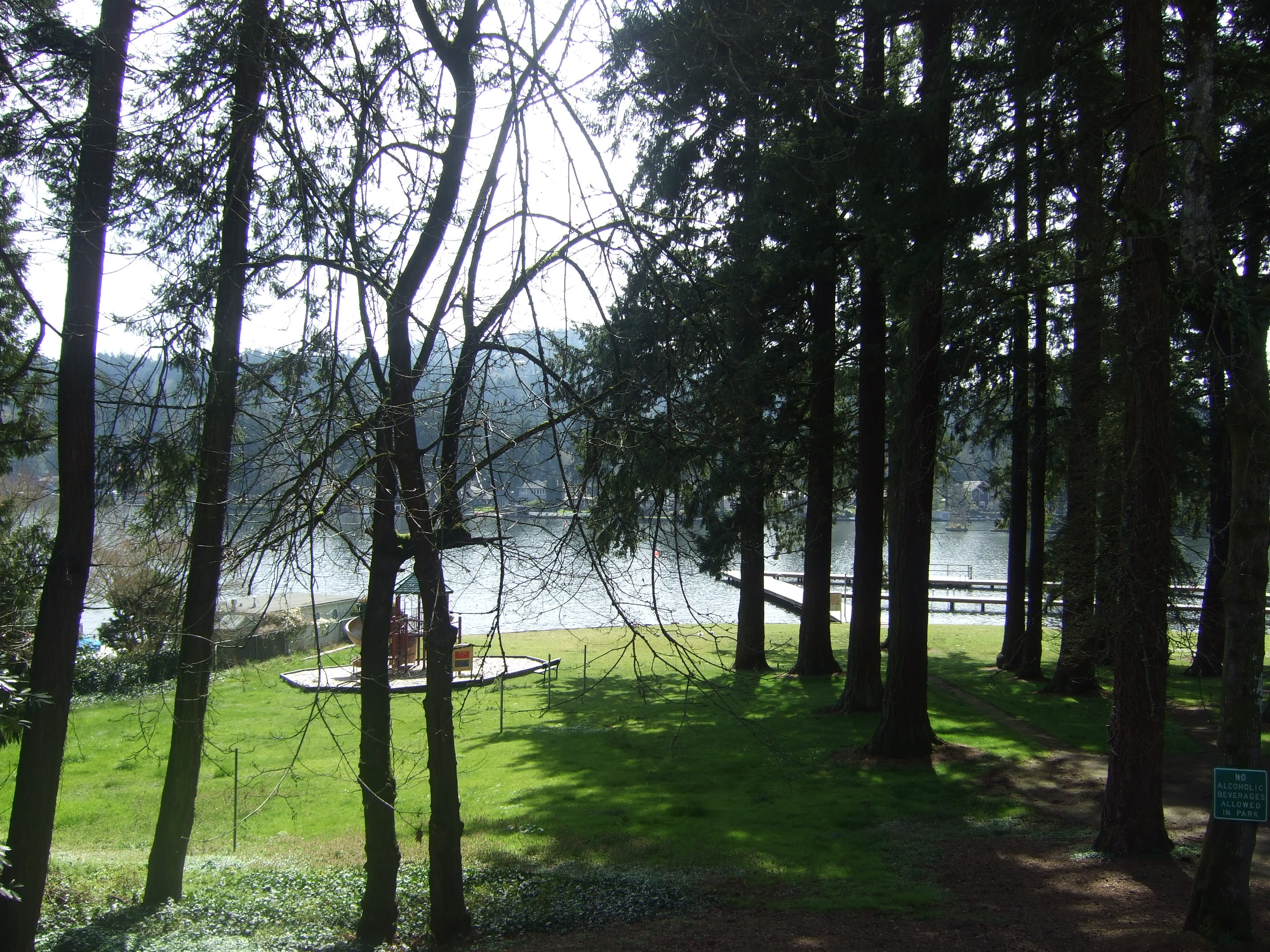
The Lake Grove Swim Park on the north shore of Oswego Lake, one of several swim parks

With the demise of the iron industry, the now-renamed Oregon Iron & Steel Company turned to development of its approximately 23,000 acres (93 km^{2}) of land surrounding the lake. The company built a power plant in 1909, just before the incorporation of the City of Oswego in 1910. Headed by Oregon Iron & Steel president William M. Ladd (son of former Portland mayor William S. Ladd, who was one of the original investors in the Oregon Iron Company), the Ladd Estate Company converted the iron town into a prestigious lakeside retreat.

In 1924, Paul Murphy developed the Oswego Lake Country Club to promote Oswego as a place to "live where you play." The Paul Murphy Company replaced Ladd's company as developer of Oregon Iron and Steel's property in 1940, and the following year, Oregon Iron and Steel created the Lake Oswego Corporation, which still owns the lake as a private corporation of lakefront property owners. In 1960, shortly before ending its existence, Oregon Iron & Steel deeded the powerhouse and dams to the corporation.

With the relative scarcity of building easements, lakefront property remains prestigious, and a number of architecturally significant homes have been built along its shores, including the Carl C. Jantzen Estate, a Tudor-style estate on the National Register of Historic Places, built on an island on the lake's north shore by the founder of the Jantzen swimwear company in 1930. In addition, the lakeshore features homes by noted Portland architects such as Richard Sundeleaf and Van Evera Bailey.

== Ownership and access ==
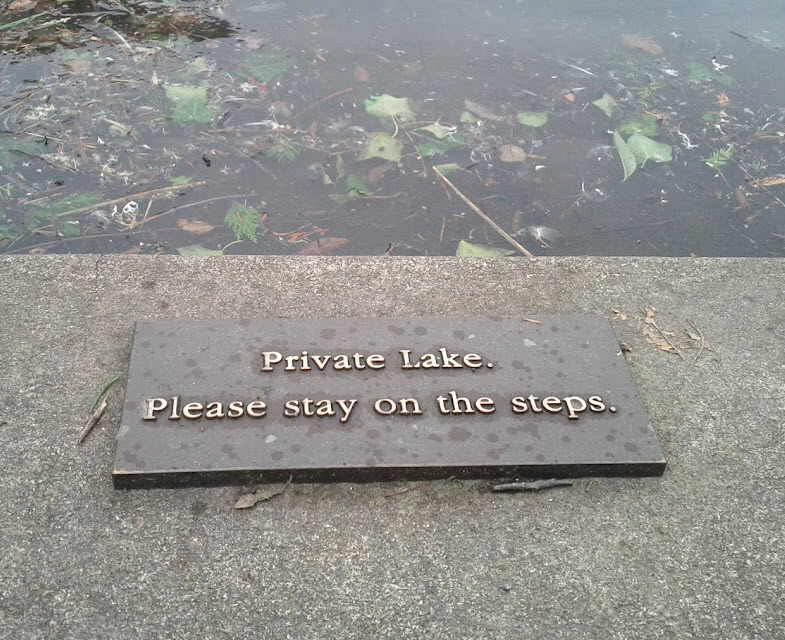
Millennium Plaza Park steps with sign asserting private lake status, 2012

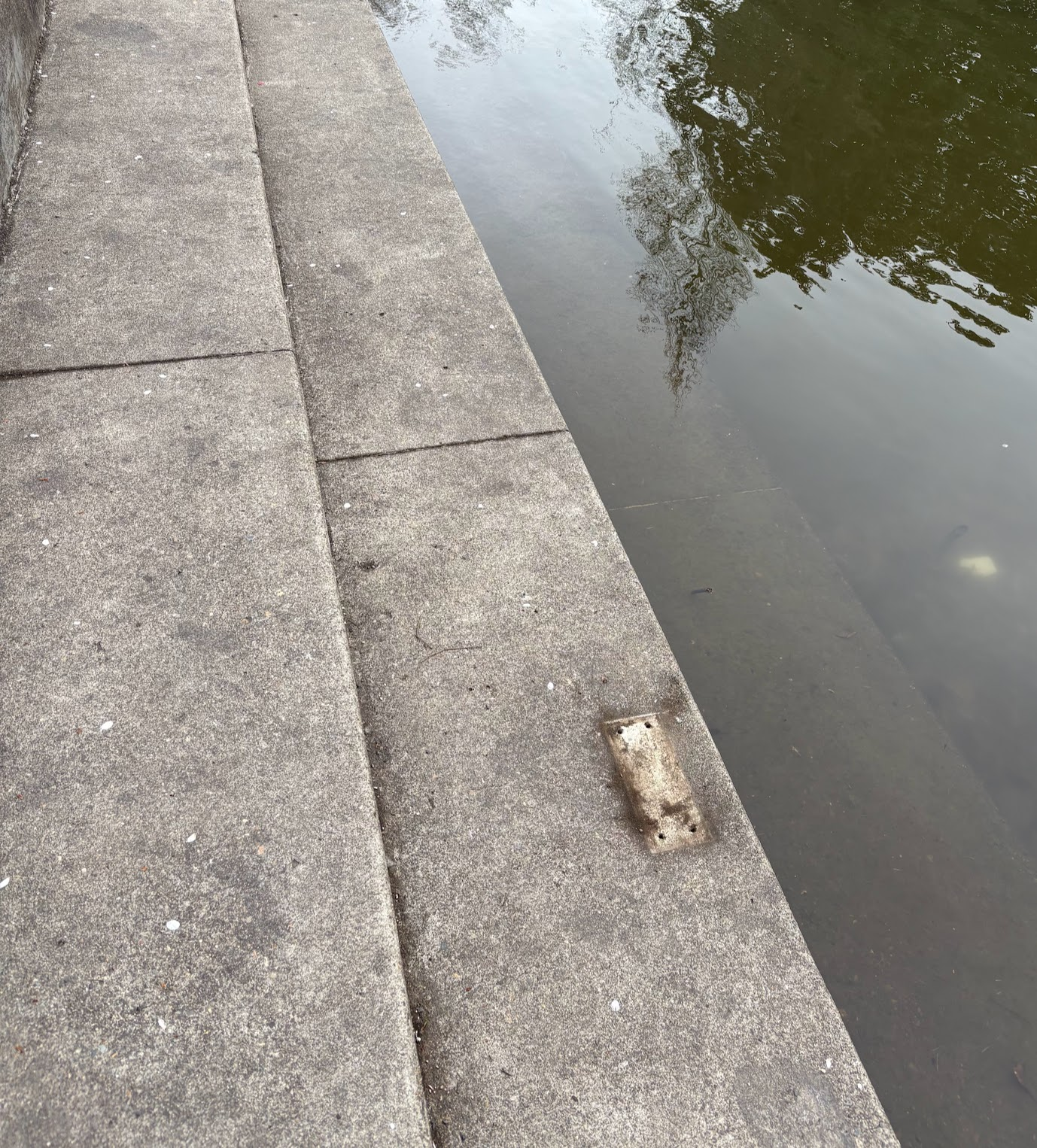
Millennium Plaza Park steps after sign removed in compliance with court ruling, 2025

Despite a decades-old status quo in which the Lake Oswego Corporation maintains that it owns the lake and has the authority to restrict access to it, in the 2010s, state and local law enforcement indicated that they consider the lake to be public and that they would not pursue charges against anyone for using it. As of 2012, local law enforcement was on the record saying the water is public property and that it was more likely to charge the corporation's security patrols with unlawful arrest than to cite swimmers or boaters for enjoying the water.

To control the waters, the corporation posted "no trespassing" signs and issued permits to select individuals who overcome various administrative hurdles. The corporation also regulates boat and operator licensing, water safety, and water quality, but those regulations may not be actually binding. With most land around the lake privately owned, and following a unanimous vote by the Lake Oswego City Council to bar entry to the lake from several lakefront parks, few people were able to test the authority of the corporation to enforce those regulations.

The ability of the corporation to restrict access to the water has been questioned on numerous occasions. According to a 2005 Oregon Attorney General opinion regarding the public's right to use navigable waterways in Oregon, the waters were thought to be publicly owned, though the ground beneath the lake is owned by the shareholders of the corporation, including 690 lakefront property owners and another 515 families who belong to one of 20 waterfront easement associations.

The corporation argued that the federal Water Resources Development Act of 1976 specifically classified the lake as non-navigable; therefore, the Attorney General opinion—which states that waterways over private land are only public if they are "navigable-for-public-use"—does not apply. The corporation also asserts that the lake is an artificially-expanded power reservoir and not a natural body of water.

In May 2012, a federal lawsuit was filed against the city of Lake Oswego to prevent it from limiting public access to the lake. The case was dismissed from federal court in October, with the judge indicating that the state of Oregon, due to its presumed ownership interest, should be able to weigh in on the case. The plaintiffs refiled in state court in November 2012, and in 2014, the judge ruled that the city had the right to block access. The Oregon Court of Appeals upheld the lower court ruling in 2017. The plaintiffs appealed to the Oregon Supreme Court, which agreed to hear the case in April 2018 to determine whether the lake is public and if the city can prohibit access.

In August 2019, the Oregon Supreme Court ruled partially in favor of the City of Lake Oswego and partially in favor of the plaintiffs, but remanded the case back to the trial court. The Court held that "if Oswego Lake is among the navigable waterways that the state holds in trust for the public, then neither the state nor the city may unreasonably interfere with the public’s right to enter the water from the abutting waterfront parks." In April 2022, the Clackamas County Circuit Court found in favor of the plaintiffs, ruling that the lake was navigable at the time of Oregon's statehood and thus subject to the public trust doctrine.

A second phase of the trial concluded in November 2024 and determined that the city's rules were not legal and must be changed to provide public access to the lake. The Lake Corporation planned to appeal. A subsequent order from the judge in March 2025 gave the city four months to remove the barriers that currently block access. Later that month, the Lake Oswego City Council voted to not join the Lake Corporation in appealing the ruling and indicated they would comply to remove barriers and establish safety rules for access.

== Lake health ==
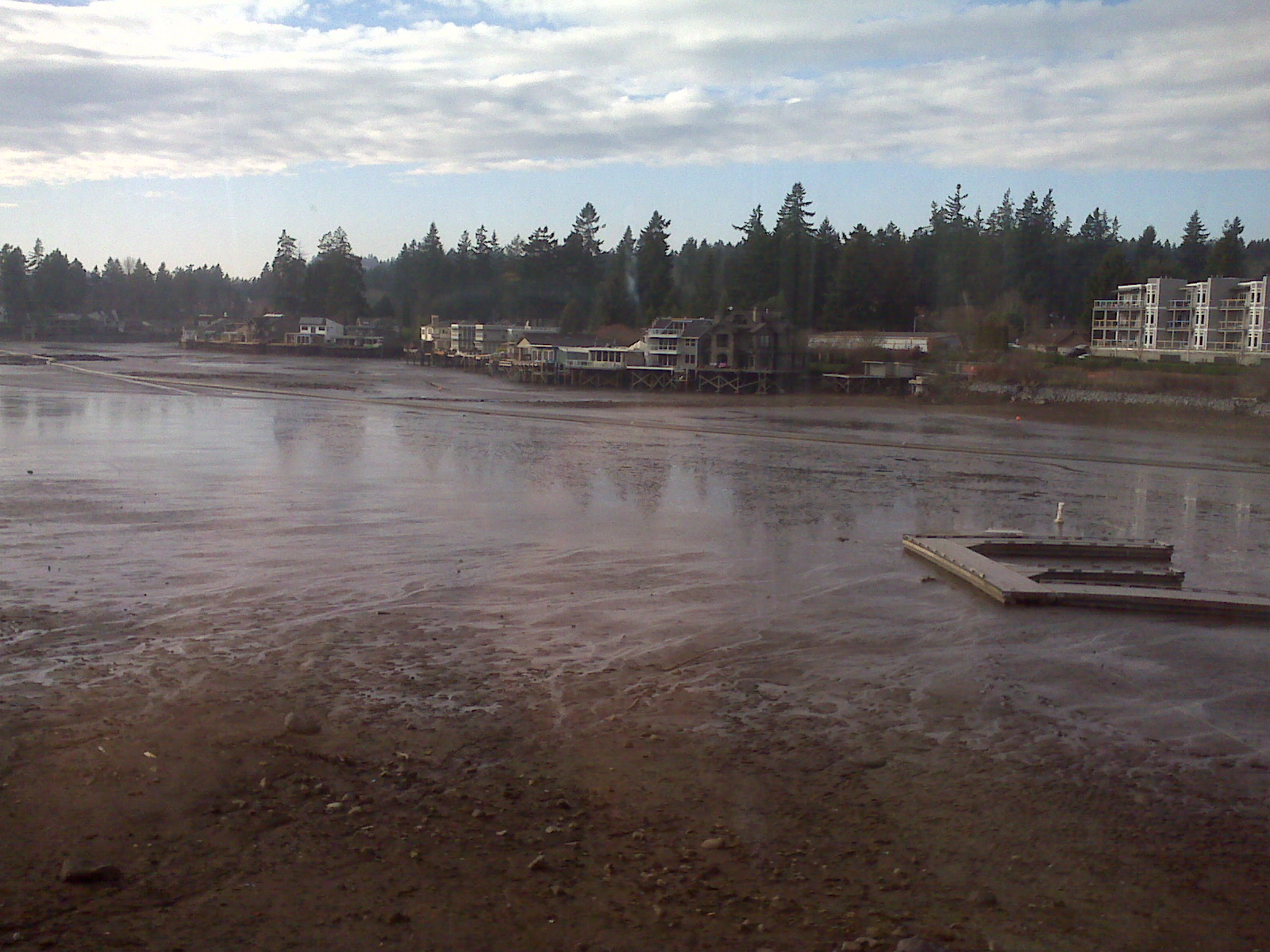
Lakewood Bay during 2010–2011 drawdown.

Periodically, the corporation lowers the water level in the lake by opening the dam to enable lakefront property owners to conduct repairs on docks and boathouses. In September 2010, the lake was drawn down approximately 24 feet (7.3 m) to allow replacement of an aging sewer pipe that traverses the lake, the lowest lake level since 1962 when the original sewer line was installed. The lake was refilled to its usual level in the summer of 2011. In recent years, the lake has experienced explosive algae growth, due in part to runoff from lawn fertilizer, which is rich in phosphorus.

== See also ==
- List of lakes of Oregon
