= Albert Alonzo Durham =

American miller who founded the city of Oswego, Oregon

- Born: March 15, 1814; New York State, U.S.
- Died: April 4, 1898 (aged 84); Washington County, Oregon, U.S.
- Resting place: Greenwood Hills Cemetery, Portland, Oregon, U.S.
- Occupation(s): Miller, Town founder
- Known for: Founder of Lake Oswego, Oregon, and namesake of Durham, Oregon
- Spouse: Miranda Almira White

Albert Alonzo Durham was an American miller who founded the city of Oswego, Oregon, which became Lake Oswego. He is also the namesake of Durham, Oregon.

== Early life ==
Durham was born in either Gaines, New York, or Oswego, New York, to Silas Durham and Laura Morse in 1814. Sometime before 1830, his family moved to Ohio where he married Miranda Almira White on November 6, 1836. They had three sons.

== Later life and career ==
In 1847, Durham and his family moved to Oregon and founded the town of Oswego, building a mill which became the town's first business. Oswego and the nearby community of Lake Grove combined in 1960 and became the city of Lake Oswego.

Around 1866, Durham sold his house and mill in Oswego, opting to build a sawmill and a flour mill next to Fanno Creek in Washington County. He owned this until his death in 1898.

Durham was buried at Greenwood Hills Cemetery in nearby Portland.

== Legacy ==
- City of Durham, Oregon, a town nearby his mill, was named after him during its incorporation in 1966.
- Durham Elementary School in Tigard, Oregon.
- Durham Road, a major thoroughfare in Tigard, Oregon.
