= George Rogers Park =

Public park in Lake Oswego, Oregon, U.S.

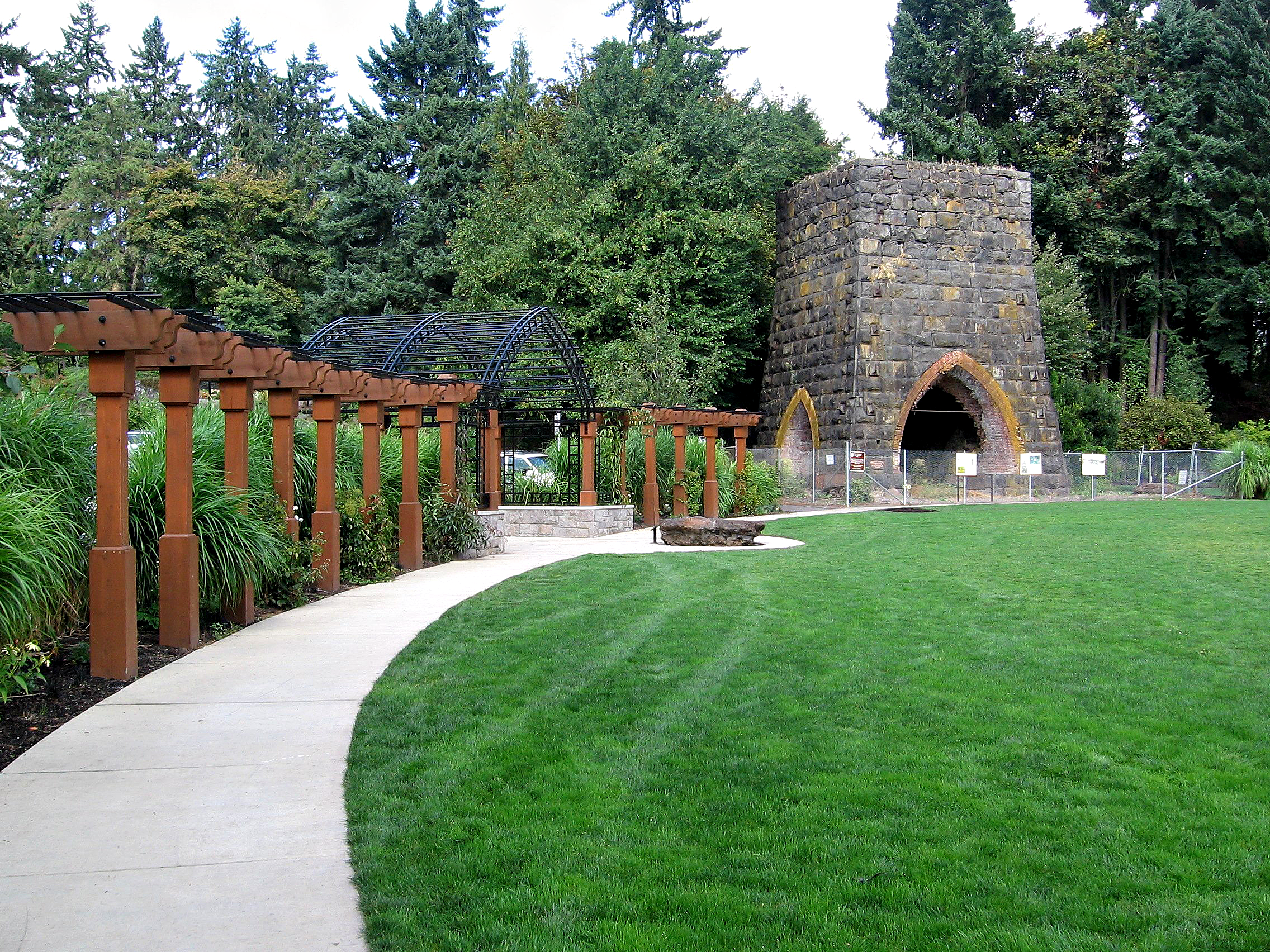
- The park’s Oregon Iron Company Furnace

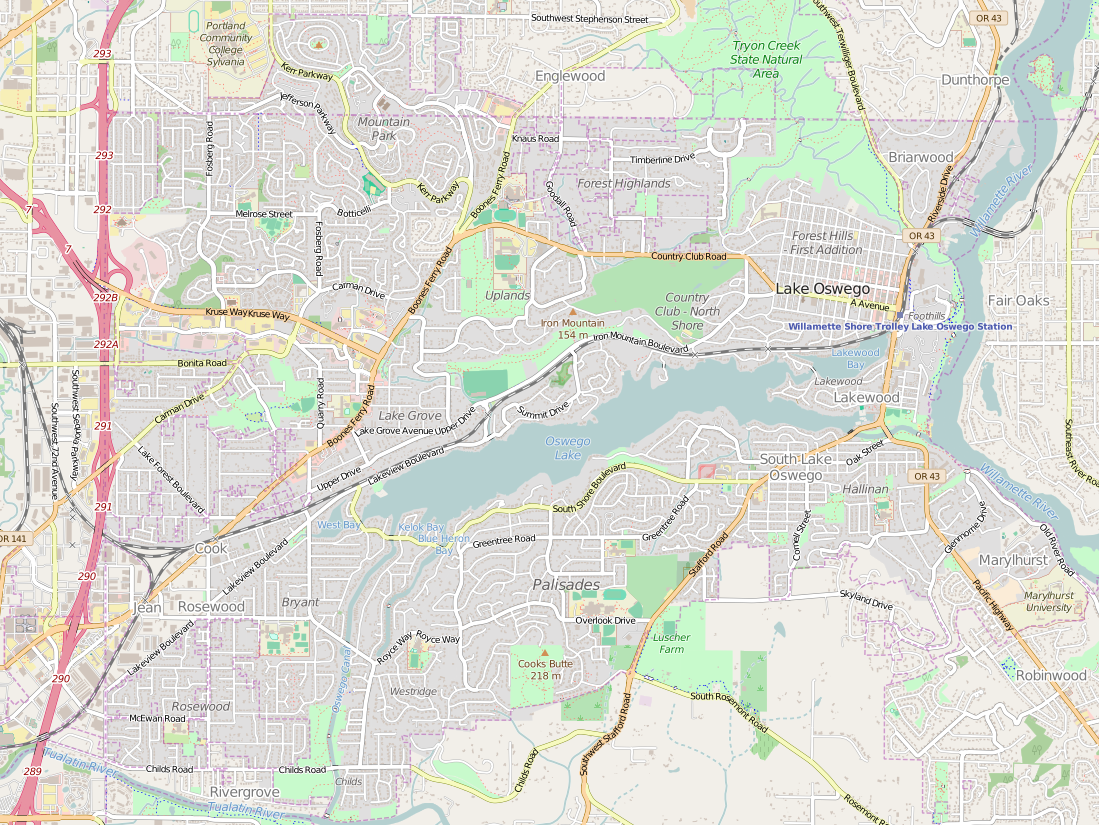
- Location within Lake Oswego OR
- Type: Municipal Park
- Location: 611 S. State Street, Lake Oswego, Oregon
- Coordinates: 45°24′42″N 122°39′48″W
- Area: 23 acres (9.3 ha)

George Rogers Park is a 26-acre (11 ha) public park at intersection of Ladd and South State streets in Lake Oswego, Oregon. This park contains two baseball fields, a soccer field, access to the Willamette River, a memorial garden area, restrooms, a playground, and two outdoor tennis courts. The park also features the Oregon Iron Company Furnace, which was placed on the National Register of Historic Places by the Department of the Interior. The park is named after George Rogers—a City Councilman—in appreciation for his devoted efforts to develop and maintain the grounds.

== History ==
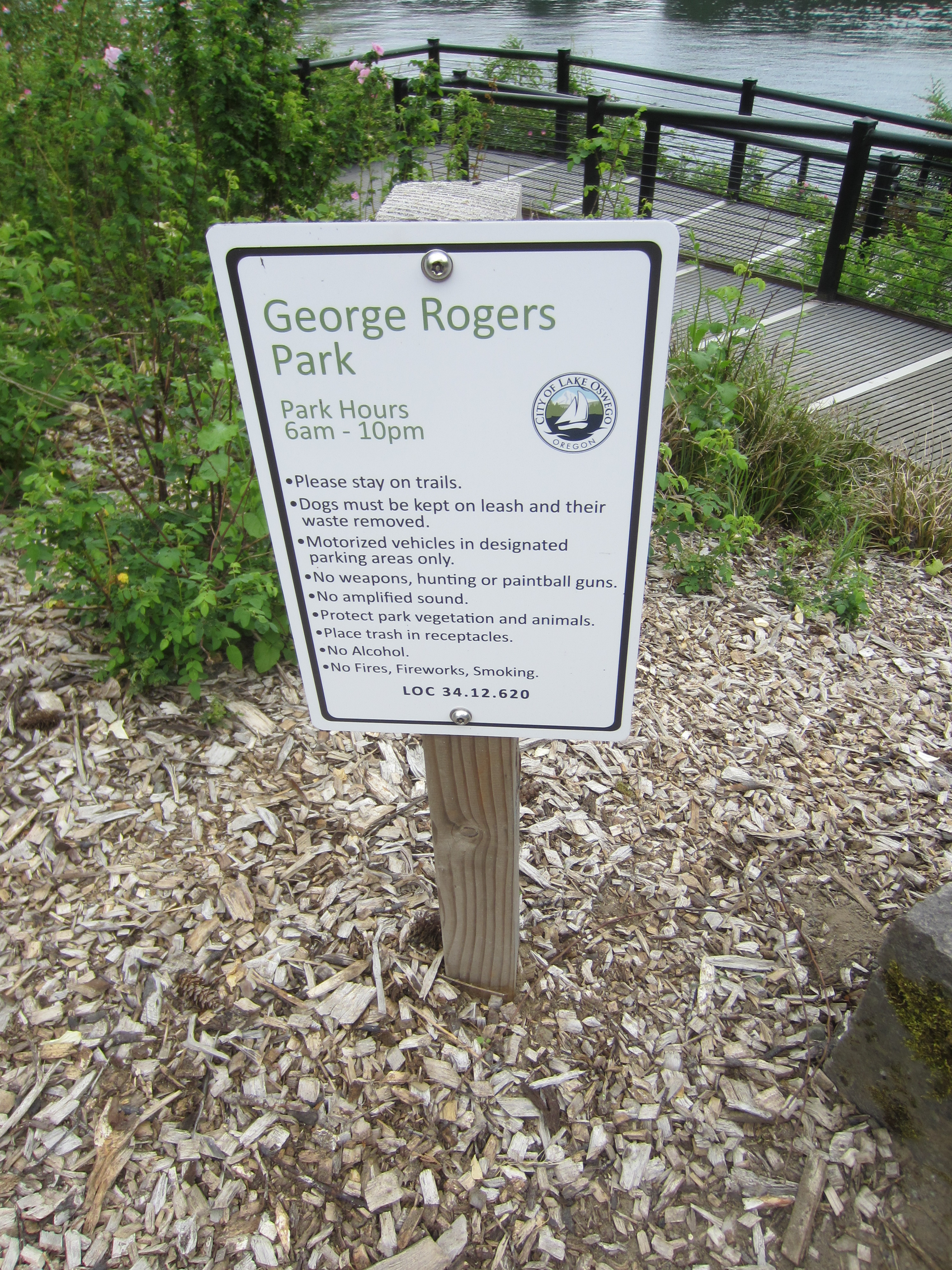
Signage for the park, 2018

George Rogers Park is Lake Oswego's first community park and one of its most diverse. Situated on the Willamette River, the park is the site of significant Native American activity over 10,000 years ago. In the early 19th century, the river landing at the mouth of Oswego Creek was a convenient camping place for explorers, fur traders, and pioneers. In the words of a Lake Oswego resident, it was "a stopping place, a sort of relay station for boats both large and small, plying up and down the river between Astoria and Champoeg."

in 1850, Albert Alonzo Durham and his wife Miranda filed a Donation Land Claim on 640 acres that included the river landing and the creek . Durham build a sawmill on the upper part of the creek and shipped lumber to San Francisco and the Sandwich Islands, now known as Hawaii. He founded a town on the bluff above the river and named it after Oswego, New York. The same features that attracted Durham to this spot made it an ideal location for an iron furnace. The lake provided waterpower and the landing provided access to shipping. The landing remained the town's transportation hub until the end of the steamboat era. For the next 60 years, the beach was an unofficial park where people launched boats, fished, swam, and picnicked. Every spring between 75 and 250 Gypsies arrived to camp beside the river for two to three weeks.

In 1945, the Oregon Iron and Steel Company sold the land that makes up the eastern portion of the park to the City of Lake Oswego. In 1949, landscaping work began in the park, conducted by the local Lake Oswego Garden Club.

In 1952, the park was renamed after George Rogers, a resident of Lake Oswego who immigrated from Madeira, Portugal. He served many years as a city council member, opened a local grocery store with his brother, and was a great driving force behind many of the early projects that formed what makes up George Rogers Park today.

The western portion of the park was sold to the City of Lake Oswego in 1955 by Clackamas County School District 7, with one of the requirements being the premised by maintained as a municipal park.

=== Oregon Iron Company ===
==== 1865–1877 ====
The Oregon Iron Company was established in 1865 by an elite group of Portland merchants who hailed from New England and New York. Their investments in shipping, railroads, gas and water systems, real estate, and banking shaped the future of Portland as the cultural and commercial center of Oregon. Controlling the means of iron production was part of their vision of a commercial empire in the Pacific Northwest. The first officers of the Company were William Sargent Ladd (President), Hermon C. Leonard (Vice President), and John Green (Secretary).

==== The Furnace ====
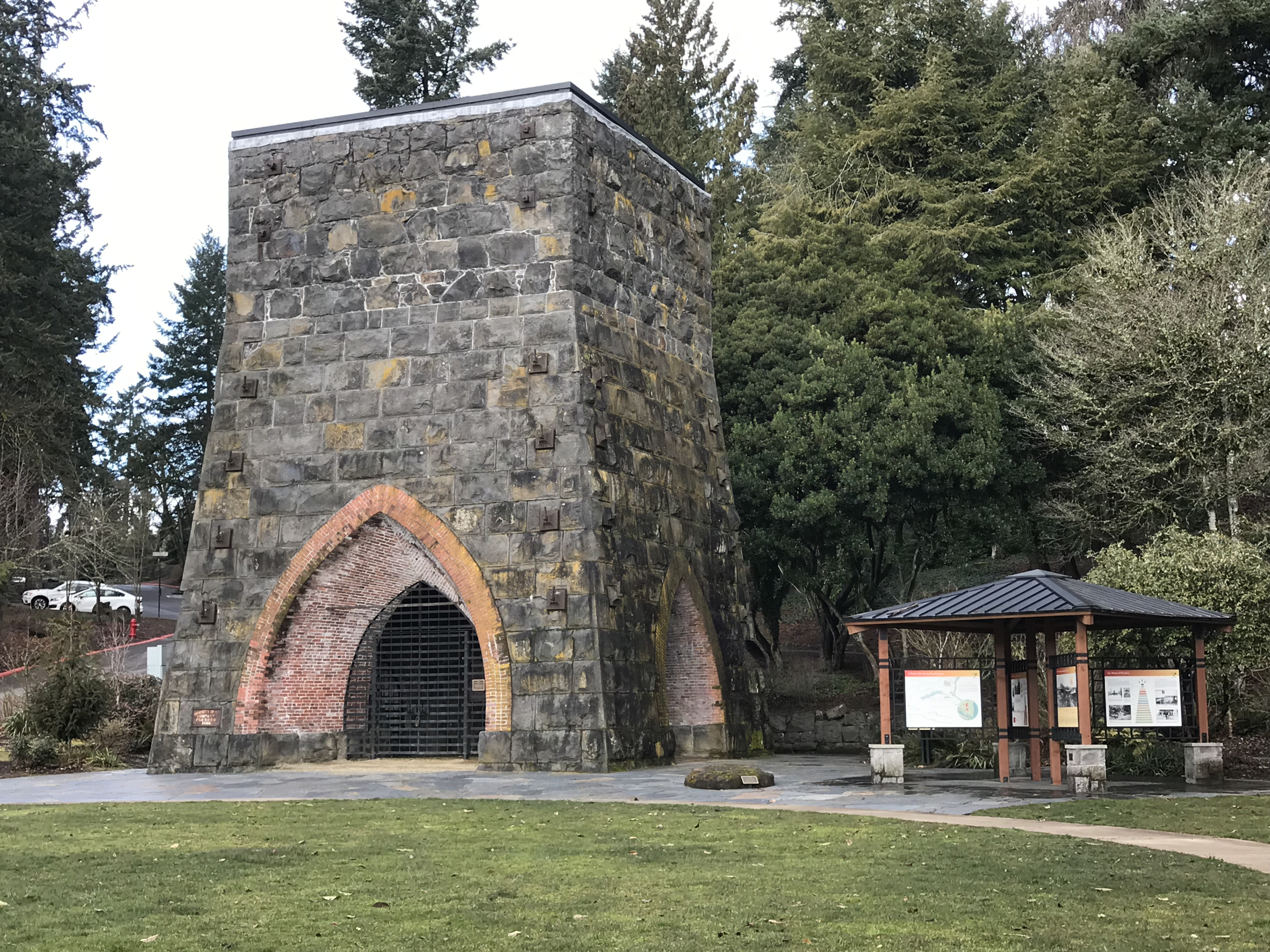
Iron Furnace (2019)

Ladd, Leonard, and Green then recruited George D. Wilbur, a furnace builder from Sharon, Connecticut, to oversee construction of the blast furnace. He modeled it on the furnaces of the Barnum Richardson Company base in Lime Rock, Connecticut. The result was a furnace with all the hallmarks of a Connecticut furnace- gothic arches, ashlar masonry of rectangular stone blocks, and a barrel-vaulted flue in back. Construction began in 1865 and was completed 10 months later. The furnace was blown in on August 24, 1867, amid high hopes that Oswego would become the "Pittsburg of the West." When the furnace was finished, newspapers from Portland to San Francisco hailed it as one of the most important undertakings on the Pacific Coast. "The success of this enterprise...opens to Oregon a new source of commerce and material wealth which can scarcely be over-estimated- vastly more beneficial and endurable in its results to the State than a mine of precious metals" (Portlands's Weekly Herald, July 28, 1866).

The Oswego Iron Furnace was the first blast furnace on the Pacific Coast and is the only surviving furnace west of the Rocky Mountains.

==== 1877–1894 ====
In 1877 the Oregon Iron Company was sold to its creditors, Samuel H. Brown, Jr. and Ernest W. Crichton. These men were experienced iron masters from Ohio's Hanging Rock Iron Region. They had been employees of the Oregon Iron Company, hired when the company sought knowledgeable iron masters to run the furnace. They incorporated the Oswego Iron Company in 1878 and made many improvements. Sadly, they too fell into debt and sold the company to their creditors, Simeon Gannett Reed, and Henry Villard.

Reed borrowed heavily from Villard to build a modern blast furnace, which opened in 1888 half a mile north of the old furnace. The new plant included the first pipe foundry west of St. Louis. The company looked poised to expand, however the economic crisis of 1893 dealt a fatal blow to the company, which had already been damaged by disputes among stockholders, competition from imported pig iron, and high labor costs. The furnace closed in 1894 and never reopened.

==== Lasting vestiges ====
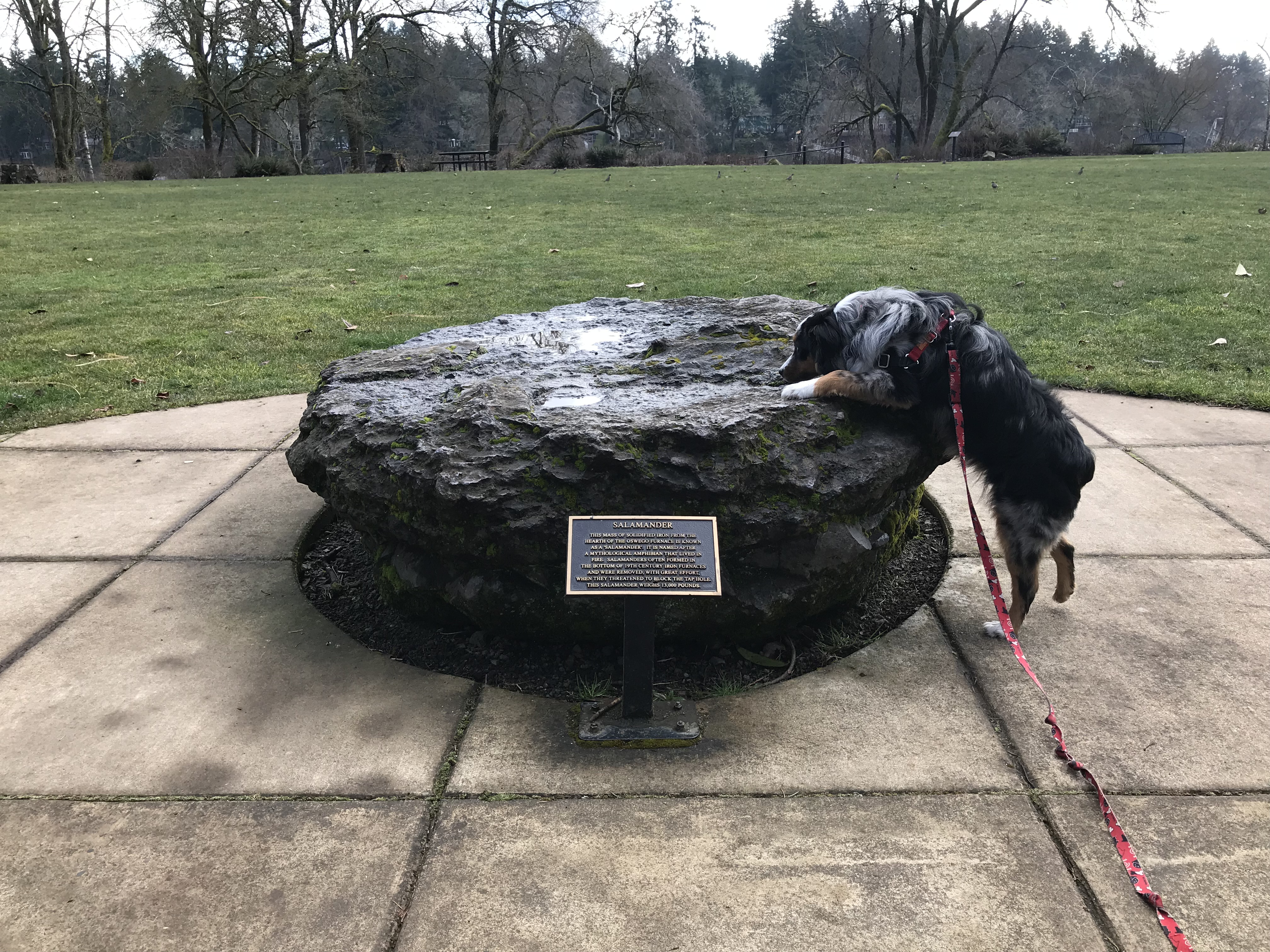
Iron "Salamander"

A massive 13,000 pound of solidified iron remains at the entrance to the lower park. This hunk of iron is known as a "Salamander" and was formed at the bottom of the iron furnace. These Salamanders had to be removed due to the fact that they threatened to block the tap hole and prevent further smelting.

== Rise and fall of Oregon Iron ==
This graph shows the production of Pig Iron in the 1800s from the Oregon Furnace in tons per year. Due to disputes over water rights, the furnace was forced to shut down until land rights were established in 74—as is evident by the production graph. The company struggled during 74–76 due to the depression, and did not produce at all in the 1877—the year the company was sold to Brown and Crichton. The company saw record production in 1888 when Simeon Reed was under control of the plant, but due to the combination of the panic of 1893, competitors in the industry, and rising labor costs the furnace was forced to close in 1894.

== Lower Oswego Creek Bridge ==
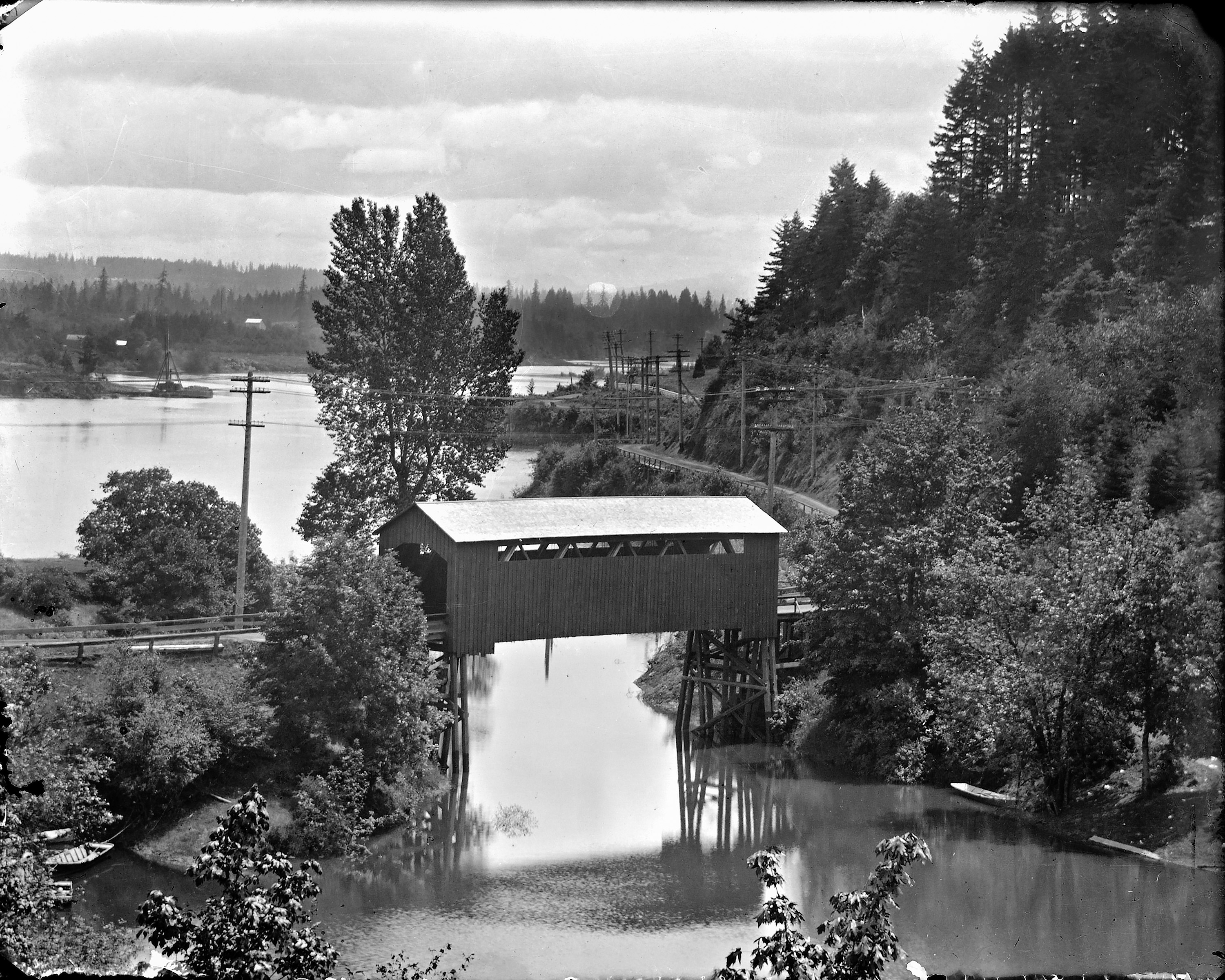
Old Oswego Creek Bridge

The lower Oswego Creek Bridge is built on the mouth of Oswego Creek adjacent to Oswego Landing - over four different bridges have been built here over the past 150 years. The earliest crossings gave travelers access to Old River Road on the west side of the Willamette River between Oswego and Willamette Falls. In the 1860s, a beam bridge invited foot, horse, and buggy traffic. in 1885 a hefty Howe truss Bridge stood parallel to the older beam structure and served the town's booming population and iron industry.

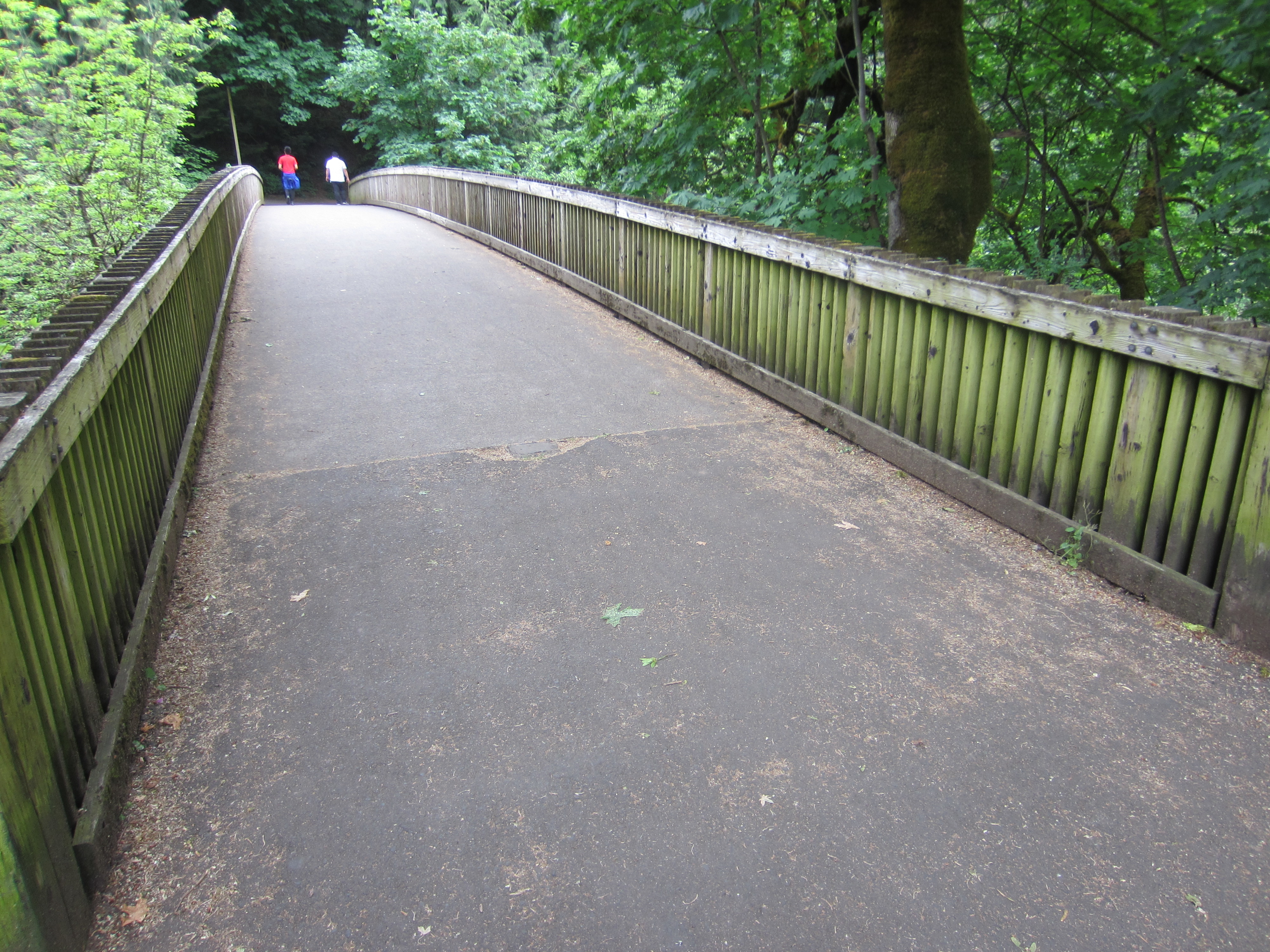
Current Oswego Creek Bridge

By 1911 the truss bridge was covered with a roof and walls for protection from the elements and remained in use until the concrete Pacific Highway Bridge of 1920 was completed. "Charcoal haulers would cross the covered bridge and follow the trail along the river..."(Mary Goodall, Oregon's Iron Dream). Thereafter, the covered bridge was used by those on foot until it rotted and collapsed in the 1930s. Following World War II a replacement was built and used until 1975 when it became unstable and was removed by the National Guard.
