= American Farm Bureau Federation =

Lobbying group in the United States

- Established: November 12, 1919; 106 years ago
- Founder: John Barron
- Type: Agricultural lobbying organization
- Purpose: Agriculture
- Location: Washington D.C.
- Region served: United States
- Method: Lobbying
- Key people: Vincent "Zippy" Duvall (President)
- Website: www.fb.org

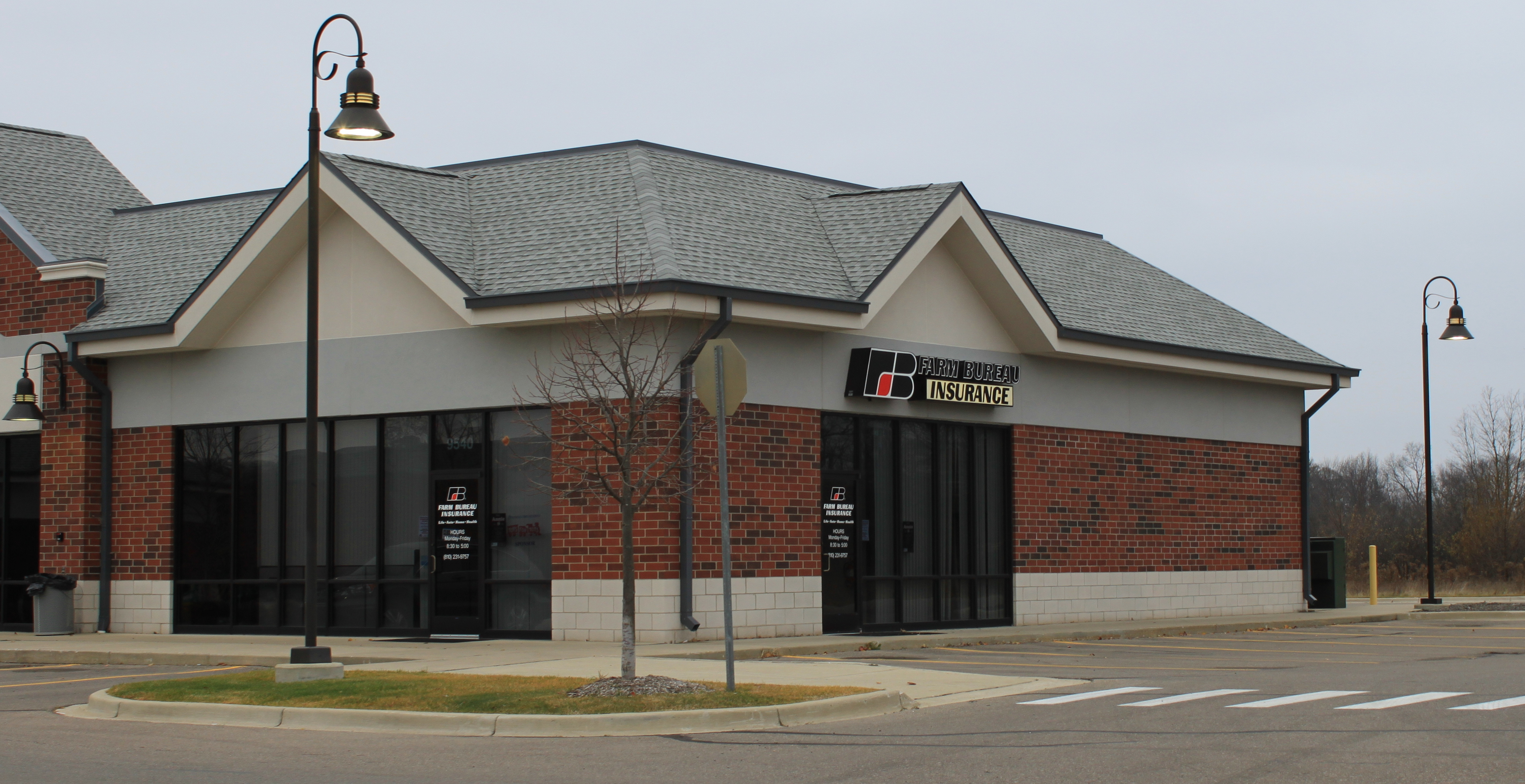
Farm Bureau office in Pinckney, Michigan

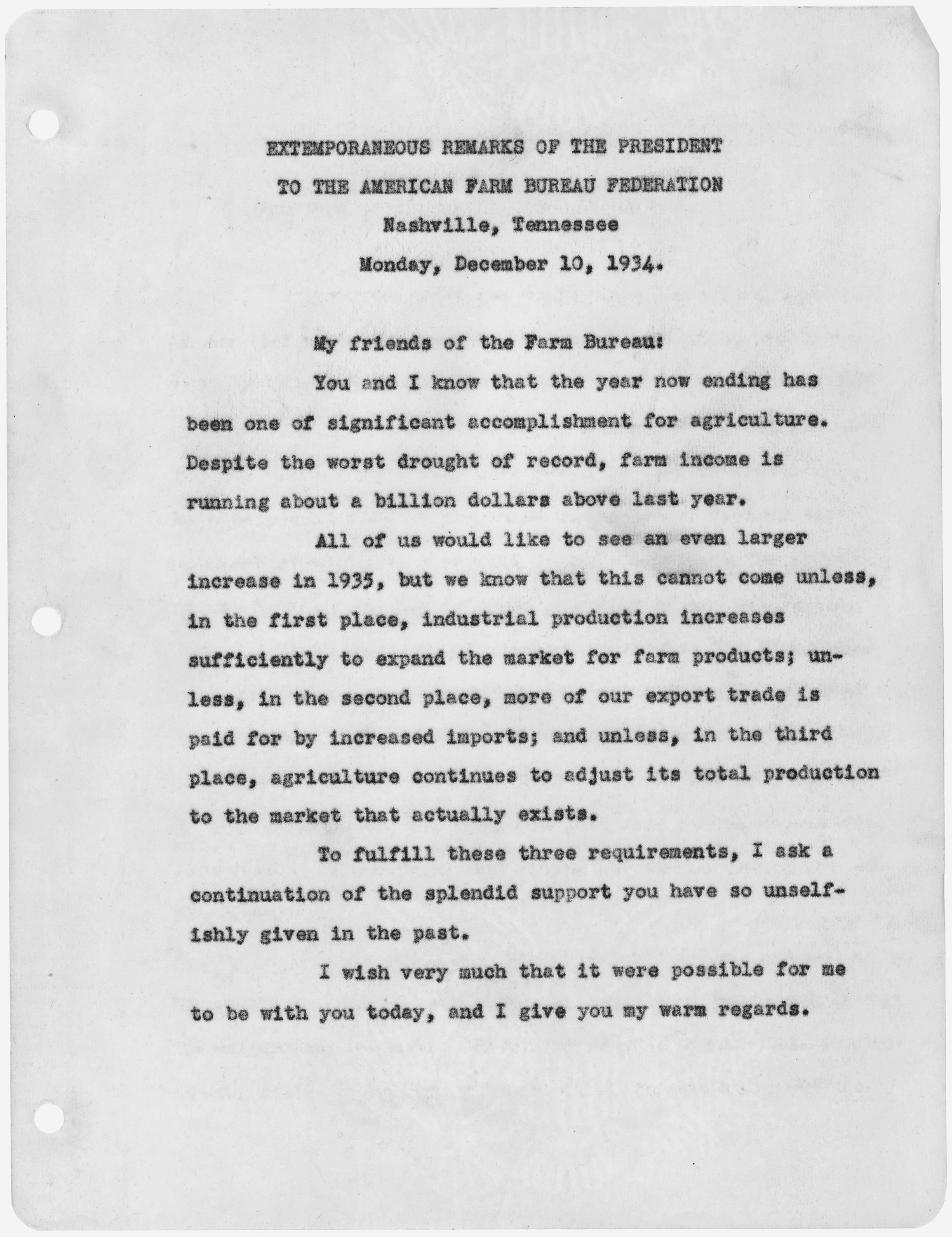
1935 FDR remarks for the American Farm Bureau Federation on agriculture during the Great Depression

The American Farm Bureau Federation (AFBF), more informally called the American Farm Bureau (AFB) or simply the Farm Bureau, is a United States–based 501(c)(5) tax-exempt agricultural organization and lobbying group. Headquartered in Washington, D.C., the Farm Bureau has affiliates in all 50 states and Puerto Rico. Each affiliate is a (state or county) Farm Bureau, and the parent organization is also often called simply the Farm Bureau.

Founded in 1919, the AFBF represents the 2 million farms in the United States, and is among the agriculture industry's largest lobby groups. Some observers contend that its federal lobbying efforts, which began in the 1930s, helped drive the subsequent three-decade shift to larger farms.

In 2022, the AFBF spent $2,120,000 on lobbying, including for policies benefitting the for-profit activities of state farm bureaus, such as federal subsidies for the crop insurance sold by affiliate companies. As early as the 1990s, the organization lobbied against climate policy in the United States, and until 2019, it denied that climate change was real.

AFBF itself does not sell insurance, but all but a handful of its non-profit state affiliates have affiliated for-profit insurance companies. Most of AFBF's revenue comes from dues paid by its nearly 5.9 million members, most of whom are not farmers but insurance customers who pay the dues as a condition of their policies.

Every year, the organization holds an annual convention and adopts new policies to guide its work. The convention is attended by farmer and rancher delegates from across the United States.

== History ==
The Farm Bureau movement started in 1911 when John Barron, a farmer who graduated from Cornell University, worked as an extension agent in Broome County, New York. He served as a Farm Bureau representative for farmers with the Chamber of Commerce of Binghamton, New York. The effort was financed by the U.S. Department of Agriculture and the Lackawanna Railroad. The Broome County Farm Bureau was soon separated from the Chamber of Commerce. Other farm bureaus later formed in counties across the U.S., as listed with dates at "List of Farm Bureaus".

In 1914, with the passage of the Smith–Lever Act of 1914, Congress agreed to share with the states the cost of programs for providing "county agents", who supplied information to farmers on improved methods of animal husbandry and crop production developed by agricultural colleges and experiment stations, which has evolved into the modern-day Cooperative Extension Service.

In 1915, farmers meeting in Saline County, Missouri, formed the first statewide Farm Bureau.

=== 1919–1929 ===
In 1919, a group of farmers from 30 states gathered in Chicago. They founded the American Farm Bureau Federation with the goal of "speaking for themselves through their own national organization". But they also sought to forestall populist organization of small farmers. "The inception of this national farm bureau association is taking place at a most opportune time," Harvey J. Sconce, president of the Illinois Agricultural Association, said at the meeting. "The United States is at present experiencing the greatest period of industrial unrest in its entire history. It is now just one year since the signing of the armistice. During this interval more than 3,000 strikes have been inaugurated in this country. Is it any wonder that production has dwindled and cost of living has so greatly increased? It is our duty in creating this organization to avoid any policy that will align organized farmers with the radicals of other organizations. The policy should be thoroughly American in every respect – a constructive organization instead of a destructive organization." Wrote Brian Campbell, now a professor at Berry College: "Farm Bureau began as a counter-move to various farm organizations that represented small farmers."

The initial organization papers said:

The purpose of Farm Bureau is to make the business of farming more profitable, and the community a better place to live. Farm Bureau should provide an organization in which members may secure the benefits of unified efforts in a way that could never be accomplished through individual effort.

— The statement originally approved by Farm Bureau members in 1920.

The initial local and state farm bureaus (1910s–1940s) had a social and educational function furthering the extension service efforts, and they also pursued the functions of pooled negotiating power for purchasing of supplies such as seed and equipment (comparable in that respect to farm co-operatives, but with potential for larger/wider unification). The bureaus also pooled capability to provide fire insurance and vehicle insurance for their farms, via both negotiating power (in group purchasing of insurance) and self-insuring capability (in forming new insurance companies of their own); they were comparable in that respect to mutual insurance companies (and indeed founded various such companies). In all of these functions, local and state farm bureaus thus became an analogue of a farmers' union or a trade association for farmers in the United States; the National Farmers Union was the other such effort, outside of small co-ops. More precisely, the local and state farm bureaus formed a network of such unions or associations with a national parent organization. They were thus somewhat analogous in that respect to a federation of trade unions (such as the AFL–CIO) – but with individual family farms being self-employed, the parallel with trade associations is the more relevant analogy.

=== 1930–1939 ===
In the 1930s, the American Farm Bureau Federation developed a lobbying presence in Washington, D.C., where it pushed for changes in New Deal programs to favor large farms with many employees over family farms. Meanwhile, the Minnesota Farmer–Labor Party (FLP), a political party which represented small operators and favored radical programs, was left without power by the New Deal policies, and so in the 1940s the FLP and similar groups in the upper Midwest died or were merged into the Democratic or Republican parties.

Along with the U.S. Department of Agriculture, the Farm Bureau and other "advocates of a mechanized, highly commercialized agriculture helped initiate an abrupt two-decade shift to machines and wage labor." By World War II, the organization was "the most influential representative of large farmers."

In a study of the organization's New Deal period during the 1930s, Christian McFayden Cambell concluded that it was "...largely controlled from the top. Its leadership is self-perpetuating, and its policy, although nursed through an elaborate procedural labyrinth, is rarely permitted to wander very far afield. 'The Farm Bureau's cherished belief that its policy was made at the grass roots and adopted by democratic process turned out to be partly illusion,' concluded Christiana McFayden Cambell in her study of the organization's New Deal period. There appears to be no reason to change that assessment today," Samuel R. Berger wrote in Dollar Harvest (2nd ed., 1978).

=== Since 2000 ===
By the 21st century, the AFBF, through its state and local affiliates, was entwined financially with large agribusiness corporations. "In recent years, its insurance affiliates have bought stock in companies like Cargill, ConAgra, Dow Chemical, DuPont, Tyson and Archer Daniels Midland, all major food industry players. The Southern Farm Bureau Annuity Insurance Co. [co-owned by 10 state Farm Bureaus] once owned more than 18,000 shares of Premium Standard stock," The Nation wrote in 2012.

Bob Stallman, a Texan, served as AFBF president from 2001 to 2016, earning a salary of $832,216 in his final year. Duval took over in January 2017, earning a salary of $648,111 in his first year.

In 2020, around 500 dairy farmers and haulers received letters demanding repayment (for up to $50,000) for milk shipped to Dean Foods, just before the company filed for bankruptcy (it was subsequently acquired by Dairy Farmers of America). AFBF, which called the demands a "predatory shakedown", was one of several groups that provided legal assistance to the farmers and haulers.

In 2023, AFBF announced several memorandums of understanding with equipment manufacturers, establishing repair agreements that make manufacturers' tools, software, and manuals available to farmers under "fair and reasonable" terms so farmers can make needed repairs. Under these, AFBF also agrees not to lobby on right to repair legislation, and to “encourage state-level Farm Bureaus to recognize the commitments made in the MOU and refrain from promoting “right to repair” legislation at the state or federal level”. In January, MOUs were signed with John Deere and in March, with CNH Industrial, Case IH and New Holland Agriculture.

== Lobbying ==
A 2012 investigation by The Nation detailed the large-scale federal and state political operations of the Farm Bureau, and alleged the Bureau recruited political candidates (mostly Republicans) to affect legislative elections and appointments to state committees.

As of 2012, the organization retains 22 registered lobbyists. From 2002 to 2012, the Farm Bureau spent $16 million, which was 45% of the total amount spent by the 10 largest agribusiness interests in the U.S.

The Farm Bureau supported the Fighting Hunger Incentive Act of 2014 (H.R. 4719; 113th Congress), a bill that would amend the federal tax laws to permanently extend and expand certain expired provisions that provided a bigger tax deduction for businesses that donated food to charitable organizations. The Farm Bureau argued that without the tax write-off, "it is cheaper in most cases for these types of businesses to throw their food away than it is to donate the food".

The Farm Bureau has lobbied for increases in federal subsidies for crop insurance, which "is a small, but significant piece of Farm Bureau insurance companies’ portfolio. In 2011, they collected over $300 million in crop insurance premiums", The Nation wrote in 2012.

=== Climate change ===
The Farm Bureau has long opposed regulation or taxation of greenhouse gases and climate policy, justifying its actions by denying the scientific consensus on climate change. "For decades, the Farm Bureau has derailed climate action, deploying its political apparatus and 6 million members in a forceful alliance with conservative groups and the fossil fuel industry," Inside Climate News wrote in 2018.

Starting in the 1990s the organization participated in the Global Climate Coalition, which lobbied in opposition to the Kyoto Protocol.

In 2003, Farm Bureau economists joined the Heartland and Hudson Institutes in publishing a paper that "called state or federal regulation of greenhouse gases 'unnecessary, enormously expensive, and particularly injurious to the agricultural community.'"

In 2010, the Farm Bureau's official position was that "there is no generally agreed upon scientific assessment of the exact impact or extent of carbon emissions from human activities, their impact on past decades of warming or how they will affect future climate changes". The climate change session at the Farm Bureau's national meeting that year was entitled "Global Warming: A Red Hot Lie?" It featured Christopher C. Horner, a climate change denier and lawyer for the libertarian Competitive Enterprise Institute, a largely industry-backed group that strongly opposes limits on greenhouse gases. At the meeting, delegates unanimously approved a resolution that "strongly supports any legislative action that would suspend EPA's authority to regulate greenhouse gases under the Clean Air Act". Right before the meeting, the Union of Concerned Scientists sent the group a letter pointing out that its climate change position runs counter to that of every major scientific organization and urged it to support action on climate change. U.S. Secretary of Agriculture Tom Vilsack said that farmers have more to gain from cap and trade than they stand to lose.

By 2019, the Farm Bureau had ceased to publicly deny climate change, but remained opposed to non-market-based solutions, including opposing taxes on carbon uses or emissions. Politico called it a “longtime, powerful foe of federal action on climate."

==== Food and Agriculture Climate Alliance ====
In 2020, the Farm Bureau became one of four co-founders of the Food and Agriculture Climate Alliance (FACA), a coalition of groups advocating for voluntary, incentive-based and market-oriented programs in the food and agriculture sector to respond to climate change. The coalition's website says its 80-plus member organizations represent "farmers, ranchers, forest owners, agribusinesses, manufacturers, the food and innovation sector, state governments, sportsmen, and environmental advocates", who cooperate to "develop and promote shared climate policy priorities across the entire agriculture, food and forestry value chains. While The New Republic reported in 2022 that the organization "wants guarantees that farmers will get paid for soil sequestration without anything else in agricultural business-as-usual changing", FACA has called for “a comprehensive effort involving financial and technical assistance, research investments, proactive response to innovation, public-private partnerships, and a commitment to equitable opportunities for all producers” to further reduce greenhouse gas emissions.

In 2022, FACA and AFBF supported the Senate's passing of the Growing Climate Solutions Act. In February 2023, FACA released policy recommendations for the 2023 farm bill, calling for voluntary bipartisan climate solutions. The recommendations included incentives for farmers to plant cover crops and use precision agriculture equipment that more efficiently uses fertilizers and pesticides; a USDA grant program to improve soil health; a study to look for barriers to climate-smart practices in the crop insurance program; and changes to income limits so that all farmers can participate in “landscape level projects” to advance conservation and climate goals.

=== 2012 Farm Bill ===
The AFBF was heavily involved in lobbying for the 2012 farm bill, which included $9 billion in federal subsidies for crop insurance.

=== Animal welfare ===
In 2022, the Farm Bureau joined the National Pork Producers Council in petitioning the Supreme Court of the United States to overturn California's Prevention of Cruelty to Farm Animals Act in National Pork Producers Council v. Ross.

=== WOTUS ===
In 2023, AFBF was one of several organizations to legally challenge the new Waters of the United States rule.

== Insurance ==
In addition to its political lobbying, the Farm Bureau is "a multi-billion dollar network of for-profit insurance companies" and the third-largest insurance group in the United States, The Nation wrote in 2012. Although AFBF itself does not sell insurance, all but a handful of its non-profit state affiliates have affiliated for-profit insurance companies. Most of these companies were founded by the state Farm Bureaus and retain "Farm Bureau" in their corporate names; some use the NFBF logo. "In many states, Missouri among them, members of the Farm Bureau board and the board of its affiliated insurance company are one and the same, sharing office buildings and support staff," The Nation wrote.

In many states, the non-profit state Farm Bureau owns the affiliated for-profit insurance company. FBL Financial Group, for example, was established in 1939 as Farm Bureau Mutual Insurance Company by the Iowa chapter of the Farm Bureau. Through expansion and mergers, FBL has grown to operate in 14 states, generally selling to consumers under the name Farm Bureau Financial Services. In 2022, it had profits of $72.51 million on revenues of $732.3 million. Its parent, the Iowa Farm Bureau, reported 2020 revenue of about $100 million and an investment portfolio worth more than $1 billion, while executive compensation was in the high six figures."

Similarly, Nationwide Mutual Insurance Company began as an insurance company for members of the Ohio Farm Bureau Federation and today serves as an insurance provider to Farm Bureaus in nine states. Farm Family Insurance, founded in 1955 by Farm Bureaus of several northeastern states, had 2000 revenues of $313 million and assets of more than $1.3 billion. Country Financial, founded by the Illinois Farm Bureau in 1925, served clients in 17 states as of 2017.

"The Farm Bureau has many for-profit interests outside of traditional farming," 60 Minutes' Mike Wallace reported in 2000. "Its Iowa chapter alone owns and operates a $3.5 billion insurance and financial services company that is traded on the New York Stock Exchange. That company, FBL Financial Group, gave thousands of stock options to its directors, including the presidents of 14 state Farm Bureaus." Ed Wiederstein, president of the Iowa Farm Bureau and chairman of FBL Financial, cashed in a "couple of hundred thousand bucks from stock options" in 1998.

=== American Agricultural Insurance Company ===
The American Agricultural Insurance Company was formed in 1948 as a capital stock company. It is owned by the “insurance company affiliates of various state Farm Bureau insurance companies and by AFBF.”It was reincorporated in 1954, and became a mutual carrier under the name American Agricultural Mutual Insurance Company, and then was reincorporated again in 1968 as a capital stock company under its current name.

The Farm Bureau also owns crop insurer American Farm Bureau Insurance Services, formed in 1995. AAIC began selling crop insurance in 1997. In 1999, the AAIC purchased Nationwide-Re as part of its plan to expand into Non-Farm Bureau premium writings. The AAIC is a reinsurer primarily assuming business from Farm Bureau insurance companies.

The company’s bylaws require its board of directors to include the president of the Federation and designated shareholders that are “affiliated with a state Farm Bureau organization that is a member of AFBF.”

Similarly, AFBF president Zippy Duval simultaneously serves as president and chairman of the board of American Agricultural Insurance Company, whose directors are the presidents of 16 of the state Farm Bureaus. Its common stock is held by AFBF (443 shares in 2018) and various state Farm Bureau insurance companies (a total of 265,830 shares in 2018); it is unclear who owns its premium stock, which has a par value ten times that of the common stock. In 2021, AAIC reported total assets of $1.8 billion (up from $1.35 billion in 2018), premiums of $464 million (up from $328 million in 2018), and cash on hand of $120 million.

These kinds of ties can create conflicts of interest. "Nonprofit executives are supposed to operate in the best interest of the nonprofit, not themselves. But, by not taking salaries and having their income tied to FBL’s performance, the [Iowa] Farm Bureau’s executives open themselves up to questions," wrote Investigate Midwest, an independent, nonprofit newsroom.

The AFBF and its affiliated insurance companies are entwined in other ways as well. Most of the people it claims as "members" are not farmers but insurance customers: "In many states, anyone who signs up for Farm Bureau insurance becomes a member of the Farm Bureau automatically, which explains why the American Farm Bureau Federation boasts 6 million members when the United States has only about 2 million farmers." Sometimes annual-dues-paying membership in a state Farm Bureau is required to purchase the insurance; sometimes the insurance companies pay the state or county Farm Bureau a fee per member to access their contact information for marketing purposes. In 2019, AFBF collected $28.4 million in member dues, which accounted for more than three-quarters of its total revenue of $37.6 million.

== List of state Farm Bureaus ==
| Bureau | Headquarters | Founded | Insurance | 2020 revenue |
|---|---|---|---|---|
| Alabama Farmers Federation | Montgomery, Alabama | 1921 | Alfa Insurance | $12,262,248 |
| Alaska Farm Bureau | | | | $204,776 |
| Arizona Farm Bureau | Gilbert, Arizona | | FBL Financial Group | $2,940,400 |
| Arkansas Farm Bureau Federation | Little Rock, Arkansas | 1935 | Southern Farm Bureau Casualty Insurance Company; Southern Farm Bureau Life Insurance Company | $16,138,909 |
| California Farm Bureau Federation | Sacramento, California | 1919 | Allied/Nationwide | $22,463,907 |
| Colorado Farm Bureau | Centennial, Colorado | 1919 | Southern Farm Bureau Casualty Insurance Company; Southern Farm Bureau Life Insurance Company | $2,717,640 |
| Connecticut Farm Bureau | Wethersfield, Connecticut | 1919 | Nationwide | $391,630 |
| Delaware Farm Bureau | Camden, Delaware | | Nationwide | |
| Florida Farm Bureau | Gainesville, Florida | 1941 | Southern Farm Bureau Casualty Insurance Company; Southern Farm Bureau Life Insurance Company | |
| Georgia Farm Bureau Federation | Macon, Georgia | 1937 | Georgia Farm Bureau Mutual Insurance Company; Southern Farm Bureau Life Insurance Company | |
| Hawaii Farm Bureau Federation | Honolulu, Hawaii | 1948 | | |
| Idaho Farm Bureau Federation | Pocatello, Idaho | 1939 | Farm Bureau Mutual Insurance Company of Idaho FBL Financial Group | |
| Illinois Farm Bureau | Bloomington, Illinois | 1916 | Country Financial | |
| Indiana Farm Bureau | Indianapolis, Indiana | 1919 | Indiana Farm Bureau Insurance | |
| Iowa Farm Bureau | West Des Moines, Iowa | 1918 | FBL Financial Group | |
| Kansas Farm Bureau | Manhattan, Kansas | 1919 | FBL Financial Group | |
| Kentucky Farm Bureau | Louisville, Kentucky | 1919 | Kentucky Farm Bureau Insurance; Southern Farm Bureau Life Insurance Company | |
| Louisiana Farm Bureau Federation | Baton Rouge, Louisiana | 1922 | Southern Farm Bureau Casualty Insurance Company; Southern Farm Bureau Life Insurance Company | |
| Maine Farm Bureau | Augusta, Maine | 1951 | Farm Family | |
| Maryland Farm Bureau | Davidsonville, Maryland | 1915 | Nationwide | |
| Massachusetts Farm Bureau Federation | Marlborough, Massachusetts | | Farm Family | |
| Michigan Farm Bureau | Lansing, Michigan | 1919 | Farm Bureau Insurance of Michigan | |
| Minnesota Farm Bureau | St. Paul, Minnesota | 1919 | FBL Financial Group | |
| Mississippi Farm Bureau Federation | Jackson, Mississippi | 1922 | Southern Farm Bureau Casualty Insurance Company; Southern Farm Bureau Life Insurance Company | |
| Missouri Farm Bureau | Jefferson City, Missouri | 1915 | Missouri Farm Bureau Insurance | |
| Montana Farm Bureau Federation | Bozeman, Montana | 1919 | Mountain West Farm Bureau Insurance; FBL Financial Group | |
| Nebraska Farm Bureau | Lincoln, Nebraska | | FBL Financial Group | |
| Nevada Farm Bureau | Sparks, Nevada | | Country Financial | |
| New Hampshire Farm Bureau Federation | Concord, New Hampshire | | Farm Family | |
| New Jersey Farm Bureau | Trenton, New Jersey | | Farm Family | |
| New Mexico Farm & Livestock Bureau | Las Cruces, New Mexico | | FBL Financial Group | |
| New York Farm Bureau | Albany, New York | 1911 | Nationwide | |
| North Carolina Farm Bureau | Raleigh, North Carolina | 1936 | North Carolina Farm Bureau Insurance Group; Southern Farm Bureau Life Insurance Company | |
| North Dakota | Fargo, North Dakota | 1942 | Nodak Mutual Insurance Company FBL Financial Group | |
| Ohio Farm Bureau | Columbus, Ohio | 1919 | Nationwide | |
| Oklahoma Farm Bureau | Oklahoma City, Oklahoma | 1942 | Oklahoma Farm Bureau Insurance FBL Financial Group | |
| Oregon Farm Bureau | Salem, Oregon | 1932 | Country Financial | |
| Pennsylvania Farm Bureau | Camp Hill, Pennsylvania | | Nationwide | |
| Puerto Rico Farm Bureau | San Juan, Puerto Rico | | | |
| Rhode Island Farm Bureau | Johnston, Rhode Island | | Farm Family | |
| South Carolina Farm Bureau | Cayce, South Carolina | 1944 | Southern Farm Bureau Casualty Insurance Company; Southern Farm Bureau Life Insurance Company | |
| South Dakota Farm Bureau | Huron, South Dakota | 1917 | FBL Financial Group | |
| Tennessee Farm Bureau | Columbia, Tennessee | 1921 | Tennessee Farmers Insurance Companies; Farm Bureau Health Plans | |
| Texas Farm Bureau | Waco, Texas | 1933 | Texas Farm Bureau Insurance; Southern Farm Bureau Life Insurance Company | |
| Utah Farm Bureau | Sandy, Utah | 1916 | FBL Financial Group | |
| Vermont Farm Bureau | Richmond, Vermont | 1915 | Nationwide | |
| Virginia Farm Bureau | Goochland County, Virginia (Richmond mailing address) | | Virginia Farm Bureau Insurance; Southern Farm Bureau Life Insurance Company | |
| Washington State Farm Bureau | Lacey, Washington | 1920 | Country Financial | |
| West Virginia Farm Bureau | Buckhannon, West Virginia | 1919 | Nationwide | |
| Wisconsin Farm Bureau Federation | Madison, Wisconsin | 1919 | Rural Mutual Insurance; FBL Financial Group | |
| Wyoming Farm Bureau Federation | Laramie, Wyoming | 1920 | Mountain West Farm Bureau Insurance; FBL Financial Group | |

== See also ==
- National Farmers Union (United States)
- National Grange of the Order of Patrons of Husbandry
- National Farmers Organization
