= FBL Financial Group =

American financial services company

- Type: Private
- Industry: Life insurance, Annuities, Settlement options
- Founder: Farm Bureau
- Headquarters: West Des Moines, Iowa, United States
- Number of locations: Arizona, Idaho, Iowa, Kansas, Minnesota, Montana, Nebraska, New Mexico, North Dakota, Oklahoma, South Dakota, Utah, Wisconsin, Wyoming
- Key people: Craig D. Hill (Chairman), Daniel D. Pitcher (CEO),
- Products: Farm Bureau Financial Services, Farm Bureau Property & Casualty Insurance Company
- Revenue: US$719,64 million (2018)
- Operating income: US$105,89 million (2018)
- Net income: US$93,79 million (2018)
- Total assets: US$9,833 billion (2018)
- Total equity: US$1,184 billion (2018)
- Number of employees: 5,600
- Subsidiaries: Farm Bureau Life Insurance Company and FBL Holdings
- Website: fblfinancial.com

FBL Financial Group, Inc. is a financial services holding company, headquartered in West Des Moines, Iowa, and traded on the New York Stock Exchange under the symbol FFG.

Its primary operating subsidiary, Farm Bureau Life Insurance Company, underwrites and markets a broad range of life insurance and annuities to individuals and businesses. These products are distributed by multiline exclusive Farm Bureau agents, principally under the consumer brand name Farm Bureau Financial Services. In addition, FBL manages all aspects of two Farm Bureau-affiliated property-casualty insurance companies for a fee.

== History ==
The company traces its history to the Great Depression in the 1930s, when the Iowa chapter of the Farm Bureau established Farm Bureau Mutual Insurance Company in 1939 to sell insurance to farmers.

Farm Bureau Life Insurance Company was founded as Iowa Life Insurance Company on October 30, 1944, and opened for business in 1945.

Over the years, various state Farm Bureaus merged their insurance company operations into the company.

In July 1996, FBL Financial Group was listed on the New York Stock Exchange at a split-adjusted initial public offering price of $8.75.

In 2003, one of FBL's primary operating subsidiaries, EquiTrust Life Insurance Company, began selling single premium deferred annuity products nationally through independent marketing companies. The following year, it began selling indexed annuity products. In 2011, FBL sold EquiTrust Life to a controlled affiliate of Guggenheim Partners.

In 2018, FBL Financial Group incorporated FBL Holdings as a standalone subsidiary, a diversified asset fund that specializes in digital assets management and securities.

On November 18, 2019, FBL appointed Daniel D. Pitcher CEO to replace Jim Brannen.

FBL's quarter-century as a publicly traded company ended in 2021, when Farm Bureau Property & Casualty Insurance Company (FBPCIC) bought all the Class A and Class B common stock that neither FBPCIC nor the Iowa Farm Bureau Federation already owned. On May 25, 2021, FBPCIC announced that it had bought up the remaining shares for $61 apiece in cash.

== States served ==
- Iowa (entered 1939)
- Nebraska (entered 1951)
- Minnesota (entered 1954)
- Utah (through merger 1984)
- South Dakota (through merger 1987)
- Wisconsin (through merger 1994)
- Arizona (through merger with Western Farm Bureau Life, 1994)
- Idaho (through merger with Western Farm Bureau Life, 1994)
- Montana (through merger with Western Farm Bureau Life, 1994)
- New Mexico (through merger with Western Farm Bureau Life, 1994)
- Oklahoma (through merger with Western Farm Bureau Life, 1994)
- North Dakota (through merger with Western Farm Bureau Life, 1994)
- Wyoming (through merger with Western Farm Bureau Life, 1994)
- Kansas (through merger 2001)
