= Century Farm =

North American heritage designation

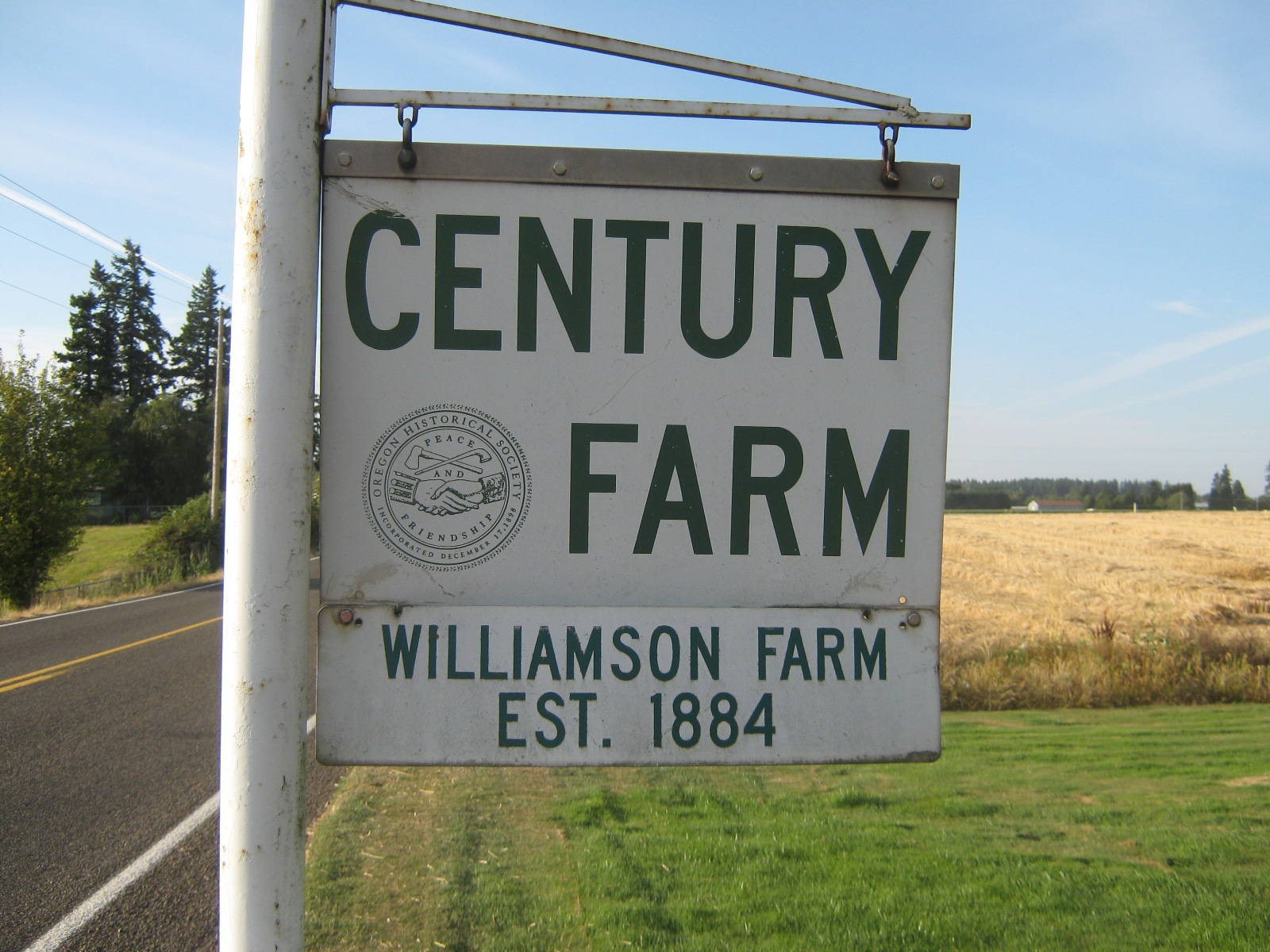
A century farm sign for Williamson Farm in Oregon, United States (Founded in 1889; 137 years ago)

A Century Farm or Centennial Farm is a farm or ranch in the United States or Canada that has been officially recognized by a regional program documenting the farm has been continuously owned by a single family for 100 years or more. Some regions also have Sesquicentennial Farm (150 years) and Bicentennial Farm (200 years) programs.

In most states and provinces, the essential requirement for the award is that the property must have remained in the same family continuously for 100 years or more and currently be a working farm or ranch. Some states stipulate a minimum number of acres or annual agricultural sales.

== Background ==
=== Canada ===
In Canada, Century Farm recognition in the province of Ontario was initiated as a Canadian Centennial project of the Junior Farmers' Association of Ontario (JFAO) in 1967. In Alberta the Alberta Century Farm & Ranch Award is administered by the Ministry of Agriculture and Rural Development and similar programs are run by individual counties and municipalities.

=== United States ===
In the United States, one of the first organizations to begin officially recognizing the farms was the New York State Agricultural Society in 1937. Several states began their programs during the United States Bicentennial in 1976. Recognition from state to state varies. It is usually handled by the state's agriculture or natural resources department in conjunction with the American Farm Bureau Federation and the Cooperative extension service of the United States Department of Agriculture, or the state's historical society. In other states, civic groups such as the Knights of Ak-Sar-Ben perform the function. The awards are frequently done at the state fair.

The award typically defines a farm as 40 acres (16 ha) or more and consists of a plaque and a sign as well as formal listing.

In Oregon, in addition to century farms and ranches, the Department of Agriculture began to recognize sesquicentennial farms and ranches in 2008.

State	Program	Founded	Min. acres	Oversight	Notes
Alabama	Century and Heritage Farm ProgramBicentennial Farm program	1976	40	Alabama Department of Agriculture and Industries	Alabama's Century and Heritage Farm program has recognized more than 700 farms across the state. Century Farms have been owned by the same family for at least one-hundred years with current agricultural activity. A Heritage Farm has been a working family farm for at least one-hundred years, has interesting and important agricultural and historical aspects, and one or more historical structure (at least 40 years old). The Bicentennial Farm program was established in 2017 to honor farms that have played a significant role in Alabama history and have been in opposition for at least 200 years. As of June 2026 only 17 farms have received this designation
Arkansas	Arkansas Century Farm Program	2012	10	Arkansas Agriculture Department	
California	CACenturyFarms	2018	N/A	Private entity	
Colorado	Centennial Farms	1986	160	History Colorado	
Connecticut	Century Farm Award	2011		Connecticut Agricultural Information Council	
Delaware	Century Farm Program	1987	10	Delaware Department of Agriculture	
Florida	Century Pioneer Family Farm Program	1985		Florida Department of Agriculture and Consumer Services	To qualify, a farm must be owned by a family for at least 100 continuous years.
Georgia	Centennial Farms	1993	10	Historic Preservation Division, Georgia Department of Natural Resources, in cooperation with the Georgia Farm Bureau Federation; the Georgia Department of Agriculture; the University of Georgia College of Agricultural and Environmental Sciences; the Georgia Forestry Commission; and the Georgia National Fairgrounds and Agricenter	
Idaho	Century Farm and Ranch Program	1972	40	Idaho State Historical Society	
Illinois	Centennial and Sesquicentennial Farms	1972		Illinois Department of Agriculture	
Indiana	Hoosier Homestead Award Program	1976	20	Indiana State Department of Agriculture	
Iowa	Century Farms	1976		Iowa Department of Agriculture and Land Stewardship	
Kansas	Century Farms	2000	80	Kansas Farm Bureau	
Kentucky	Historic Farms Program	1992		Kentucky Heritage Council and the Kentucky Department of Agriculture	
Louisiana	Louisiana Century Farm Program		20	Louisiana State University Agricultural Center, Louisiana Department of Agriculture and Forestry, Louisiana Farm Bureau Federation, and Louisiana Land Bank	
Maryland	Century Farm Award		10	Maryland Department of Agriculture	
Massachusetts	Massachusetts Century Farms			Massachusetts Farm Bureau Federation	To qualify, a farm must have been in the same family for 100 years or more and is currently being farmed.
Michigan	Centennial Farms	1948	10	Historical Society of Michigan	
Minnesota	Century and Sesquicentennial Farms	1976		Minnesota Farm Bureau	
Mississippi	Centennial Farm Program			Mississippi Department of Agriculture and Commerce	
Missouri	Century Farm Program	1976	40	University of Missouri Extension	
Montana	Centennial Farm and Ranch Program	2009		Montana Historical Society	
Nebraska	Pioneer Farm Family Awards	1961 (approx.)		Knights of Ak-Sar-Ben Foundation, Nebraska Farm Bureau	
Nevada	Centennial Ranch and Farm Awards Program	2004	160	Agricultural Council of Nevada, Nevada Agricultural Foundation, Cattlemen's Association, Nevada Farm Bureau, Heritage Foundation, U.S. Department of Agriculture, USDA Natural Resources Conservation Service	
New Hampshire	Century Farm Book	2016		New Hampshire Farm Bureau Federation	
New Jersey	Century Farm Award			New Jersey Agricultural Society	To qualify, a farm must have been in the same family and been operational for at least 100 years.
New York	Century Farm Award	1937		New York State Agricultural Society	
North Carolina	Century Farm Family Program	1970		North Carolina Department of Agriculture and Consumer Services	
North Dakota	Centennial Farms	1988		Lewis and Clark Fort Mandan Foundation	
Ohio	Century Farms	1993		Ohio Department of Agriculture	Also has a Bicentennial Farm program. Not to be confused with Ohio Bicentennial barns; see Barn advertisement.
Oklahoma	Centennial Farm and Ranch Program	1993	40	Oklahoma State Historic Preservation Office, Oklahoma Historical Society, Oklahoma Department of Agriculture	
Oregon	Century Farm and Ranch Program	1958		Oregon Agricultural Education Foundation, Oregon Farm Bureau, Oregon State Historic Preservation Office, Oregon Department of Agriculture, Oregon Travel Information Council	Also has a Sesquicentennial Farm program
Pennsylvania	Century and Bicentennial Farm Program	1937	10	Pennsylvania Department of Agriculture	
South Carolina	South Carolina Century Farms Program	1974		Pendleton District South Carolina	
South Dakota	Century Farms	2000	80	South Dakota Department of Agriculture	Also has a Quasquicentennial (125 years) Farm program
Tennessee	Century Farms	1975	10	Center for Historic Preservation at Middle Tennessee State University, formerly Tennessee Department of Agriculture	Also recognizes Pioneer Century Farms (established in or before 1796), and African American Century Farms (farms founded by emancipated slaves and their children)
Texas	Family Land Heritage Program	1974	10	Texas Department of Agriculture	
Utah	Century Farms & Ranches	1995		Utah Department of Agriculture and Food	Nearly 500 farms have been recognized.
Vermont	Vermont Century Farms Program	1953		Vermont State Grange and Vermont Farm Bureau	
Virginia	Virginia Century Farm Program	1997		Virginia Department of Agriculture and Consumer Services	There are 1,332 Virginia Century Farms.
West Virginia	West Virginia Century Farm Program	2015	10	West Virginia Association of Conservation Districts	
Wisconsin	Century and Sesquicentennial Farm and Home Program	1948			8,583 century farms or homes 616 sesquicentennial farms or homes
Wyoming	Centennial Farm and Ranch program	2006 (reestablished)	160	Wyoming State Historic Preservation Office, Wyoming Department of Agriculture, Wyoming Stock Growers Association, Wyoming Wool Growers Association, Wyoming Rural Electric Association	
