= Augustus Fanno Farmhouse =

Historic house in Oregon, United States

- U.S. National Register of Historic Places
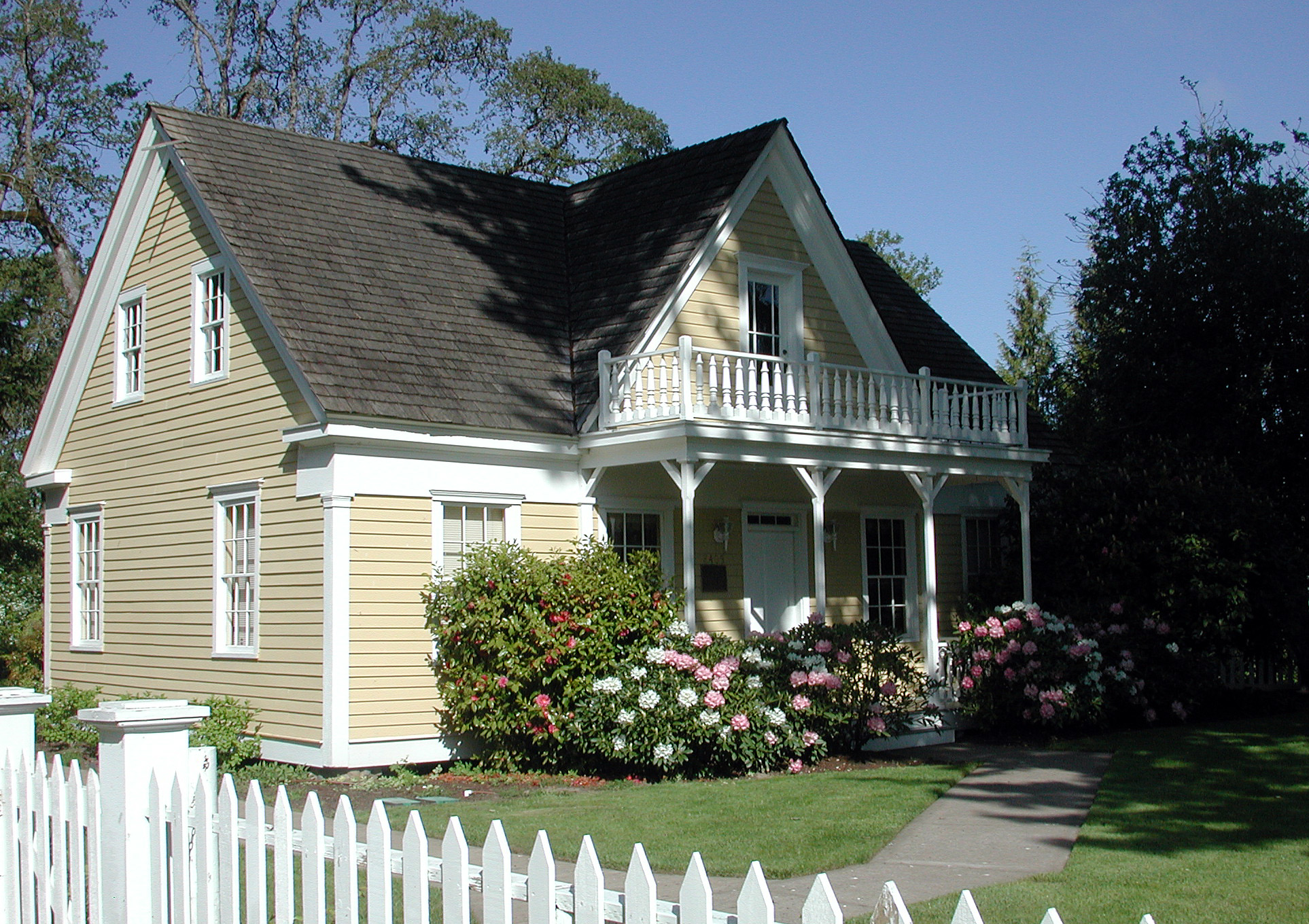
- Fanno Farmhouse

- Location within Oregon Location within the United States
- Interactive map showing the location of Augustus Fanno Farmhouse
- Location: 8405 Southwest Creekside Place, Beaverton, Oregon
- Nearest city: Portland
- Coordinates: 45°27′31.89″N 122°47′35.42″W
- Area: 0.87 acres (3,500 m^{2})
- Built: 1859; 167 years ago
- Architect: Augustus Fanno
- Architectural style: Mid-19th century revival
- NRHP reference No.: 84003103
- Added to NRHP: April 5, 1984; 42 years ago

The Augustus Fanno Farmhouse was the home of Augustus Fanno, one of the first European American settlers in what became Washington County in the U.S. state of Oregon. Born in Maine in 1804, Fanno lived in Missouri as a young adult and in 1846 moved to Oregon with his first wife, Martha, and son. After Martha died in childbirth in Linn City in the Willamette Valley, Fanno and his son settled a 640-acre (2.6 km^{2}) donation land claim 12 miles (19 km) to the northwest on a small tributary of the Tualatin River. It was the first such claim to be filed in the county.

In 1851, Fanno married Rebecca Denney, and the first of their six children was born later that year. In 1859, he designed and built a rural home in the modified New England revival style popular in Oregon at the time. The family pioneered the cultivation of onions in Oregon, and by the 1890s these became regionally recognized for their high quality. Fanno descendants produced onions on the farm until onion maggots drove them out of business in the 1940s. Members of the family occupied the farmhouse until 1974, and in March 1982 they donated the house and adjacent land to the Tualatin Hills Park & Recreation District (THPRD).

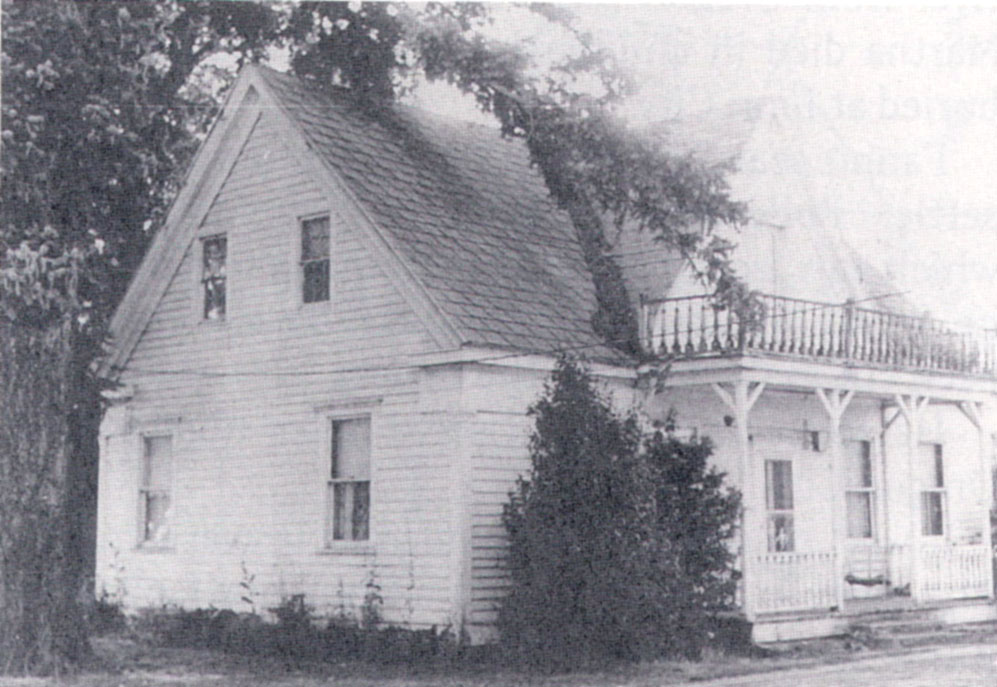
A historic image of the farmhouse

Fanno Farmhouse remains on its original site along Fanno Creek in the Portland, Oregon, suburb of Beaverton. Restored by THPRD, the house is on the National Register of Historic Places, was honored as a significant historical site by Tualatin Valley Heritage, has been named a Century Farm, and was nominated for the 1985 Griffin Cabin Award by the Washington County Historical Society.
