= Florida Farm Bureau =

Farm advocacy group in Florida

- FFB offices in Tallahassee, Florida
- Formation: November 15, 1941; 84 years ago
- Founder: American Farm Bureau Federation
- Type: Non-profit 501(c)(5)
- Registration no.: 59-0642950
- Legal status: active
- Headquarters: 5700 SW 34th Avenue, Gainesville, Florida
- Coordinates: 29.5980°N 82.3673°W
- President: Jeb Smith
- Website: https://floridafarmbureau.org/
- Formerly called: Florida Citrus Growers, Inc.

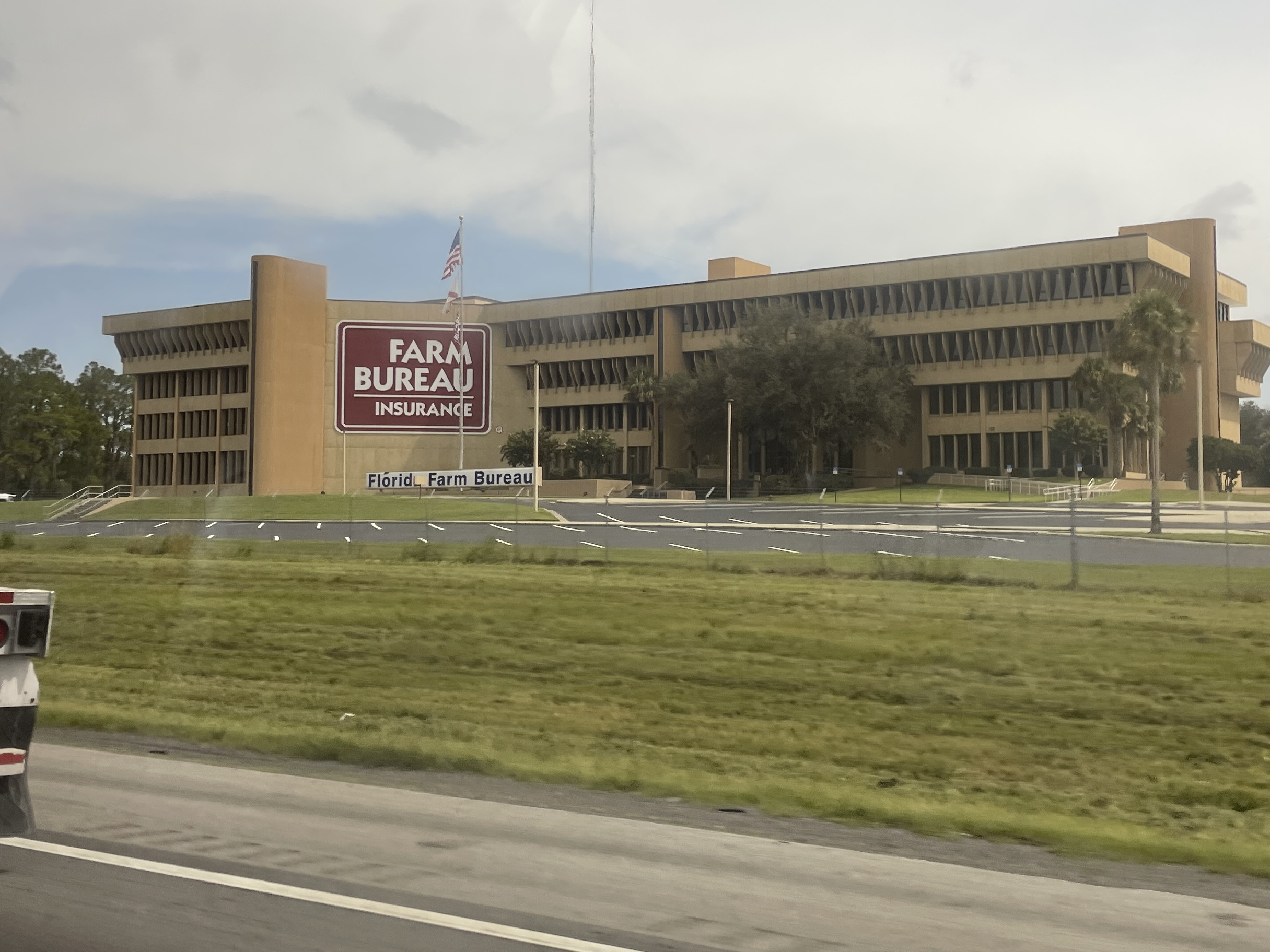
FFB headquarters in Gainesville, Florida

The Florida Farm Bureau (FFB), also known as the Florida Farm Bureau Federation, is a Florida-based non-profit organization that is "dedicated to supporting Florida farmers, ranchers, and rural communities". Its goals are to increase the net income of farmers and ranchers, improve the quality of rural life, and advocate for agriculture in Florida.

It is a member of American Farm Bureau Federation (AFBF), which represents the FFB nationally.

== History ==
The farmers that survived the Great Depression were generally poor. In the late 1930s, the price of grapefruit was 5¢ per box and the shippers dictated when they would accept citrus for transit. In an attempt to regain some control, six influential growers founded Florida Citrus Growers, Inc. That effort proved ineffective, so they wrote to the American Farm Bureau Federation for help. The AFBF was founded in Chicago by farmers from 30 states who gathered in 1919. An AFBF representative was dispatched to Florida, and he attended the next Florida Citrus Growers meeting, explaining how the Farm Bureau organization works. A meeting was scheduled for all farmers in Orlando and the AFBF President "Cap'n Ed" O'Neal presented the plan. The entity, Florida Citrus Growers was replaced by the Florida Farm Bureau Federation, an AFBF affiliate. Their charter contained these goals:

- Provide an identity for Florida's farmers that is "special".
- Improve marketing methods, stabilize markets, promote better cultivation practices, improve product quality.
- Provide representation in the Florida Legislature.
- Provide farmers with market and agricultural data.
- Start Farm Bureaus in every county.

The first FFB convention was held in November 1941, attended by approximately 100 farmers who elected FFB's first president. A goal of signing 500 members was established before the FFB would be recognized by the AFBF. Almost 200 joined that day. Dade County was the first county farm bureau formed four months later. At the first anniversary in Miami, there were Farm Bureaus in 17 counties with membership of 1,180. Women got involved with the Social and Education Committee, later called the Farm Bureau Women's Committee. The women worked to improve education, establish lockers for frozen food in their communities, expand rural electrification, telephone and health care. FFB's goals in 1945 still have relevance today: refund of gasoline tax for off-road use; poultry disease research; advertising for Florida citrus; Cooperative Extension Service support; protection of fresh water resources. Insurance coverage was offered to farmers in northern Florida.

The five-story, 227,417-square-foot (21,127.7 m^{2}) FFB corporate office building in Gainesville, Florida is visible from Interstate 75. It was constructed in 1973 and has a full-service cafeteria and meeting room. It is three miles from the Institute of Food and Agricultural Sciences (IFAS) at the University of Florida. There were approximately 53 "home office" employees at that location. It also contains the state headquarters of the Florida Future Farmers of America organization.

== Membership ==
There are Farm Bureaus in 60 of the 67 counties of Florida, which FFB says constitutes their "grassroots" structure. The organization claims over 133,000 member-families, but the total number of farms in Florida is 44,703, according to the 2022 Census of Agriculture. The purchase of Farm Bureau Insurance requires continued membership in Florida Farm Bureau, $50/year. The company website states, "As a member benefit, Florida Farm Bureau offers both its farmer and rancher and consumer members an array of insurance services through Florida Farm Bureau Insurance." Since there are three times as many member-families as farms, the majority of Farm Bureau members are consumer members whose membership fees and commitment help Florida Farm Bureau achieve its purpose.

== Member Benefits ==
- Discounts on lodging, car rentals, vacation planning, equipment, attraction tickets, truck purchase, propane gas, hearing aids
- Farm Bureau Life insurance, Casualty insurance, Banking service, Mortgages, Financial services
- Free agriculture publications, no trespassing signs, notary service, agriculture classes

=== Weather ===
The Florida Automated Weather Network (FAWN) is a weather station network depicting conditions on agricultural (rural) land throughout the state. The 42 weather stations are automated and report data to the internet 96 times each day. It was funded by the Florida legislature through IFAS in 1998 with the support of Florida Farm Bureau. The locations are mostly on public property: forest observation, research centers, county facilities. All are mounted on a 10 metres (32.8 ft) tower with a concrete base and guy wires.

== Policy ==
The Florida Farm Bureau states that their policies originate from recommendations by members at their (county) level. A local member has an idea (proposal) that is researched, vetted with the appropriate state advisory committee and is rejected or becomes a resolution. The resolution is sent to the Ag Policy Division for review, then to the FFBF Oversight Committee for conflicts. A question exists: if a resolution is rejected because it is in conflict with existing policy, how would existing policy ever change?

The State Annual Meeting is held in October, where a representative from each county Farm Bureau votes on each resolution. An implementation plan is developed for approved resolutions and executed. If the resolution has national implications, it is forwarded to the American Farm Bureau Federation.

There are sixteen state advisory committees, each headed by a volunteer leader: Apiculture, Aquaculture, Beef, Budget & Economy, Citrus, Dairy, Environmental Horticulture, Equine, Forestry,Fruit/Vegetable, Labor, Oversight, Peanut/Cotton, Sugar, Trade and Water/Natural Resources.

== CARES ==
CARES is an acronym for COUNTY ALLIANCE FOR RESPONSIBLE ENVIRONMENTAL STEWARDSHIP The program was started to recognize ranchers and farmers who take the time and effort to protect the state's natural resources. This is accomplished by utilizing Best Management Practices. A farm/ranch must be nominated and subsequently approved by a state agency after a minimum of two years of operation in one of the following programs: water quality, soil & water conservation, natural resource conservation, pesticide/nutrient management or waste management/recycling.

== Lobbying ==
FFB staff work year-round to establish and maintain relationships with the Florida Commissioner of Agriculture and key people in the Florida Department of Agriculture and Consumer Services (FDACS), Water management districts, regulators, state commodity organizations, legislators and their staff. County farm bureau staff know their county commissioners and local government officials. IFAS states that FFB is a "potent political force" from local to national levels. According to their 2023 tax filings, all in-house lobbying expenditures were $2,000 or less, with a total of $40,332. Payments to affiliates were $1,302,821 with other fee payments of $439,101.

A 2012 investigation by The Nation detailed the large-scale federal and state political operations of the AFBF, and alleged the Bureau recruited political candidates (mostly Republicans) to affect legislative elections and appointments to state committees.

The AFBF supported the Fighting Hunger Incentive Act of 2014 (H.R. 4719; 113th Congress), a bill that would amend the federal tax laws to permanently extend and expand certain expired provisions that provided a bigger tax deduction for businesses that donated food to charitable organizations. The Farm Bureau argued that without the tax write-off, "it is cheaper in most cases for these types of businesses to throw their food away than it is to donate the food".

The AFBF has lobbied for increases in federal subsidies for crop insurance, which "is a small, but significant piece of Farm Bureau insurance companies' portfolio. In 2011, they collected over $300 million in crop insurance premiums", The Nation wrote in 2012.

=== Climate change ===
The AFBF has long opposed regulation or taxation of greenhouse gases and climate policy, justifying its actions by denying the scientific consensus on climate change. "For decades, the Farm Bureau has derailed climate action, deploying its political apparatus and 6 million members in a forceful alliance with conservative groups and the fossil fuel industry," Inside Climate News wrote in 2018.

In 2003, AFBF economists joined the Heartland and Hudson Institutes in publishing a paper that "called state or federal regulation of greenhouse gases 'unnecessary, enormously expensive, and particularly injurious to the agricultural community.'"

In 2010, the AFBF's official position was that "there is no generally agreed upon scientific assessment of the exact impact or extent of carbon emissions from human activities, their impact on past decades of warming or how they will affect future climate changes". The climate change session at the Farm Bureau's national meeting that year was entitled "Global Warming: A Red Hot Lie?" It featured Christopher C. Horner, a climate change denier and lawyer for the libertarian Competitive Enterprise Institute, a largely industry-backed group that strongly opposes limits on greenhouse gases. At the meeting, delegates unanimously approved a resolution that "strongly supports any legislative action that would suspend EPA's authority to regulate greenhouse gases under the Clean Air Act". Right before the meeting, the Union of Concerned Scientists sent the group a letter pointing out that its climate change position runs counter to that of every major scientific organization and urged it to support action on climate change. U.S. Secretary of Agriculture Tom Vilsack said that farmers have more to gain from cap and trade than they stand to lose.

By 2019, the AFBF had ceased to publicly deny climate change, but remained opposed to non-market-based solutions, including opposing taxes on carbon uses or emissions. Politico called it a "longtime, powerful foe of federal action on climate."

=== 2012 Farm Bill ===
The AFBF was heavily involved in lobbying for the 2012 farm bill, which included $9 billion in federal subsidies for crop insurance.

=== Animal welfare ===
In 2022, the AFBF joined the National Pork Producers Council in petitioning the Supreme Court of the United States to overturn California's Prevention of Cruelty to Farm Animals Act in National Pork Producers Council v. Ross.

=== WOTUS ===
In 2023, AFBF was one of several organizations to legally challenge the new Waters of the United States rule.

== Insurance ==
=== Casualty ===
After World War II ended, leaders from state farm bureaus in Florida, Arkansas, Texas and Mississippi met with the goal of better insurance rates and service for their members. On September 30, 1947, the for-profit Southern Farm Bureau Casualty Insurance Company (SFBCIC) began business in Jackson, Mississippi. Each state farm bureau shared equally in the ownership of SFBCIC's stock company and would share the profits. Louisiana and South Carolina joined within a few years; Colorado in 2005. Texas later opted out to form their own company.

In 2023, SFBCIC had profits of $72.51 million on revenues of $732.3 million; SFBLIC had profits of $72.51 million on revenues of $732.3 million. Florida Farm Bureau reported 2023 revenue of about $100 million and an investment portfolio worth more than $1 billion, while executive compensation was in the high six figures.

=== Life ===
Investment corporations were established in Alabama, Arkansas, Kentucky, Mississippi, and Texas by each respective state's farm bureau before Southern Farm Bureau Life Insurance Company of Mississippi was chartered October 31, 1946 and business commenced December 18, 1946. The company now operates in 11 states (including Florida) and has over 1.3 million policies. It is a for-profit business and a capital stock life insurance company. Florida Farm Bureau recommends life insurance and financial products to its members through the for-profit Southern Farm Bureau Life Insurance Company, of which Florida Farm Bureau is financially affiliated as stock owner.

=== Annuity ===
The Southern Farm Bureau Annuity Insurance Company is co-owned by 10 state Farm Bureaus: Arkansas, Georgia, Kentucky, Louisiana, Mississippi, North Carolina, South Carolina, Texas, Virginia and Florida Farm Bureau Holding Corporation. Controlling interest in each of these holding or investment corporations is owned by the relevant state Farm Bureau.
