= Christopher Horner =

Christopher Horner may refer to:

- Christopher C. Horner, American attorney and author
- Chris Horner (born 1971), American bicycle racer

== See also ==
- Christian Horner (born 1973), British Formula 1 manager
