= Country Financial =

Group of US insurance and financial services

- Type: Mutual, stock
- Industry: Insurance and financial services
- Founded: 1925
- Headquarters: Bloomington, Illinois, US
- Key people: Rob McDade, CFO
- Products: Insurance and investing
- Services: auto insurance home insurance life insurance farm insurance commercial insurance retirement planning investment management trust services
- Revenue: $3.913 billion USD (2022)
- Number of employees: 3,135 (2022)
- Website: www.countryfinancial.com

Country Financial (capitalized trademark COUNTRY Financial) is a group of US insurance and financial services companies with customers in 19 states. The group of companies offers a range of insurance and financial products and services, including auto, home, life, farm, commercial insurance, retirement planning, investment management and trust services.

The Country Financial group is ranked annually in the Fortune 1000 list, which lists American companies by revenue.

The corporate headquarters are in Bloomington, Illinois.

== History ==
The company was founded in 1925 when a group of Illinois Agricultural Association members developed an organization to provide fire and lightning insurance for farmers. In the company's first year of operation, more than 385 Illinois farmers worked part-time, offering insurance services to their friends and neighbors.

Crop insurance became available in 1926, auto insurance in 1927, and life insurance in 1929. Financial services, including retirement planning, estate planning, investment management, and annuities have been available for more than 35 years.

As of 2021, Country Financial and its alliances serve nearly one million households and businesses in 19 states. The company has more than 3,000 employees and 2,000 financial representatives.

For more than 90 consecutive years, COUNTRY Financial Property/Casualty group and COUNTRY Life Insurance Company have been rated A or higher by AM Best.

Rob McDade is the current CFO.

== Operating companies ==
The Country Financial insurance group consists of multiple operating companies:

- Country Mutual Insurance Company
- Country Casualty Insurance Company
- Country Preferred Insurance Company
- Country Life Insurance Company
- Country Investors Life Assurance Company
- Country Trust Bank
- Country Capital Management Company
