= Equity-indexed annuity =

An indexed annuity (the word equity previously tied to indexed annuities has been removed to help prevent the assumption of stock market investing being present in these products) in the United States is a type of tax-deferred annuity whose credited interest is linked to an equity index—typically the S&P 500 or international index. It guarantees a minimum interest rate (typically between 1% and 3%) if held to the end of the surrender term and protects against a loss of principal. An equity index annuity is a contract with an insurance or annuity company. The returns may be higher than fixed instruments such as certificates of deposit (CDs), money market accounts, and bonds but not as high as market returns. Equity Index Annuities are insured by each state's Guarantee Fund; coverage is not as strong as the insurance provided by the FDIC. For example, in California the fund will cover "80%, not to exceed $250,000." The guarantees in the contract are backed by the relative strength of the insurer.

The contracts may be suitable for a portion of the asset portfolio for those who want to avoid risk and are in retirement or nearing retirement age. The objective of purchasing an equity index annuity is to realize greater gains than those provided by CDs, money markets or bonds, while still protecting principal. The long term ability of Equity Index Annuities to beat the returns of other fixed instruments is a matter of debate.

Indexed annuities represent about 25.3% of all fixed annuity sales in 2020 according to the My Annuity Store, Inc..

Equity-indexed annuities may also be referred to as fixed indexed annuities or simple indexed annuities. The mechanics of equity-indexed annuities are often complex and the returns can vary greatly depending on the month and year the annuity is purchased. Like many other types of annuities, equity-indexed annuities usually carry a surrender charge for early withdrawal. These "surrender periods" range between 3 and 16 years; typically about ten.

== A different way to credit interest ==
The indexed annuity is virtually identical to a fixed annuity except in the way interest is calculated. As an example, consider a $100,000 fixed annuity that credits a 4% annual effective interest rate. The owner receives an interest credit of $4,000. However, in an equity-indexed annuity, the interest credit is linked to the equity markets. For example: Assume the index is the S&P 500, a one-year point-to-point method is used, and the annuity has an 8% cap. The $100,000 annuity could credit anything between 0% and 8% based on the change in the S&P 500. The cap, 8% in this example, is determined by how much is afforded by budget which is usually at or near the 4% fixed rate. If fixed rates increase, it would be expected that the cap would increase as well.

This allows the owner the security of knowing that the $100,000 is safe but rather than receiving the sure 4% they can receive up to 8%. Historically since 1950, an 8% cap on the S&P 500 has resulted in an average interest credit of 5.2%, very similar to what is considered the "risk free rate of return" delivered by T-bills, 5.1% over a similar period. The return may also be adjusted by other factors such as the participation rate and market value adjustments to cover bring the cost of the option into the budget available.

This means the owner of the indexed annuity now has assumed more risk than a fixed annuity but less than being in the equity markets themselves. The result is that the expected yield (risk adjusted) for an indexed annuity is higher than a fixed annuity, CD, etc. However, the expected yield of being in the market is higher for several reasons.

The principal (in our example the $100,000) is at risk of loss when owning the index outright. Equity Index Annuity does not participate in dividends as owning the index outright would and similar there are no ongoing transaction expenses or fees. Interest is compounded as frequently as when interest is credited and this is almost always annually but contracts are available that credit interest over a 5-year term.

The taxation of the gains in an indexed annuity is identical to that of fixed annuities. Taxes are deferred until monies are received and then interest is withdrawn first and taxed as ordinary income. If the index was owned outright, gains would not be tax deferred, but may qualify for the more favorable capital gains tax rate.

== Understanding options ==
This way of linking to an equity index like the S&P 500 or Dow Jones is accomplished through an option, usually a call option. A call option is the right, but not the obligation, to purchase something at a future date for a specified price.

The naming convention for options used by the insurance industry is different from that of Wall Street, but the options are structurally identical. Options commonly seen in indexed annuities include:

- Insurance vs. Wall Street
- Point-to-Point vs. European
- Monthly Average vs. Asian
- Monthly Point-to-Point vs. Cliquet
- Performance Triggered vs. Binary

The options in indexed annuities can usually be fit into the following taxonomy developed by the National Association of Fixed Annuities.

Term - the length of time before option matures, usually one year. Two, three, four, and ten are also prevalent in the market. Some longer term options are but have a "highwater" feature that allows interest to be credited more frequently. An example of this would be a ten-year Monthly Average option that credits interest each year if there is a gain.

Index - the equity, stock, bond, or other index to which the interest credit is linked.

Interest Crediting Method- the method used to determine the performance of an index. Annual Point to point is the most common crediting method. For example, of the S&P 500 index starts at 1120 and ends at 1300 then the point to point gain is 16.07%.

Crediting Components - the way the option is limited in order to reduce the cost (and subsequent return) so that it becomes affordable. As an example an annual point to point crediting method with a 7% annual cap would credit 7% interest assuming the 16.07% index performance in the example above.

"Market value adjustment" - the company may reserve the right to adjust the value of your account based on current market conditions. This adjustment is only applied when a surrender charge is applied.

The most common adjustments are cap, spread, participation rate or a combination of the three. Other adjustments are less common. In keeping with the preceding example and assuming a 3% spread as the crediting component, the policyholder would not receive the 16.07% point-to-point gain, but rather 13.07% as an interest credit.

Should provide examples for:

- P2P with Participation Rate
- Monthly Averaging with Cap
- Monthly Averaging with Fee

Should also link to the withdrawal benefits provided in variable annuities and indexed annuities at this point. These concepts were added because of the risk associated with the accumulation in both variable annuities and indexed annuities.

== US Taxation ==
While the taxes on gains are deferred, earnings are taxed at an individual's ordinary income tax rate as opposed to capital gains and qualified stock dividends which are tax at lower capital gains rates. Also annuities do not qualify for a step in basis at the owner's death while most stock, bond and real estate investments are. Any earnings will be taxed at the beneficiary's ordinary income tax rate.

== See also ==
- Indexed annuity
