= Kentucky Heritage Council =

The Kentucky Heritage Council is a state agency in Kentucky that oversees and administers all the historic preservation and incentive programs in Kentucky, including the National Register of Historic Places. The Council also maintains an archive of historical documents.

The Council is under the Tourism, Arts, and Heritage Cabinet for the Kentucky state government. The State Historic Preservation Officer and Executive Director is Craig Potts. Sixteen Council members are appointed by the governor to serve four year terms.

The Council has an archive of survey forms, maps, photographs, and other images of historic structures and archaeological sites in the state.

Council programs include the Kentucky Crossroads Rural Heritage Development Initiative, a rural preservation/economic development partnership with Preservation Kentucky. The Kentucky Archaeological Survey, a partnership with the University of Kentucky Department of Anthropology, promotes the preservation of archaeological sites and educates the public about protecting these resources.

== See also ==
- Kentucky Arts Council
