= Illinois Farm Bureau =

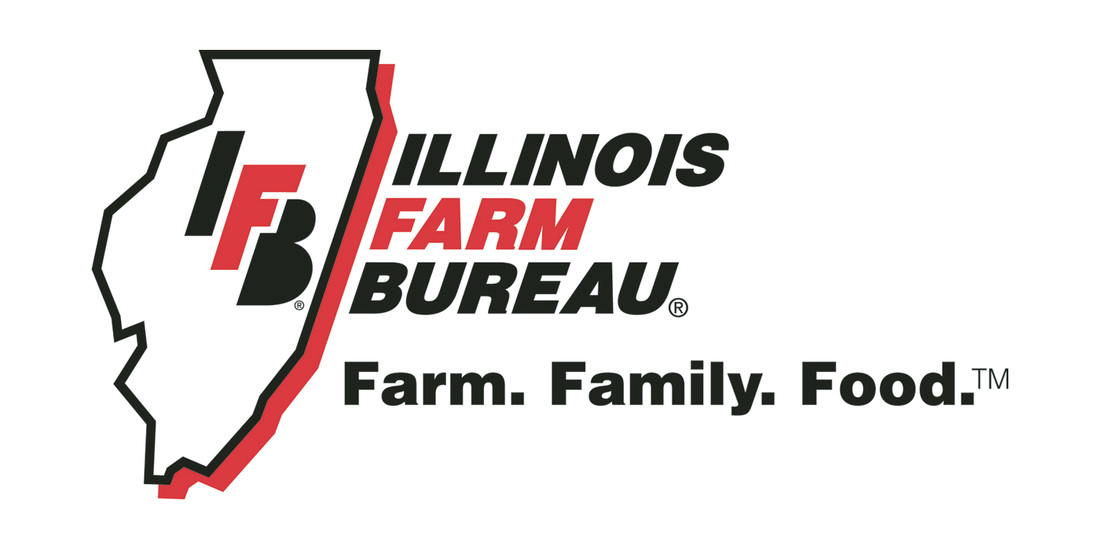
The Illinois Farm Bureau logo

The Illinois Farm Bureau (IFB) is a nonprofit U.S. organization controlled by agribusinesses, landowners and farmers who join the IFB through one of the 96 county Farm Bureaus in Illinois. The organization's legal name is the Illinois Agricultural Association. The IFB was founded in 1916 by a group of farmers who met at the University of Illinois to discuss the need for agricultural education, better information for farmers, and more effective farming practices. Modernly, the IFB represents two out of three Illinois farmers.

== History ==
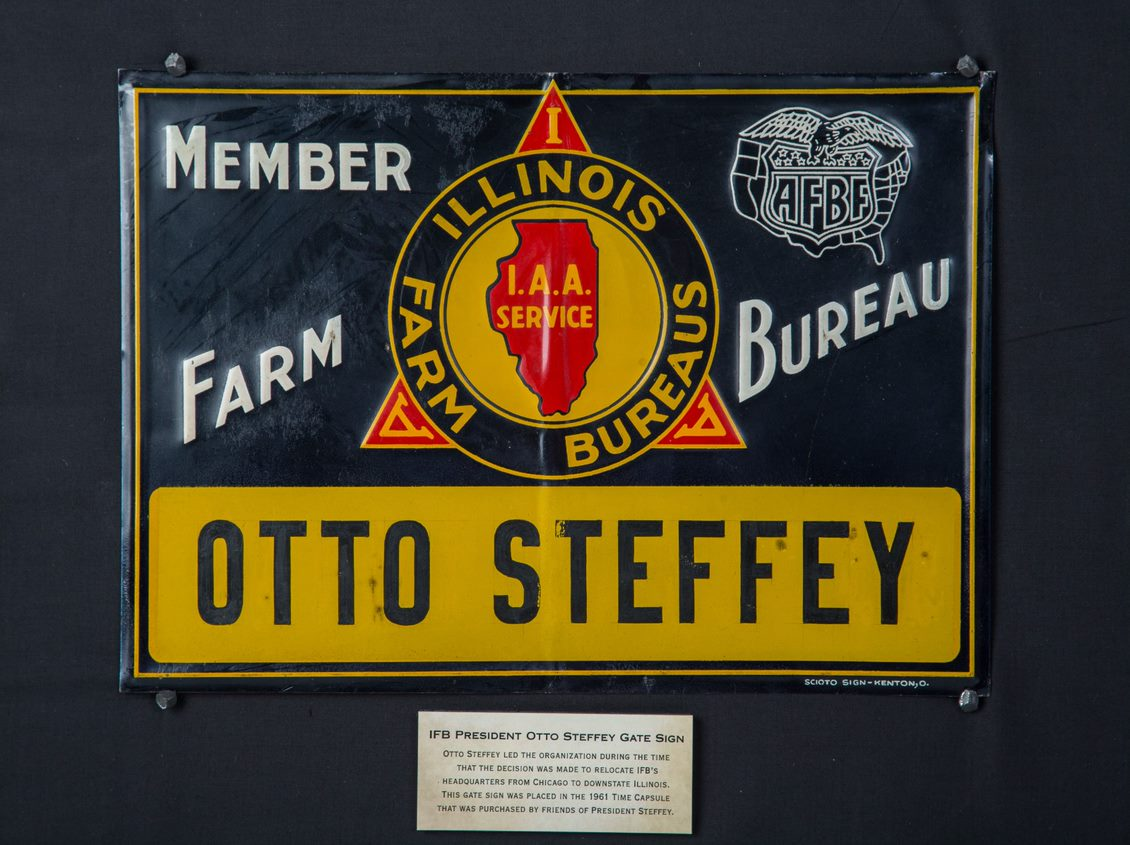
This fence sign once belonged to Otto Steffey, the Illinois Farm Bureau president when IFB headquarters moved from Chicago to Bloomington. The sign was part of a time capsule that was buried after the move and was then unsealed in honor of the IFB's 100th birthday.

On July 2, 1862, Abraham Lincoln signed the Morrill Land-Grant College Act into law. Through this monumental act, Congress was able to begin the process of providing advanced education to America's farmers. Johnathan Baldwin Turner's Land Grant University, now known as the University of Illinois, directly led to the formation of the Illinois Farm Bureau. The legislation behind Land Grants helped shape American agriculture during the Civil War.

In May 1862, the Homestead Act was signed into law and began creating new opportunities in agriculture for thousands of people. The transcontinental railroad was also authorized by Congress at this time, allowing for agriculture to become the biggest business in America. The Smith Lever Act passed in 1914 not only played a vital role in agricultural education and the creation of the United States Extension Service, but the founding of the Illinois Agricultural Association, or Illinois Farm Bureau, in 1916.

DeKalb, Kankakee, McHenry, Livingston, Will, DuPage, Kane and Tazewell counties all had organizations in place to assist in educating America's farmers. However, Tazewell County is credited with being the first county to use the name, "Illinois Farm Bureau." The Tazewell County Farm Bureau employed its first farm advisor on June 1, 1913.

Sears Roebuck was instrumental in aiding county Farm Bureaus by offering $1000 grants to allow them to begin work throughout the county. By 1913, it was clear that there was a need for a statewide association, so on July 1, 1913, county advisors convened in Pontiac, Illinois, to discuss problems and experiences. By December 1913, in Champaign, Illinois, the statewide association was created and named the Illinois Association of County Agriculturalists. By mid-1914, the association was up from just four to thirteen members. Soon, the Illinois Association of County Agriculturalists was changed to what we know today, the Illinois Agricultural Association. In 1916, Herman Danforth was elected as the first IAA president.

There were 13 charter members to the IAA that hailed from Adams, Bureau, Champaign, DeKalb, Iroquois, LaSalle, Livingston, Macon, Mason, McLean, Tazewell, Will and Woodford counties.

The American Farm Bureau Federation was formed on November 12, 1919, in Chicago, Illinois.

At the 1922 Illinois Farm Bureau Annual Meeting, it was decided that it was necessary for the organization to improve "net farm income." Over the next 20 years, IFB would become a "system of statewide cooperatives, insurance companies, and other agriculture-related businesses".
