= Allied Insurance =

Provides insurance to individuals, families and businesses

- Company type: Subsidiary
- Industry: Insurance
- Founded: 1929; 97 years ago
- Headquarters: Des Moines, IA 50391 United States
- Number of employees: 4100
- Parent: Nationwide
- Website: www.alliedinsurance.com

Allied Insurance provides insurance to individuals, families and businesses. Headquarters are located in Des Moines, Iowa, United States. They are represented by independent insurance agents through their regional offices and staff in Des Moines, Iowa; Lincoln, Nebraska, Denver, Colorado, and Sacramento, California. Allied employs more than 4,100 people throughout the U.S..

== History ==
In 1998, Nationwide merged with Allied and assumed responsibility for Allied's independent agency network. In 1999, CalFarm Insurance in Sacramento, California joined Nationwide as well. These organizations, along with several others, now all operate as worldwide.
