= Fixed annuity =

Fixed annuities are insurance products which protect against loss and generally offer fixed rates of return. The rates are typically based on the current interest rate environment. They are offered by licensed and regulated insurance companies. State insurance/insolvency funds guarantees vary from state to state, and may not cover 100% of the Annuity Value. For example, in California the fund will cover "80% not to exceed $250,000."

== Types ==
There are two types of fixed annuities: traditional fixed and indexed annuities. (A third type of annuity, called a variable annuity, is not discussed here since it is not a type of fixed product.)

=== Traditional fixed annuities ===
Traditional fixed annuities are regulated by state insurance departments and sold through insurance agents, banks, or registered representatives. Fixed annuities pursuant to state insurance law must provide a minimum rate of interest as provided in the annuity policy. How the actual rate of interest is credited on the policy differentiates traditional fixed annuities from indexed annuities. Traditional fixed annuities pay interest on the premium contributed at a rate declared by the insurer in advance. Some traditional fixed annuities offer multiple years guaranteed at the same rate, while others will leave the insurance company with the ability to adjust the rate annually. This rate can never be less than the minimum guaranteed rate stated in the policy. Fixed annuities are a very conservative safe money place for retirement dollars. Fixed annuity interest rates are generated from a portfolio of US treasuries or other low risk, fixed income instruments.

=== Indexed annuities ===
Indexed annuities are a type of fixed annuity which are regulated and distributed in the same manner as fixed annuities (through licensed insurance agents). Indexed annuities are a conservative safe money place for retirement dollars. Indexed annuities usually provide a purchaser with various options for interest crediting. A buyer does have an option to elect a declared interest rate, which generally allows an allocation of anywhere from 0-100% of the account value, and functions the same as a traditional fixed annuity. However, the annuity is designed for higher potential interest rates, and provides other allocation options which consider the performance of an outside stock index (such as the Standard and Poor's 500, a.k.a. S&P 500) to determine the rate of interest. These options pay interest at a rate determined by a formula which considers any increase in the outside index, often subject to a “participation rate”, and/or “cap, and/or "spread”.

All indexed annuities have a floor of zero, meaning the absolute worst-case scenario due to a downturn in the market index is a consumer might receive no interest in a particular year, however, he or she cannot lose any previously credited interest or premiums. A “participation rate” is a set percentage multiplied by any percentage increase in the outside index. For instance, if a particular index crediting method offers a 50% participation rate, and the calculated return was 10% for the year, the policy would earn a rate of 5% (10% calculated return x 50% participation = 5% return). A "cap" is a set maximum percentage based on the performance of the outside index. For instance, if a particular index crediting method offers a 6% cap, and the calculated return was 10% for the year, the policy would earn a rate of 6%. A "spread" is a percentage of reduction between the calculated return and the interest rate the consumer will be credit with. For instance, if a particular index crediting method offers a 4% spread, and the calculated return was 10% for the year, the policy would earn a rate of 6% (10% calculated return - 4% spread = 6% return). All participation rates, caps and spreads are set by the insurance company at the beginning of a policy. Unless guaranteed in the policy, the insurance company has the ability to adjust them on an annual basis. Participation rates, caps and spreads are known as "moving parts". Most annuities being issued today have only one moving part in determining an index calculation (i.e. only a cap or only a participation rate), however, it is possible to have multiple moving parts in determining an index calculation (i.e. a cap combined with a participation rate). An annuity with multiple moving parts is not necessarily better or worse than an annuity with only one moving part, and there is no way of determining in advance of a policy year whether a participation rate, cap and/or spread will yield the best performance.

Purchasers of fixed indexed annuities also must pick the method of determining any increase in the index they choose for his/her policy. The three most common methods are "annual point-to-point", "monthly average" and "monthly sum" also commonly referred to as "monthly point-to-point". The "annual point-to-point" method determines the value of the index on issue date of the policy and compares it to the value of that index on a date in the future (generally one year later) to determine the calculated return. The "monthly average" method looks at the value of the index on the issue date, then on each monthly anniversary throughout the policy year. The monthly index values are then averaged and compared with the initial index value to determine the calculated return. The "monthly sum" interest crediting method tracked each month (subject to a cap each month) and the results from each month are summed to get the annual interest rate credited.

A policy year is measured from the day the premium is invested and not on a calendar year basis. Interest is credited to the policy only once a year on indexed interest crediting methods. Once interest is credited it can not be taken away in a subsequent year when the measuring index is a negative value. This feature of an index annuity is often referred to as an "annual reset". The "annual reset" provides a second benefit aside from safeguarding the principal and subsequent interest gains, it also prevents the policy from having to recover from any sort of loss to the outside stock index in the previous policy year. For instance, if the S&P 500 index were to drop 40% during a policy year, the annuity would be credited with no interest for that policy year. However, if the S&P 500 had a calculated return of 10% the following year using an annual point-to-point calculation with a 6% cap, the annuity would earn 6% on top of where it had left off the policy year prior. An example of this benefit can be seen in this simple example that ignores dividends: A direct investment in an index with an initial investment $100,000, a 40% loss after one year takes the value to $60,000, a 10% gain the following year would increase the value to $66,000. The same investment being tracked in the index annuity with an initial investment of $100,000, a 40% loss after one year is replaced with a 0 and the account balance is still $100,000, the subsequent 10% gain the following year is reduced to 6% due to the cap, which would be a $6,000 gain, so the $100,000 investment would be worth $106,000. This particular example illustrates why these annuities tend to be marketed more heavily towards seniors/retirees, as an indexed annuity provides a true safeguard against market losses but still offers a level of exposure to market-based returns.

As required by state insurance law, indexed annuities do provide for a minimum amount of interest. This interest rate is stated in the policy (usually 1% to 3%), but does not apply to 100% of the premiums paid. Usually the rate applies to 87.5% of the premiums paid. This guaranteed rate is considered only against premiums paid and does not consider any interest previously credited or "bonuses" applied by the insurance company. When considering a policy's value, the customer receives the higher of the value considering the guaranteed formula or the indexed account value. To put this guarantee into perspective, if the guarantee was 87.5% of the premiums paid accumulated at 1% compounded annually, it would take 13 years for a policyholder's guaranteed minimum value to equal 100% of a single sum premium paid.

Like traditional annuities, indexed annuities have surrender charges. These charges vary from 20% down to 1% and policies can have surrender charge periods ranging from 1 – 16 years. 10–13 years is the most common length of a surrender charge period on indexed annuities. Some policies measure the surrender charge period from the date the policy is issued, others apply the surrender charge period to each premium paid to the policy.

Indexed annuities are retirement savings vehicles and are not meant for short term savings. Most indexed annuities do provide a penalty-free amount that may be withdrawn each year (for example, the right to withdraw 10% of the annuity's value per year). These products may also waive surrender charges if the policy is annuitized (converted into an immediate annuity that would generate income payments over a specified period of time which is elected by the policyholder). Some annuities provide additional riders to have surrender charges waived (generally at no additional cost) in the event the annuitant is confined to a nursing home or is diagnosed with a terminal illness.

=== Income rider for indexed annuities ===
In recent years, many indexed annuities can be issued with a rider designed to supply a lifetime income payment to the policyholder that does not require annuitization, thus leaving the policyholder in control of the balance of the account. These "income riders" are calculated separately than the indexed annuity itself, however, they use the same initial premium figures for each calculation. An "income rider" generally will provide a specified accumulation rate which is guaranteed for a certain period of years. The "income rider" calculations create an "income pool" which is strictly an accounting figure that cannot be accessed as a single lump sum by the policyholder or beneficiary. The "income pool" continues to grow annually at the specified accumulation rate until such time the guarantee period expires or the policyholder opts to begin taking "lifetime income payments" from the account. Once "lifetime income payments" begin, the "income pool" stops accumulating, and the value of the income pool is used to determine the amount of income that will be paid out annually (it can usually be paid monthly, quarterly or semi-annually as well).

The amount of income produced by the "income rider" will depend on several factors, primarily the age of the policyholder at the time they opt for income, the specified accumulation rate and the length of time the "income pool" has been given to accumulate. Each time an income payment is paid to the policyholder, the indexed annuity account value is decreased by that same amount. "Income riders" that provide lifetime income are generally used as a means of allowing a policyholder to supplement their income, especially in retirement, without the possibility of outliving their money because even if the indexed annuity's account value falls to zero, the income payment from the "income rider" will continue until the death of the policyholder. If the policyholder dies and funds remain in the indexed annuity account value, those funds would be paid to the beneficiary(-ies). Some of these income riders are offered with no fees, while others carry an annual fee (generally 1% or less) which is deducted directly from the indexed annuity account value.

As with all traditional fixed annuities, money can be withdrawn from an indexed annuity at any time (but such withdrawal may be subject to a surrender charge if the policy is still within the surrender charge period and the penalty-free withdrawal has already been exhausted). Owners may also choose to receive a payment based on the value of the policy for their lifetime (called annuitization).

Some annuities also have an additional feature called a Market Value Adjustment or MVA. MVA applies when a withdrawal is made from the annuity in excess of the penalty-free amount. Generally, if interest rates are lower at time of the withdrawal than at the time the policy was purchased, the value of the annuity would increase. If interest rates are higher, the reverse is true.

In the event of the owner's (and the annuitant's in some policies) death, the beneficiary of the contract usually receives any remaining value in the policy, and if the annuity had been annuitized and additional guaranteed payments remained, subsequent annuity payment would be made to the beneficiary at the same intervals the deceased was receiving them until the guaranteed period has expired.

Indexed annuities were first offered by Keyport (now known as Sun Life) in February 1995. Sales of the products were less than a half billion that year, and have since exceeded $30 billion per year since 2009. There are 44 different insurance companies offering indexed annuities today

On January 16, 2009, the Securities and Exchange Commission (“SEC”) issued Rule 151A claiming indexed annuities should be regulated as securities and should only be sold by registered representatives. A lawsuit was filed on the same day challenging the SEC's ability to regulate fixed indexed annuities. Legislation was also introduced in Congress to exempt these annuities from securities regulation. On July 13, 2010, The Court of Appeals for the D.C. Circuit vacated Rule 151A. On July 21, 2010, President Obama signed HR 4173 (Dodd-Frank Wall Street Reform and Consumer Protection Act) which contained a last minute amendment by Senator Harkin (“Harkin Amendment”) which exempted fixed index annuities from regulation by the SEC and left these products to be regulated by the state insurance departments.

== See also ==
- Equity-indexed annuity
