= Georgia Farm Bureau Federation =

The Georgia Farm Bureau Federation (GFB) is Georgia's largest voluntary agricultural organization with nearly 400,000 member families. It is an independent, non-governmental, membership organization. The membership is mainly composed of farm families in rural communities.

== History ==
Farmers in the early 1900s formed the GFB, which evolved as an indirect result of the establishment of Georgia Extension Service programs. The group paid membership dues to the American Farm Bureau and the 1921 national convention was held in Atlanta. However, the organization dwindled during the Great Depression.

The current Georgia Farm Bureau was re-formed in 1937 by 50 north Georgia "dirt farmers" who wanted a unified voice in dealing with legislators in both Atlanta and Washington, D.C., That primary mission has not changed and today the Georgia Farm Bureau Federation continues to represent agriculture with a grassroots network of 159 county Farm Bureau organizations. Each county farm bureau has its own by-laws and is led by local officers and a board of directors.

== Mission ==
"The purpose of the Georgia Farm Bureau Federation, as the largest farm organization in Georgia, is to provide leadership and assistance to the agricultural sector, to promote farm products, to aid in agri-related procurement, to be a spokesman for the farmer in the legislative arena, to be a leader in the development and expansion of farm markets, to strive for more agricultural research and educational funds and facilities—in essence—to use the Georgia Farm Bureau organization and its facilities as the vehicle with which to assist in providing farm families a fair and equitable standard of living and to ensure the existence of agriculture as a vital and thriving industry in the future." (GFB By-Laws)

== Member services ==
The five-story, 171,000-square-foot (15,900 m^{2}) GFB corporate office building in Macon, 75 miles (121 km) south of Atlanta, has a full-service cafeteria and 325-seat auditorium. It is a hub of agriculture-related meetings in the state. There are approximately 600 "home office" employees, in addition to over 500 insurance agents located throughout the state to serve members.

In addition to these, the Georgia Farm Bureau family includes other operating entities:

Certified Farm Markets is a program operated by GFB's Commodities/Marketing Department which promotes farmer-operated pick-your-own or roadside markets and Christmas Tree farms throughout the state. A Georgia Farm Bureau Certified Farm Market is a retail farm market operated by a bona fide producer of agricultural products. Each market location will display a "Georgia Certified Farm Market" sign denoting its membership. These markets sell locally grown, farm-fresh products. In addition to having ripe products, many Certified Farm Markets also offer a variety of Agri-Tourism activities.

The Georgia Farm Radio Network (GFRN), a statewide farm broadcast network, is a joint venture of Georgia Farm Bureau, Inc., and Georgia News Network. The network, based at GFB, is carried by 47 Georgia radio stations. GFRN produces 7 agriculture news programs each day to keep Georgia agriculture and agribusiness informed.

Farm Monitor is a television show about Georgia agriculture.
