= Christopher C. Horner =

American lawyer

- Education: Washington University in St. Louis
- Occupation: Attorney
- Employer: Competitive Enterprise Institute
- Notable work: The Politically Incorrect Guide to Global Warming (and Environmentalism) (2007)
- Title: Senior Fellow

Christopher C. Horner is an attorney in Washington, D.C. and a Senior Fellow at the non-profit libertarian think tank Competitive Enterprise Institute. He opposes the scientific consensus on climate change. He is the author of three books disputing the scientific evidence for man-made global warming. He was supported by coal companies. Horner has been criticized for hounding climate scientists with frivolous requests for documentation and emails.

== Biography ==
Horner received his Juris Doctor from Washington University School of Law.

He has represented non-profit libertarian think tank Competitive Enterprise Institute as well as Members of the U.S. House and Senate on matters of environmental policy in the federal courts, including the US Supreme Court.

=== Writing ===
Horner has written on numerous topics in publications such as law reviews, legal and industrial trade journals, and opinion pages. He is the author of four books:

- The Liberal War on Transparency (2012)
- Power Grab: How Obama's Green Policies Will Steal Your Freedom and Bankrupt America (2010)
- Red Hot Lies: How Global Warming Alarmists Use Threats, Fraud, and Deception to Keep You Misinformed (2008)
- The Politically Incorrect Guide to Global Warming (and Environmentalism) (2007)

The Politically Incorrect Guide was on The New York Times Best Seller list (paperback nonfiction) from March to October 2007.

=== Testimony and media ===
Horner has testified before the United States Senate Committee on Foreign Relations and the United States Senate Committee on Environment and Public Works, and works on a legal and policy level with numerous think tanks and policy organizations. He has given addresses to audiences in the European Parliament in Strasbourg and Brussels, and before policymakers in European capitals including London, Rome, Prague, Copenhagen, Madrid, and Warsaw; topics range from rail deregulation and unfunded pension liability to energy and environment issues. He has provided legal, policy, and political commentary several hundred times each on both television and radio, in the United States, Europe, Canada, and Australia, including on the Fox News, Court TV, MSNBC (with repeat visits on The News Hour with Jim Lehrer), BBC, CNN, CNN International, ITN, CBC, Bloomberg, and Reuters.

=== Criticisms ===
Horner "has been instrumental in orchestrating the attacks on climate scientists over the past decade in the form of vexatious and frivolous FOIA demands, efforts to force scientists to turn over all of their personal email," said Michael Mann, a senior climate scientist.

=== Coal industry support ===
In 2015, bankruptcy court documents for the coal company Alpha Natural Resources revealed Horner was privately funded by grants sent to his home address. In early June 2015, the Coal & Investment Leadership Forum, a trade show, sent a message to its email list confirming coal industry support of Horner: "As the 'war on coal' continues, I trust that the commitment we have made to support Chris Horner's work will eventually create great awareness of the illegal tactics being employed to pass laws that are intended to destroy our industry." The email was signed by Alliance Resource Partners Joe Craft III, Alpha Natural Resources Kevin Crutchfield, Drummond Company's Gary Drummond, Arch Coal's John Eaves and United Coal Co.'s Jim McGlothlin.

== Sources ==
- Biography at Competitive Enterprise Institute
