= Harlow (restaurant) =

Chain of vegetarian cafes in Portland, Oregon, U.S.

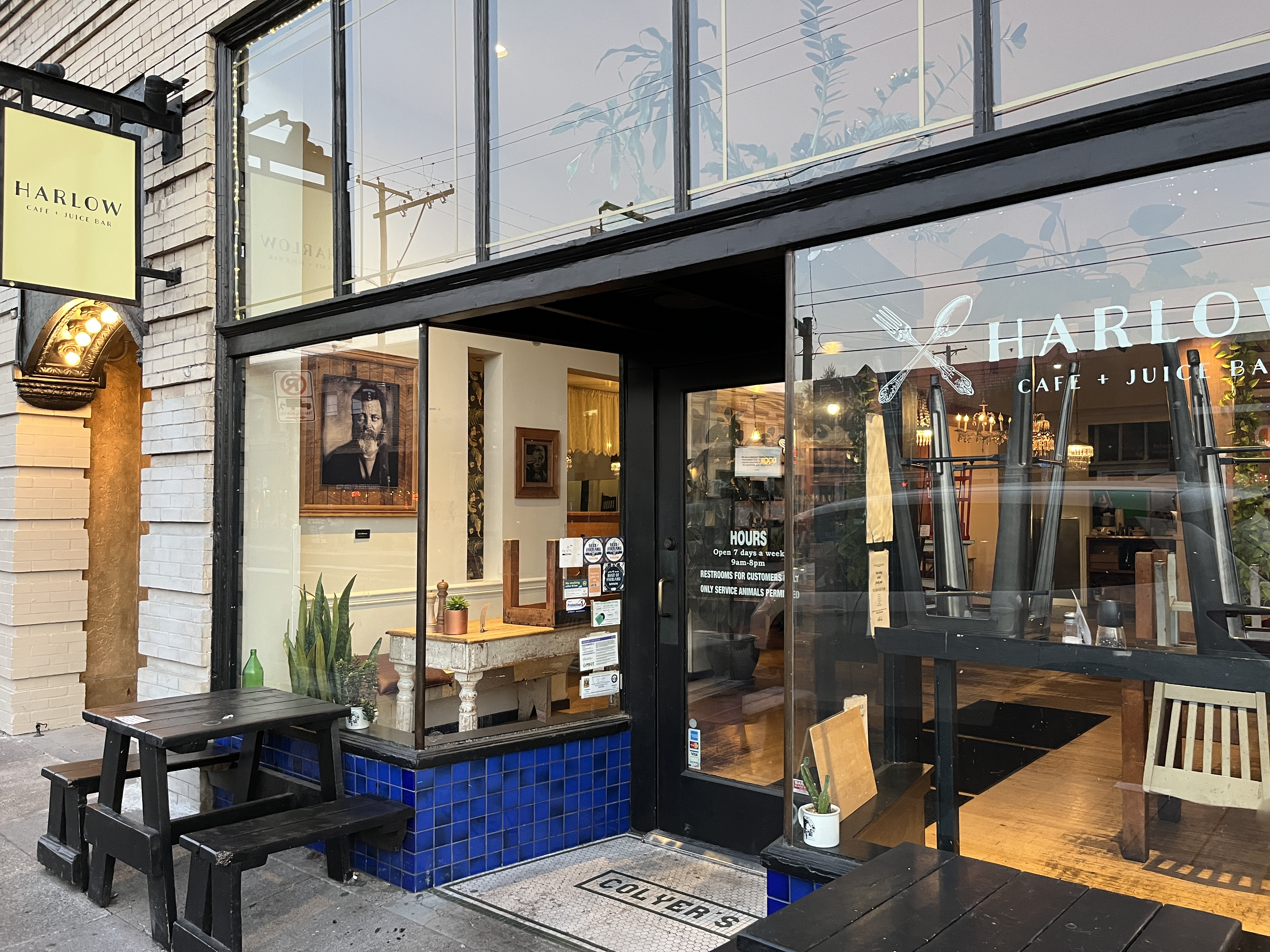
- Exterior of the original restaurant on Hawthorne Boulevard, in southeast Portland, in 2022
- Interactive map of Harlow

Restaurant information
- Established: 2013
- Owners: Adam and Jackie Sappington
- Previous owners: Britt Galloway; Karen Pride
- Location: 3715 Southeast Division Street, Portland, Multnomah, Oregon, 97202, United States
- Coordinates: 45.5049°N 122.6252°W
- Website: harlowpdx.com

Harlow is a small chain of gluten-free and vegetarian restaurants in Portland, Oregon. Britt Galloway and Karen Pride opened the original cafe on Hawthorne Boulevard, in southeast Portland's Richmond neighborhood, in 2013. The business was purchased by Adam and Jackie Sappington in 2018. The couple opened a second location in northwest Portland's Northwest District in 2021, followed by a third location on Alberta Street in northeast Portland's Vernon neighborhood. The original cafe relocated within Richmond in 2024. Harlow has garnered a positive reception.

== Description ==
Harlow is a small chain vegetarian cafes in Portland, Oregon, known for its dairy- and gluten-free options. The original restaurant operated on Hawthorne Boulevard, in southeast Portland's Richmond neighborhood, until 2024, when operations were moved to Division Street. Outposts have operated on 23rd Avenue in northwest Portland's Northwest District, as well as Alberta Street in northeast Portland's Vernon neighborhood.

Eater Portland has said the original and Northwest District locations have "homey, vintage-chic vibes" and plants.

=== Menu ===
The menu includes bowls with steamed vegetables, wraps with jackfruit, lattes with turmeric, and shots of chlorophyll. Options for the Betty Bowl include grains like quinoa, avocado, beans, eggs, kale and other vegetables. Sauces for bowls include avocado cilantro and jalapeño cashew. The restaurant has also served a macaroni and "cheese", a veggie burger, chipotle black bean chili, chanterelle and pumpkin soup with pepitas, as well as curry soup. The "pasta" has zucchini "noodles" with carrot, spinach, and a sun-dried-tomato pesto. Brunch options include mushroom scallion biscuits with tempeh gravy, and a spinach-kale scramble with chipotle cashew hollandaise. Some dishes include egg, which can be substituted with jackfruit or tempeh. Another scramble has pesto, and banana-oatmeal-walnut pancakes are also served for breakfast.

Harlow has offered two types of vegan hot chocolate; the classic version has bittersweet chocolate and coconut or hazelnut milk, and the red velvet variety has beet juice. Shots of CBD can be added to juices, smoothies, and other "health elixirs". Other drink options include mochas and hot toddys (with or without whisky).

== History ==
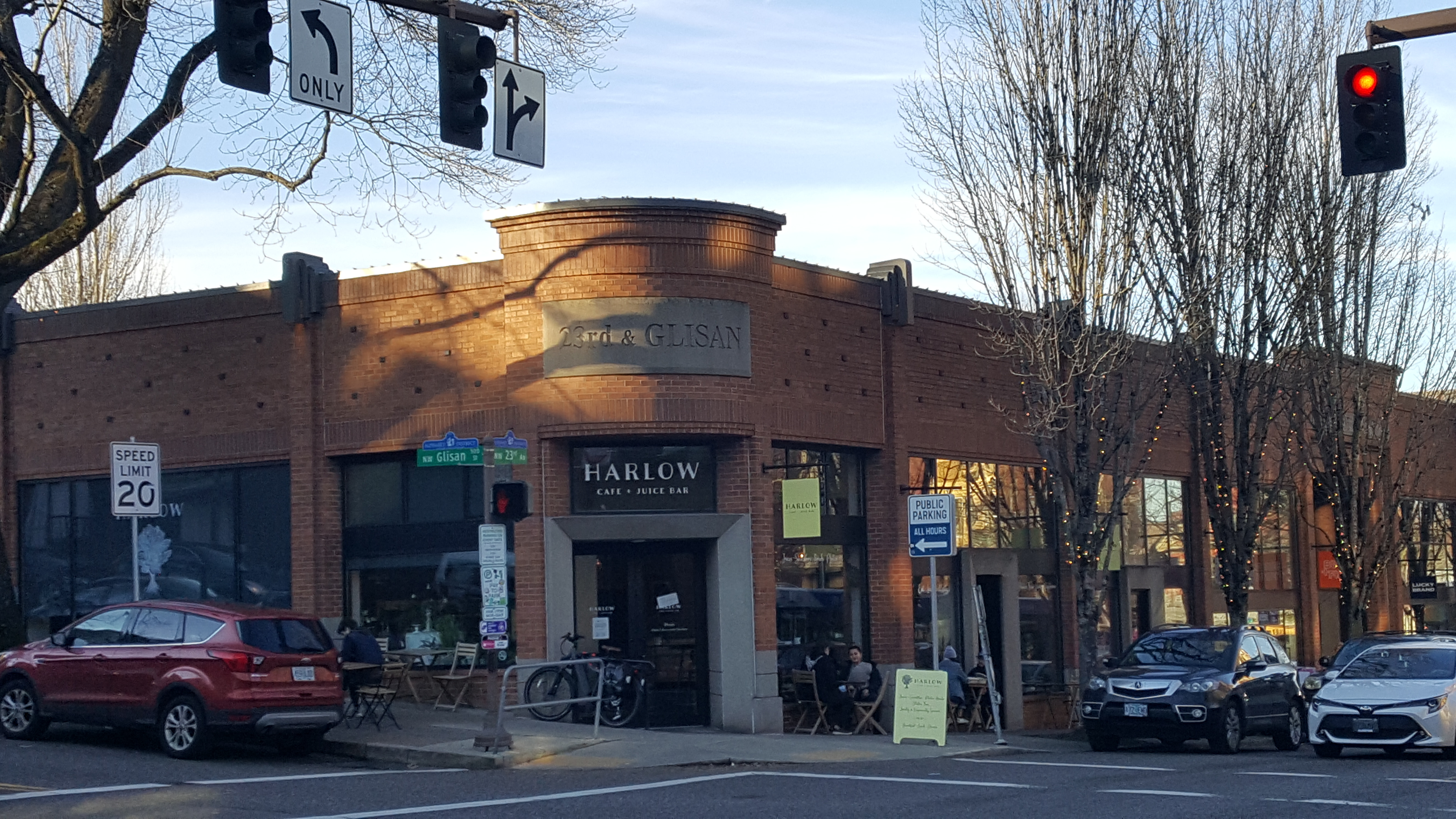
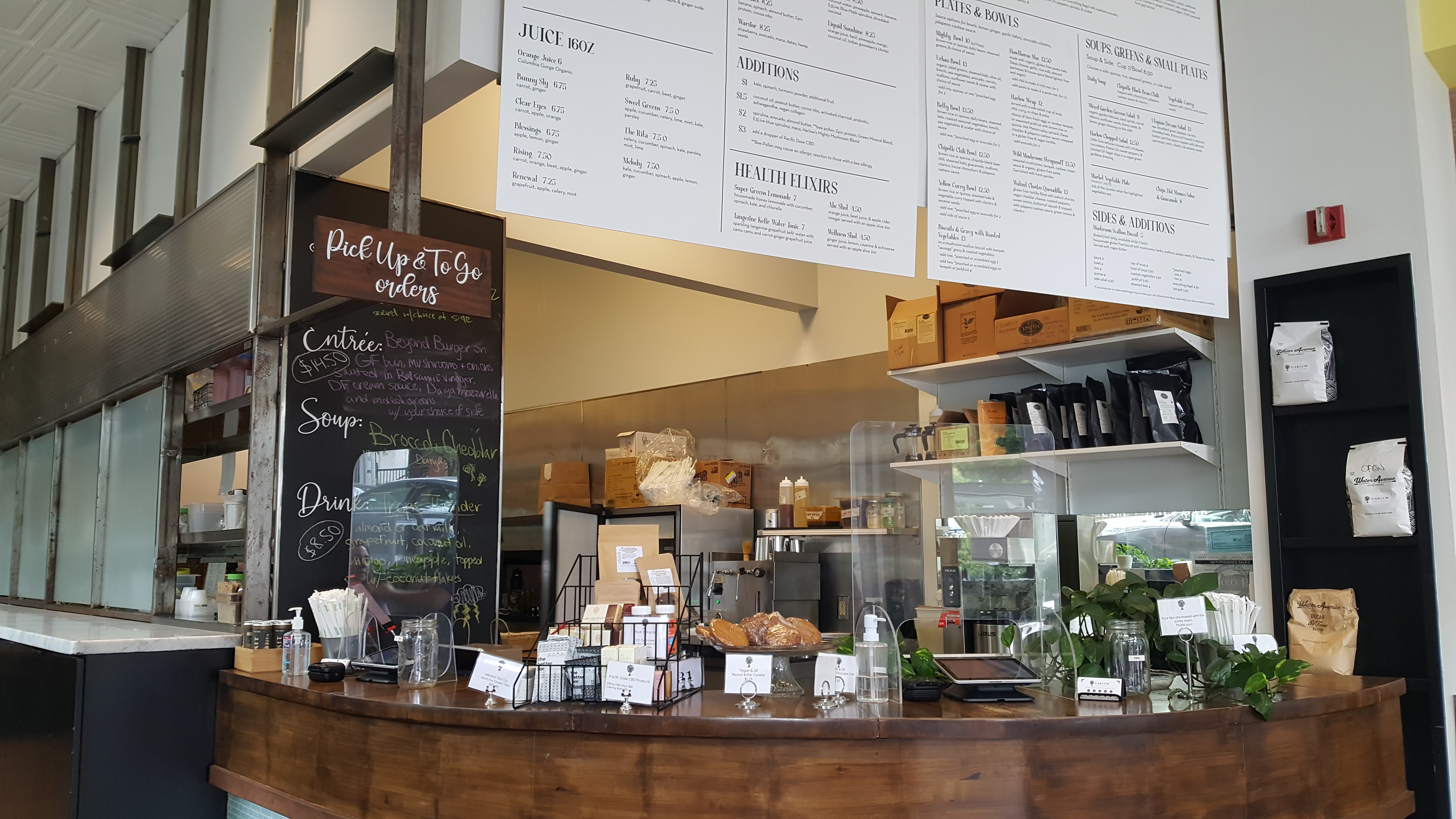
Exterior (top) and interior (bottom) of the Northwest District cafe, 2022

Britt Galloway and Karen Pride opened the original restaurant in 2013. Prasad is considered a sibling establishment. Adam and Jackie Sappington purchased Harlow (as well as Prasad) in 2018. A second location opened in the Northwest District in 2021, in a space previously occupied by Pizzicato. By 2024, a third location had opened in Vernon. In March, Harlow announced plans to relocate the original cafe to Division Street, within Richmond, operating in the space previously occupied by Xico. Afterlife operated in Harlow's original space from 2024 to 2026, followed by Jade Rabbit.

== Reception ==
Dan Schlegel and Alex Frane included Harlow in Thrillist's 2019 list of the best vegetarian and vegan-friendly eateries in Portland. Waz Wu included the restaurant in Eater Portland's 2020 overview of "satisfying" vegan soups in the city, as well as a 2021 list of Portland's "hottest sports for vegan brunch right now". Harlow won in the Best Vegetarian / Vegan Restaurant category of Willamette Week's annual readers' poll in 2020, 2022, and 2024. The business also won in the Best Gluten-Free Restaurant category in 2015 and 2024, and the Best Smoothie / Juice Bar category in 2024. Harlow was included in a Yelp list of Portland's ten best vegan eateries in 2025.

== See also ==
- List of restaurant chains in the United States
- List of vegetarian and vegan restaurants
