= Space Room Lounge and Genie's Too =

Bar and restaurant in Portland, Oregon, U.S.

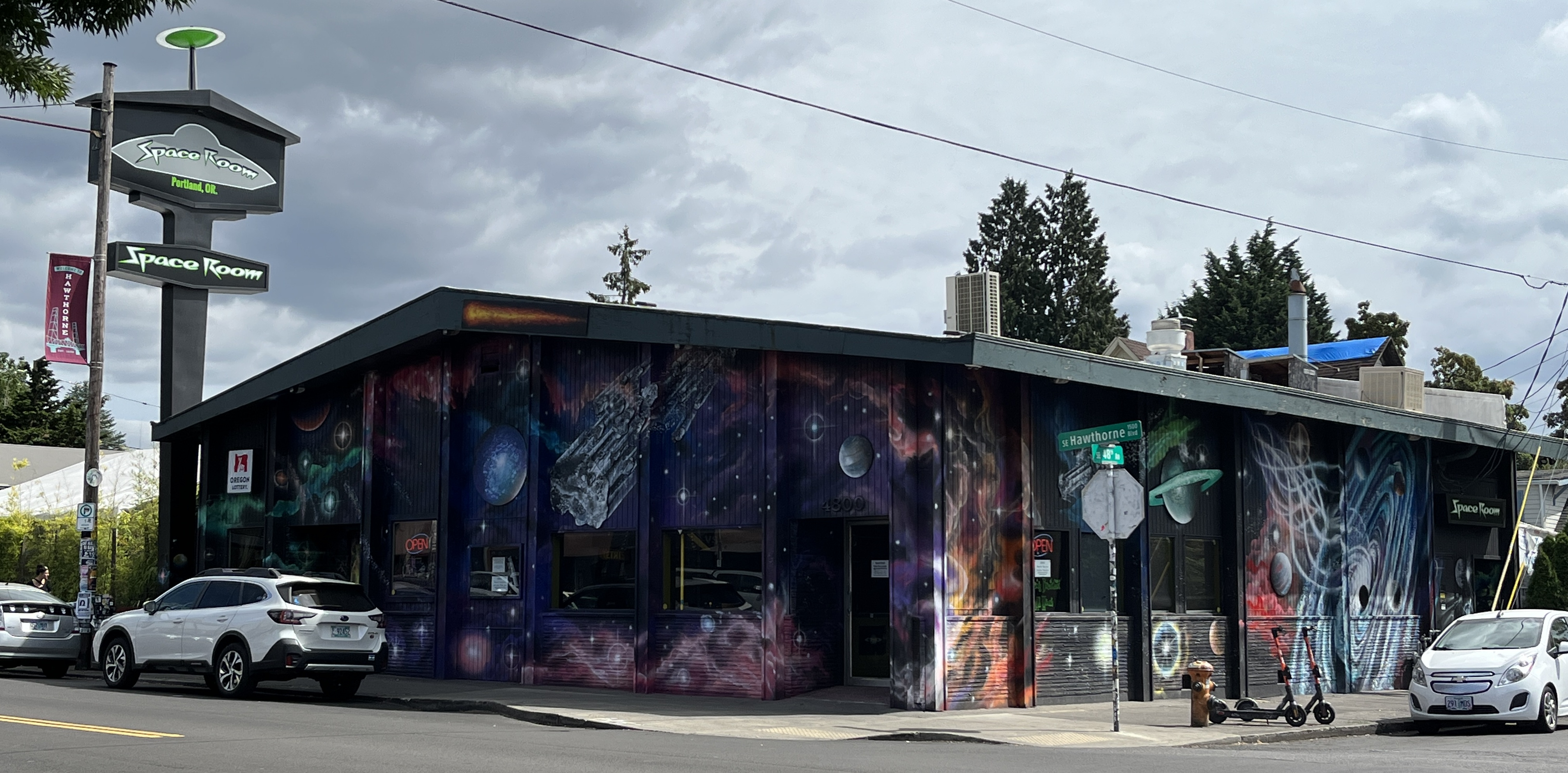
- Exterior, 2022
- Interactive map of Space Room Lounge and Genie's Too

Restaurant information
- Location: 4800 Southeast Hawthorne Boulevard, Portland, Oregon, 97215, United States
- Coordinates: 45°30′42.7″N 122°36′46.4″W
- Website: spaceroomlounge.com

The Space Room Lounge & Genie's Too is a bar and restaurant in Portland, Oregon's Hawthorne district, in the United States.

== Description ==
The Space Room has an outer space theme and a large patio.

== History ==
The Space Room Lounge was established in 1959 and "fused" with the restaurant Genie's Cafe in 2014.

Elliott Smith frequented the bar.

== Reception ==
Willamette Week readers voted Space Room the city's best dive bar in a 2017 readers' poll. The bar ranked second in the same poll's Best Bloody Mary category in 2022.

== See also ==
- List of dive bars
