= Back Stage Bar =

Bar and restaurant in Portland, Oregon, U.S.

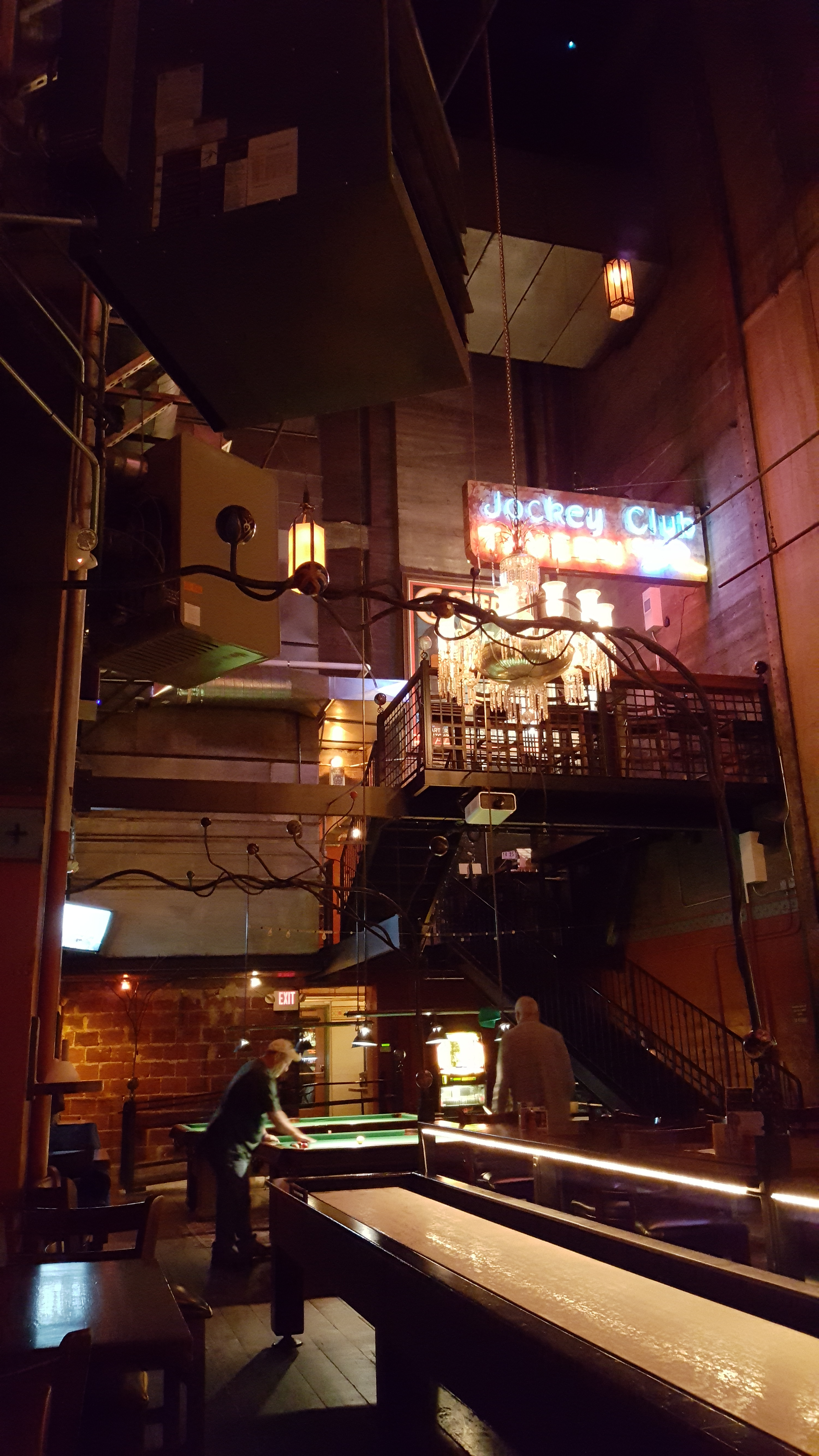
- The bar's interior, 2018
- Interactive map of Back Stage Bar

Restaurant information
- Location: Portland, Multnomah, Oregon, United States
- Coordinates: 45°30′41.5″N 122°37′31.5″W

Back Stage Bar is a bar and restaurant operated by McMenamins in Portland, Oregon, United States.

== Description ==
Back Stage Bar is located behind Bagdad Theatre in Southeast Portland's Richmond neighborhood. The interior has billiard tables, vaulted ceilings, three-story oriental rugs, and a sign from the Jockey Club, a defunct dive bar along North Killingsworth. Portland Monthly says, "If you're not quite ready to run the table, odds are you'll dig the mellow scene at Back Stage Bar, where clusters of cue-wielding Hawthorne hipsters are all in good, groovy moods."

== History ==
In 2017, the 30-foot (9.1 m) long, 19th-century bar previously used at the Lotus Cafe was installed at Back Stage.

== Reception ==
In 2014, Samantha Bakall included Back Stage Bar in The Oregonian's list of "Portland's 10 best bars for games". The newspaper also included Back Stage Bar in a list of the city's 100 best bars.
