= Frances Building and Echo Theater =

Historic building in Portland, Oregon, U.S.

- U.S. National Register of Historic Places
- Portland Historic Landmark
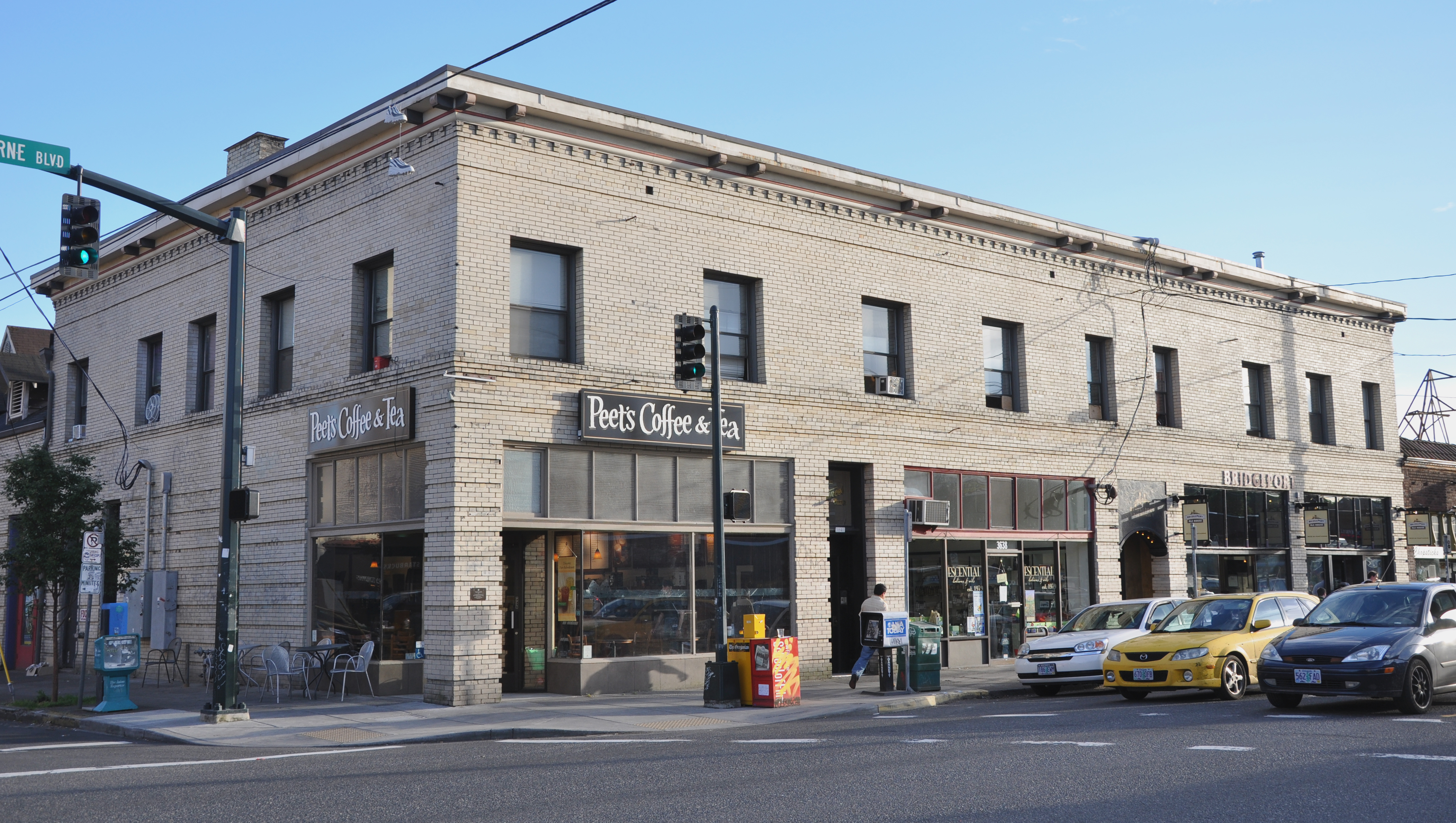
- Frances Building in 2011
- Location: 3628–3646 SE Hawthorne Boulevard; Portland, Oregon
- Coordinates: 45°30′42″N 122°37′34″W
- Area: 0.22 acres (0.089 ha)
- Built: 1911
- Architectural style: Commercial
- MPS: Portland Eastside
- NRHP reference No.: 93001566
- Added to NRHP: January 28, 1994

The Frances Building and Echo Theater in southeast Portland in the U.S. state of Oregon is a property listed on the National Register of Historic Places. Built in 1911, it was added to the register in 1994. The Frances Building is a two-story structure that faces Southeast Hawthorne Boulevard, while the Echo Theatre is a one-story structure facing Southeast 37th Avenue. The adjoining buildings, constructed as parts of a single project, are separated by a party wall.

Investor Rudolph Christman, who financed construction of the project, named the Frances Building in honor of his wife. It was the first commercial structure built along Hawthorne Boulevard between Southeast 20th and 39th avenues. Other commercial development soon followed, enhanced by the growth of nearby residential areas and construction of trolley lines to serve them. The original first floor of the Frances Building was home to a barber shop, and a dry goods store, a candy store, and a drug store. The second floor included offices and living quarters. Through many decades, commerce has continued on the first floor; seven apartments occupy the second floor.

Entered originally from Hawthorne via a passage through the Frances Building, the Echo Theater was a movie house. Facing competition from the nearby Bagdad Theater, which opened across the street in 1927, the Echo Theater closed, and its entrance was moved to 37th Avenue side. Storage and plumbing companies used the space until 1984, when it again became a theater. Echo Theater Company now serves the public by providing access educational circus and circus theater from the beginning to professional level.

== See also ==
- National Register of Historic Places listings in Southeast Portland, Oregon
