= Xico =

Xico may refer to:

== Places ==
- Xico, Valle de Chalco, a town in the State of Mexico
- Xico, Veracruz, a municipality and town

== Other ==
- Xico (footballer)
- Xico (restaurant), in Portland, Oregon
- Xico, a Portuguese nickname for Francisco
