= Jade Rabbit (restaurant) =

Restaurant in Portland, Oregon, U.S.

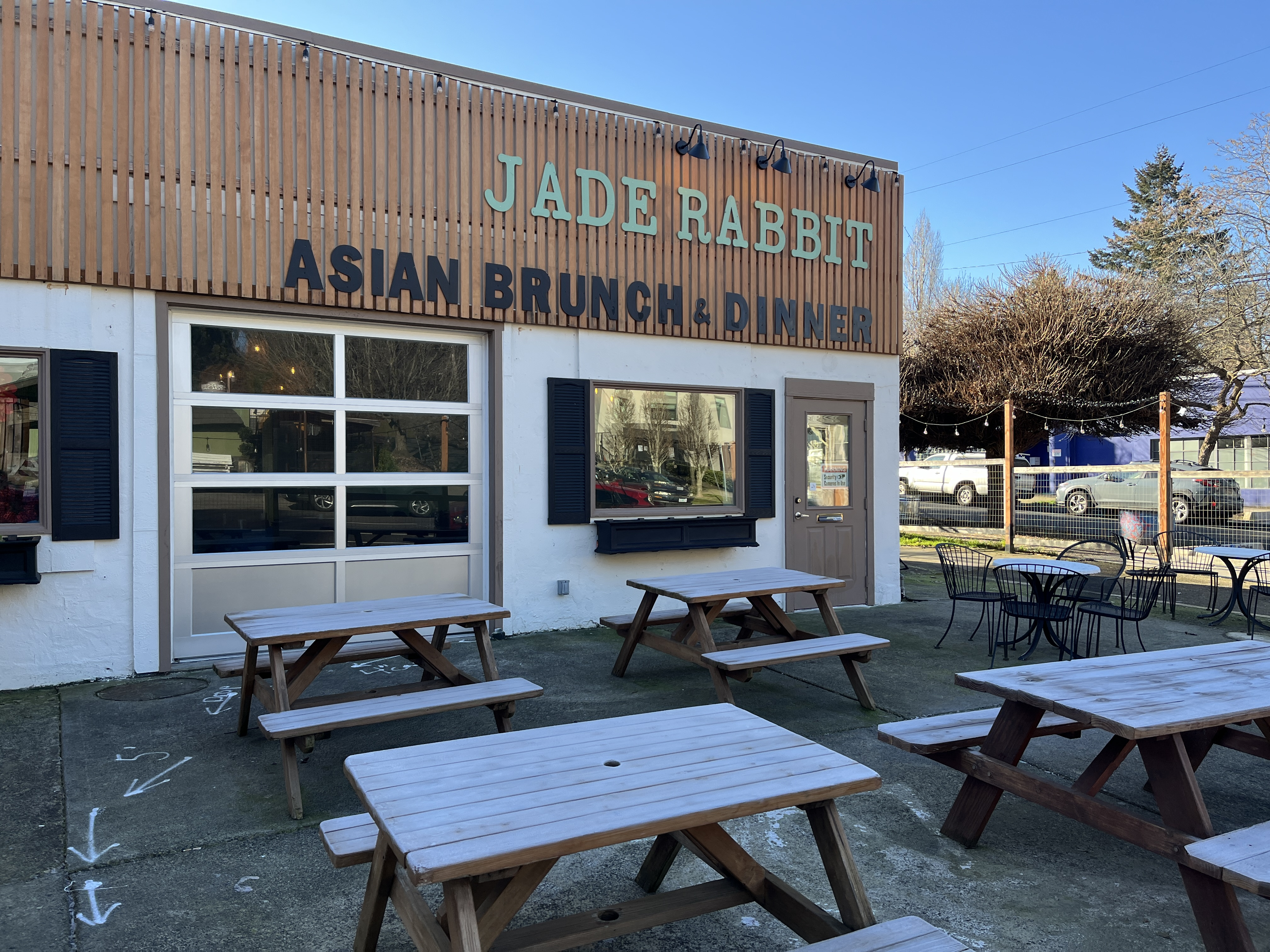
- The restaurant's exterior, 2025
- Interactive map of Jade Rabbit

Restaurant information
- Established: 2017
- Owner: Cyrus Ichiza
- Food type: Asian; Chinese; pan-Asian
- Location: Portland, Multnomah, Oregon, United States
- Coordinates: 45.5119°N 122.6261°W
- Website: jaderabbitpdx.com

Jade Rabbit (formerly Ichiza Kitchen) is an Asian and vegan restaurant in Portland, Oregon, United States. Established in 2017, the business operates on Hawthorne Boulevard in southeast Portland's Richmond neighborhood. Previously, the business operated in the Buckman neighborhood.

== Description ==
The Asian (especially Chinese and also sometimes described as "pan-Asian") and vegan restaurant Jade Rabbit (formerly Ichiza Kitchen) operates on Hawthorne Boulevard in southeast Portland's Richmond neighborhood. Previously, it operated in the Buckman neighborhood.

The menu has included dim sum such as bawan dumplings and cha siu bao, noodle soups, and rice noodles. The Fiery Wind noodle soup has Lan Zhou broth with herbs such as ginger, Sichuan peppercorn, and star anise.

== History ==
Owner Cyrus Ichiza launched Ichiza Kitchen in southwest Portland's Goose Hollow neighborhood in 2017. Like many restaurants, the business operated via delivery and take-out at times during the COVID-19 pandemic. In August 2020, Ichiza announced plans to open an eponymous restaurant as a spin-off of Ichiza Kitchen.

Jade Rabbit later operated as a pop-up at Aimsir Distilling's Emerald Room in the Kerns neighborhood. It now operates at 23rd Avenue and Belmont Street in Buckman. Jade Rabbit was a vendor at the inaugural Veganizer Asian Market in 2025. In August 2026, the business announced plans to relocate to Hawthorne Boulevard. It reopened at 3632 Hawthorne Boulevard, in the Richmond neighborhood, on August 27. The current space has a seating capacity of 70 to 80 people.

Ichiza and Ichiza Kitchen were featured in the book Evolving Vegan.

== Reception ==
Anna Kot recommended Jade Rabbit in Tasting Table's 2023 list of 25 queer-owned vegan restaurants in the U.S.

Waz Wu included Jade Rabbit in Eater Portland's 2024 overview of the city's "most comforting" vegan noodle soups. In 2025, the website's Anastasia Sloan and Seiji Nanbu included the business in overviews of Portland's nineteen best vegan restaurants and best Chinese food, respectively. Eater Portland's Zoe Baillargeon also included Jade Rabbit in a 2025 list of the city's best new restaurants and food carts.

Katherine Chew Hamilton included Jade Rabbit in Portland Monthly's 2024 overview of the city's best Chinese cuisine. The business was ranked the fourth best vegan restaurant in the Portland metropolitan area in The Oregonian's Readers Choice Awards in 2025.

== See also ==
- LGBTQ culture in Portland, Oregon
- List of Chinese restaurants
- List of vegetarian and vegan restaurants
