= Oregon State Hospital =

- U.S. National Register of Historic Places
- U.S. Historic district
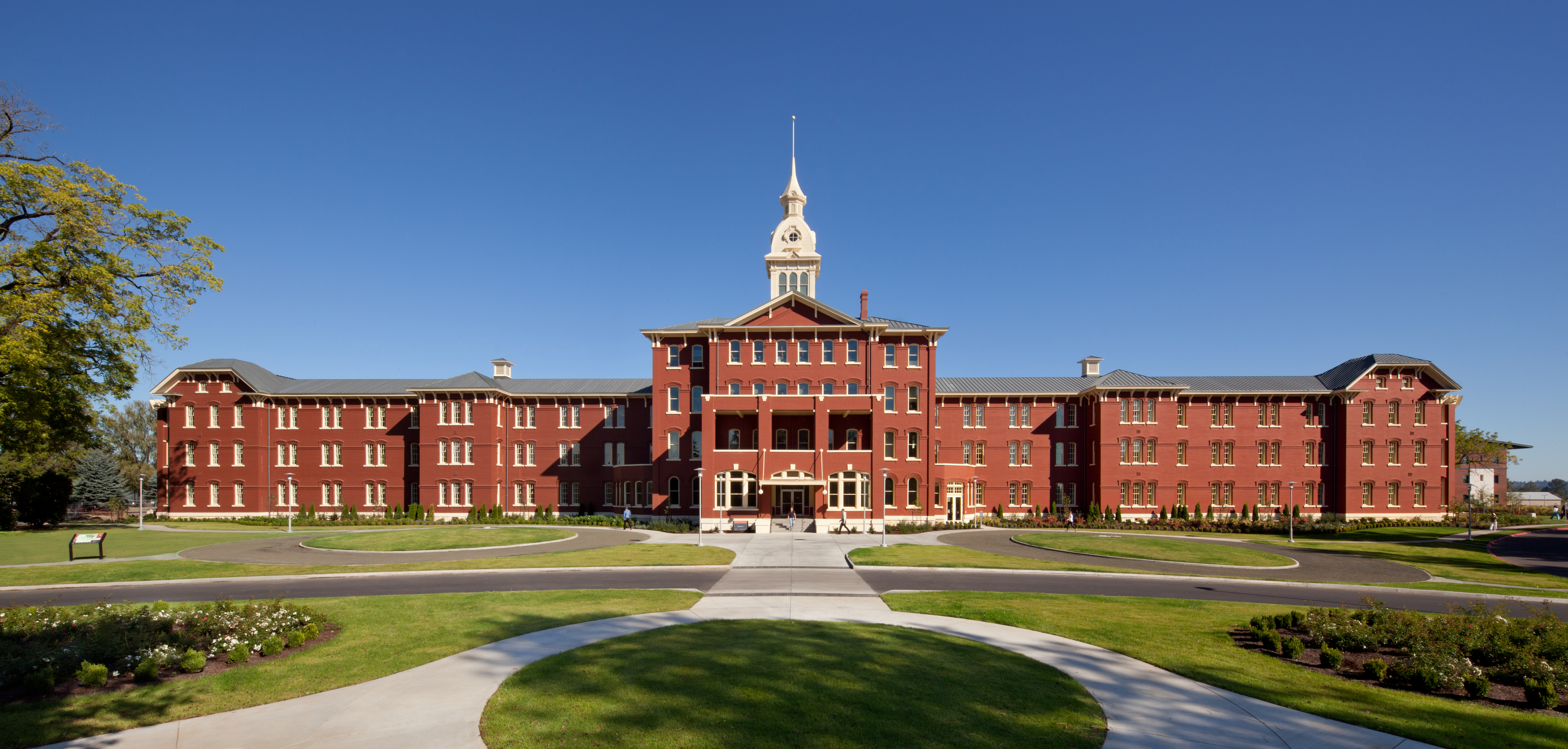
- West facade of the original Kirkbride building of the Oregon State Hospital, 2011

- Location within Oregon Location within the United States
- Location: Salem, Oregon, United States
- Coordinates: 44.93979°N 123.00348°W
- Built: 1883; 143 years ago
- Architect: W.F. Boothby; Edgar Lazarus
- Architectural style: Italianate; High Victorian Gothic
- Website: www.osh.oregon.gov
- Part of: Oregon State Hospital Historic District
- NRHP reference No.: 08000118
- Added to NRHP: February 28, 2008

Oregon State Hospital is a public psychiatric hospital in the U.S. state of Oregon, located in the state's capital city of Salem with a smaller satellite campus in Junction City opened in 2014. Founded in 1862 and constructed in the Kirkbride Plan design in 1883, it is the oldest operating psychiatric hospital in the state of Oregon, and one of the oldest continuously operated hospitals on the West Coast.

The hospital was established after the closure of the Oregon Hospital for the Insane in Portland, located 47 miles (76 km) north of Salem. The Oregon State Hospital was active in the fields of electroconvulsive therapy, lobotomies, eugenics, and hydrotherapy. In the mid-twentieth century, the facility experienced significant overcrowding problems, with a peak of nearly 3,600 patients. In 1961, Dammasch State Hospital opened in Clackamas County near Portland, which served to mitigate the hospital's overcrowding issues. Dammasch would close in 1995.

In the early twenty-first century, the hospital received public criticism for its aging facilities and treatment of patients, and the hospital's management of 5,000 canisters of unclaimed human cremains was the subject of a 2005 Pulitzer Prize-winning series published in The Oregonian. The discovery of these remains is the subject of the 2011 documentary "Library of Dust".

In 2007, the state of Oregon approved a $458 million plan to rebuild the main hospital to a downsized 620-bed facility, (Note: As of the 2013 re-construction, the hospital houses 620 beds. However, throughout its history, the hospital had a varying bed count, peaking at 2,974 beds.) which was completed in 2013. Portions of the original hospital buildings were demolished, though the center of the Kirkbride building was salvaged and renovated, and now houses a mental health museum.

Oregon State Hospital is located in the eponymous Oregon State Hospital Historic District, and was registered with the National Register for Historic Places in 2008. It was the primary filming location for the 1975 film One Flew Over the Cuckoo's Nest, as well as being the subject of a series of photographs by photographer Mary Ellen Mark in 1976.

== History ==
=== 1862–1900: Establishment and early years ===
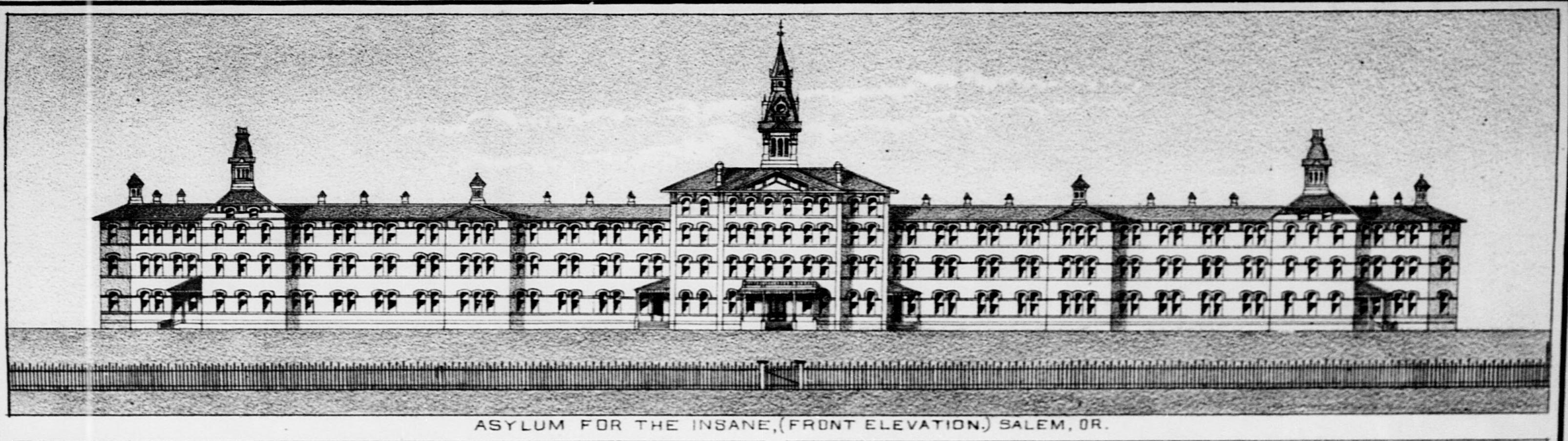
Oregon State Hospital, c. 1881

The original Oregon Hospital for the Insane was established by American physician James C. Hawthorne in what was then East Portland, Oregon, (now the Hawthorne District). The facility was built in 1862, and the street on which it was built was renamed Asylum Avenue. Local residents protested about the name, however, and it was renamed Hawthorne in honor of the hospital's founder in 1888. The street in Salem on which the current hospital is located, Center Street, was also originally named Asylum Avenue. Activist Dorothea Dix was an advocate of Hawthorne's original hospital, which she had visited twice, but was a vocal critic of the opening of the new state hospital, believing the state was ill-prepared to care for patients adequately.

The Oregon constitution mandated that state hospitals be built in the capital city of Salem. Groundbreaking began May 1, 1881, and the hospital was completed in 1883. The newly built, state-funded hospital opened as the Oregon State Insane Asylum on October 23, 1883, and was constructed based on the Kirkbride Plan for a total of $184,000 (equivalent to $6,357,857 in 2025). Its architecture is Italianate in style, and was designed by W.F. Boothby. Dr. Simeon Josephi was appointed superintendent of the hospital from its opening until May 1887, and strived to base his treatment methods on those used by Dr. Hawthorne. He was succeeded by Dr. Harry Lane, who implemented an "aggressive" vaccination program to combat smallpox outbreaks. By 1891, the hospital housed a total of 478 male and 212 female patients; the growing influx of patients led to two additional wings being added onto the hospital, followed by a conversion from gas to electric lighting. Additionally, the hospital infirmary was completed in 1892. In 1896, the most commonly reported causes for insanity at the hospital were epilepsy, intemperance, masturbation, and religious paranoia. In 1900, the hospital began to expand its campus, with two additional women's wards and four men's being added to the main building. According to historical documents, the hospital had admitted a total of 5,046 patients since its opening, 1,243 of which had been "released as recovered", 1,051 "improved", while at least 1,058 had died in the hospital.

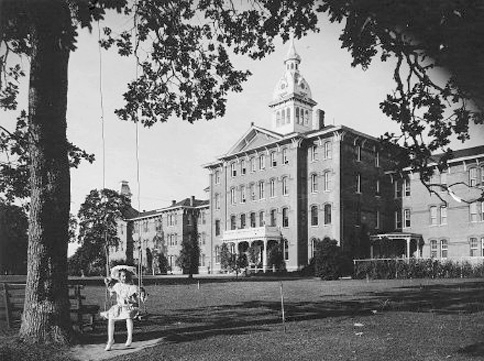
Oregon State Hospital c. 1900

==== Tunnels and narrow-gauge railroad ====
A narrow gauge railroad was established on the grounds of the hospital during its construction, leading into different tunnels and buildings. These tunnels allowed the hospital to move patients between buildings without the public observing and are marked by purple-colored (Note: Old glass manufactured with manganese turns purple in the sun. Historical background available at: Walking Over History: Victoria's Historic Sidewalk Prisms) glass prisms embedded in the roads to provide lighting. The tunnels connect different buildings of the State Hospital together. The narrow gauge railroad did extend to the penitentiary but not within a tunnel; remnants of this line still existed as of February 2009. The State Capitol and associated buildings also have a tunnel system to this day (parts of which are publicly accessible) but they have never been connected to the State Hospital.

While the narrow gauge railroad is no longer used, the tunnels were once used daily to deliver food, laundry, and other items—and occasionally patients—between different buildings. The rails are no longer evident in many places and the flangeways are filled in, leaving only the head of the rail exposed.

At one point transport within the tunnels was by means of electric carts and occasionally bicycles. When the railroad was used, cars made of bamboo were pushed to their destinations. Few spurs or sidings were found on the railroad, so cars were simply stopped on the track where it was necessary to load or unload them, and then pushed away. A number of the bamboo railroad cars were converted to non-rail cars by removing the railroad wheels and adding casters; one of these cars is displayed in the Oregon State Hospital Mental Health Museum.

In addition to the narrow gauge railroad, a standard gauge railroad spur from the Southern Pacific's Geer Branch extended north from the penitentiary to the State Hospital. A portion of the grade of this spur remains along with two short portions of the standard gauge rails embedded in asphalt within and outside of Buildings 61 and 73 on the hospital grounds.

=== 1901–2000: Expansion and overcrowding ===
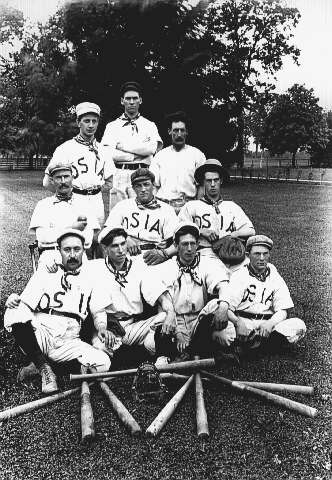
Hospital's men's baseball team, 1901

In 1900, a survey of the hospital's patients revealed a total of 1,188 patients, ranging from the ages of eight to eighty-six-years-old. The most common causes of insanity reported by the hospital at the time were "excessive living", liquor, narcotics, and venereal disease. In 1910, the red brick Kirkbride building was painted white, and in 1913, the hospital was officially renamed Oregon State Hospital. The board and trustees had petitioned for a name change prior; in an 1897 biennial report, it was noted:

[We would] also recommend to your honorable body that the present name of the institution, the "Oregon State Insane Asylum," be changed to "Oregon State Hospital." The disgrace felt by patients, as well as the humiliation of their relatives and friends, would be largely obviated by a correct understanding of the character and objects of the institution, and this would be conserved by the change suggested.

The same year, in 1913, the Eastern Oregon State Asylum was also established in Pendleton. In 1912, the Dome Building, the receiving ward of the hospital, was officially opened, designed by architect Edgar M. Lazarus; at the time, the hospital's number of patients had continued to grow, with around 500 patients entering the hospital each year. The Dome Building incorporated hydrotherapeutic facilities for patients. By 1924, the total number of patients living on the hospital campus had grown to 1,864, with a staff of over 200 employees and 5 physicians. Beginning in 1923, the hospital participated in the eugenics movement, sterilizing a total of more than 2,600 patients until the early 1980s. Common procedures and experimental practices that took place at the hospital included electroconvulsive therapy, insulin shock therapy, and Metrazol shock therapy, the latter two of which were introduced in 1937.

On November 18, 1942, a mass poisoning occurred at the hospital after a dinner serving of scrambled eggs. Within minutes patients complained of stomach and leg cramps, began vomiting, and had respiratory difficulties. Overall, 467 people got sick and 47 people died. Forensic examination determined that the poisoning was due to a mix-up in the kitchen. Instead of powdered milk, sodium fluoride, a poison to kill cockroaches, had been used in the cooking process.

In 1955, the hospital constructed a 676-bed building for geriatric patients to deal with increasing numbers of aging and elderly patients. The hospital's population began to steadily increase in the middle of the century; this led to the opening of Dammasch State Hospital in Clackamas County, near Portland, which was established to help mitigate overcrowding problems. At the time, the Oregon State Hospital had reached a peak number of 3,545 patients. Columbia Park Hospital had also opened in The Dalles in 1959. In March 1966, the hospital added the Salem Rehabilitation Center to its campus with the intention of training long-stay patients into work relationships. The reduction in patient numbers further allowed the hospital to introduce other programs, including a training program for psychiatric nurses, as well as a two-year residency program for physicians to study psychiatry. A volunteer program for local teenagers to work on the hospital grounds was also introduced in 1965.

In 1975, Dr. Brooks, the hospital superintendent, allowed the production of the Miloš Forman film One Flew Over the Cuckoo's Nest to shoot inside the hospital and on its campus. At the time, the hospital's patient residency had been lowered significantly by the openings of Dammasch and the Eastern Oregon State Hospital, which allowed accommodation for the film's production. The following year, in 1976, the hospital established the Child and Adolescent Secure Treatment Program for children, treating patients from age eight to eighteen.

In 1981 and 1983, respectively, the hospital abolished the practice of lobotomy and dismantled its eugenics program. Throughout the 1980s and 1990s, the hospital again continued to experience issues with overcrowding; in 1991, it was noted that the hospital was so overcrowded that beds were placed in corridors and smoking rooms in wards.

=== 2000–2008: Public criticism ===
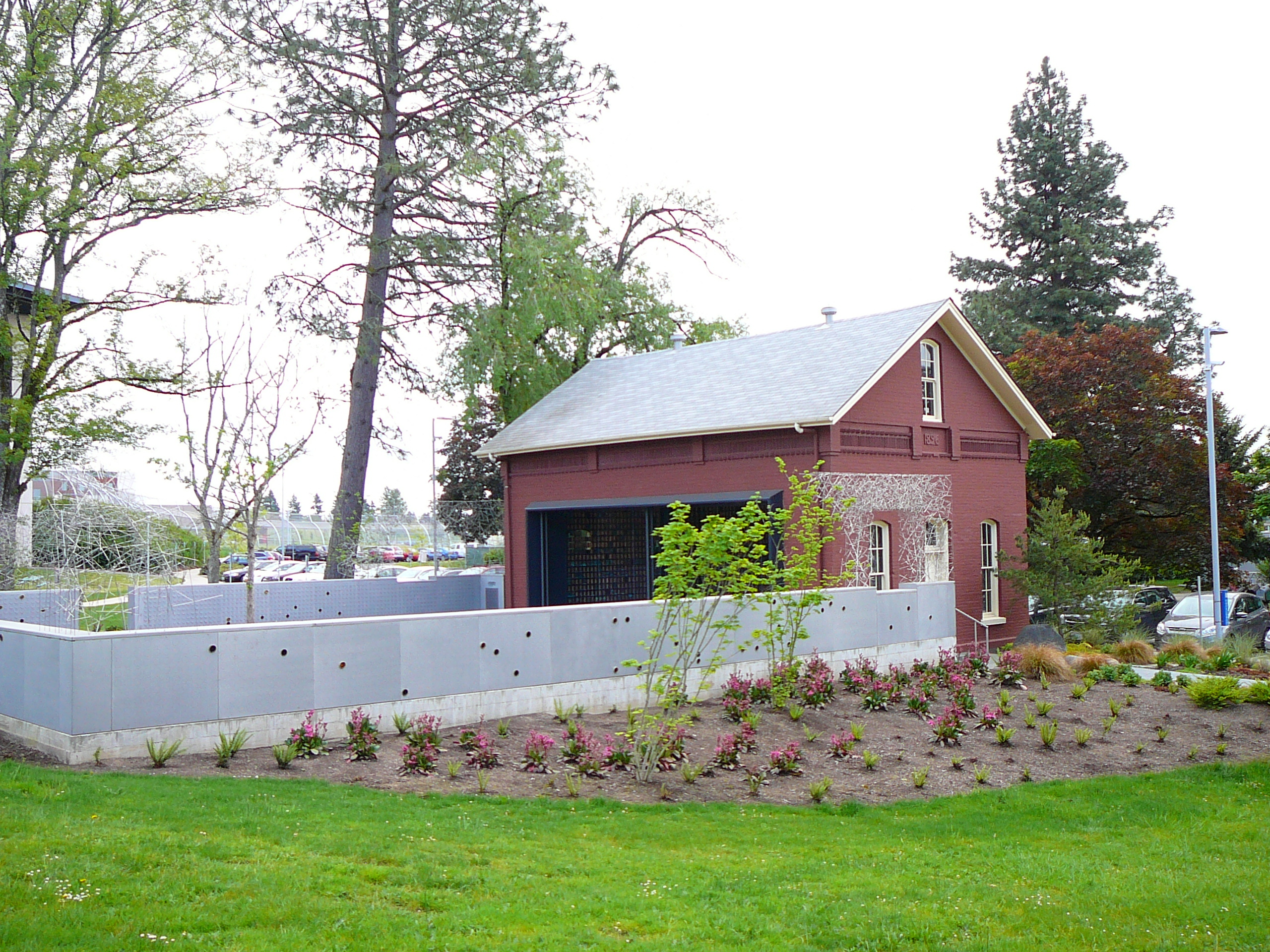
Memorial where cremains from unclaimed patients are kept, 2015

By the turn of the twenty-first century, the hospital began to experience criticism from the public over its aging facilities and patient care. In 2004, the Salem Statesman Journal conducted a two-month investigation into the facility, in which they claimed the hospital's living conditions were overcrowded, also noting outdated facilities. Additionally, the newspaper reported systematic problems resulting in drug addicts and alcoholics being wrongly admitted, as well as severe understaffing and failure of the hospital to properly investigate and prosecute patient assaults against staff members. A 2004 investigation by the Statesman Journal led to further investigation into the hospital, and a 2005 architectural assessment of the facility determined that the site was unsafe. The same year, the hospital's Child and Adolescent Secure Treatment Program was dismantled, and the Oregon Advocacy Center filed a federal suit alleging that overcrowding and understaffing posed a risk to both patients and staff. On August 8, 2006, the hospital was fined US$10,200 for asbestos violations.

Another controversy at the hospital involved the fate of over 5,000 copper canisters of human cremated remains that had been kept in the basement of the original building over a period of decades. The canisters were brought to public attention after senator Peter Courtney came across them while touring the hospital in 2004; the canisters had been relocated to Building 60 on the hospital campus, many of which were corroded and oxidized from moisture exposure. The remains were the subject of a Pulitzer Prize-winning series by The Oregonian newspaper, published in 2005. In 2007, the hospital was granted permission from the state to release the names of the deceased in hopes of returning the unclaimed remains to proper family members. In 2011, Building 60 was renovated and converted into a public memorial housing the unclaimed remains. As of July 2014, state officials had discovered that 1,500 sets of remains may have been lost.

==== Department of Justice report ====
In 2008, the United States Department of Justice filed a report which criticized the quality of care provided to patients by the hospital. A subsequent report criticizing the hospital was largely focused on the death of Moises Perez, a patient with paranoid schizophrenia who had been admitted to the hospital in 1995 after being found "guilty except for insanity" of attempted murder. Perez, who was listed as 5 feet 8 inches (1.73 m) and weighing over 300 pounds (140 kg), went missing on October 17, 2009, and was later found deceased in the hospital; an autopsy confirmed his cause of death as coronary artery disease. The U.S. Department of Justice criticized the hospital's care of Perez and his health, to which the hospital responded with a list of twenty-five significant improvements that had been implemented, including "enhanced patient monitoring, increased medical and nursing staff levels, and new standards for dispensing medication."

=== 2009–present: Reconstruction ===
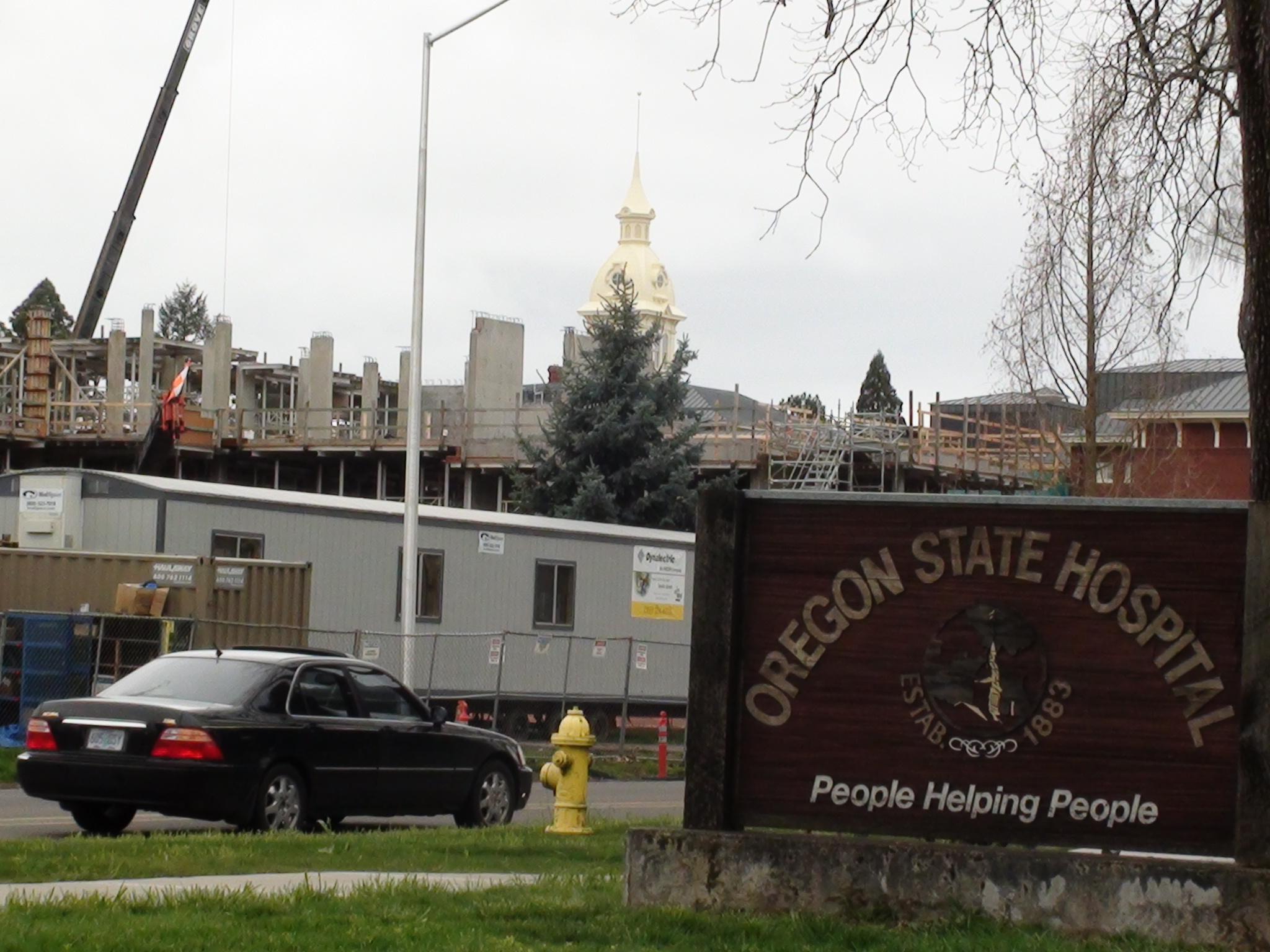
Hospital campus during construction in 2011

Amidst the public and federal criticisms against the hospital, the board and trustees put forth a $458 million plan approved by the Oregon Legislative Assembly in 2007, which called for the construction of a replacement hospital in Salem with as many as 620 beds, as well as a 360-bed facility in Junction City. Portions of the dilapidated, 125-year-old main Kirkbride building were torn down and replaced beginning in September 2008. The same year, the entire hospital campus was listed on the National Register of Historic Places. Construction of the new Salem facility began in 2009, and was completed around 2011; with the Junction City facility being completed in 2013. Salem mayor Janet Taylor has called for the number of beds to be reduced to 320 or fewer, and another hospital facility to be built in or near Portland.

During a 2008 excavation, artifacts from a frontier homestead were uncovered on the grounds of the Oregon State Hospital campus. Recovered items included earthen dishes, glass windows, a canning jar and a lamp chimney. Further excavation will be required to determine if the artifacts are connected to the 1852 homestead of Morgan L. "Lute" Savage. Construction on the new hospital was completed in 2012, with capacity increased to 620 beds. The hospital also created room for the Museum of Mental Health. The museum is located in the Kirkbride Building but it is operated by a non-profit organization that is separate from the hospital administration. It includes history about many of the discontinued practices that are no longer considered proper treatment for mental illnesses as well as updates on current practices.

In September 2022, the hospital settled a lawsuit with disability rights advocates addressing overcrowding at the new hospital, resulting in a federal injunction against new admissions when the hospital is overcrowded. Simultaneously, a state court held the hospital in contempt for failing to admit patients referred to the hospital by state courts. Funding for the lawsuit and settlement, however, came from nonprofits via the Oregon Health Authority which also oversees the State Hospital, so it appears the State of Oregon is suing itself to force policy changes via the federal courts resisted by local district attorneys. Also in 2022, a "contract employee" at the hospital was found abusing a patient - punching the patient several times in the head; however, a training document obtained by The Lund Report hinted the contract employee may have been an inexperienced member of the Oregon National Guard mobilized to assist in hospital operations due to continued overcrowding.

== Population ==
=== Patients ===
A 2005 census of the state hospitals in Oregon (in Salem, Portland, and Pendleton) listed close to 750 patients. In March 2005, the state closed the adolescent treatment ward of the Oregon State Hospital, which now provides services only to people over the age of 18. About two-thirds of the hospital's patients in 2008 had been found guilty of crimes, and also to be insane. Others were a danger to themselves or to others.

=== Administration and personnel ===
Stan Mazur-Hart was the hospital's administrator from 1991 to 2004, followed by Marvin Fickle, who served from 2004 to 2008. Greg Roberts served as the Superintendent from 2008 to 2018, with deputy Superintendent Nena Strickland was an Interim Superintendent of Oregon State Hospital (effective April 2, 2010); Strickland succeeded Roy J. Orr, who resigned at the request of Richard Harris, then Deputy Director of Addictions and Mental Health, following the release of a state report which concluded that the hospital failed to provide adequate care and treatment for patient Moises Perez. Orr had been Superintendent since February 25, 2008. Harris, head of Oregon Health Authority's Addictions and Mental Health Division, held responsibility for state hospitals in Salem, Portland and Pendleton, in addition to the staff who work with county governments to deliver statewide mental-health and addiction services. On February 1, 2018, the Oregon Health Authority announced the appointment of Dolores Matteucci as the hospital's new superintendent.

== In culture ==
The hospital was used as a primary filming location for Miloš Forman's Academy Award-winning 1975 film One Flew Over the Cuckoo's Nest. In 1976, photographer Mary Ellen Mark and writer Kay Folger Jacobs were commissioned by The Pennsylvania Gazette to do a story on the hospital. Mark and Folger spent over a month living in a security ward amongst female patients, chronicled in "Ward 81", a collection of photographs published by Mark.

== Notable patients ==
- Richard Brautigan, American novelist, poet and short story writer
- Jerry Brudos, serial killer
- Roy DeAutremont, bank robber, was lobotomized at the hospital
- Ward Weaver III, murderer

== See also ==
- Fairview Training Center
- Oregon State Hospital Historic District
- Oregon Hospital for the Insane (Portland)

== Works cited ==
- Architectural Resources Group, Inc. (2009). "Narrow-Gauge Rail Lines and Building 73" (PDF). Oregon State Hospital–Salem Historical Review. Oregon State Department of Human Services.
- Biennial Report: Oregon State Insane Asylum (Report). Salem, Oregon: W.H. Leeds. 1987 – via Google Books.
- Goeres-Gardner, Diane L. (2013a). Oregon Asylum. Images of America. Arcadia Publishing. ISBN 978-0-738-59988-5.
- Goeres-Gardner, Diane L. (2013b). Inside Oregon State Hospital: A History of Tragedy and Triumph. The History Press. ISBN 978-1-626-19040-5.
