= Oregon Hospital for the Insane =

Former hospital in the United States

This is about the privately-owned facility in Portland (1859–1883), not to be confused with Oregon State Hospital in Salem (established 1883).

The enlarged second iteration of the Oregon Hospital for the Insane, built in 1862 after the hospital became official contractor for the state of Oregon

Oregon Hospital for the Insane was a facility constructed in Portland, Oregon, United States, by medical doctors J. C. Hawthorne and A. M. Loryea. Launched in 1859 as Oregon Hospital, the facility later came to specialize in the treatment of mental illness and served as the de facto insane asylum for the state of Oregon under contract with the Oregon Legislature beginning in 1861.

Legislation passed in 1880 led to the launch of the state-owned Oregon State Insane Asylum (today's Oregon State Hospital) in Salem in 1883.

== History ==
=== Background ===
Ad announcing the establishment of Hawthorne and Loryea's "Oregon Hospital" in The Oregonian, issue of September 3, 1859

The Oregon Territory became the state of Oregon on February 14, 1859, when President James Buchanan signed enabling legislation into law. At the time of admission into the union, the state of Oregon had a population of a mere 50,000 people — fewer than 3,000 of whom lived in Portland — and sparse medical resources to match.

=== Creation ===
Pioneer physician J. C. Hawthorne, and "surgeon" A. M. Loryea determined to pool their talent in 1859 with the August launch of "Oregon Hospital," a facility in which both would reside. The hospital was originally located on Portland's Taylor Street, between 1st and 2nd Avenues. From the time of launch the hospital was dedicated to the treatment of non-contagious disease.

The hospital seems to have quickly gained support of the Oregon legislature as a semi-official facility for the maintenance and treatment of the mentally ill, with the press reporting in September 1861 that Hawthorne and Loryea were coordinating the contribution of "books for the use of the insane," with materials received to be held in trust as property belonging to the state of Oregon. From approximately that date Hawthorne and Loryea's Oregon Hospital became known as Oregon Hospital for the Insane.

The 1862 Oregon Legislature instructed Governor A. C. Gibbs to select a location in Salem for a permanent state hospital for the insane. This instruction was set aside, however, with contracting with the Oregon Hospital for the Insane in Portland seen as the more economical option for the state. A contractual relationship was established in which the state of Oregon paid a set per capita fee for the housing of "indigent insane and idiotic persons" committed to the facility by the courts.

Buoyed by state financial support, Oregon Hospital for the Insane was moved to a new permanent home in 1862, a building located on "Asylum Avenue" (today's Hawthorne Boulevard) on Portland's East Side, near SE 12th Avenue.

In 1872 co-founder of the hospital A.M. Loryea, nearly two decades Hawthorne's junior, sold his half of the enterprise to his partner and entered into the patent medicine business under the business name "Oregon Medical Laboratory", marketing a nostrum prepared from "Unk weed" said to ameliorate arthritis. Thereafter the facility was owned by Hawthorne alone and its fortunes were intractably bound up with his.

=== Description ===
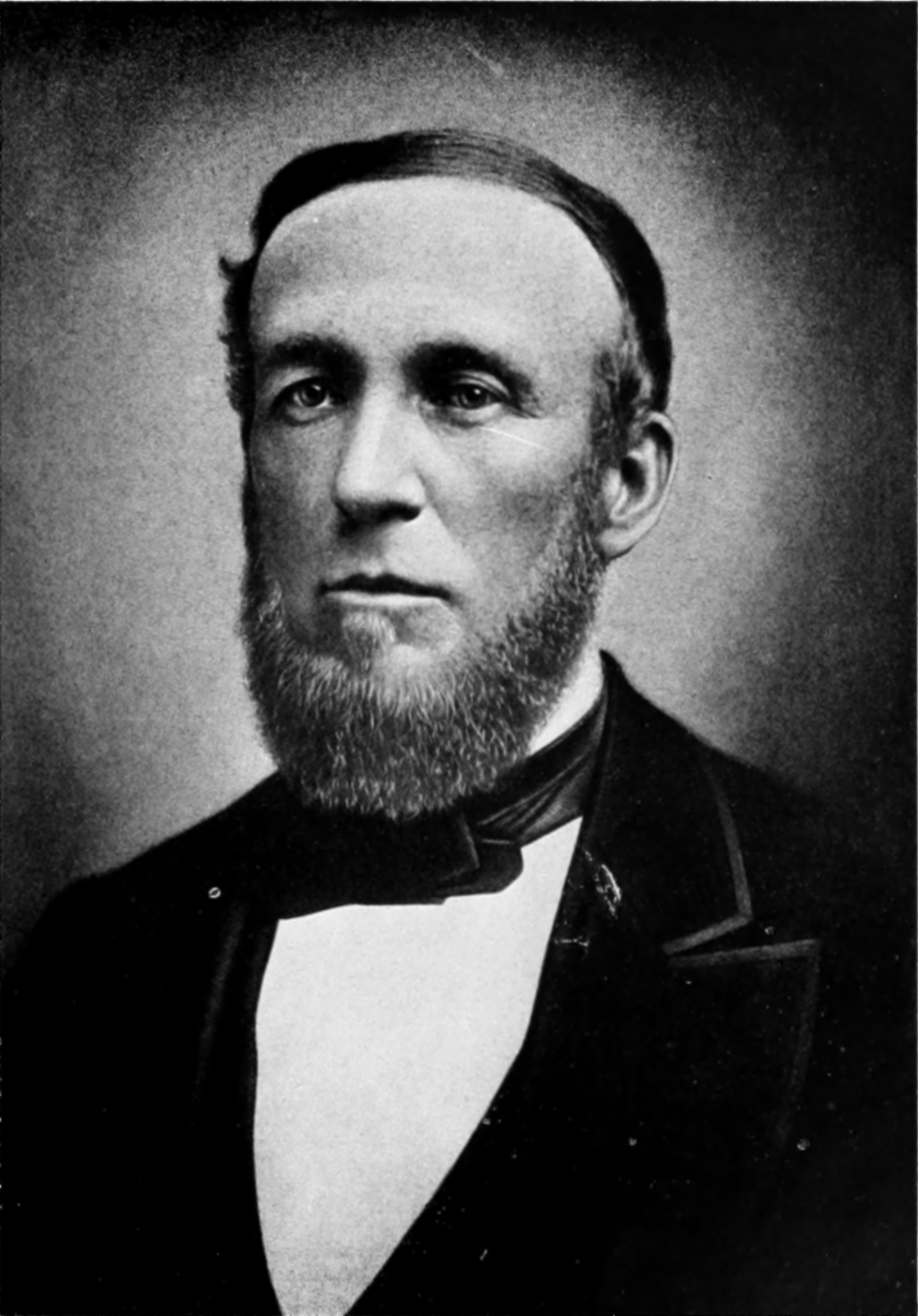
Physician J. C. Hawthorne was one of the co-founders of Oregon Hospital in 1859.

A physician visiting the Oregon Hospital for the Insane in 1868 noted that the hospital was divided into wards, each with a toilet and bathroom supplied with hot and cold water. Patients ate in a common dining room, supplied by a single kitchen and the medical staff was supported by a well-stocked dispensary.

Each bedroom in the great building contained one or two beds, supplied with linen and blankets. Residents were served a variety of fresh and salted meats, fruit, vegetables, and bread, along with coffee and tea. Water was provided from a nearby spring, stored in a high water tower capable of supplying any part of the building.

In 1866 several acres surrounding the hospital had been enclosed with a high board fence, allowing increased opportunities for exercise and recreation for the facility's patients. Women were put to work sewing and knitting and were responsible for the greater part of the clothing used at the hospital. Those men able to work were assigned tasks on the hospital's own farm and gardens.

Corporal punishment was forbidden at the facility in favor of what were considered in the day to be "kind but firm treatment," including the use of strait jackets and confinement to quarters. J.C. Hawthorne was particularly singled out for his efficiency in the hospital's operation, including his "uniform kindness to the large number whose maladies will never admit of cure, but whose management has been entrusted to his care."

=== Criticism ===
Following 1862 legislation contracting with the state of Oregon, Hawthorne and Loryea briefly marketed their expanded operation as the "Oregon State Insane and Idiotic Asylum".

Although privately owned and operated, the Oregon Hospital for the Insane was almost exclusively funded through its state contract, with one official report showing that 162 out of 167 total patients present at that time were there through agency of the state. Of the nearly 300 people who had been housed in the hospital from September 1872 to 1874, men accounted for just under 70% of the population, women about 30%.

According to terms of 1874 legislation contracting with Hawthorne, the state of Oregon was to pay $6 per week for each individual consigned to the hospital.

The $6 per week rate was regarded by some as grossly excessive, with the Salem Statesman opining that such a fee represented an "outrageous extortion," and that Hawthorne was effectively being granted a "life franchise of the Insane Asylum" by his legislative supporters. With a view to pushing the legislature to found a state-owned hospital for the mentally ill in Salem, hometown of the newspaper, the editorialist berated Dr. Hawthorne as "wholly unknown outside of Oregon" and prominent within the state's boundaries "chiefly through the enormity of his bills and the power and continuity of his suction as an official vampire."

Behind the purple prose and local self-interest of the Statesman editorialist, there appears to have been merit to the basic complaint that Oregon's cost of treatment of the mentally ill was relatively costly, with the Oregon Hospital for the Insane's annual per capita cost topping a list of 49 facilities in one 1878 report — some 40% higher than the average for these institutions.

There was merit as well in the related charge that Oregon Hospital for the Insane's contract with the state was enabled by Hawthorne maintaining friends in high places, with the wife of 1870s Governor LaFayette Grover later testifying in an unrelated trial that her husband had used his influence as governor to forestall building of a state-owned asylum on behalf of his personal friend Hawthorne.

=== Legislatory change ===
The attack on costliness and cronyism was taken up in the halls of the state capitol, with the Marion County (Salem) delegation leading the charge. Defenders of the status quo managed to defeat a series of proposals for construction of a new state-owned mental hospital until a shifting of the tide at the legislature's September 1880 session, spurred by the Marion County delegation's decision to focus action on passage of their "pet measure."

The junior member of the six member Marion County delegation and future Governor of Oregon T. T. Geer later recalled the financial imperative for change in the system of Oregon's treatment of the mentally ill, with Dr. Hawthorne and his previous partner said to have amassed fortunes through contracts which had been "let at exorbitant figures." "All efforts to break up this system had been unsuccessful," Geer claimed, thus costing the people of Oregon thousands of dollars each year over expected costs under state ownership and management.

A bill was drafted and introduced by Tilmon Ford, head of the Marion County delegation. A heated legislative battle ensued, remembered by Geer as "one of the most bitterly contested struggles in the history of the Oregon Legislatures," complete with organized caucuses and heated back room negotiations. Speaker of the House Z. F. Moody of Wasco County was credited by Geer for having played an instrumental role in ensuring passage of the bill. Unsuccessful opposition to the bill for the new Oregon State Hospital was headed by A. J. Lawrence, an attorney from Baker County.

The state-owned Oregon State Insane Asylum in Salem built as a result of the 1880 legislature's enabling legislation was opened in 1883. With its opening, the state's financial relationship with the Oregon Hospital for the Insane in Portland came to an end.

=== Termination and legacy ===
J.C. Hawthorne died in February 1881 leaving ownership of the hospital in the hands of his wife. Dr. Simeon Josephi took over the operation of the hospital from the time of Hawthorne's death until the completion of the Oregon State Insane Asylum in Salem. Control of the patients at the Portland hospital were transferred to state officials in October 1883, with the 268 male and 102 female patients then housed at the facility transported by rail aboard a special O&C train from Portland to Salem on October 23, 1883.

Hawthorne's hospital is remembered as one of the most progressive American mental health facilities of its era. The hospital was marked by empathetic medical treatment and concern for the health and well-being of patients by allowing them to work in the fresh air, raising vegetables and livestock, thereby helping them to maintain a sense of purpose.

The bodies of destitute patients of Oregon Hospital for the Insane were interred at Lone Fir Cemetery in Portland, the final costs of which were borne by J.C. Hawthorne out of pocket.

== See also ==
- Hawthorne Boulevard
- Oregon State Hospital
