= A. M. Loryea =

American businessman

Abraham "Abram" M. Loryea (1839–1893), commonly known as A.M. Loryea, was an American pioneer medical doctor, businessman, and politician in the states of Oregon and California. Loryea is best remembered as a co-founder of the Oregon Hospital for the Insane in 1859 and as the Superintendent of that state-subsidized facility for many years as well as the elected mayor of East Portland, Oregon.

After selling his share of the Oregon Hospital for the Insane to his business partner, J. C. Hawthorne, Loryea became involved in a failed business venture as a patent medicine manufacturer. He later traveled extensively, becoming interested in balneotherapy and opening the first Victorian Turkish baths in San Francisco.

== Biography ==
=== Early years ===
Abraham M. Loryea was born March 21, 1839, at Charleston, South Carolina.

Loryea attended the Medical College of the State of South Carolina, from which he graduated in 1858.

Immediately after his graduation Loryea was immediately set to work in Richmond, Virginia, attempting to abate an epidemic of yellow fever that was sweeping the city. Loryea's work was so appreciated by the local medical society that he was presented with an engraved goblet at the end of the crisis as a token of its appreciation.

Still a very young man with a sense of adventure, Loryea decided to leave the South to attempt to establish himself on the Pacific coast. He traveled to San Francisco, where he met James C. Hawthorne, a Pennsylvania-born physician nearly two decades his senior who had gone to California during the California gold rush and who had recently completed two terms in the California State Senate as the Senator from Placer County. The pair resolved to set up a partnership in small town of Portland in the new state of Oregon.

=== Asylum administrator ===
Ad announcing the establishment of Hawthorne and Loryea's "Oregon Hospital" in The Oregonian, issue of Sept. 3, 1859.

In August 1859 Loryea and Hawthorn proudly announced the launch of "Oregon Hospital," a facility in which both would reside. The hospital was originally located on Portland's Taylor Street, between 1st and 2nd Avenues. From the time of launch the hospital was dedicated to the treatment of non-contagious disease.

The hospital seems to have quickly gained support of the Oregon legislature as a semi-official facility for the maintenance and treatment of the mentally ill, with the press reporting in September 1861 that Loryea and Hawthorne were coordinating the contribution of "books for the use of the insane," with materials received to be held in trust as property belonging to the state of Oregon. From approximately that date Hawthorne and Loryea's Oregon Hospital became known as Oregon Hospital for the Insane.

In 1872 Loryea sold his half of the Oregon Hospital for the Insane enterprise to his partner J.C. Hawthorne and turned his efforts to the patent medicine business, launching "Oregon Medical Laboratory" to market a nostrum prepared from "Unk weed" which was said to ameliorate the pain of arthritis. Loryea had been working on the compound for several years, obtaining a patent (No. 116846) for "improvement in medical compounds or bitters" on July 11, 1871.

Loryea was well-regarded in the Portland community and was elected mayor of East Portland. He was also a founder of the upscale Arlington Club in Portland.

During the 1870s Loryea became involved in the banking business, apparently losing money in the process.

=== Turkish bath operator ===
Loryea's patent medicine and banking ventures did not prove successful and his fortune was dissipated, causing him to relocate back to San Francisco. Loryea traveled extensively, visiting Europe and the Middle East, gaining an interest in public baths as an institution. Upon his return to San Francisco, Loryea opened "The Hammam", a Victoran Turkish bath at 11 Dupont Street (renamed Grant Avenue after the earthquake), working in partnership with another local doctor. His business associate, a certain Dr. Trask, soon left the partnership, but Loryea continued to own and manage "The Hammam" for several years, eventually selling it to open a new facility located at 222, Post Street, San Francisco, and another in New York City.

As a well-traveled and active Republican, Loryea became a personal acquaintance of Ulysses S. Grant and President Chester A. Arthur. He was regarded by his peers as courteous, friendly, and polite.

=== Death and legacy ===
A.M. Loryea died April 24, 1893, after an extended illness at the Rural Health Retreat, located three miles outside St. Helena, California. He was 53 years old at the time of his death.

Loryea was survived by his wife Esther, ex-wife Elizabeth Stevens Loryea McCalla, and three grown up children.

At the time of his death, the San Francisco Chronicle reported that Loryea had left a "valuable estate," ostensibly generated by his bathhouses and other business ventures. This was later revealed to be untrue, with the bathhouse registered in the name of his second wife, Esther, and the remainder of his estate consisted of little more than "a gold watch and a few other personal belongings."

The total value of the estate after disbursements was just $430. In his will Loryea controversially left a small amount to an estranged son in order that he might be able to "purchase a revolver with which to blow his brains out."

== See also ==
- J. C. Hawthorne

== Works ==
- Report of the Physicians of the Oregon Hospital for the Insane, for the Years 1867-8. With J.C. Hawthorne. Salem, OR: W.A. McPherson, state printer, 1868.
- The Hammam: Improved Turkish and Medicated Baths: Nos. 11 & 13 Dupont Street, San Francisco Drs. Loryea and Trask, Proprietors. With Edward Trask. San Francisco, CA: Loryea and Trask, n.d. [c. 1875].
- "Reminiscences of General Grant: Grant and the Pacific Coast," Overland Monthly and Out West Magazine, vol. 6, no. 32 (Aug. 1885), pp. 197–198.
