= Xico (restaurant) =

Defunct Mexican restaurant in Portland, Oregon, U.S.

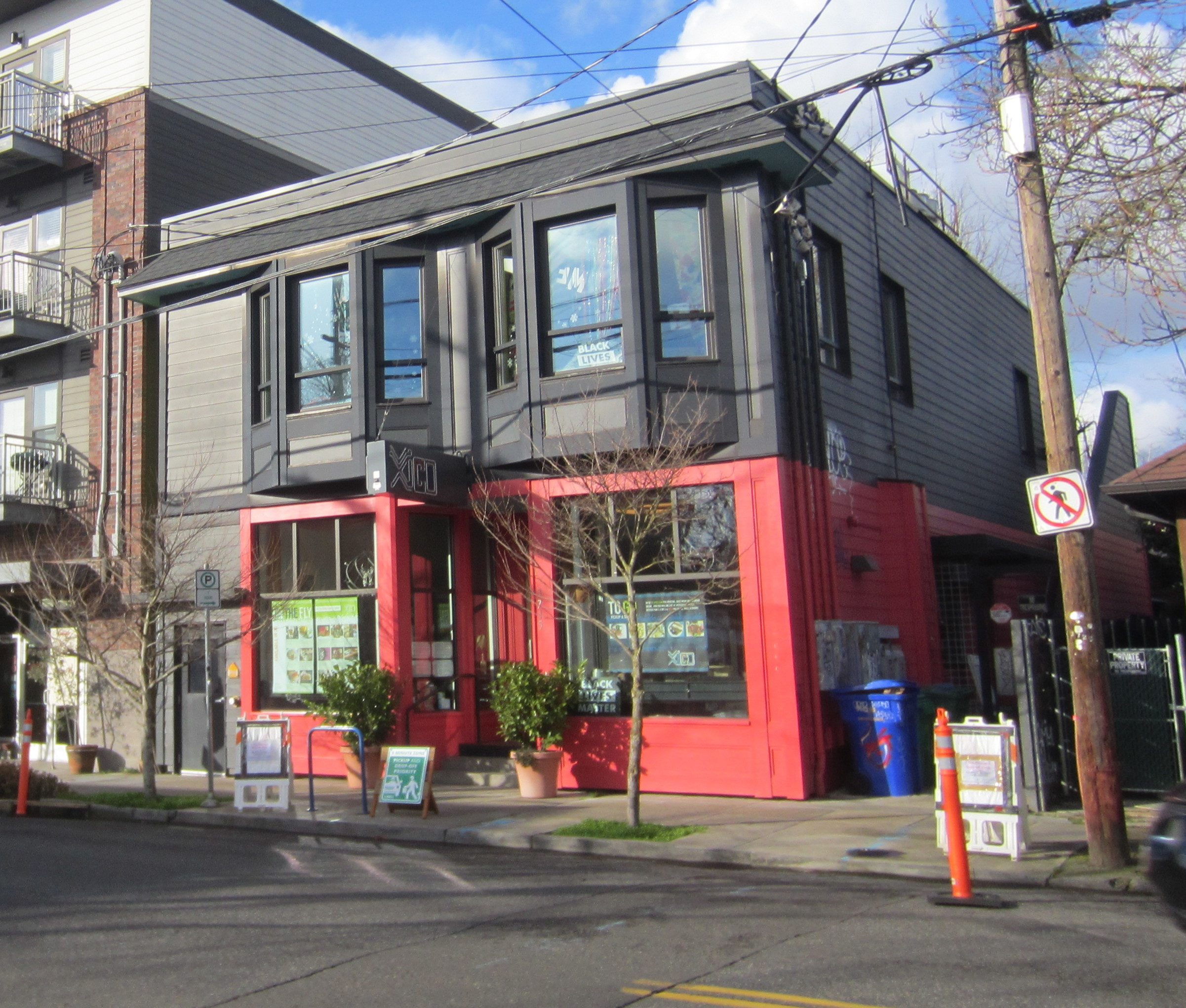
- The restaurant's exterior in 2021
- Interactive map of Xico

Restaurant information
- Established: 2012
- Closed: March 2023
- Owner: Liz Davis
- Head chef: Kelly Myers
- Chef: David Haddow
- Food type: Mexican
- Location: 3715 Southeast Division Street, Portland, Multnomah, Oregon, 97202, United States
- Coordinates: 45.5049°N 122.6252°W

Xico (/ˈtʃiːkoʊ/ CHEE-koh) was a Mexican restaurant in Portland, Oregon's Richmond neighborhood, in the United States. The restaurant opened in 2012; sibling establishment Xica Cantina opened in northwest Portland in mid 2019. Xico closed in March 2023 for financial reasons.

== Description ==
Xico was a Mexican restaurant in southeast Portland's Richmond neighborhood. Eater Portland's Brooke Jackson-Glidden said the "contemporary" restaurant had a "Pacific Northwestern [take] on Mexican food". Xico's queso had chorizo and salsa verde. The drinking menu featured a mezcal collection and a habanero-caramel hot chocolate. As of 2015, the restaurant offered a popular rotisserie chicken dinner for two. Xico began serving lunch in February 2018.

== History ==
Xico opened in 2012 and was owned by Elizabeth Davis, as of 2019. Liz Davis has also been credited as a co-owner, as of 2018. David Haddow was the sous-chef, as of 2016. In 2018, the restaurant's executive chef Kelly Myers suffered a stroke. Michael Russell of The Oregonian described how the community rallied behind her. Myers' quelites recipe is featured in the 2018 cookbook Saving Pan, which was compiled by local students to raise money for the Jane Goodall Institute's Tchimpounga Chimpanzee Rehabilitation Center in the Republic of Congo; the book also features a paper collage inspired by Myers.

In June 2019, the LLC behind Xico, Normal Activity, confirmed plans to open sibling restaurant Xica Cantina along Northwest 23rd. Xica Cantina began operations by the end of the month, and held a grand opening on July 5. In 2019, Willamette Week's Matthew Singer described Xica as the "casual cousin" to Xico. Xico and Xica both offered pickup service during the COVID-19 pandemic, as of May 2020.

Xica closed during the pandemic. Xico closed in March 2023 for numerous financial reasons, including the temporary closure during the pandemic, staff turnover, and rising costs. In 2024, the chain Harlow announced plans to operate in the space previously occupied by Xico.

== Reception ==
In 2016, Willamette Week's Martin Cizmar and Matthew Korfhage ranked Xico first in the "best overall" and "best margaritas" categories in their overview of the "six most bougie taco spots" in southeast Portland. The newspaper's Beth Slovic wrote, "Xico will change how you think about Mexican food". Samantha Bakall of The Oregonian called the restaurant's hot chocolate a "soothing way to finish dinner" in her 2017 overview of the city's "best drinking chocolate". Alex Frane of Eater Portland included Xico is his 2019 list of the city's "most enticing" margaritas.

== See also ==
- Hispanics and Latinos in Portland, Oregon
- List of Mexican restaurants
