= Hawthorne Boulevard (Portland, Oregon) =

Street in Portland, Oregon, United States

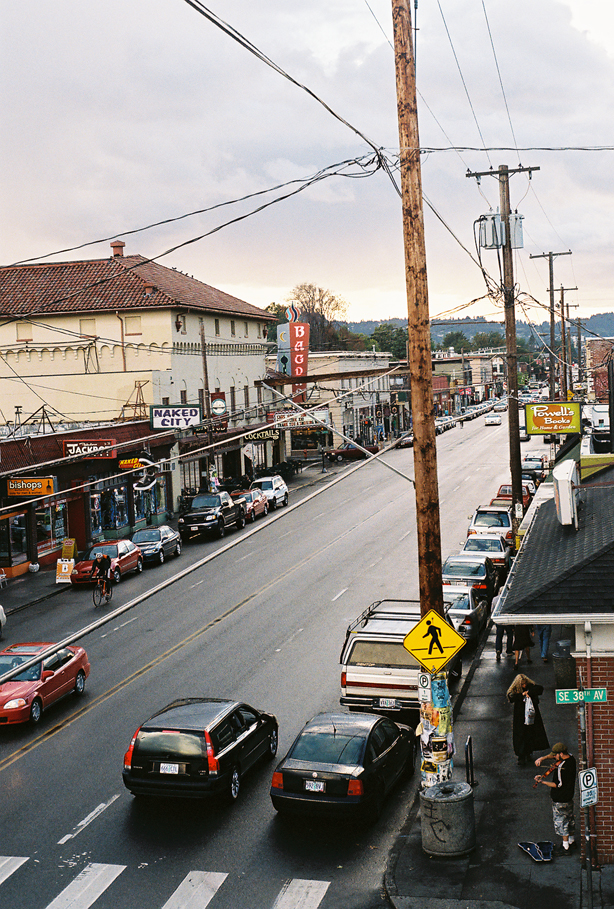
- Hawthorne Boulevard looking west towards Downtown from the Hawthorne Fred Meyer
- Location: Portland, Oregon
- West end: Willamette River
- East end: SE 92nd Avenue

Hawthorne Boulevard is an east–west street in Portland, Oregon, and the dividing line between multiple neighborhoods, although "Hawthorne" is often itself considered its own neighborhood. The street stretches from the Willamette River on the west, (although it continues over the river via the Hawthorne Bridge and becomes Madison Street through Downtown Portland), and 92nd Avenue on the east. Mount Tabor blocks the street between 60th Street and 72nd Avenue. Hawthorne Boulevard is a principal street west of 50th Avenue and a residential street to the east. The most famous portion of Hawthorne Boulevard is between 29th Avenue and Cesar Chavez Boulevard (formerly 39th Avenue) serving as a cultural hot spot for Portland's hippie movement. This section of the street is filled with local businesses, boutiques, restaurants, and gift stores, as well as the first Fred Meyer grocery at 36th and Hawthorne, and a bakery at 12th and Hawthorne. It the grocery closed in the 1930s. Hawthorne Boulevard is often compared to Haight Street in San Francisco due to the similar culture of both streets. The street is named for Doctor James C. Hawthorne, a politician and physician. Dr. Hawthorne donated land for the Oregon Hospital for the Insane near the modern day Colonel Summers Park in 1862. The Hospital for the Insane is often called the Hawthorne Asylum, and the street, originally named U Street, took on the moniker Asylum Avenue. The Asylum closed in 1883, and an ordinance was passed to rename the street to Hawthorne Avenue in 1888.

Anticipation of growth and connection by the Morrison Bridge occurred in the 1880s, leading to land speculation. The bridge opened in 1887, and served Hawthorne indirectly with a streetcar on Morrison/Belmont in 1887, and then directly by the Mt. Tabor Street Railway steam car in 1888. During this time, the centers of activity were "lower Hawthorne"'s 34th to 39th Avenues, and 46th to 50th Avenues, called "upper Hawthorne"; the latter cluster developed where a streetcar line to Foster split off Hawthorne at 50th.

The Madison Bridge opened in 1891, and the street was connected to downtown via streetcar. Portland's eastside was annexed into Portland in the same year.

The street was "completely macadamized" (paved) by 1907, and SE 39th Avenue was improved as part of the Good Roads Movement in 1910. These, as well as other factors, led to the demise of the streetcar, and by 1918 Hawthorne was one of the busiest streets for car traffic in Portland. The sidewalks were narrowed to give room to car traffic in 1931, and the streetcar tracks were removed as part of a WPA project in 1936. That year, the streetcar line became a trolleybus operating as Portland Traction Company. Despite the removal of the lines, mass transit use boomed with the population influx of the 1940s.

Portland's last streetcar, which ran on Belmont up to Mt. Tabor, stopped running in 1948. 39th Avenue was widened in 1950, a traffic light was placed at the intersection with Hawthorne, and the modern Fred Meyer superstore opened in 1951. This led to a significant drop in grocers and butchers along the street.

Notable buildings on Hawthorne include the Spanish Mission Revival Santa Barbara Apartments, and the similarly-styled Bagdad Theater, built in 1927.
