= James C. Hawthorne =

American politician

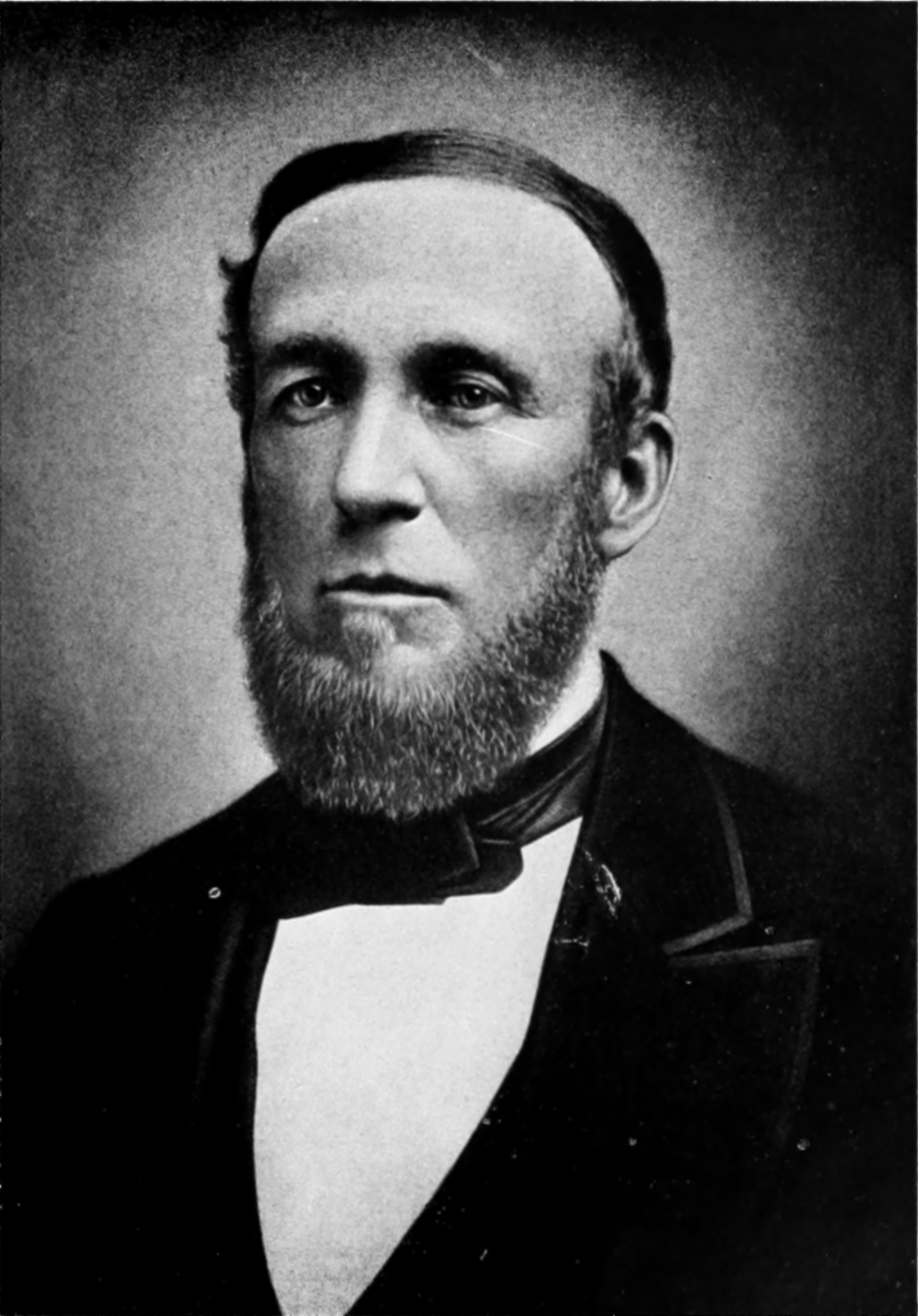

California State Senator
- In office 1854–1857
- Constituency: Placer County

Personal details
- Born: March 12, 1819 Mercer County, Pennsylvania
- Died: February 15, 1881 (aged 61) Portland, Oregon
- Spouse(s): Emma Curry; E. C. Hite
- Education: Medical University
- Occupation: Physician

James C. Hawthorne (March 12, 1819 – February 15, 1881) was an American medical doctor and politician in the states of California and Oregon. A native of Pennsylvania, he was the co-founder of the Oregon Hospital for the Insane in East Portland, Oregon. Hawthorne served in the California Senate and was a member of the Whig Party and later the Democratic Party.

Hawthorne Boulevard in Portland, Oregon is named after him.

== Early years ==
Hawthorne was born on March 12, 1819, in Mercer County, Pennsylvania, to James and Mary (Donald) Hawthorne, who were of English descent. His father was a farmer and a graduate of Washington College, Pennsylvania. J.C. commenced the study of medicine under Dr. Bascom of Mercer, Pennsylvania, and later earned a degree from the Medical University at Louisville, Kentucky.

He commenced practice in Louisville with his cousin, Dr. Hawthorne, continuing until 1850, when he went to California. He then located at Auburn, Placer County, California and engaged in a large general practice and hospital work, where he became widely known and gained a reputation for his professional skill. In 1854 he was elected State Senator from Placer County, and served two terms. (Lansing Stout, another future Oregonian, represented Placer County in California's lower house at the time.)

== Oregon ==
In 1857, he moved to Portland, Oregon, where he was well received by the medical community, and soon acquired a large private practice. In 1858, he took charge of the county hospital under a contract from Multnomah County, subsequently establishing a private hospital for the insane. The hospital was so successful that the state government, during Governor Whiteaker's term in 1862, contracted with him to assume the care of the insane of Oregon. Assisted by Dr. A. M. Loryea, this grew into Oregon Hospital for the Insane. This contract was from time to time renewed by the State Legislature, and until his death Hawthorne had charge as Superintendent and Physician of the unfortunate wards of the state, which at the time of his death numbered some 500 inmates.

Hawthorne was known for his kindness toward his patients and his devotion to his work. During the 21 years that he had charge of the Oregon Hospital for the Insane, it became widely known and was regarded as one of the best institutions of its kind in the United States. Hawthorne was highly proficient in every department of his profession and is highly honored by the record he made as authority upon diseases of the mind. He gained national renown in the treatment of insanity, and the curative rate of his institution was considered equal to that of any similar establishment in the United States.

Hawthorne took an active interest in public affairs. Politically, he was originally a Whig, but after the overthrow of that party he became a Democrat. He commanded respect from members of both parties, and he was retained in office for many years when the state was under Republican rule. He declined to become a candidate for high public stations.

He was a Christian, and for many years was a consistent member of the Episcopal Church. He was a productive and highly regarded man at the time of his death.

== Family and later life ==
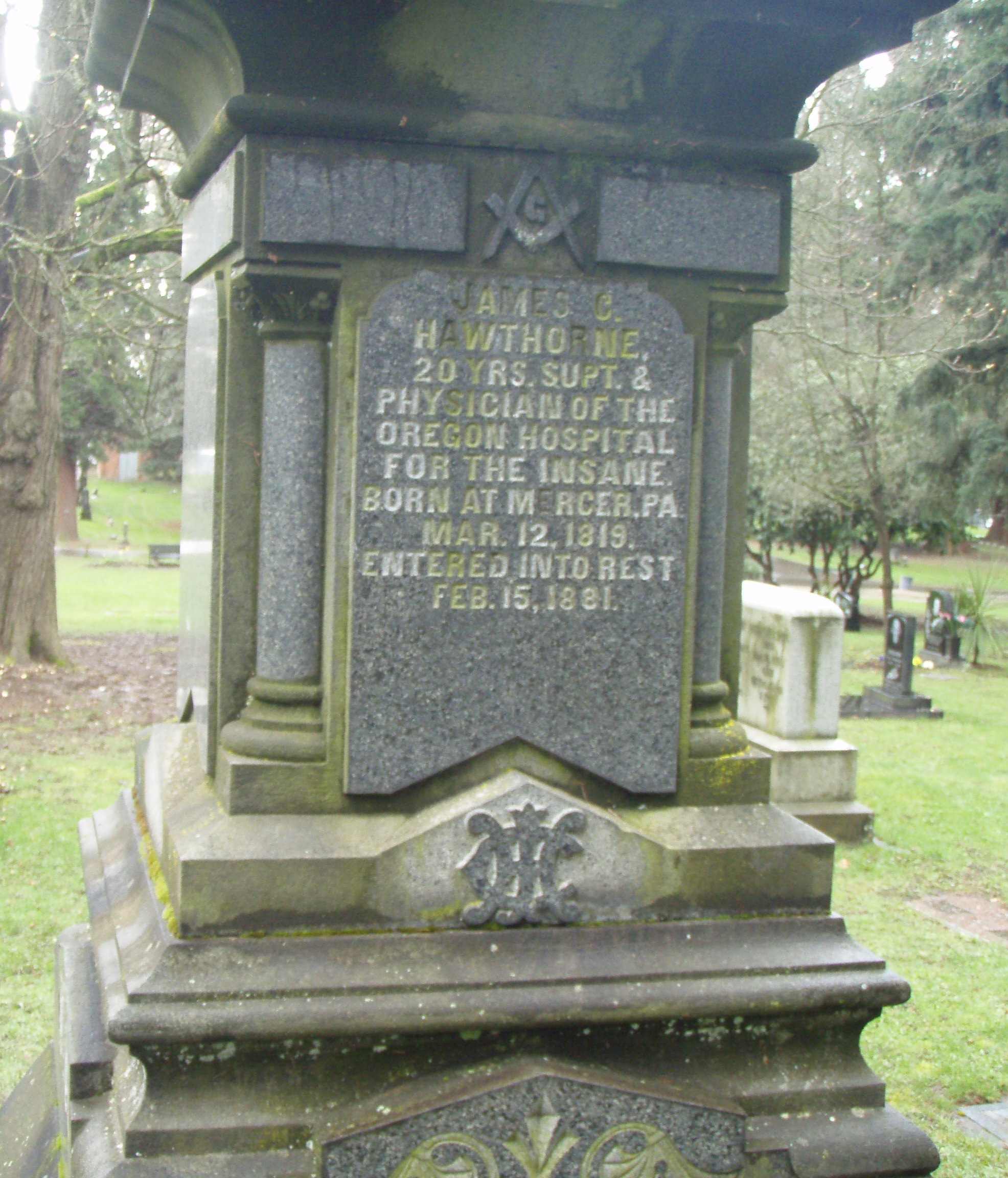
Hawthorne's grave at Lone Fir Cemetery. Many of his patients are buried near his grave.

Hawthorne was twice married. His first wife, Miss Emma Curry, a niece of Congressman Kelly of Pennsylvania, died in Portland in 1862, only a few weeks after their marriage. Hawthorne remarried in 1865 to Mrs. E. C. Hite of Sacramento, California, one of California's favorite pioneer daughters. Their two daughters, Louise H. and Catharine, later inherited large real-estate interests in East Portland, Oregon. James Hawthorne died on February 15, 1881, at the age of 61 and was buried at Lone Fir Cemetery.

== Asylum Patients Memorial ==
A memorial for the patients of the Oregon Hospital for the Insane is being planned by Metro at the Lone Fir Cemetery, where it was recently uncovered that several hundred asylum patients are buried in unmarked graves. Local historians are joining with mental health advocates to shape the memorial area. The gravesite and memorial area adjoins another segregated area for Chinese workers where a separate memorial is planned.

== See also ==
- Oregon State Hospital
- A. M. Loryea
- Hawthorne, Portland, Oregon
- James B. Stephens (founder of East Portland, donated land for the hospital)
- A House, A Home (A song and film inspired by James C. Hawthorne and his patients buried at Lone Fir Cemetery)
