= Oregon State Hospital Historic District =

Historic district in Oregon, United States

- U.S. National Register of Historic Places
- U.S. Historic district
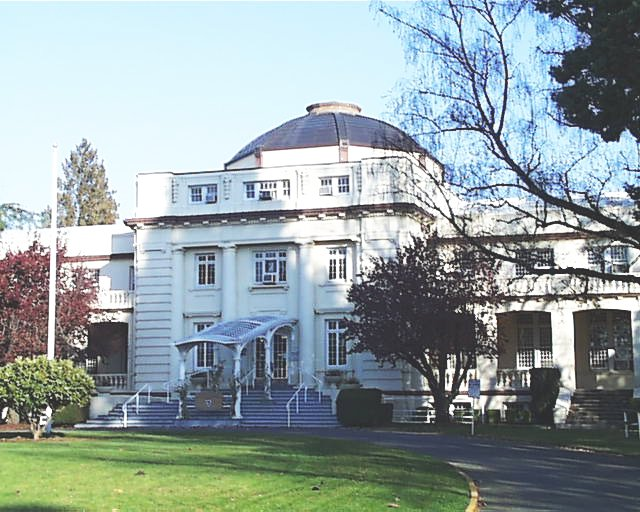
- The Dome Building
- Location: Roughly bounded by D Street, Park Avenue, 24th Street and Bates Drive, Salem, Oregon
- Coordinates: 44.93992°N 123.00260°W
- Built: 1910-1912
- Architect: Edgar M. Lazarus, et al.
- NRHP reference No.: 08000118; 100004300 (decrease)

Significant dates
- Added to NRHP: February 28, 2008
- Boundary decrease: August 23, 2019

The Oregon State Hospital Historic District is a National Historic District in Salem, Oregon, United States. It was added to the National Register of Historic Places on February 28, 2008, and encompasses many of the buildings of the present-day Oregon State Hospital. The district is roughly bounded by D Street, Park Avenue, 24th Street and Bates Drive and includes the main hospital building as well as the former headquarters of the Oregon Department of Corrections, known as the Dome Building, across the street.

The hospital was cited as an example of Kirkbride Plan mental hospital design. More than 60 historic buildings and structures are sited on 130-acre (0.53 km^{2}) campus and are considered excellent examples of institutional buildings designed by Oregon architects, including Pietro Belluschi, William C. Knighton, Edgar M. Lazarus (the designer of Crown Point Vista House), and Walter D. Pugh.

== See also ==
- List of Oregon's Most Endangered Places
