= Santa Barbara Apartments =

Historic building in Portland, Oregon, U.S.

- U.S. National Register of Historic Places
- Portland Historic Landmark
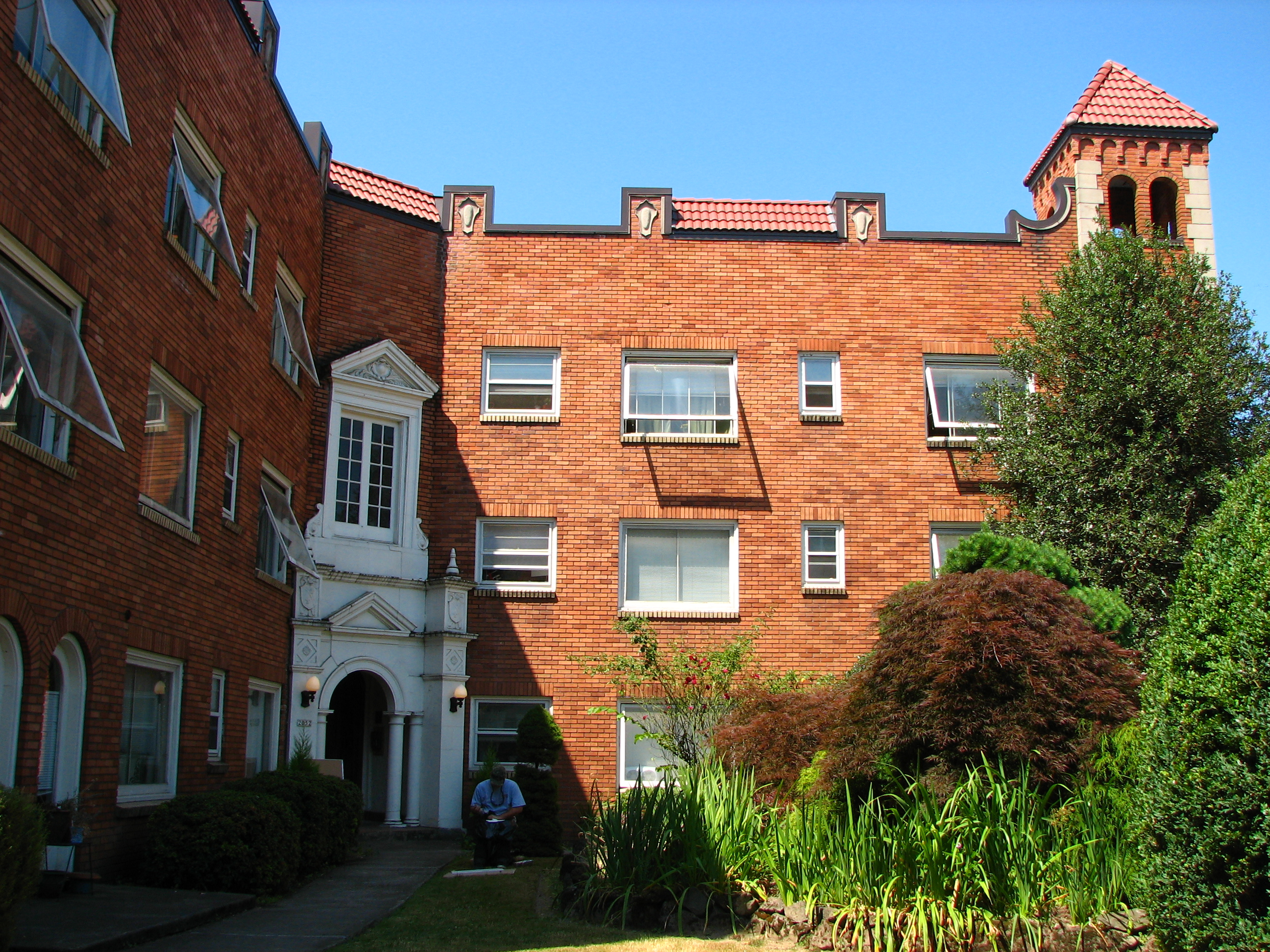
- The Santa Barbara Apartments in 2009
- Location: 2052 SE Hawthorne Boulevard; Portland, Oregon
- Coordinates: 45°30′43″N 122°38′40″W
- Built: 1928
- Architect: Elmer E. Feig
- Architectural style: Mission/Spanish Revival
- MPS: Portland Eastside MPS
- NRHP reference No.: 89000105
- Added to NRHP: March 8, 1989

The Santa Barbara Apartments is a building complex on Hawthorne Boulevard in southeast Portland, Oregon listed on the National Register of Historic Places.

== See also ==
- National Register of Historic Places listings in Southeast Portland, Oregon
