= Genie's Cafe =

Restaurant in Portland, Oregon, U.S.

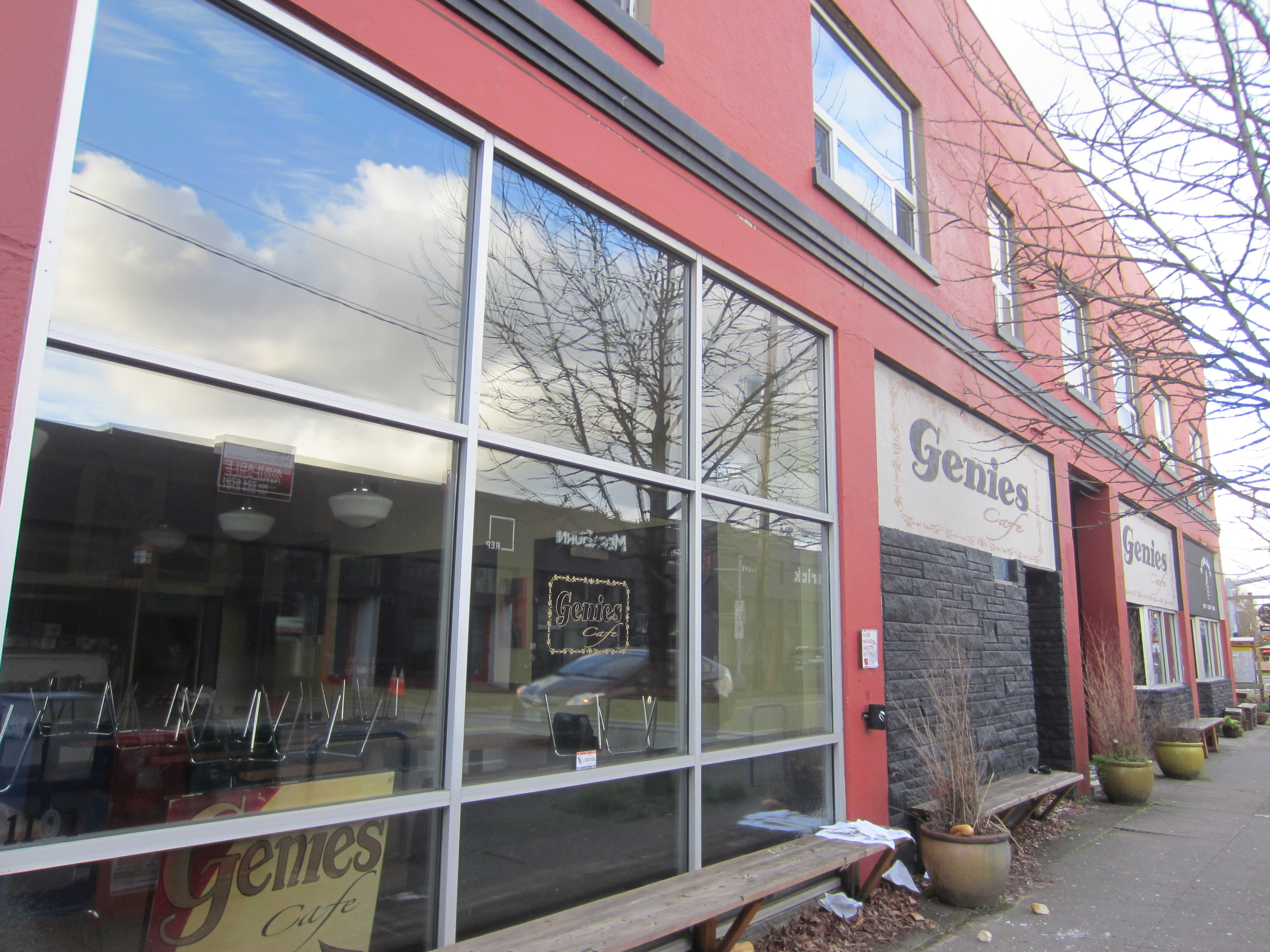
- The restaurant's exterior in 2021
- Interactive map of Genie's Cafe

Restaurant information
- Location: 1101 Southeast Division Street, Portland, Oregon, 97202, United States
- Coordinates: 45.5050°N 122.6544°W

Genie's Cafe, or Genies Cafe, is a restaurant in Portland, Oregon.

== Description ==
The restaurant is located in southeast Portland's Hosford-Abernethy neighborhood.

== History ==
In 2014, Genie's owner Justin Johnson confirmed plans to start operating within the Space Room Lounge and neighboring Brite Spot Diner, creating Space Room Lounge and Genie's Too.

== Reception ==
Genie's was included in The Oregonian's 2008 overview of Portland's best restaurants serving biscuits and gravy. In 2016, Lizzy Acker included the restaurant in the newspaper's list of the city's seven "best pancake spots".

The restaurant was a runner-up and placed third in the Best Benedict and Best Bloody Mary categories, respectively, in Willamette Week's annual readers' poll in 2017. Drew Tyson and Dan Schlegel included Genie's in Thrillist's 2017 list of "The Best Places for Breakfast in Portland".
