= Hawthorne, Portland, Oregon =

Area of Portland, Oregon, U.S.

Coordinates: 45.51245°N 122.62081°W

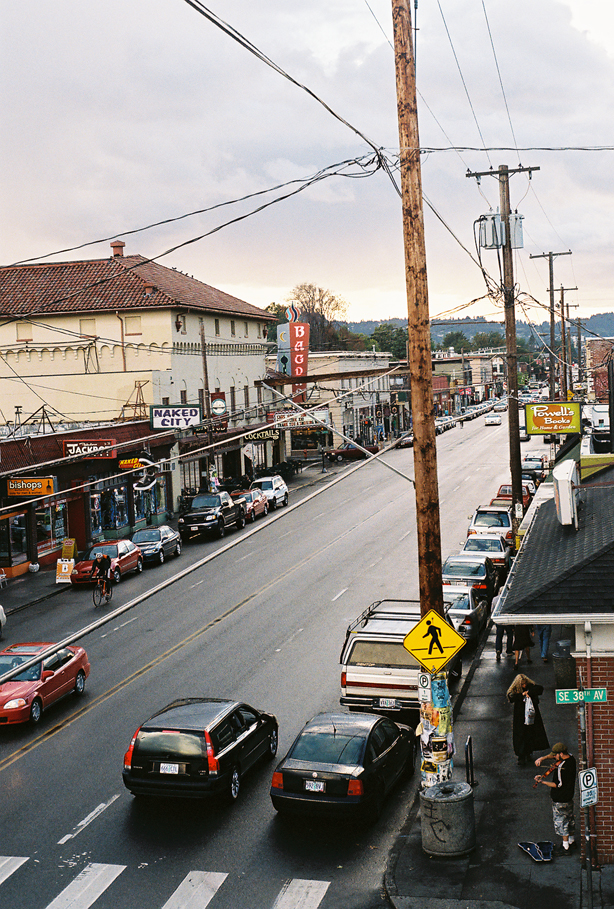
Hawthorne District

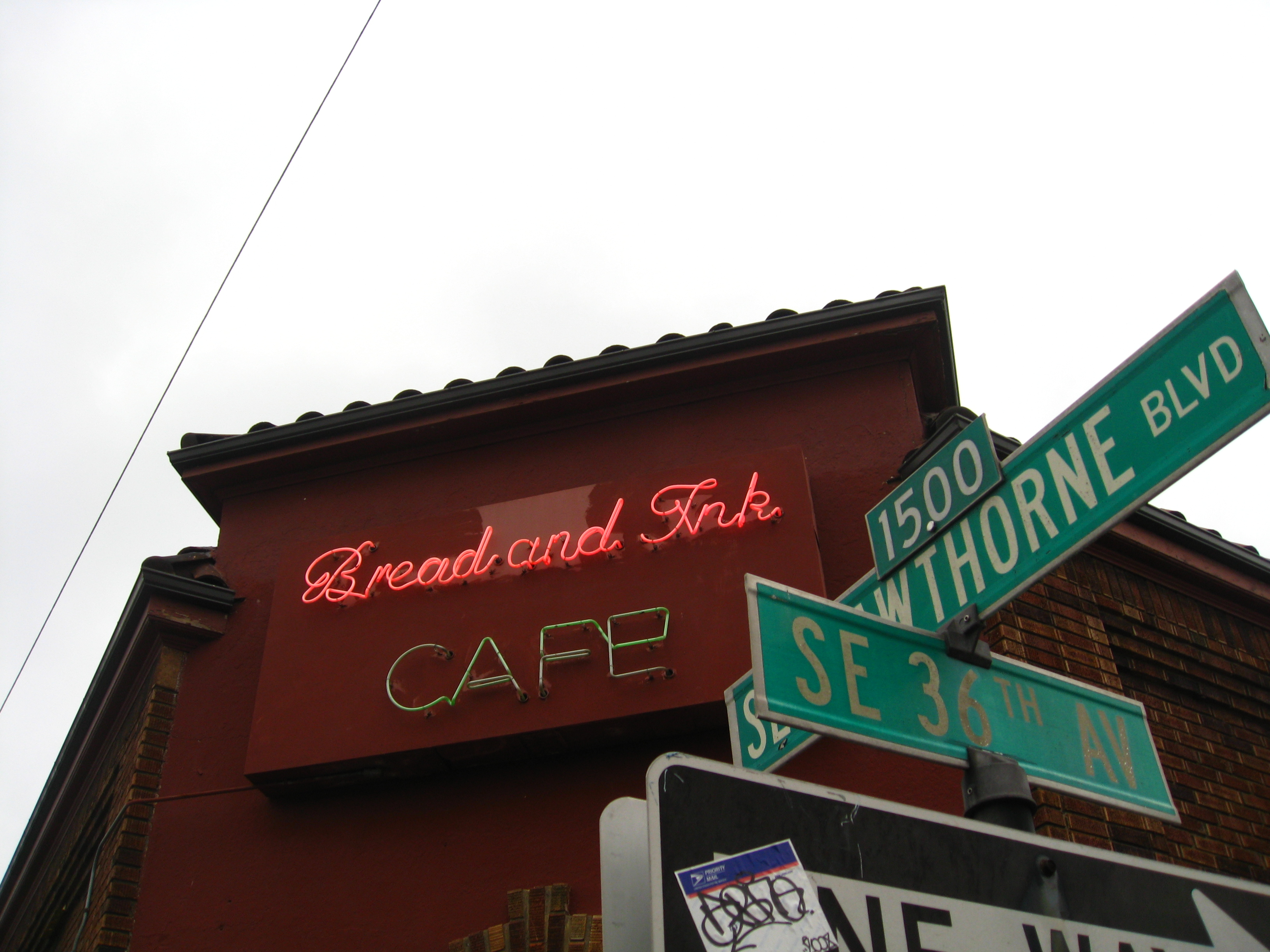
Bread and Ink cafe at 36th and Hawthorne in Portland, Oregon

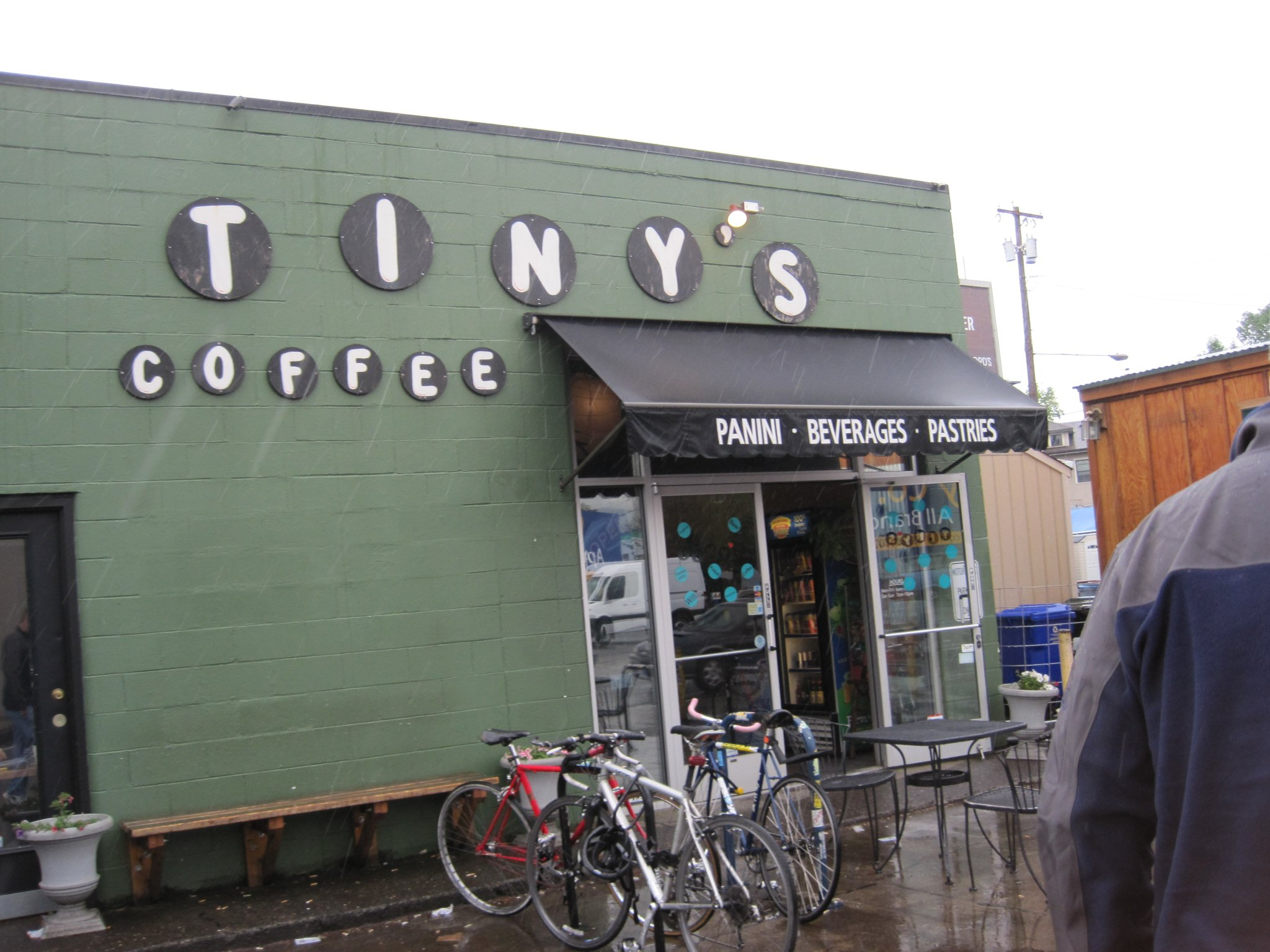
Tiny's Coffee at 12th and Hawthorne in Portland, Oregon

Some Hawthorne establishments

The Hawthorne District in Portland, Oregon, is an area of Southeast Portland on SE Hawthorne Blvd. that runs from 12th to 60th Avenues, with the primary core of businesses between 30th and 50th Avenues. The area has numerous retail stores, including clothing shops, restaurants, bars, brewpubs, and microbreweries.

== History ==
Hawthorne Boulevard was named after J.C. Hawthorne, the cofounder of Oregon's first mental hospital. Originally named "U" Street, the road was renamed Asylum Avenue in 1862. The current Oregon State Hospital was built in Salem in 1883 to take the place of the privately operated Oregon Hospital for the Insane. East Portland residents considered the continued use of the street name Asylum Avenue after the closure of the hospital "distasteful." The name was abandoned in April 1888 when the street was renamed Hawthorne Avenue by city ordinance in honor of Hawthorne. It was renamed again in March 1933 to Hawthorne Boulevard.

Neighbors organized and prevented a McDonald's restaurant from being built at the site of a former Arby's restaurant. The vacant building was replaced with condominiums and retail shops on the first floor.

== Area business association ==
The Hawthorne Boulevard Business Association serves local businesses on the boulevard from SE 12th Ave. through SE 60th Ave. While many Business Districts are intrinsically involved with their Neighborhood associations, this stretch of SE Hawthorne Blvd. is tangent to or a boundary of four neighborhoods: Buckman, Hosford-Abernethy, Sunnyside, Richmond, and passes into a fifth, Mount Tabor.

== Landmarks and recreation ==
- Mt. Tabor Park has exceptional views of Portland, and is built on an extinct volcano.
- The Bagdad Theater and Pub
- Powell's City of Books, Hawthorne Branch
- Western Seminary

== Culture ==
A website that describes itself as "[L]ong-time Portland locals on a mission: to promote our Portland neighborhoods and the independent businesses and artists that thrive in them" said that Hawthorne is popular with different social groups, such as Generation X, hippies, and more recently, hipsters. The Hawthorne area has vintage homes, apartments, and locally owned shops and restaurants.

== See also ==
- Hawthorne Bridge
- Oregon Hospital for the Insane
