= Bagdad Theatre =

Historic theatre in Portland, Oregon, U.S.

- U.S. National Register of Historic Places
- Portland Historic Landmark
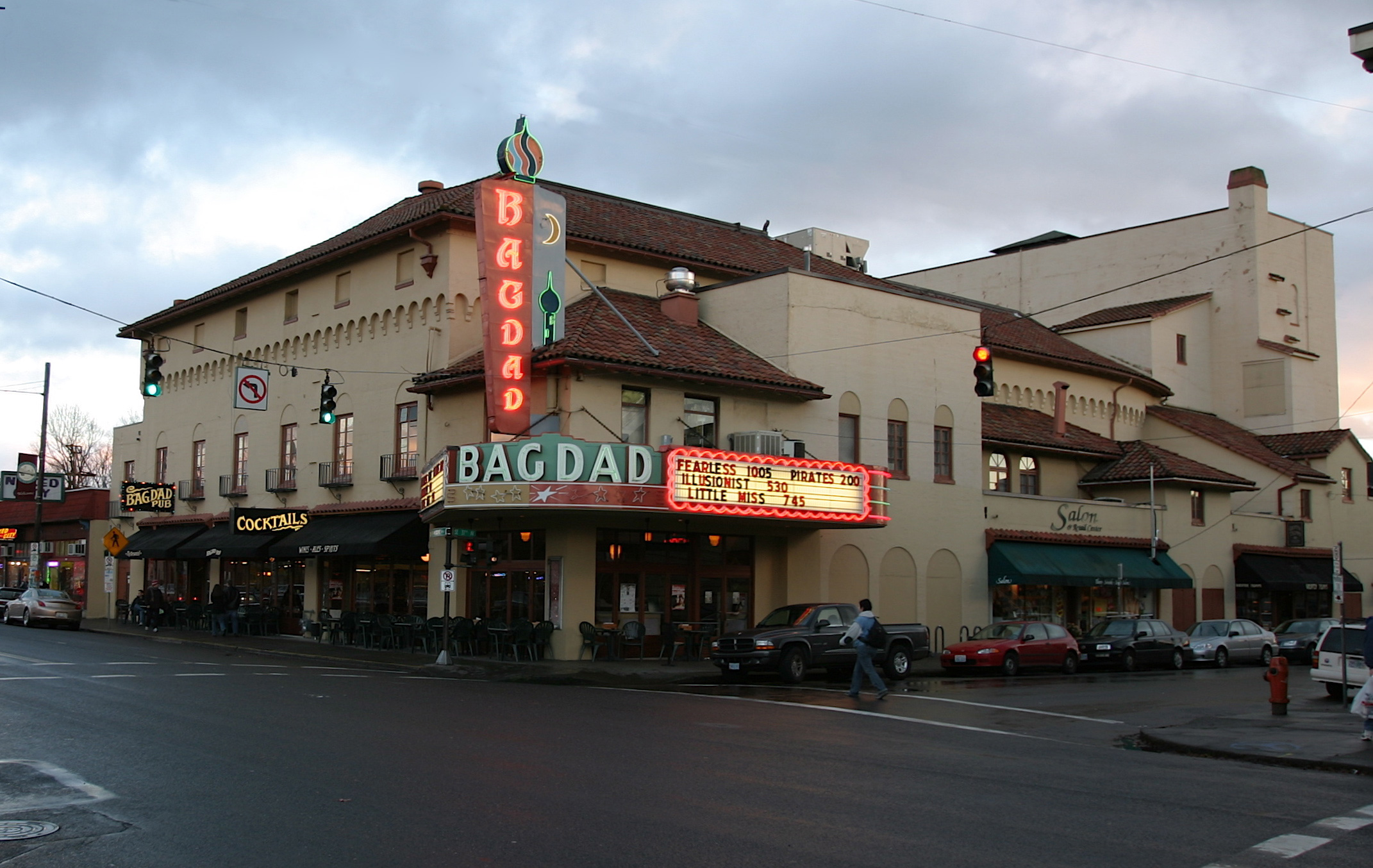
- View from across Hawthorne Boulevard

- Location within Portland, Oregon Location within Oregon Location within the United States
- Location: 3708–26 SE Hawthorne Boulevard; Portland, Oregon
- Coordinates: 45°30′42″N 122°37′32″W
- Built: 1927
- Architect: Thomas & Mercier
- Architectural style: Mission Revival/Spanish Colonial Revival
- NRHP reference No.: 89000099
- Added to NRHP: March 8, 1989

The Bagdad Theatre is a movie theater in the Hawthorne District of Portland, Oregon, United States. It originally opened in 1927 and was the site of the gala premiere of One Flew Over the Cuckoo's Nest in 1975, and of My Own Private Idaho in 1991.

The theatre was listed on the National Register of Historic Places in 1989. It is currently owned by the McMenamins brewpub chain.

== Description ==
The rectangular structure covers almost all of four adjacent lots that total less than 1 acre (0.40 ha). Resting on a concrete foundation, the Bagdad is made largely of reinforced concrete covered with stucco. Building heights vary from three-and-a-half stories on the north to three in the middle to five on the south. Partial basements underlie the north and south ends, and the structure is topped by a variety of shed, hip, and flat roofs of red tile.

Commercial storefronts, separated by a glassed-in theater entrance, face north and west on the main floor. Other exterior features include multi-paned transoms, fanlight transoms, red tile hoods above windows, decorative molding, mock rafters, and wrought-iron balconets. With a few exceptions, the exterior looks much as it did in 1927.

A 700-foot (210 m) lobby leads from the entrance toward the theater's viewing areas. Hallways, ramps, and the auditorium have concrete walls decorated in a style meant to suggest the interior of a building near the Mediterranean Sea. Features include trompe-l'œil tiles, ornate lighting fixtures, arched doorways, and motifs involving animals and legendary creatures.

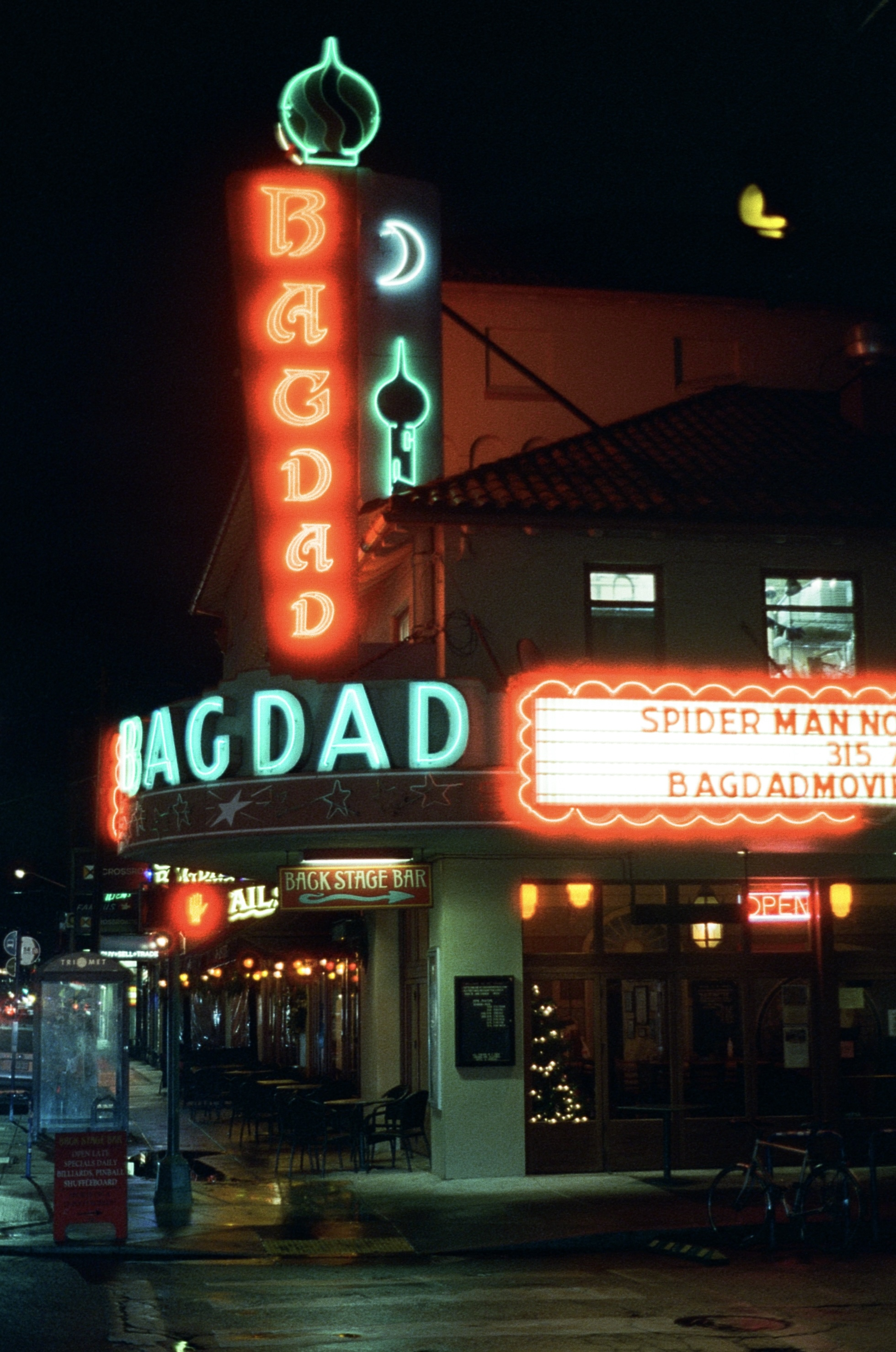
Bagdad Theatre in December 2021

== History ==
Universal Studios spent $100,000 on the construction of the Bagdad. Thomas and Mercier, a Portland architectural firm, designed the Bagdad, which was built by Christman and Otis Development Company. The theater's exotic exterior and its huge neon-lit marquee competed with other movie houses, drive-in restaurants, and billboards of the 1920s in attracting customers' attention. Moorish, Egyptian, and Mayan motifs appeared here and there on movie houses across the city. The theater opened on January 14, 1927, with a showing of Her Big Night (1926) starring Laura La Plante.

The theater's interior included a large stage, a fountain, and Middle-Eastern decor, and its female ushers wore uniforms meant to appear Arabian. Early shows featured silent films, talkies, a theater orchestra, live stage shows, and vaudeville. Noted performers in the past included Sammy Davis Jr., and the Will Mastin Trio.

In 1975, Jack Nicholson, Louise Fletcher, and Michael Douglas appeared at the Bagdad for Oregon's first showing of One Flew Over the Cuckoo's Nest. My Own Private Idaho opened at the Bagdad in 1991 after McMenamins renovated the theater.

In later years, the theater has hosted regular film series, like the "Midnight Movie" series organized by the hosts of cortandfatboy, in addition to book tours hosted by Powell's Books. In 2013, McMenamins renovated the theater, which included a larger screen, a digital projector, new seats, and an upgraded sound system.

== See also ==
- Back Stage Bar
- National Register of Historic Places listings in Southeast Portland, Oregon
