= Richmond, Portland, Oregon =

Richmond
- Neighborhood
- Location in Portland
- Coordinates: 45°30′17″N 122°37′22″W
- Country: United States
- State: Oregon
- City: Portland
- Named for: Richmond Kelly

Area
  - Total: 1.27 sq mi (3.3 km^{2})

Population (2000)
  - Total: 11,320
  - Density: 8,910/sq mi (3,440/km^{2})

Housing
  - No. of households: 4,972
  - Occupancy rate: 96% occupied
  - Owner-occupied: 2,990 households (60%)
  - Renting: 1,982 households (40%)
  - Avg. household size: 2.28 persons

Richmond is a neighborhood in the Southeast section of Portland, Oregon. It borders Sunnyside on the north, Mt. Tabor and South Tabor on the east, Creston-Kenilworth on the south, and Hosford-Abernethy on the west.

The northern edge of the neighborhood is part of the Hawthorne District.

Neighborhood parks include Sewallcrest Park (1940), Ivon Community Garden (1978), and Ivon Street Park (1989).

Richmond is named after Richmond Kelly, son of an early immigrant from Kentucky who held one of the donation land claims in the area, Rev. Clinton Kelly.

The Richmond neighborhood is home to Richmond Elementary School, the first of three which comprise the Japanese Magnet Program of Portland Public Schools. JMP students continue on to Mt. Tabor Middle School and then to Grant High School in the Grant Park neighborhood.
