= Charlotte Moffett Cartwright =

American pioneer and women's suffrage campaigner (1842–1915)

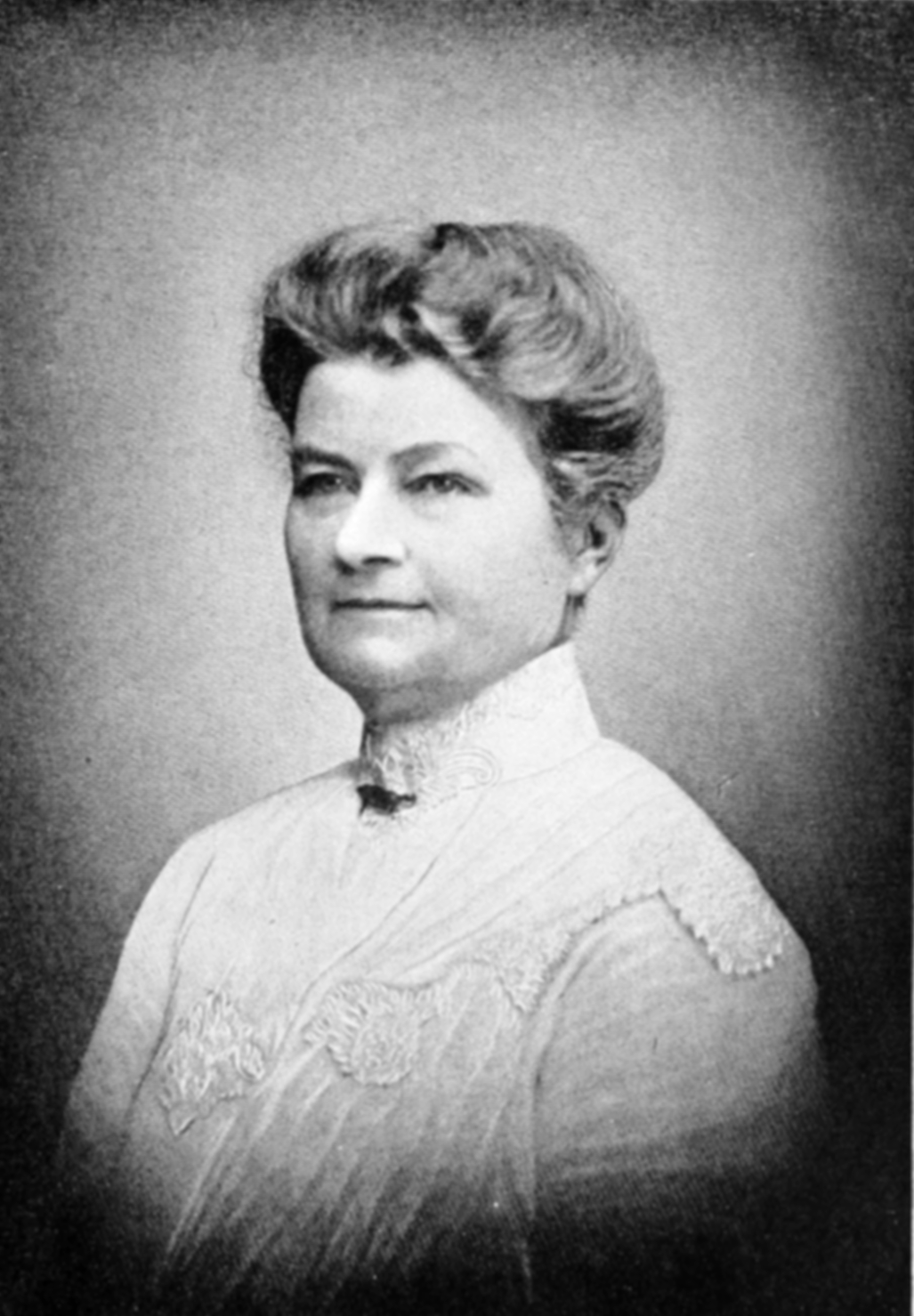
- Born: Charlotte Ann Terwilliger; December 21, 1842; Chicago, Illinois, U.S.
- Died: July 20, 1915 (aged 72); Gearhart, Oregon
- Burial place: Lone Fir Cemetery, Portland, Oregon
- Occupation(s): Pioneer, women's suffrage activist

Charlotte Moffett Cartwright (December 21, 1842 – July 20, 1915), born Charlotte Ann Terwilliger, was an Oregon pioneer at the age of three, in the year 1845. Her father, James Terwilliger, brought the family to Oregon in that year, as part of the ill-fated Meek Cutoff party. Her mother died shortly after reaching The Dalles. She was brought up in the first European-built house in Portland, built by her father.

She was known for her role in the women's suffrage movement, with the Oregon Pioneer Association, and as "Mother Moffett", a caretaker of orphans. She also arranged and funded a circulating library in Oregon.

== Personal ==
She was married twice, first to Walter Moffatt, who died at sea, and then C.M. Cartwright. She had five children with her first husband.

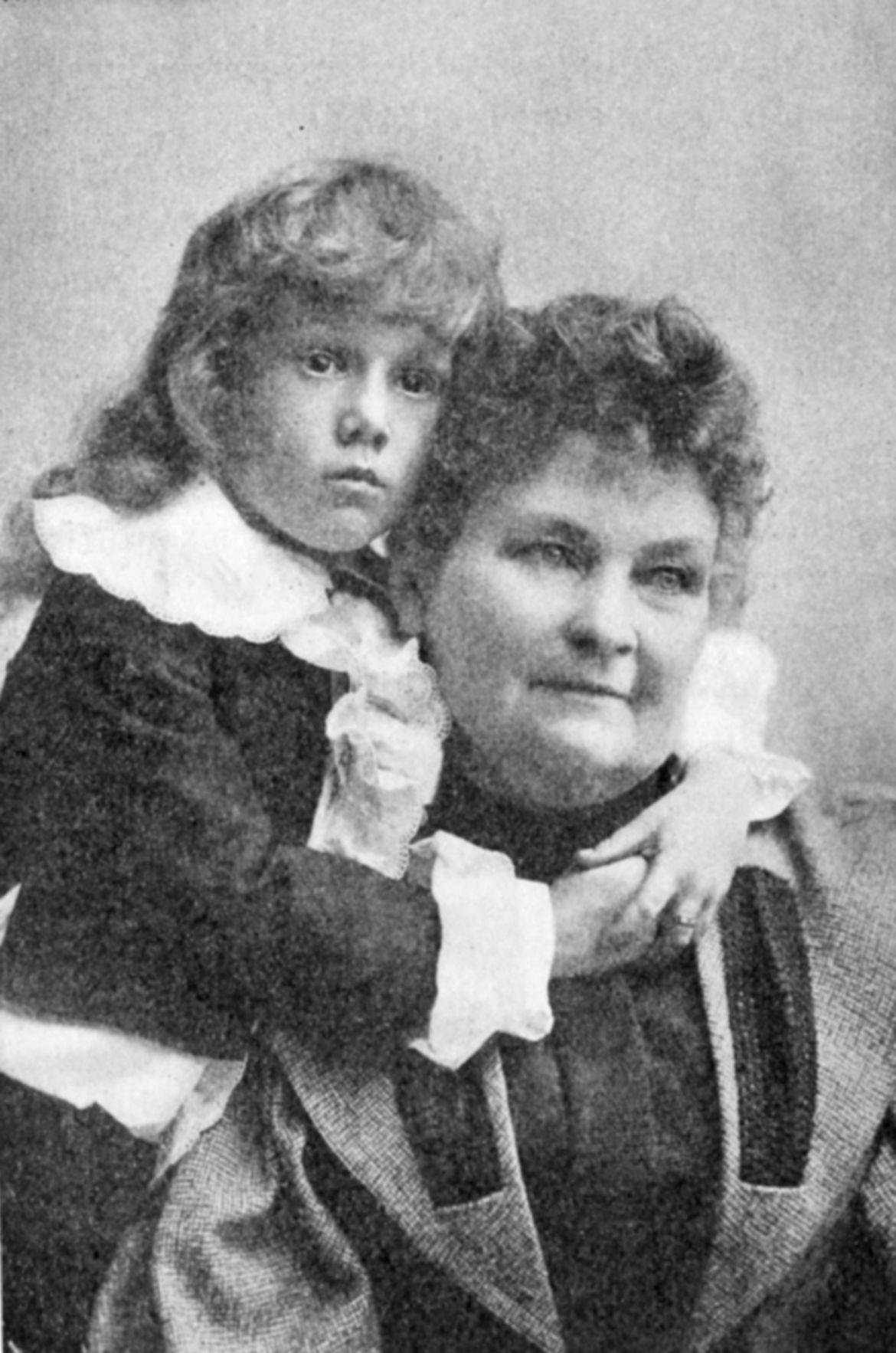
Charlotte Moffett Cartwright with her grandson, circa 1905.
