= Duniway =

Duniway is a surname. Notable people with the name include:

- Abigail Scott Duniway (1834–1915), American women's rights advocate, newspaper editor and writer
- Ben C. Duniway (1907–1986), United States circuit judge of the United States Court of Appeals
- Clyde A. Duniway (1866–1944), American educator, president of the University of Montana (1908–1912)

== See also ==
- Duniway Hotel, Hilton-brand hotel in Portland, Oregon
- Duniway Park, public park in southwest Portland, Oregon
