= Tryon Creek =

Tributary of the Willamette River in Oregon

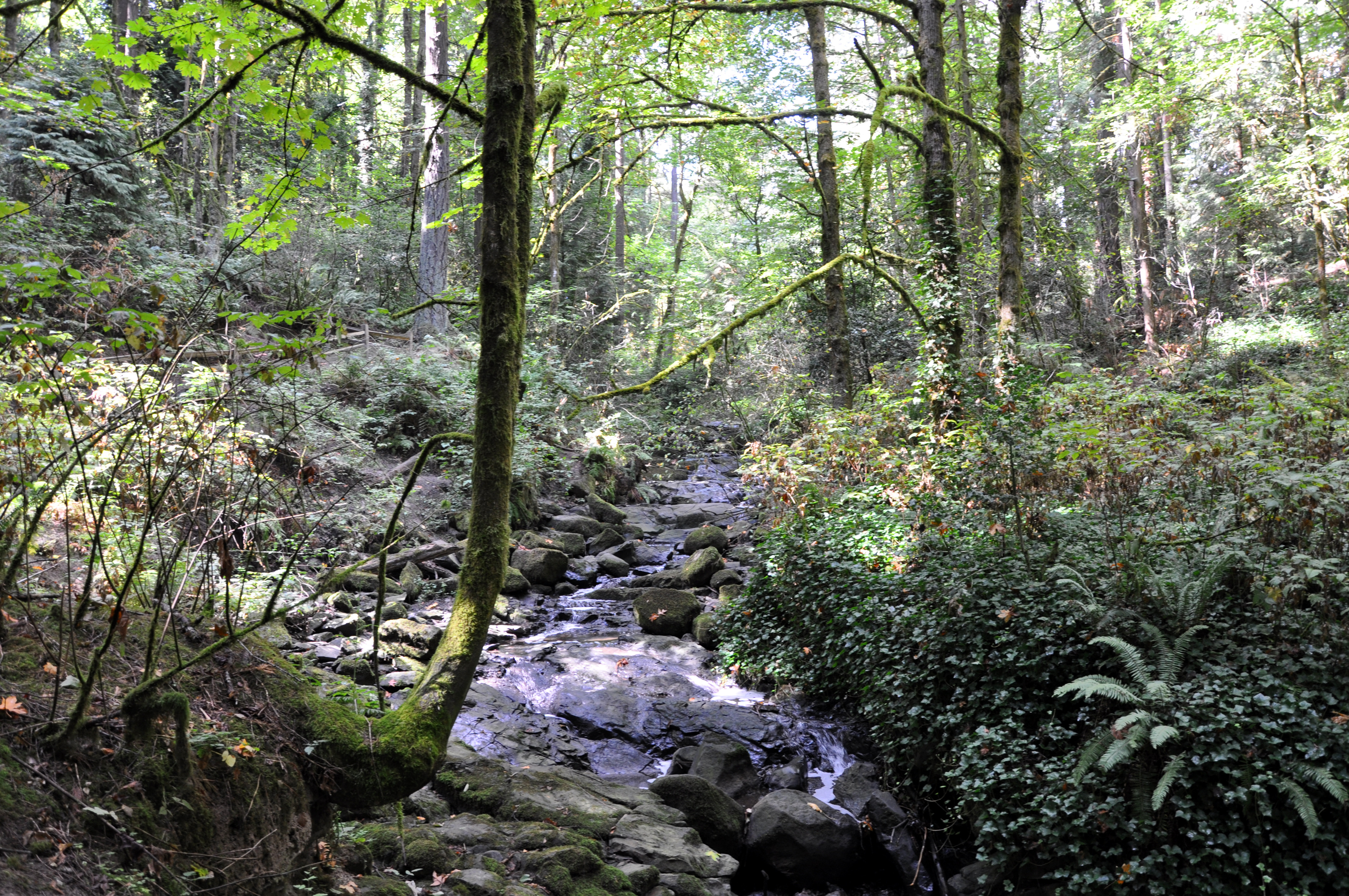
- Upper Tryon Creek in Marshall Park

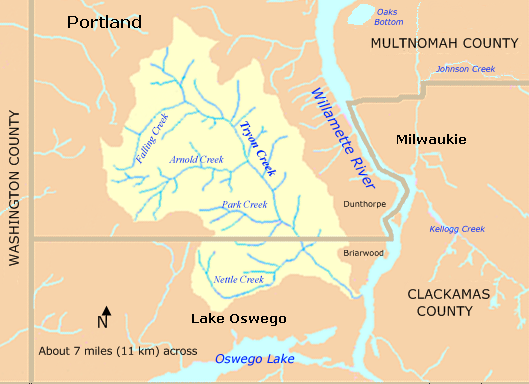
- Tryon Creek watershed

- Location of the mouth of Tryon Creek in Oregon
- Etymology: Socrates Hotchkiss Tryon, Sr., who settled nearby in 1850

Location
- Country: United States
- State: Oregon
- County: Multnomah and Clackamas

Physical characteristics
- Source: Tualatin Mountains (West Hills)
  - location: Portland, Multnomah County, Oregon
  - coordinates: 45°26′49″N 122°43′18″W
  - elevation: 641 ft (195 m)
- Mouth: Willamette River
  - location: Lake Oswego, Clackamas County, Oregon
  - coordinates: 45°25′22″N 122°39′24″W
  - elevation: 10 ft (3.0 m)
- Length: 4.85 mi (7.81 km)
- Basin size: 6.5 sq mi (17 km^{2})
- Discharge
  - location: below the confluence with Nettle Creek, 1 mile (1.6 km) from the Tryon Creek mouth
  - average: 8.72 cu ft/s (0.247 m^{3}/s)
  - minimum: 0.09 cu ft/s (0.0025 m^{3}/s)
  - maximum: 1,210 cu ft/s (34 m^{3}/s)

Tryon Creek is a 4.85-mile (7.81 km) tributary of the Willamette River in the U.S. state of Oregon. Part of the drainage basin of the Columbia River, its watershed covers about 6.5 square miles (16.8 km^{2}) in Multnomah and Clackamas counties. The stream flows southeast from the Tualatin Mountains (West Hills) through the Multnomah Village neighborhood of Portland and the Tryon Creek State Natural Area to the Willamette in the city of Lake Oswego. Parks and open spaces cover about 21 percent of the watershed, while single-family homes dominate most of the remainder. The largest of the parks is the state natural area, which straddles the border between the two cities and counties.

The bedrock under the watershed includes part of the last exotic terrane, a chain of seamounts, acquired by the North American Plate as it moved west during the Eocene. Known as the Waverly Hills Formation, it lies buried under ash and lava from later volcanic eruptions, sediments from flooding and erosion, and layers of wind-blown silt. Two dormant volcanoes from the Boring Lava Field are in the Tryon Creek watershed.

Named for mid-19th century settler, Socrates Hotchkiss Tryon, Sr., the creek ran through forests of cedar and fir that were later logged by the Oregon Iron Company and others through the mid-20th century. Efforts to establish a large park in the watershed began in the 1950s and succeeded in 1975 when the state park was formally established. As of 2005, about 37 percent of the watershed was wooded and supported more than 60 species of birds as well as small mammals, amphibians, and fish. At the same time, the human population was about 18,000.

== Course ==
Tryon Creek begins slightly north of Interstate 5 (I-5) and Oregon Route 99W near Multnomah Village and flows southeast for 4.85 miles (7.81 km) through Portland residential neighborhoods as well as Marshall Park and the Tryon Creek State Natural Area to its confluence with the Willamette River in the city of Lake Oswego. Not far from its source, the main stem runs through three closely spaced culverts with a combined length of 260 feet (79 m) then flows on the surface before entering another culvert, 160 feet (49 m) long under Southwest 30th Avenue at river mile (RM) 4.56 or river kilometer (RK) 7.34. Shortly thereafter, the stream passes under Route 99W (Barbur Boulevard) and I-5 through another culvert, 560 feet (170 m) long.

Tryon Creek receives Falling Creek from the right at 4.16 miles (6.69 km) from the mouth. Quail and Burlingame creeks enter from the right shortly thereafter. At Marshall Park, the stream passes through a series of rock pools and steps known as the Marshall Cascade from RM 3.48 (RK 5.60) to RM 3.28 (RK 5.28). At the end of the Marshall Cascade, it receives Owl Creek. Arnold Creek, which is Tryon Creek's largest tributary, enters from the right 2.68 miles (4.31 km) from the mouth. Almost immediately, the creek enters a culvert, about 150 feet (46 m) long, that passes under Southwest Boones Ferry Road.

Shortly thereafter, Tryon Creek enters the Tryon Creek State Natural Area. To the stream's right is the North Creek Trail. Soon the creek receives Fourth Avenue Creek from the left. At this point, the Fourth Avenue Trail runs parallel to the creek along the left bank. This trail soon merges with the Lewis and Clark Trail, which also runs parallel to the creek along the left bank. Then Tryon Creek passes under the High Bridge, the uppermost of five footbridges that span the main stem within the park. High Bridge carries the Middle Creek Trail as well as a linear horse trail connecting the park's North and South horse loops. Below this bridge, the creek flows for about 0.20 miles (0.32 km) before passing under the Beaver Bridge. In this stretch, the Middle Creek Trail parallels the stream along the right bank but crosses to the left bank at the bridge. Shortly thereafter, the creek passes under Obie's Bridge, which carries the Old Man Trail.

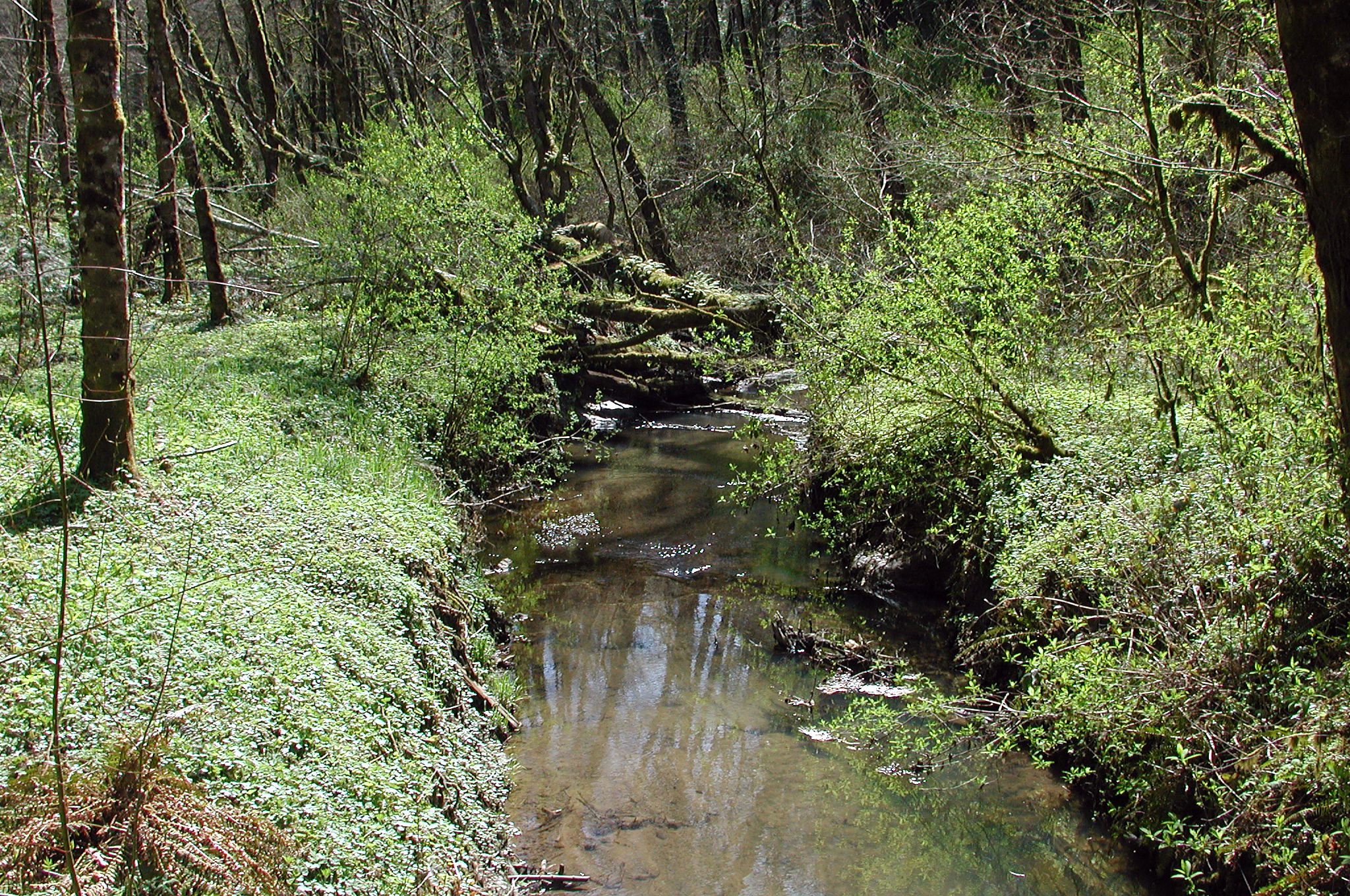
Tryon Creek at Obie's Bridge

Park Creek enters from the right at RM 1.80 (RK 2.90). Slightly below the confluence, the creek passes under the Red Fox Bridge, which carries the Red Fox Trail. Thereafter, the creek runs roughly parallel to the South Creek Trail, which is on the right for about 0.40 miles (0.64 km). The creek receives Red Fox Creek from the right and Palatine Hill Creek from the left, then flows out of Portland and Multnomah County and into the city of Lake Oswego and Clackamas County. The stream then passes under the Iron Mountain Bridge, which carries the Iron Mountain Trail. Just below the bridge, Nettle Creek enters from the right at 1.06 miles (1.71 km) from the mouth, and shortly thereafter the creek passes a United States Geological Survey (USGS) stream gauge, which is on the right. The creek leaves the Tryon Creek State Natural Area just before entering a 200-foot (61 m) culvert under Oregon Route 43 at RM 0.24 (RK 0.39) and soon thereafter a set of Union Pacific Railroad tracks. Below this, Tryon Creek forms the boundary between the city of Lake Oswego and Briarwood, an unincorporated Clackamas County community, which is to the left. The Tryon Creek Wastewater Treatment Plant is on the right during this last stretch before the creek enters the Willamette River about 20 miles (32 km) upstream from its confluence with the Columbia River.

=== Discharge ===
Since 2002, the USGS has monitored the flow of Tryon Creek at a station 1 mile (1.6 km) from the mouth. The average flow between 2002 and 2011 was 8.72 cubic feet per second (0.25 m^{3}/s). This is from a drainage area of 6.28 square miles (16.27 km^{2}), about 97 percent of the total Tryon Creek watershed. The maximum flow recorded during this period was 1,210 cubic feet per second (34 m^{3}/s) on December 9, 2010. The minimum was 0.09 cubic feet per second (0.0025 m^{3}/s) on September 4, 5, and 12, 2002.

== Geology ==
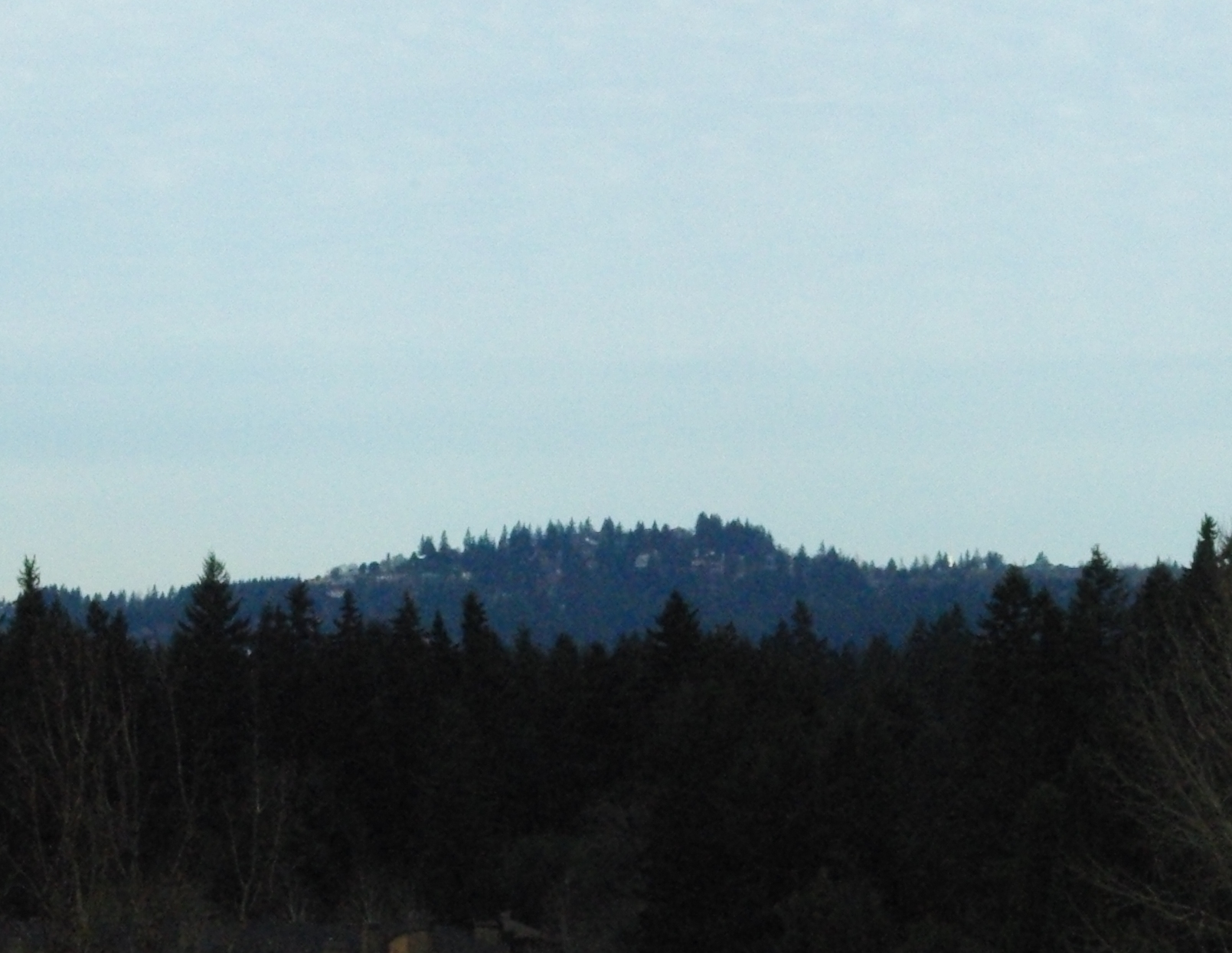
Mount Sylvania as seen from Tualatin, southwest of the Tryon Creek watershed

One hundred and fifty million years ago, Oregon did not exist. Not until plate tectonics separated North America from Europe and North Africa and pushed it westward did the continent acquire, bit by bit, what became the Pacific Northwest. Over many millions of years, the continent collided with and incorporated islands, reefs, and other exotic terranes. Part of the last major exotic terrane acquired by the North American Plate during the Eocene lies under the Tryon Creek watershed. The terrane consisted of a chain of seamounts that by 34 million years ago was being uplifted to become the Oregon Coast Range and the Tualatin Mountains (West Hills). The easternmost exposure of the basalts of this terrane is in Waverly Heights, near Milwaukie, across the Willamette River from Tryon Creek, and this formation underlies most of Tryon Creek State Park.

Between 15 and 16 million years ago, in the Middle Miocene, eruptions of Columbia River basalts from volcanic vents in eastern Oregon and Washington flowed across much of northern Oregon, sometimes reaching the Pacific Ocean. Although these basalts have been mapped in the West Hills under Marquam Hill, Hoyt Arboretum, and the steepest slopes of Forest Park, they flowed around but did not completely cover the Waverly Hills Formation in the Tryon Creek watershed.

Starting about 3 million years ago and continuing at least through the late Pleistocene, extensional faulting of the Earth's crust led to eruption of small volcanoes in the Boring volcanic field. This field extended roughly from Portland and Tualatin on the west to Battle Ground, Washington, on the north to Sandy and Boring on the east. Two of these volcanoes, Mount Sylvania and Cook's Butte, are in the Tryon Creek watershed. The Mount Sylvania eruptions included ash plumes and lava flows that covered some of the Waverly Heights Formation and Columbia River basalts.

About 15,000 years ago, cataclysmic ice age events known as the Missoula Floods or Bretz Floods originating in the Clark Fork region of northern Idaho inundated the Columbia River basin many times. These floods deposited huge amounts of debris and sediment and created new floodplains in the Willamette Valley. Over long stretches of time between the great floods, dry winds deposited silt. At elevations above 300 feet (90 m) in the Tryon Creek watershed, wind-blown silt covers the lava, while at lower elevations sand and gravel cover the bedrock.

== Watershed ==
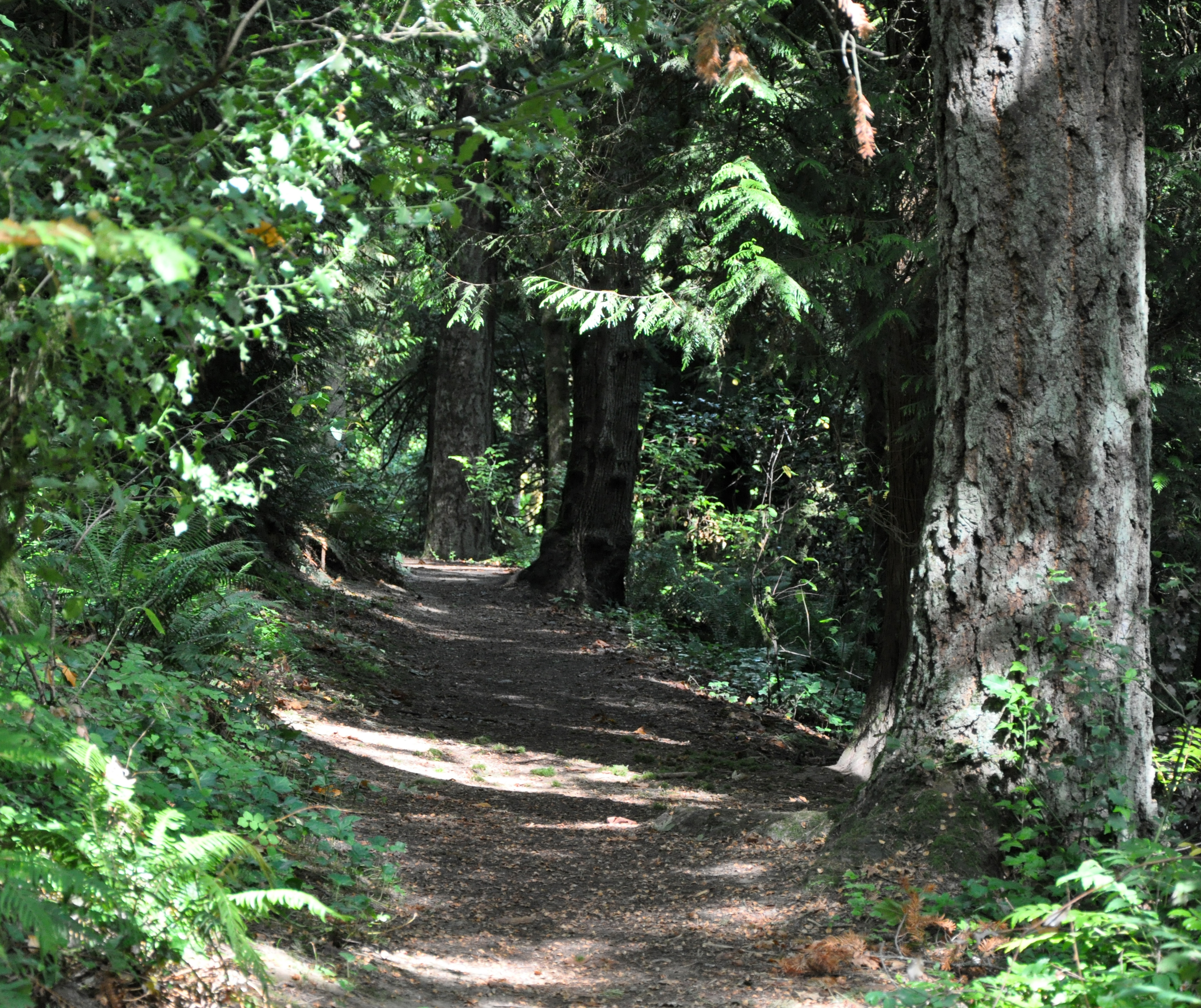
A path runs through the forest near Tryon Creek in Marshall Park.

The Tryon Creek watershed covers about 4,100 acres (1,700 ha) or 6.5 square miles (17 km^{2}). Of this, about 80 percent is within the Portland city limits, and the remaining 20 percent is split among the jurisdictions of the city of Lake Oswego, and the counties of Multnomah and Clackamas. These four overlap with the jurisdiction of the State of Oregon, which owns the natural area. Watersheds that border the Tryon Creek watershed are Fanno Creek to the west and northwest, Stephens Creek to the north, the Willamette River to the east and Oswego Lake to the south. More than 70 miles (110 km) of surface streets, including parts of Interstate 5, Oregon Route 99W, Oregon Route 43, Boones Ferry Road, Taylors Ferry Road, and Terwilliger Boulevard, run through the watershed.

About 35 inches (890 mm) of precipitation, almost entirely rain, fall on the watershed each year. Summers are dry, and most of the precipitation occurs between October and May. Elevations within the drainage basin vary from Mount Sylvania, which rises to 970 feet (300 m) above sea level in the West Hills, to 10 feet (3.0 m) where the creek enters the Willamette River. Between 60 and 75 percent of the slopes in the watershed exceed a 30-percent grade and are especially steep near the headwaters. Impervious surfaces cover about 24 percent of the basin. These surfaces and the relatively impermeable silt and clay soils that underlie the area contribute to rapid runoff and low baseflows in the creek and its tributaries. The total length of surface streams in the drainage basin is about 27 miles (43 km), while another 3 miles (5 km) run through culverts or pipes. Although major flooding in 1996 caused landslides and severe damage to stream beds and banks along Tryon Creek and its tributaries, it caused no significant property damage in the watershed.

In 2000, the population of the Tryon Creek watershed within Portland was about 18,000. In 2005, Portland's Bureau of Environmental Services (BES) described land-use zoning in the watershed as follows: single-family residential, 55 percent; parks and open space, 14 percent; multi-family residential, 5 percent; commercial, 3 percent, and insufficient data, 2 percent. To reach 100 percent, BES listed but did not differentiate by zoning type the roughly 20 percent of the watershed that lies beyond the Portland city limits. Metro, the regional government for the Portland metropolitan area, says that parks and natural areas cover about 21 percent of the total watershed, while single-family housing dominates most of the rest.

=== Tributaries ===
The major smaller streams in the Tryon Creek watershed are Arnold Creek and Falling Creek. The larger of the two, Arnold Creek, has a watershed of roughly 1.2 square miles (3.1 km^{2}) or 18 percent of the 6.5-square-mile (17 km^{2}) total, while Falling Creek's watershed covers 0.4 square miles (1.0 km^{2}) or 6 percent of the total. The seven named tributaries from mouth to source are Nettle, Palatine Hill, Red Fox, Park, Fourth Avenue, Arnold, and Falling creeks.

=== Water quality ===
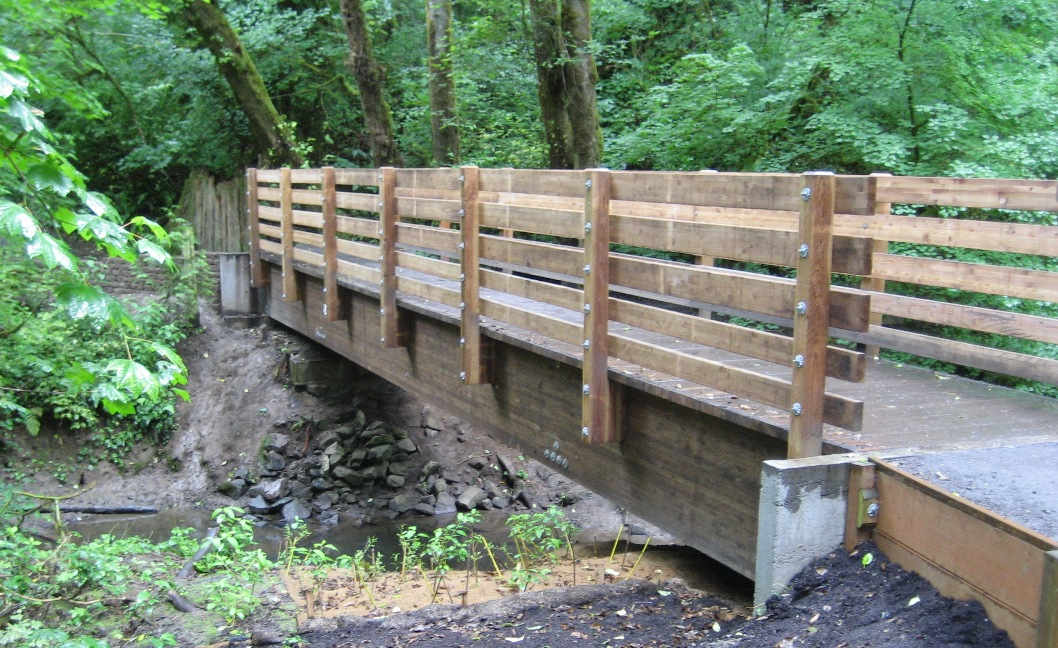
High Bridge over Tryon Creek in Tryon Creek State Natural Area

Oregon Department of Environmental Quality (DEQ) developed the Oregon Water Quality Index (OWQI) in the 1970s to rate general water quality at different locations. Scores can vary from 10 (worst) to 100 (ideal). Portland's Bureau of Environmental Services (BES) incorporated the OWQI into its monitoring of Tryon Creek in 1997. As of 2004, the overall OWQI score for Tryon Creek was 74 or "poor"; this was slightly better than nearby Fanno Creek at 67. The State of Oregon listed Tryon Creek as "water-quality limited" in 1998 because water temperatures on the lower 5 miles (8 km) of the main stem as well as on Nettle, Arnold, and Falling creeks exceeded the upper limit for protecting salmonid fish rearing and migratory fish passage during the summer.

BES monitors water quality at three Tryon Creek sites. Two are near I-5 and Barbur Boulevard in the upper watershed, and the third is at Southwest Boones Ferry Road, about 2.7 miles (4.3 km) from the mouth. BES looks at several indicators such as dissolved oxygen, nutrients, and total suspended solids. Diffuse pollution from nonpoint sources enters the creek from its urban surroundings. Point sources of pollution in the creek include two major upper-watershed stormwater outfalls draining 368 acres (149 ha) of the upper watershed and contributing about half of the creek's total suspended solids. As of 2004, the only water-quality indicator in the watershed that failed to meet minimal standards was the water temperature.

=== Annual report card ===
In 2015, BES began issuing annual "report cards" for watersheds or fractions thereof that lie within the city. BES assigns grades for each of four categories: hydrology, water quality, habitat, and fish and wildlife. Hydrology grades depend on the amount of pavement and other impervious surfaces in the watershed and the degree to which its streams flow freely, not dammed or diverted. Water-quality grades are based on measurements of dissolved oxygen, E-coli bacteria, temperature, suspended solids, and substances such as mercury and phosphorus. Habitat ranking depends on the condition of stream banks and floodplains, riparian zones, tree canopies, and other variables. The fish and wildlife assessment includes birds, fish, and macroinvertebrates. In 2015, the BES grades for Tryon Creek are hydrology, B; water quality, B; habitat, B, and fish and wildlife, C−.

== History ==
The Tryon house, built in 1850 and demolished in the 1990s

Multnomah and Clackamas counties were named after groups of Native Americans who lived in the area before settlement by European Americans in the 19th century. Evidence suggests that people lived in the northern Oregon Cascades as early as 10,000 years ago. By 2,000 to 3,000 years ago, the Clackamas River basin, about 5 miles (8 km) upriver from the mouth of Tryon Creek and on the east side of the Willamette, was home to the Clackamas tribe. They were a subgroup of the Chinookan speakers who lived near the Columbia River from Celilo Falls to the Pacific Ocean. The Clackamas lands included the lower Willamette River from Willamette Falls at what became Oregon City to its confluence with the Columbia River. When Lewis and Clark visited the area in 1806, the Clackamas tribe consisted of about 1,800 people living in 11 villages. Epidemics of smallpox, malaria, and measles reduced this population to 88 by 1851, and in 1855 the tribe signed a treaty surrendering its lands. Another group of Chinookans, the Multnomahs, lived on Sauvie Island, about 17 miles (27 km) downriver from the mouth of Tryon Creek. Lewis and Clark estimated that 800 Multnomahs inhabited 5 villages on the island in 1806, but disease reduced them later in the century to near extinction.

In 1850, Socrates Hotchkiss Tryon, Sr., a pioneer settler of European descent, established a donation land claim at the south end of Tryon Creek canyon. Five years later, he died, leaving the land to his wife, Frances. The land then passed to other relatives, including Socrates Tryon, Jr., who sold the 645 acres (261 ha) in 1874 to the Oregon Iron Company. For nearly 25 years, the company cut virgin cedar and fir to use in its foundry in Lake Oswego. Its logging road later became Old Iron Mountain Trail in the Tryon Creek State Natural Area. In 1900, fire in the upper canyon left charred snags still visible along the natural area's Center and Big Fir trails.

Logging resumed in 1912 in the north part of the canyon, where The Boone's Ferry Wood and Tie Company had a site near what became Alfred Street. A sawmill and steam donkey engine operated near the future sites of Beaver Bridge and Obie's Bridge. The lumber was used chiefly for railroad ties, cordwood and flagpoles, and left huge cedar stumps that remain in the park. Intermittent logging continued through 1961, and a 1962 windstorm known as the Columbus Day Storm blew down many remaining trees.

Local efforts began in the 1950s to establish a park along the creek, In 1969, the government of Multnomah County bought 45 acres (18 ha) to start a large regional park and sought citizen assistance with the project. This led to formation of Friends of Tryon Creek Park, which raised funds, helped arrange land deals, worked on problems of jurisdiction in a two-county, two-city park, and sought help from the state. In 1970, Oregon Governor Tom McCall announced the formation of Tryon Creek State Park.

Over the next few years, the state bought more than 600 acres (240 ha) of land for nearly $3 million, including federal matching funds. The Friends and the state collaborated in park planning and further fund-raising. In 1973, more than 300 volunteers built trails, and the nature center and shelter were finished by 1975. The park was officially dedicated on July 1, 1975 and later renamed Tryon Creek State Natural Area.

== Vegetation and wildlife ==
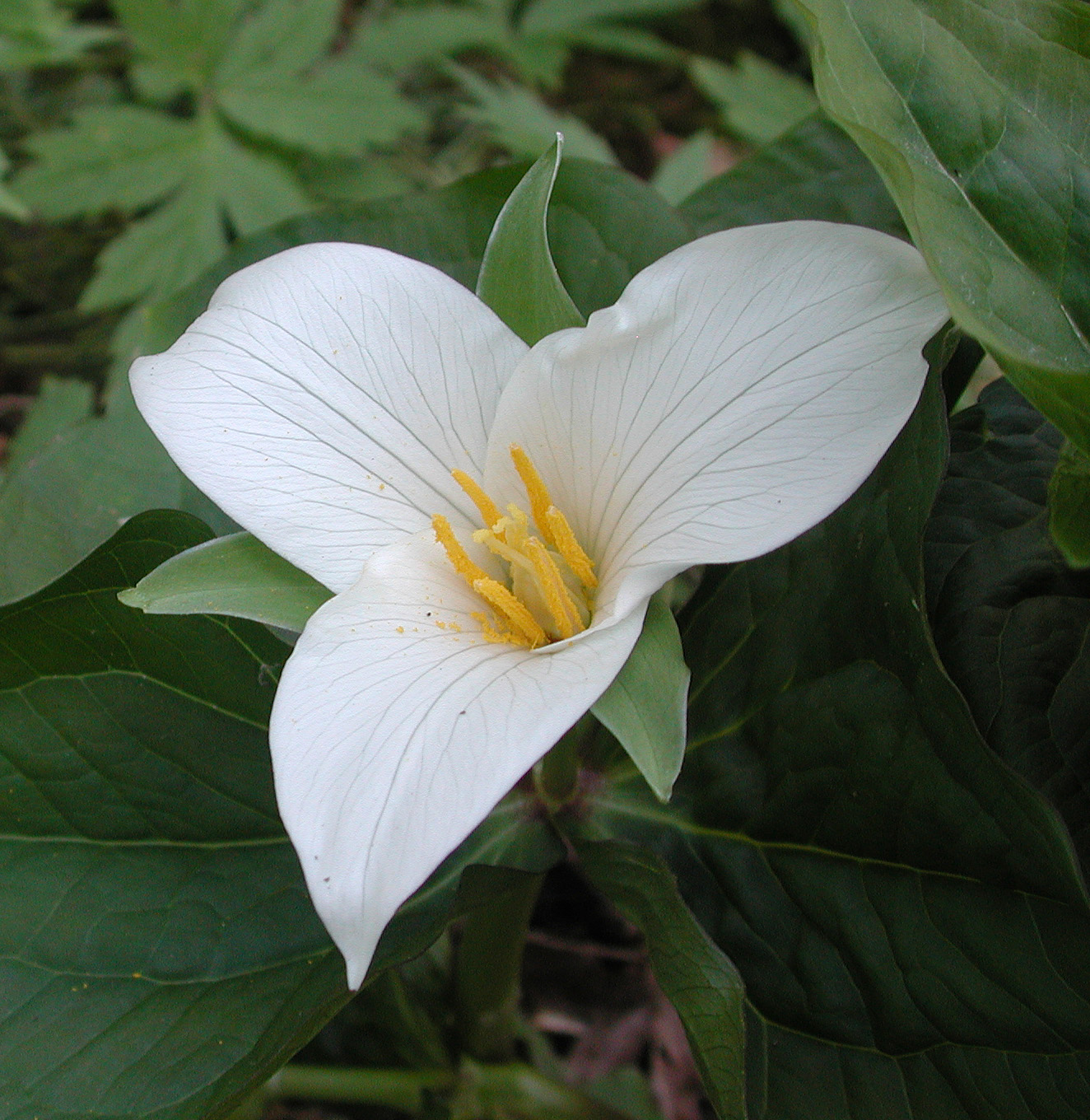
Western trilliums flourish in the Tryon Creek State Natural Area.

About 37 percent of the watershed is wooded. Dominant trees are red alder, bigleaf maple, Douglas-fir, western redcedar, and western hemlock. The forest understory in the Tryon Creek State Natural Area includes many trilliums; they are celebrated each spring during the park's Trillium Festival. More than 90 species of wildflower such as fringecup are found in the park as well as plants such as sword fern. Invasive species found in many parts of the watershed include English ivy, Himalayan blackberry, English holly, garlic mustard, and western clematis.

Riparian zones and floodplains are relatively intact along the lower reaches of the main stem in the state natural area, fairly intact in Marshall Park, and marginal in the upper reaches surrounded by homes. Arnold Creek has riparian corridors wider than 100 feet (30 m) in good condition, while Falling Creek's riparian zones, surrounded by homes, are in poor condition. Damaged zones from which native vegetation has been removed lead to erosion, stream bank failure, sedimentation, lack of shading, and higher stream temperatures.

Tryon Creek is among the few streams in the Portland metropolitan area with a run of steelhead Trout, and coho salmon have been recorded spawning in the creek. Surveys by the Oregon Department of Fish and Wildlife in 2002 found coho, chinook salmon, steelhead, and coastal cutthroat trout in different parts of the creek at different times of the year. None was present in large number. Cutthroat trout had the biggest population, estimated at 53 individual fish during the spring of 2002. Signal crayfish have also been found in significant numbers. Water striders, which are invertebrates that can walk on water, are common in the pools of Tryon Creek. More than 60 species of birds, including Cooper's hawks, great blue herons, kingfishers, towhees, waxwings, and wrens frequent the area. Some of the resident mammals are bats, coyotes, moles, rabbits, skunks, and squirrels, while frogs, salamanders, snakes, and turtles also do well in the watershed.

== Parks ==
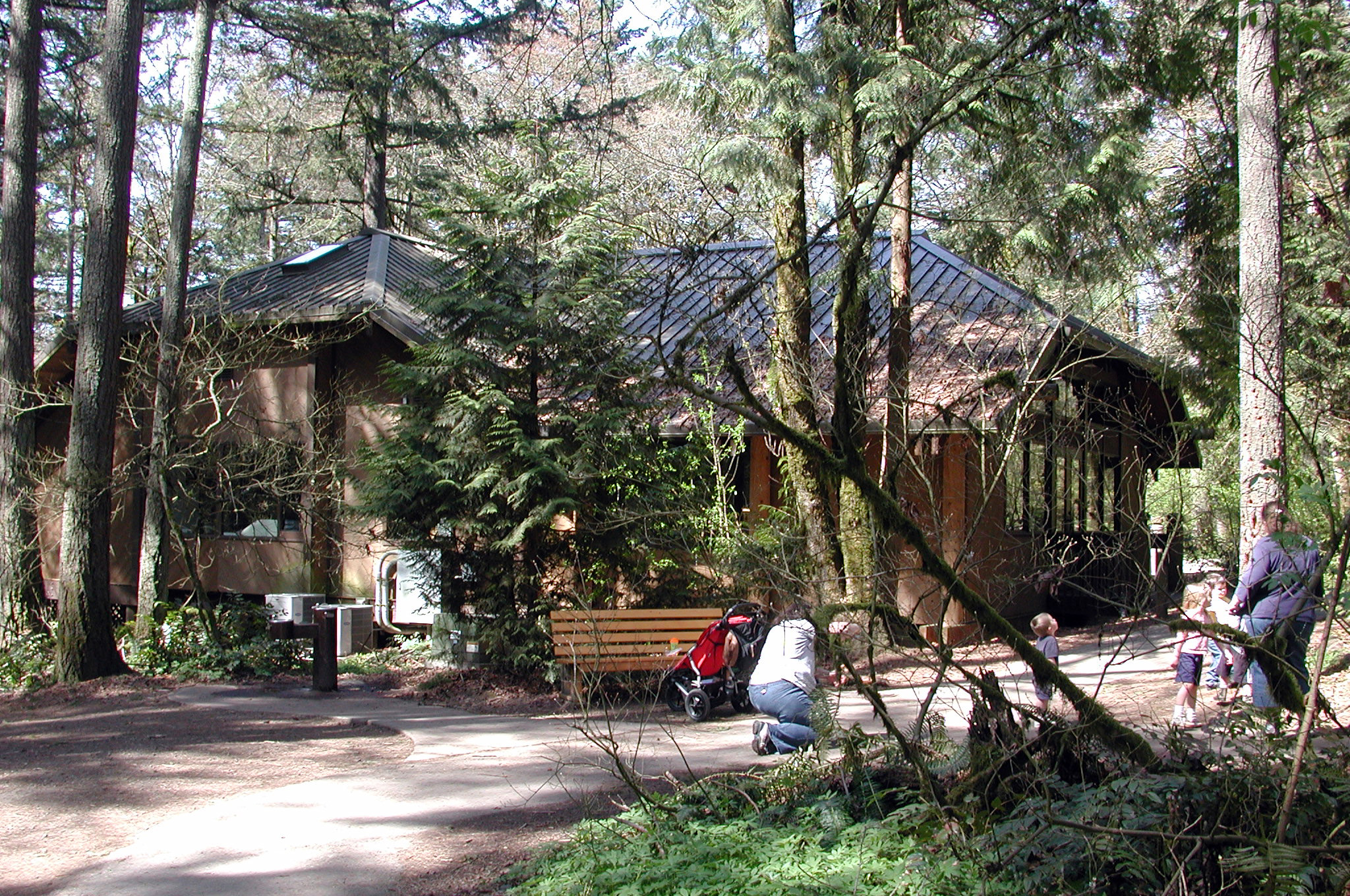
Nature Center at Tryon Creek State Natural Area

Parks in the Tryon Creek watershed include Tryon Creek State Natural Area, Oregon's only metropolitan state park. At about 630 acres (250 ha), the natural area is much larger than the watershed's other parks.

The state park includes a 3-mile (5 km) bicycle path that runs along Terwilliger Boulevard on the east edge of the park as part of the Portland metropolitan area's system of greenway trails known as the 40-Mile Loop. Equestrians can ride through the woods on horse trails totaling about 5 miles (8 km). Hikers can use the bike path, horse trails, and about 8 miles (13 km) of hiking trails. A paved loop trail of about 0.35-mile (0.56 km), furnished with drinking fountains and interpretive signs, can accommodate wheelchairs. A park building called the Nature Center houses a gift shop, a large classroom, space for educational exhibits, and a play area for small children.

Tryon Creek, which flows through the middle of the state park, also runs through Marshall Park, a modified natural area of about 26 acres (11 ha) in a canyon in the hills northwest of Mount Sylvania. It features hiking trails, a playground, picnic tables, a waterfall, and a stone bridge over the creek. Other parks in the watershed include West Portland Park, a natural area of about 15 acres (6 ha), Foley-Balmer Natural Area, and Maricara Park, a natural area of about 17 acres (7 ha). Metro plans to acquire additional land along the creek to add to the parks.

== See also ==
- List of rivers of Oregon

== Sources ==
- Bishop, Ellen Morris (2003). In Search of Ancient Oregon: A Geological and Natural History. Portland, Oregon: Timber Press. ISBN 978-0-88192-789-4.
- Houck, Mike; Cody, M. J., eds. (2000). Wild in the City: A Guide to Portland's Natural Areas. Portland: Oregon Historical Society Press. ISBN 0-87595-273-9.
- McArthur, Lewis A.; McArthur, Lewis L. (2003). Oregon Geographic Names (7th ed.). Portland: Oregon Historical Society Press. ISBN 0-87595-277-1.
- Portland Bureau of Environmental Services (2005). "Fanno and Tryon Creeks Watershed Management Plan" (PDF). City of Portland. Archived from the original on May 6, 2015.
