= Socrates Hotchkiss Tryon Sr. =

American physician

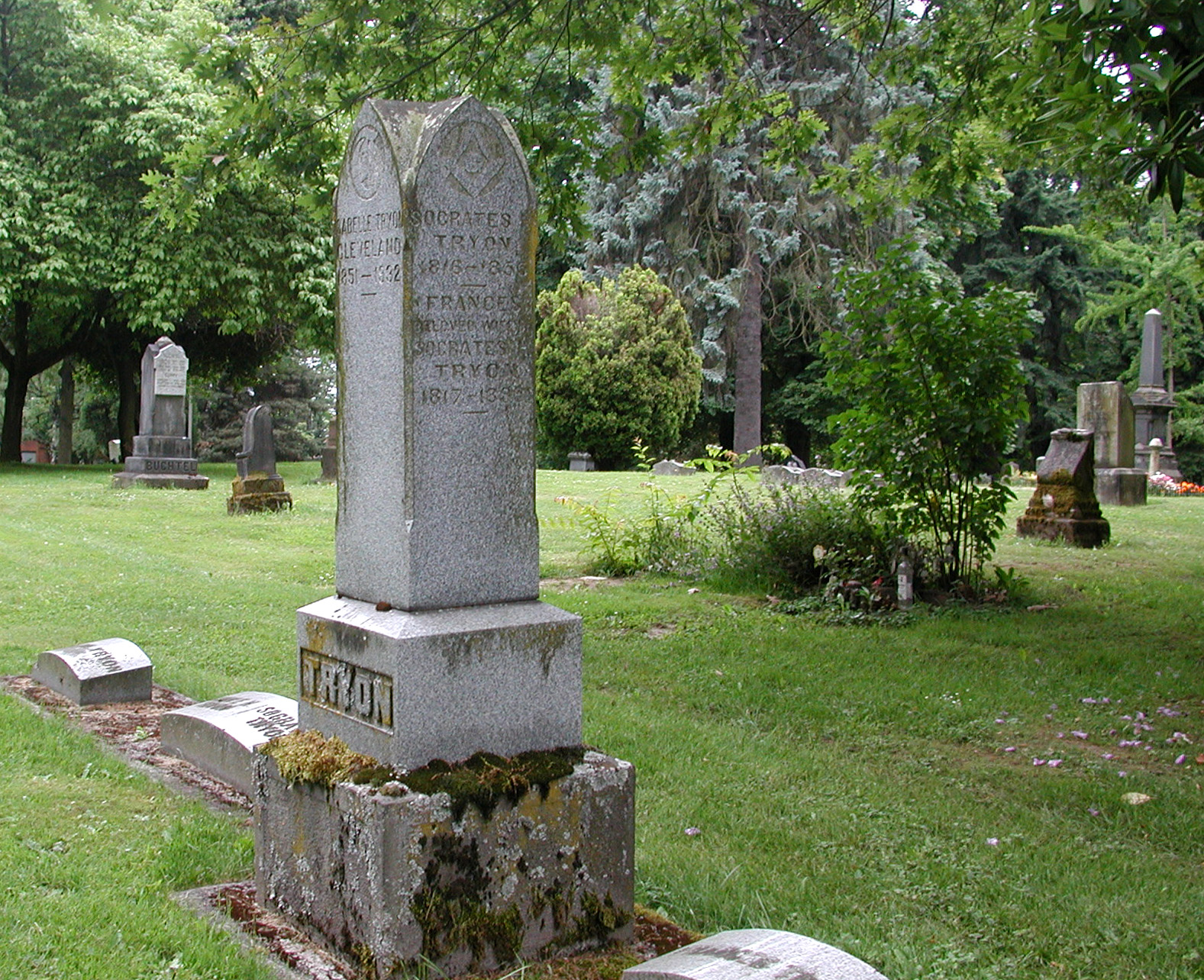
- The Tryon family graves are in Lone Fir Cemetery in southeast Portland
- Born: January 24, 1816; Pawlet Township, Vermont
- Died: May 15, 1855 (aged 39); Oregon
- Resting place: Lone Fir Cemetery; 45°31′05″N 122°38′31″W
- Education: Castleton Medical College
- Occupation: Physician
- Spouse: Frances Safley
- Children: Socrates Hotchkiss Tryon Jr.; Sallie Tryon Cleveland

Socrates Hotchkiss Tryon Sr. (January 24, 1816 – May 15, 1855) was a pioneer medical doctor in what became the U.S. state of Oregon. A native of Vermont, he later lived in Iowa and California before moving to the Oregon Territory where he settled the land that now comprises part of the Tryon Creek State Natural Area in Portland and Lake Oswego. He was also a member of the 1846 Iowa Constitutional Convention.

== Early life ==
Socrates Tryon was born on January 24, 1816, Pawlet Township, Vermont, to Laura Hotchkiss and Jesse Tryon. The younger Tryon was educated at Castleton Medical College in Rutland County, graduating in the Spring of 1836. His grandfather, Socrates Hotchkiss, was also a medical doctor in Vermont. Socrates Tryon later moved to Iowa Territory where he lived in Linn County and served as the clerk for the United States District Court in 1840. The territorial governor had appointed him as sheriff of the county in January 1839, but Tryon declined the position. Tryon represented Linn and Benton counties at Iowa's Second Constitutional Convention held in May 1846, which led to the admission of Iowa into the Union in December of that year. Tryon then moved to California with his wife, Frances (née Safley), and son, Socrates Hotchkiss Tryon Jr., before moving north to the Oregon Territory. There he was one of the first medical doctor in Oregon, settling a donation land claim in 1850 near what later became the city of Lake Oswego.

== Oregon ==
The Tryon house

The Tryons had a second child, Sallie, born in 1852. Tryon farmed land near what later became Stampher Road in Lake Oswego, built a sawmill, and constructed a house on the property. It was one of the few homes built in Clackamas County during the territorial period, 1848–59, before Oregon became a state. Described in Classic Houses of Portland Oregon, 1850–1950, the house was demolished in the 1990s. Prior to its demise, it was the only house in the Portland metropolitan area that remained on its original donation land claim. Rectangular in form, it was a rural farmhouse built on a foundation of brick and stone and included "greatly simplified" Greek Revival details. It stood on a promontory overlooking the Willamette River. Socrates Tryon died in Oregon on May 15, 1855, and was buried in Lone Fir Cemetery in southeast Portland. He left the land to his wife, which in 1869 she gave to Socrates Tryon Jr., Sallie, and her husband, A.A. Cleveland. In 1874 they sold the 645 acres (261 ha) to the Oregon Iron Company. Frances and Socrates Tryon Jr., were also buried at Lone Fir Cemetery.

== Legacy ==
For nearly 25 years, the company cut virgin cedar and fir on the old Tryon homestead to use in its foundry in Lake Oswego. More logging occurred from 1912 until 1961, and in 1969 Multnomah County bought part of the old property to use as a park. More land was added and a state park was created in 1970, later changed to Tryon Creek State Natural Area. Tryon Creek, which flows through Tryon Creek State Natural Area and the former Tryon property to join the Willamette River near Lake Oswego, was named for Tryon. The Oregon Iron Company's logging road later became Old Iron Mountain Trail in the state natural area.

== Works cited ==
- McArthur, Lewis A., and McArthur, Lewis L. (2003) Oregon Geographic Names, seventh edition. Portland: Oregon Historical Society Press. ISBN 0-87595-277-1.
