= Terwilliger curves =

Location map of the Terwilliger curves

The "Terwilliger curves" is the name given to a 1.7-mile (2.7 km), six-lane section of Interstate 5 (I-5) in Portland, Oregon, known as one of the most dangerous stretches of highway in the state. Named for its physical characteristics and proximity to Terwilliger Boulevard, it first opened in 1961 and soon became known for its high crash rate. Several upgrades, a reduction in the speed limit, and increased efforts to enforce traffic laws have had some success improving safety over the years, although crashes remain common.

== Characteristics ==
The Terwilliger curves comprise less than two miles (3.2 km) of I-5 between the Willamette River and bluffs of Southwest Portland. The area is described in most media accounts as covering 1.7 miles (2.7 km) from 26th Avenue to Iowa Street, although some sources place it between Spring Garden and Iowa streets. In 2005, an average of 132,603 drivers passed through the curves each day.

The road's curve changes "five times in just over a mile [1.6 km]", and conditions are further complicated by speeding drivers, high centers of gravity in modern vehicles (particularly SUVs), "poorly banked curves" and occasional accumulated precipitation. According to Oregon Department of Transportation (ODOT) engineering manager Walt Bartel, the curves are the "only stretch of I-5 where you can't see far enough ahead to safely drive faster than 55 [mph (90 km/h)]".

== Reputation ==
The Terwilliger curves are "notorious" for being one of the "most accident-prone stretches" of I-5 in Oregon, and a "flash point for crashes, congestion and commuter frustration". ODOT traffic safety data from 1991 to 1993 found the Terwilliger curves had 272 accidents for 1.15 accidents per 1 million vehicle miles traveled (0.71 accidents per 1 million km). A later study showed there were an average of 100 crashes per year between 1995 and 2005. The origin of the phrase "Terwilliger curves" is disputed. It was used frequently in traffic reports on KGW radio in the 1970’s. The term has since been adopted to name a thoroughbred race horse and an indie rock band.

== Construction and improvements ==
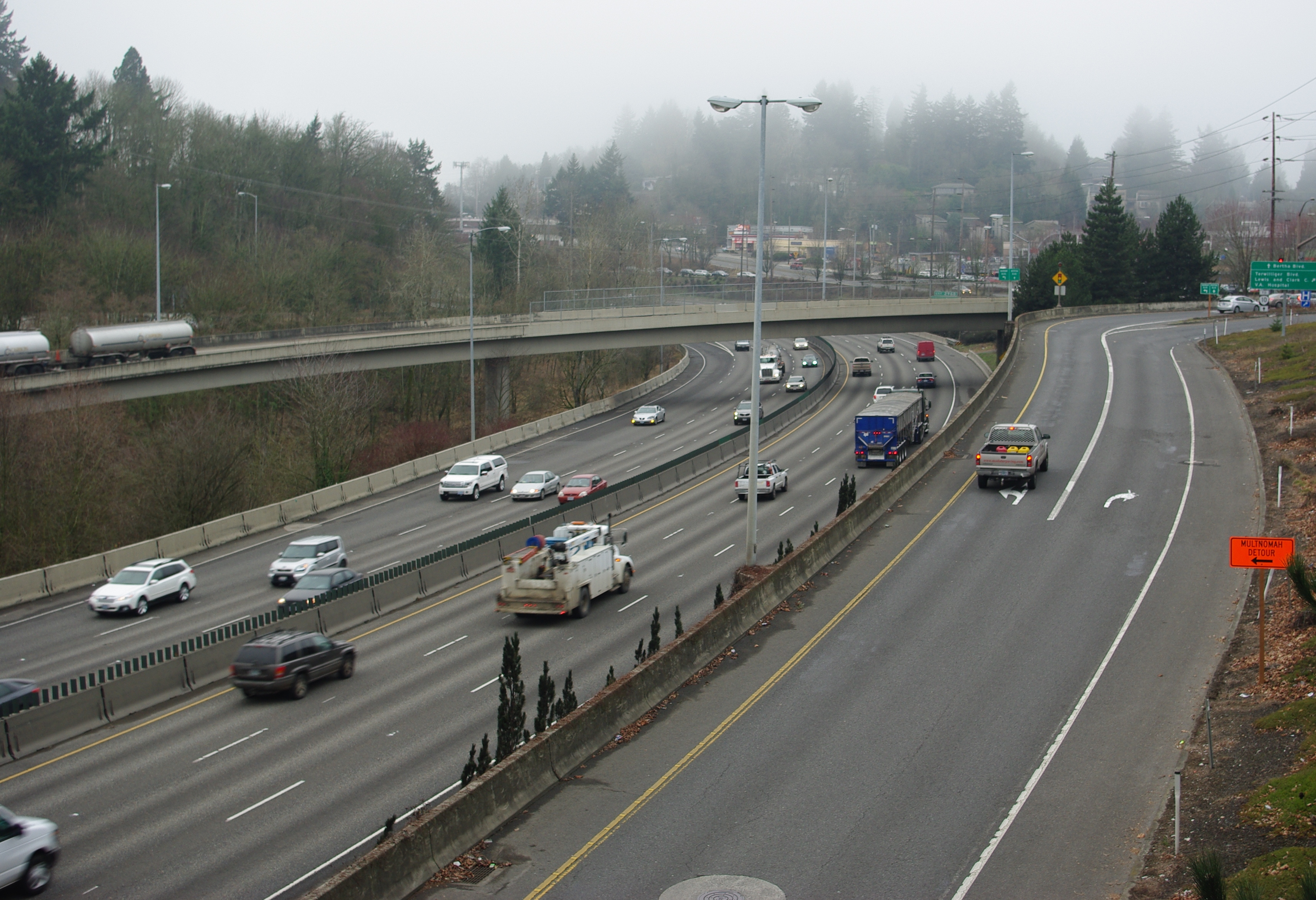
View of the curves from Terwilliger Boulevard looking south

The stretch of road now called the Terwilliger curves was first proposed as the "final segment" of I-5 in Oregon in the early 1950s, during a period of time when the completion of the Interstate Highway System sparked competition among state governments. Limited by "steep cliffs and unstable ground", preventing a straight line through the hills, Oregon state highway engineer R.H. "Sam" Baldock recommended the "twisty course" to a state panel in 1952. Although not an ideal path according to federal guidelines, "intense" pressure existed to lessen the burden on nearby Barbur Boulevard. Baldock advised that the panel should "act quickly" or real estate developers would "snap up" the properties, and the relevant authorities agreed to move forward.

=== 1960s to early 1990s ===
As early as 1970, state highway engineers reported that the area's accident rate exceeded the state average by 50 percent, declaring it one of the "five worst sections" for freeway accidents in the state. Between the 1970s and early 1990s, the state installed concrete dividers, lengthened entrance and exit ramps, and added guardrails, rumble strips, and reinforced barriers. The Terwilliger Boulevard interchange was rebuilt in 1992 to accommodate traffic flow.

According to The Oregonian, in the late 1980s a plan was drawn up by an ODOT engineer proposing gentler curves near Terwilliger Boulevard and Brier Place. However, the plan would interfere with a city park and existing homes in the neighborhood, making it politically infeasible.

=== Mid-1990s ===
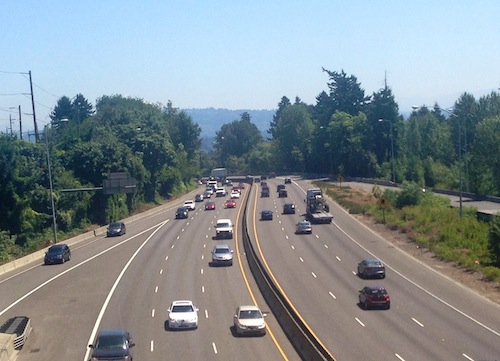
Northbound view onto the Terwilliger curves from Terwilliger Boulevard

In November 1995, the Portland Police Bureau (PPB), Oregon State Police (OSP), ODOT, and a local neighborhood association launched a "multipronged plan" to improve safety in the Terwilliger curves. Among the initiatives: lowering the speed limit from 55 to 50 mph (90 to 80 km/h), posting "better-illuminated signs" alerting drivers to dangers, increased enforcement of traffic laws, and the approval of $31,000 (including private, state and federal funds) for the creation of six parking pads to boost the police presence. In addition, the OSP announced "plans to put planes in the air twice a month to monitor traffic".

In the two months following, more than 1,100 tickets were handed out to motorists, mostly for speeding. Seven months later, having handed out more than 3,000 tickets, Portland police reported an 80 percent reduction in accident rates.

According to ODOT, traffic accidents were cut in half during the first year of the program; just 15 calls to 9-1-1 regarding accidents in the Terwilliger curves were made in November 1996, compared to 48 in November 1995. The following year, Portland police reported an overall increase in traffic citations was mostly due to photo radar in the Terwilliger curves, issuing more than 5,400 citations from November 1995 to October 1996. However, when police reduced their patrols, accident reports rose once again.

=== 2000s to present day ===
Beginning in 2004, a $23 million "safety improvement project" was begun, installing "flashing yellow warning lights at the north end of the curves", repaving the road, adding "reflective road striping" and renovations to nine concrete slabs for PPD squad cars to park and "aim their radar guns". PPD officer Tom Larson, nicknamed "Terwilliger Tom" for his patrol of the area, has described it as a situation without a solution: "No matter how hard you enforce the limit, there's always gonna be a numbskull coming by and screwing it up."

In 2005, state officials said there are "no plans for extensive work" on the road in the next 20 years, noting that only two deaths occurred in the area in the previous 18 years.

== See also ==
- List of streets in Portland, Oregon
