= Eliza Barchus =

American painter (1857–1959)

Eliza R. Barchus
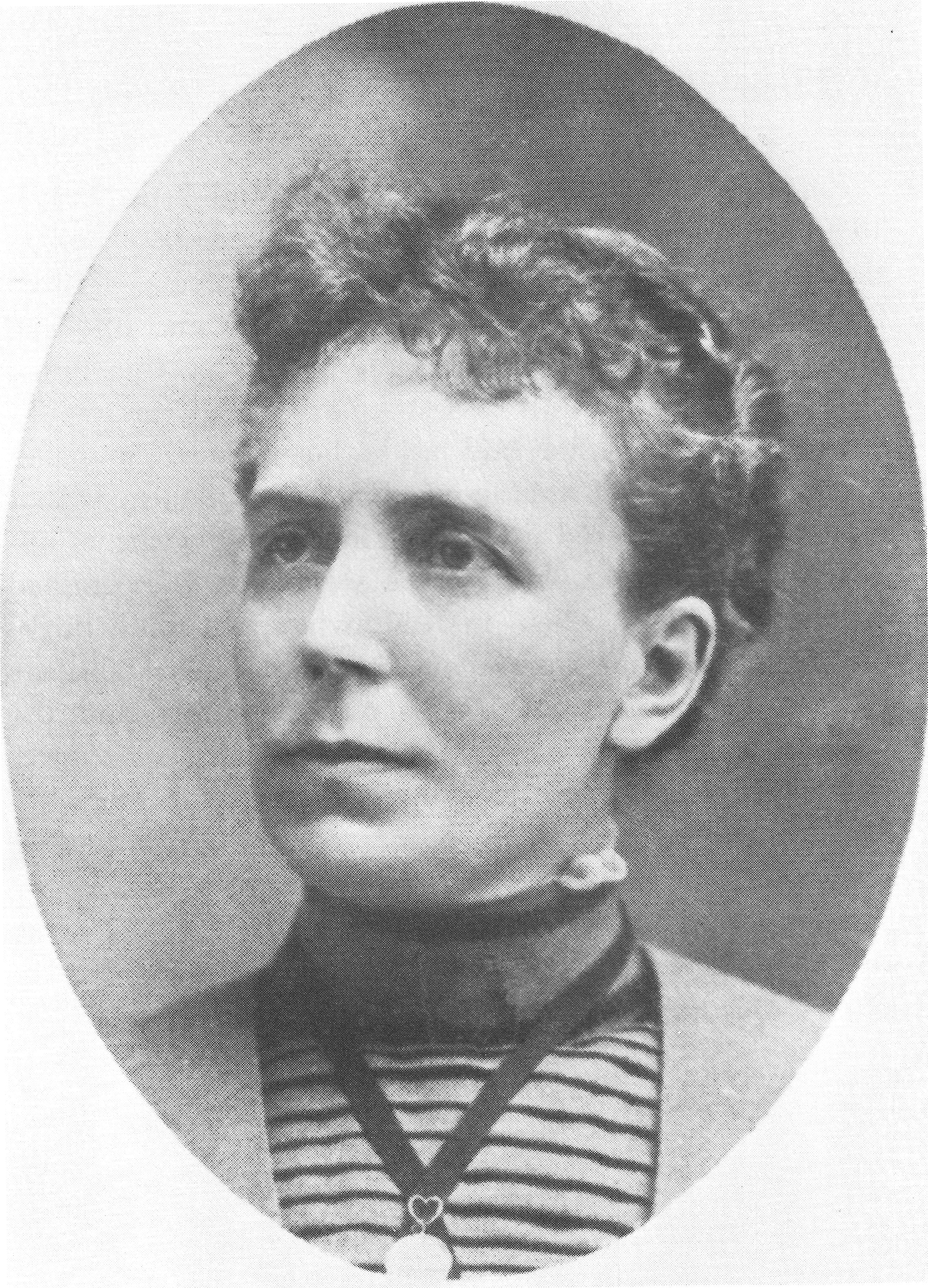
- Born: Eliza Rosanna Lamb; December 4, 1857; Salt Lake City, Utah, US
- Died: December 31, 1959 (aged 102); Portland, Oregon, US
- Resting place: Lone Fir Cemetery; 45°31′05″N 122°38′31″W
- Occupation: Painter
- Known for: Western U.S. landscape paintings
- Spouse(s): John V. Lansing; John H. Barchus
- Children: Four

Eliza Barchus (December 4, 1857 – December 31, 1959) was an American landscape painter who lived in Portland for most of her life. Born in Salt Lake City, Utah, Barchus moved to Portland in 1880. After taking art lessons from another landscape painter, Will S. Parrott, Barchus sold her first painting in 1885. Between then and 1935, she produced thousands of oil paintings and reproductions of subjects such as Mount Hood, Yellowstone Falls, Muir Glacier, and San Francisco Bay.

Barchus, who had won medals at Mechanics Fairs in Portland in the late 1880s, drew national attention in 1890, when one of her large canvases of Mount Hood was displayed at the National Academy of Design exhibition in New York City. In 1901, several of her works were shown at the Pan-American Exposition in Buffalo, New York, and in 1905 she won a gold medal at the Lewis and Clark Centennial Exposition in Portland for oil paintings of Pacific coast scenery.

Widowed in 1899, Barchus supported herself and her family for decades largely by selling or trading her art. Several years after her death at age 102, the Oregon Legislative Assembly named her "The Oregon Artist". Many art collections in Portland and elsewhere include examples of her work.

== Early life ==
Born in Salt Lake City, Utah, in 1857, Barchus could not recall much about her father, Abel Lamb, who died when she was very young. After his death, her mother, Elizabeth Esnouf, married Jack McDonald, an itinerant laborer and Deputy U.S. Marshal, and the family moved east to Abilene, Kansas. McDonald's work involved railroad construction, and Barchus and her mother, leading what Barchus called a "gypsy life", often traveled with him by wagon. Among the people Barchus met on their travels was Wild Bill Hickok. A half-sister, Alice, was born when Barchus was nine years old. A brother, Johnny, died at an early age.

== Marriages and children ==
At age 17, Barchus married John V. Lansing, with whom she had two children, Isabel (Belle) and Blanche, before the marriage failed. Blanche died in infancy, but Isabel, born in 1876, accompanied Barchus and her second husband, John H. Barchus, to Portland in 1880. Lillian, their first child, died at birth. A son, Harold, was born in 1891, followed two years later by a daughter, Agnes, who eventually became her mother's biographer. John Barchus, who had been in poor health for years, died in 1899.

== Painting ==
In 1884, Barchus, who admired Western landscapes, began taking art lessons from Will S. Parrott, "the foremost artist of that era in Portland." (Note: William Samuel Parrott (1843–1915), educated at the San Francisco Museum of Art, specialized in oil paintings of lakes and mountains. He maintained an art studio in downtown Portland from 1867 through 1887 and taught students there, often by having them watch him paint. Many art collections include mountain landscapes by Parrott; one of his paintings of Mount Hood was hung in the Louvre.) About a year later she sold her first painting, of Mount Rainier, for $1. In 1887 she won a gold medal at the Portland Mechanics Fair Art Exhibition for a painting of Mount Hood, and in 1888 she won a silver medal at the Mechanics Fair for a group of her oil paintings. In 1890, her 40-by-60-inch (100 by 150 cm) oil painting of Mount Hood at the National Academy of Design exhibition in New York City attracted an eastern audience.

After 1890, the B. B. Rich cigar and souvenir concession at the Portland Hotel agreed to display and market her paintings. The concession sold many works from her most productive period, which extended to about 1920. Her husband, who went south in winter in the 1890s to try to improve his health, persuaded the Lichtenberger Art Emporium in Los Angeles to sell his wife's paintings as well. During these years, to supplement the family income Barchus began bartering paintings for work by carpenters, plumbers, and other tradesmen, as well as professional services from a dentist and a physician.

In 1901, Barchus exhibited several oil paintings at the Pan-American Exposition in Buffalo, New York. Four years later, she won a gold medal for the "Finest Collection of Oil Paintings of Pacific Coast Scenery" at the Lewis and Clark Centennial Exposition in Portland. To augment her income, she sold—in addition to full-sized paintings—modestly priced color postcards and illustrated brochures with reproductions of her work. These marketing techniques helped support the family after Barchus became a widow, and she produced thousands of works of various sizes in an "assembly-line" style that was effective but sometimes criticized.

Traveling extensively in the Western United States from the 1890s through about 1920, she painted Cascade Range volcanoes such as Three Sisters, Mount Shasta, and Crater Lake; the Columbia River Gorge; Yellowstone Falls; Half Dome in Yosemite National Park; San Francisco Bay; Muir Glacier in Alaska, and hundreds of other spots. While at home in Portland and during her travels, she taught painting classes in Salem and other Oregon cities as well as in Washington, Montana, and Alaska to augment her income.

Barchus continued to work in oils through the 1930s, putting on a one-artist exhibit in 1931 at the Merchant's Exposition during the Portland International Livestock Show and taking part in a public art project administered by the U.S. Treasury Department in 1934. Failing eyesight and arthritis ended her career in 1935.

== Death and legacy ==
Barchus died in 1959 at age 102 and was buried in Lone Fir Cemetery—near the graves of her mother, husband John, daughter Belle, and infant Lillie—in a family plot she had bought in 1899. Twelve years later, the Oregon Legislative Assembly named her "The Oregon Artist." In the 21st century, the collections of the Portland Art Museum; the Oregon Historical Society; Pittock Mansion; Crater Lake National Park; the Bancroft Library at the University of California, Berkeley; the Chicago Historical Society, and many others include examples of her work.

== Notes and references ==
Notes

== Works cited ==
- Allen, Ginny, and Klevit, Jody (1999). Oregon Painters: The First Hundred Years (1859–1959). Portland, Oregon: Oregon Historical Society Press. ISBN 0-87595-271-2.
- Barchus, Agnes (1974). Eliza R. Barchus: The Oregon Artist. Portland, Oregon: Binford & Mort. ISBN 0-8323-0245-7.
