= Terwilliger Boulevard =

Street in Portland, Oregon, U.S.

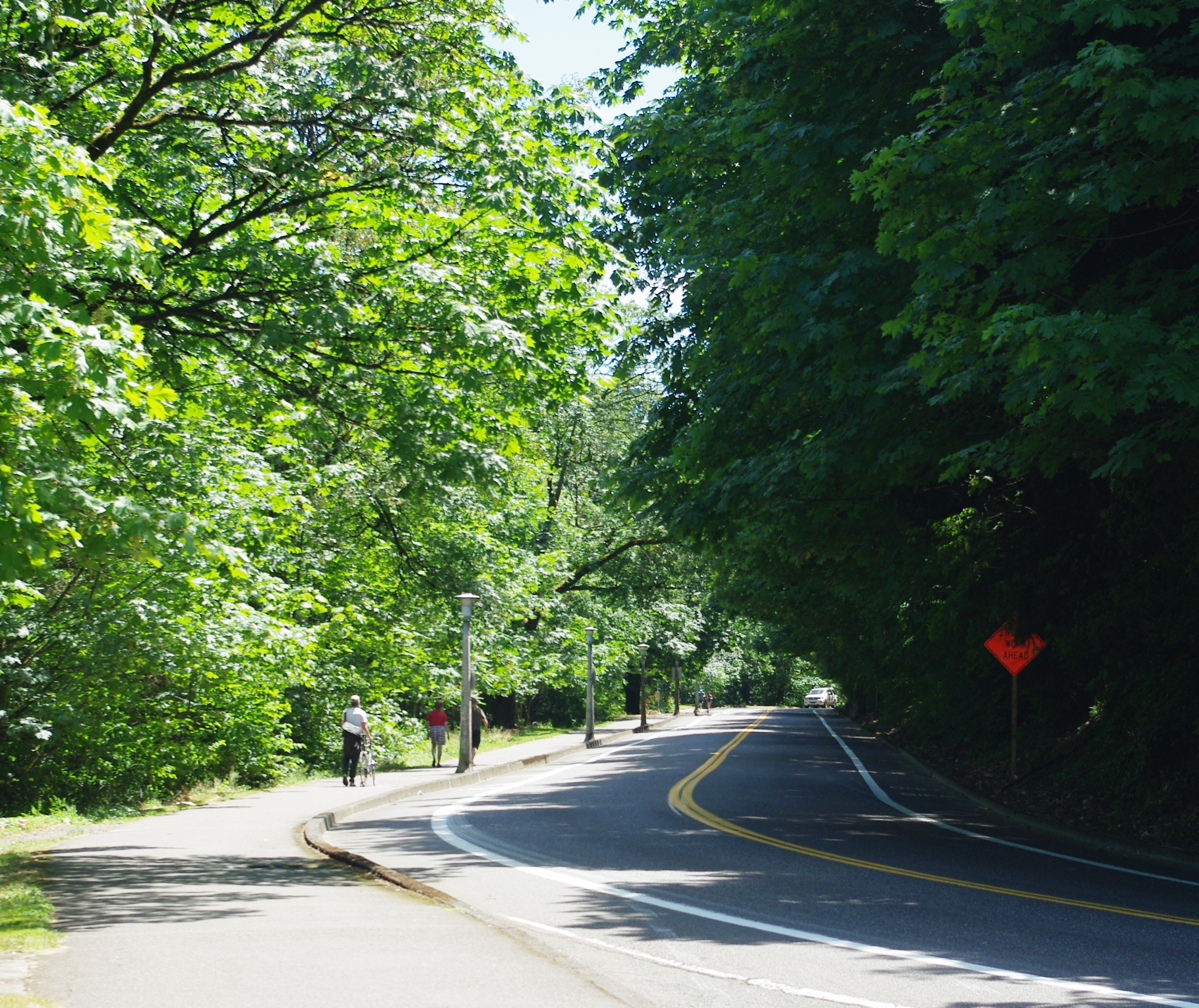
- Terwilliger Boulevard at Duniway Park overlook
- Maintained by: City of Portland
- Length: 7.4 mi (11.9 km)
- Location: Portland, Oregon, United States
- North end: Southwest 6th Avenue
- South end: Oregon State Route 43

Terwilliger Boulevard is a street in Portland, Oregon, U.S. It begins at SW 6th Avenue and SW Sheridan Street south of Portland State University. It passes through the neighborhoods of Marquam Hill, Southwest Hills, and Burlingame and by Lewis and Clark College before ending at Oregon Route 43 in Lake Oswego. For portions of its route, it is a traditional parkway through Duniway and Marquam Parks. The land surrounding Terwilliger Boulevard is heavily wooded in nature.

The road was first planned for use as a pleasure parkway in the 1903 park plan prepared by the Olmsted Brothers. The parkway was completed in 1915. It is named for James Terwilliger, who owned the land on which the parkway was built. The roadway, or portions of it, were listed on the National Register of Historic Places in 2021.

It is the namesake of the Terwilliger curves, one of the most dangerous stretches of I-5 in Oregon, and possibly also The Simpsons character Robert Terwilliger / Sideshow Bob.

== Points of interest ==
(listed north to south)

- Duniway Park
- Oregon Health & Science University campus, including
  - Portland Aerial Tram
  - Shriners Hospital
  - Portland VA Medical Center
- Terwilliger Parkway
- Marquam Nature Park
- Capitol Highway
- George Himes Park
- Barbur Boulevard
- Interstate 5
- Taylors Ferry Road
- Boones Ferry Road
- Tryon Creek State Natural Area

== Transit ==
North of Capitol Highway (shared by Oregon Route 10 in the area where Terwilliger crosses), the street is served by TriMet bus line 8, and south of Capitol Highway bus lines 38 and 39 serve some sections of it.

== See also ==
- List of streets in Portland, Oregon
