= Arnold–Park Log Home =

Historic building in Portland, Oregon, U.S.

- U.S. National Register of Historic Places
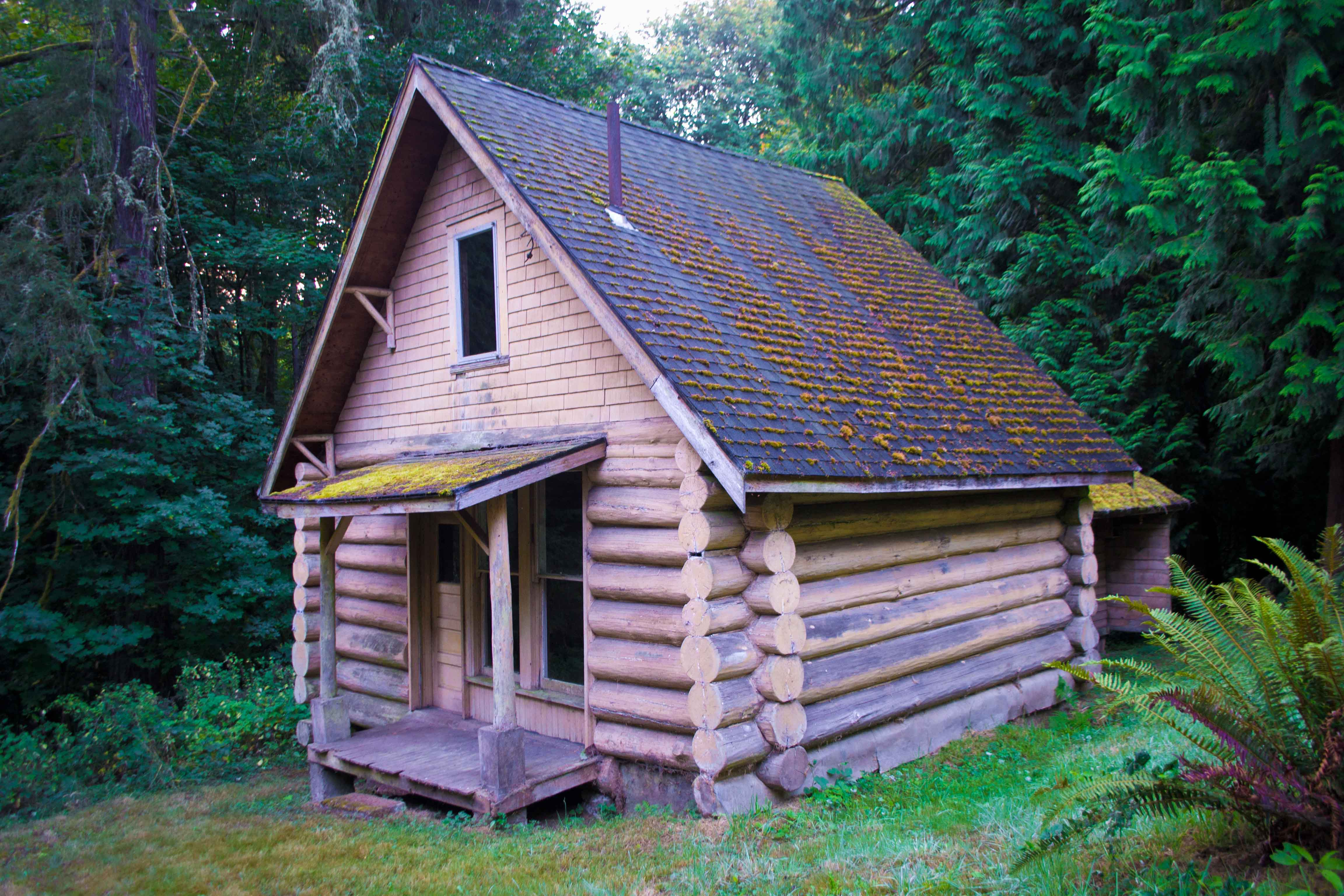

- Location within Portland, Oregon
- Location: 12000 SW Boones Ferry Road, Portland, Oregon
- Coordinates: 45°26′15″N 122°41′22″W
- Area: .11 acres (0.045 ha)
- Built: 1907–1917
- Architect: John Arnold (builder/owner)
- Architectural style: Craftsman log cabin
- NRHP reference No.: 10000016
- Added to NRHP: February 12, 2010

The Arnold–Park Log Home is a historic house, located in Portland, Oregon, United States. It is listed on the National Register of Historic Places, and is preserved by the State of Oregon within the Tryon Creek State Natural Area.
