= List of streets in Portland, Oregon =

Interactive map of Portland

Much of the U. S. city of Portland, Oregon is built to a grid plan oriented north/south and east/west. However, the streets in the central downtown area are aligned to magnetic north—presumably at the time the area was platted—and so is oriented about 19.25° eastward.

The city is rated highly in "walkability", bicycle-friendliness and public transport provision. Urban growth has been controlled by the Metro planning authority since the 1970s.

== Principal streets ==
- 82nd Avenue
- Beaverton-Hillsdale Highway
- Broadway
- Burnside Street, east–west, runs uninterrupted on both sides of the Willamette River, serves as the dividing line between North Portland and South Portland
- Canyon Road
- Capitol Highway
- Campesinos Boulevard, formerly known as Northeast and Southeast 39th Avenue, and Cesar Chavez Boulevard.
- Cornell Road
- Division Street
- Harbor Drive
- Martin Luther King Jr. Blvd., formerly Union Avenue (renamed in 1989). Carries Oregon Route 99E.
- Klickitat Street
- Hawthorne Boulevard
- Lombard Street
- Naito Parkway
- Williams Avenue, a north-south street that defines the eastern boundary of North Portland
- Stark Street (part of which has been designated Harvey Milk Street)
- Terwilliger Boulevard

== See also ==
- Terwilliger curves
- The Simpsons and Portland, Oregon – many characters in The Simpsons are named after Portland streets
- Transportation in Portland, Oregon
