= Lone Fir Cemetery =

Historic cemetery in Portland, Oregon, U.S.

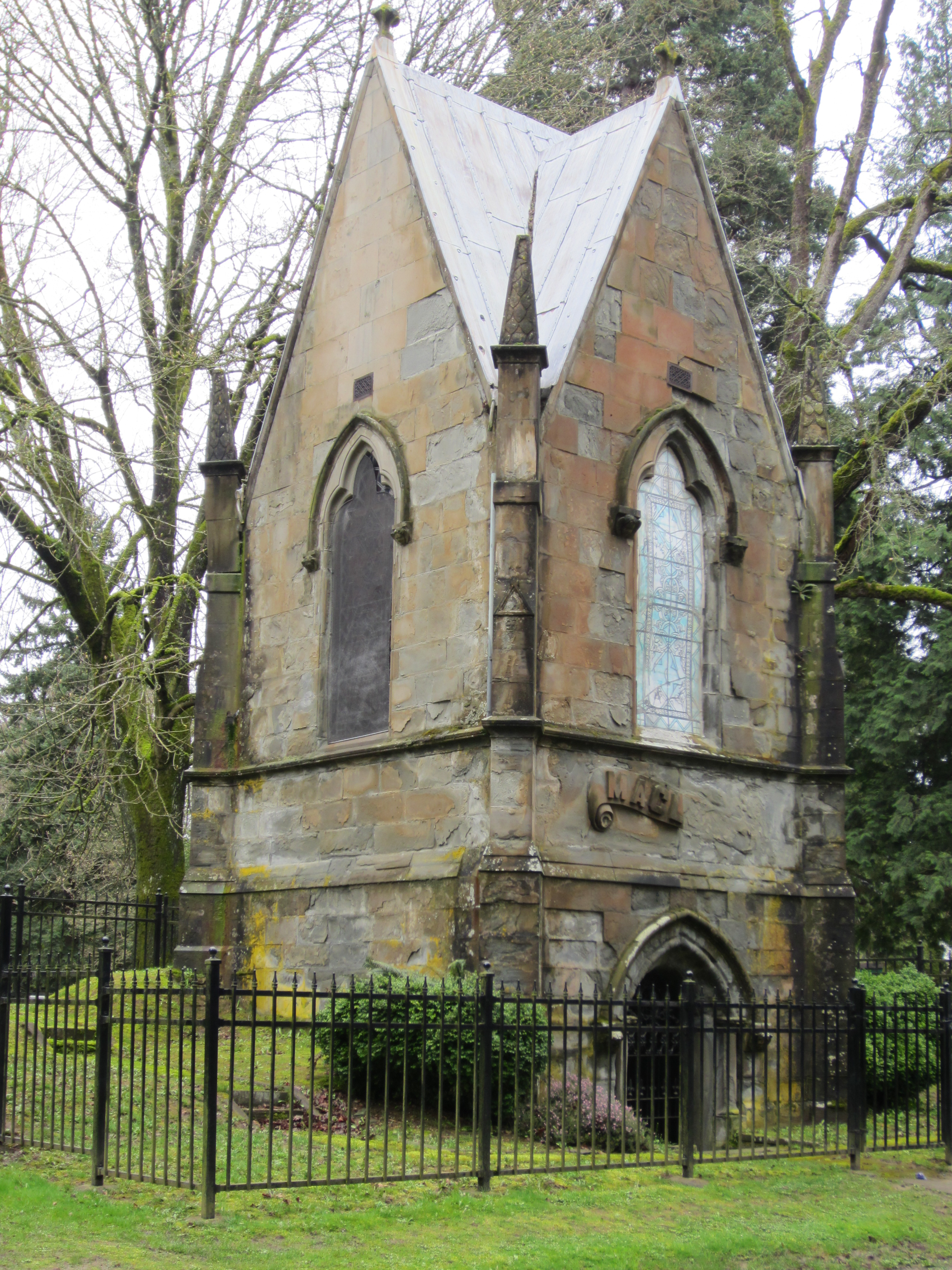
- MacLeay family mausoleum
- Interactive map of Lone Fir Cemetery

Details
- Established: 1855
- Location: Portland, Oregon
- Country: United States
- Coordinates: 45°31′05″N 122°38′32″W
- Type: Public
- Owned by: Metro
- Size: 30.5 acres (12.3 ha)
- No. of graves: 25,000+
- Website: official site
- Lone Fir Cemetery
- U.S. National Register of Historic Places
- U.S. Historic district
- Portland Historic Landmark
- Location: 2115 SE Morrison Street; Portland, Oregon
- Architectural style: Late Gothic Revival
- NRHP reference No.: 07000824
- Added to NRHP: August 16, 2007

Lone Fir Cemetery, in the southeast section of Portland, Oregon, United States, is a cemetery owned and maintained by Metro, a regional government entity. Listed on the National Register of Historic Places, the first burial was in 1846 with the cemetery established in 1855. Lone Fir has over 25,000 burials spread over more than 30 acres (120,000 m^{2}).

== History ==
=== 19th and 20th centuries ===
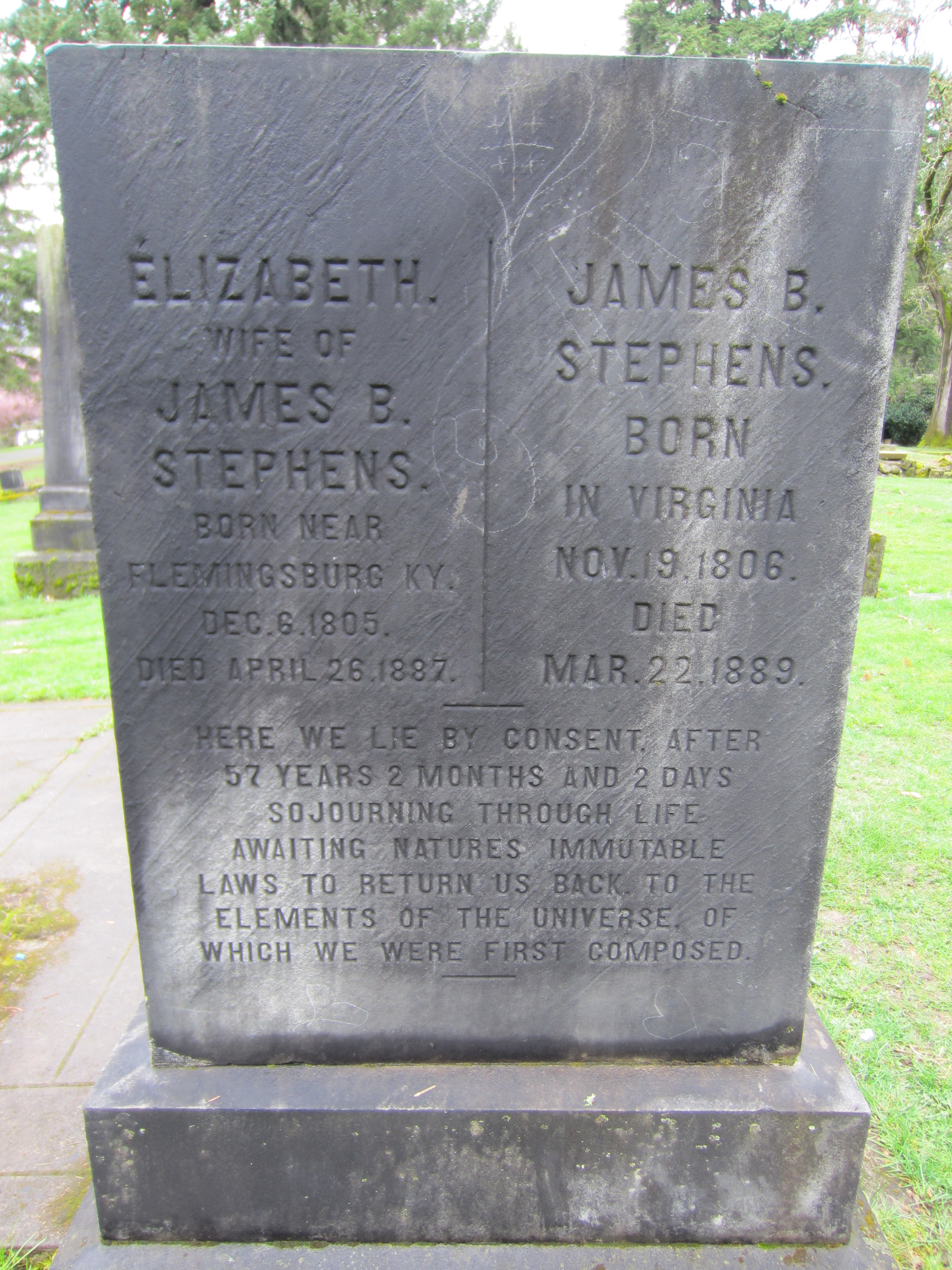
Grave of James B. and Elizabeth Stephens, donors of the land

The original land owner, James B. Stephens, purchased a land claim extending from the east bank of the Willamette River to present day Southeast 23rd and from Stark Street to Division Street. J. B. Stephens' father Emmor Stephens died shortly after the Stephens family arrived to Oregon in 1846 and was buried on the family farm. In 1854, Stephens sold the land to Colburn Barrell, with the caveat that he maintain Emmor's gravesite. Barrell owned a steamboat the Gazelle, which in 1854 exploded near Oregon City, killing a passenger and Barrell's business partner Crawford Dobbins. Barrel then set up a cemetery by setting aside 10 acres (40,000 m^{2}) and burying the casualties of the explosion at the site of Emmor Stephens, calling it Mt. Crawford.

Plots at the cemetery were then sold for $10 with 20 acres (81,000 m^{2}) additional being added to Lone Fir by 1866. That year Barrel offered to sell the cemetery to the city of Portland for $4,000, but the city declined and instead Barrell sold it to a group of Portland families and plotholders. The cemetery was then renamed the cemetery to Lone Fir, which was suggested by Colburn Barrell's wife, Aurelia, as there was only a single fir tree at the site.

In 1903, a $3,500 memorial to the soldiers of the Indian Wars, Mexican–American War, the American Civil War, and the Spanish–American War was built at the cemetery. The Soldier's Monument was paid for by donations by over 500 citizens. Then in 1928 Multnomah County took over control and maintenance of Lone Fir. In 1947 the county paved part of the cemetery and later constructed a building on the site. This was the location of many Chinese graves, which were removed the next year.

=== 21st century ===
In 2004 it was discovered that more graves of Chinese persons likely remained at the site. In 2005 city leaders proposed removing the government building that was constructed over the graves of these Chinese immigrants and re-connecting that portion with the main cemetery; it was removed in August 2007. In January 2007 Metro took over control of this section of the cemetery after a transfer from the county. On August 16, 2007, the cemetery was added to the National Register of Historic Places. On November 25, 2020, the portion of cemetery's war memorial honoring Mexican-American soldiers was vandalized with graffiti, The statue which stood atop this section of the war memorial was toppled and vandalized with graffiti as well.

Currently the cemetery is located between Stark Street on the north and Morrison Street to the south, with Southeast 20th Avenue bounding on the west and Southeast 26th on the east. Lone Fir covers 30.5 acres (123,000 m^{2}) and has over 25,000 graves, with over 10,000 of those unknown due to poor maintenance. It is home to the Pioneer Rose Garden.

== Notable burials ==
The cemetery is the resting place for several former mayors of the city, as well as other politicians and famous citizens.

- Eliza Barchus (1857–1959), landscape painter
- J. A. Chapman (1821–1855), Mayor of Portland
- William Williams Chapman (1808–1892), U.S. Representative from Iowa Territory
- George Edward Cole (1826–1906), postmaster of Portland, Territorial Governor of Washington
- George Law Curry (1820–1878), Governor of Oregon Territory
- Thomas J. Dryer (1808–1879), first editor of The Oregonian newspaper
- Alma Francis (1890–1968), Broadway and silent film actress
- Melvin Clark George (1849–1933), U.S. Representative
- James C. Hawthorne, founder of Oregon Hospital for the Insane
- Frederick Van Voorhies Holman, attorney and city promoter
- Harry Lane (1855–1917), Mayor of Portland, U.S. Senator
- Asa Lovejoy (1808–1882), delegate to the Oregon Constitutional Convention and a founder of Portland
- Esther Pohl Lovejoy (1869–1967), physician and public health pioneer, suffrage activist, and congressional candidate
- Daniel H. Lownsdale
- Benjamin Wistar Morris (bishop)
- William S. Newbury (1834–1915), Oregon lawyer and Mayor of Portland
- Earl Riley, mayor of Portland
- Harriet Redmond, suffragist
- Henry S. Rowe, mayor of Portland
- Samuel L. Simpson, poet
- William Wallace Thayer (1827–1899), Governor of Oregon, Chief Justice of the Oregon Supreme Court
- Socrates H. Tryon, namesake for Tryon Creek State Natural Area

== See also ==
- Anti-Chinese violence in Oregon
- Hillsboro Pioneer Cemetery
- River View Cemetery (Portland, Oregon)
- List of cemeteries in Oregon
