= James Terwilliger =

American pioneer (1809–1892)

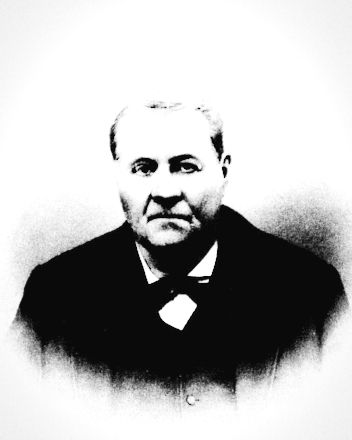
- Born: October 3, 1809; Marbletown, New York
- Died: September 1, 1892 (aged 82); Portland, Oregon
- Resting place: River View Cemetery; 45.465408°N 122.673090°W
- Occupations: Blacksmith, tanner, farmer
- Years active: 1845–1892
- Known for: Terwilliger Boulevard; Terwilliger School
- Spouse(s): Sophronia Ann Hurd (1809 – 1845); Philinda Green (1811–1873)
- Children: Lorenzo, John, Asa, Hiram, Charlotte; Mary, Alonzo, Julia
- Parent(s): Cornelius and Annette Terwilliger

James Terwilliger (October 3, 1809 – September 1, 1892) was an Oregon pioneer and one of the first English-speaking settlers of Portland, Oregon. He is the namesake of Portland's Terwilliger Boulevard and Terwilliger School.

== Early life ==
Terwilliger was born in 1809 to parents Cornelius and Annette Terwilliger. He was raised in Ulster County, New York, and became a blacksmith, opening a shop in 1832 at Towanda, Pennsylvania. He continued his trade in Ithaca, New York, and married Sophronia Ann Hurd. Then in 1839 he became a farmer in Ohio, then moved to Illinois and eventually to Michigan. He returned to Illinois and sold his property in preparation for an overland journey to the Oregon Country in 1844.

Terwilliger joined a 100-wagon train under the leadership of Sam Parker, John Stewart, and Abner Hackleman. His property included five yoke of oxen, two wagons, and thirteen cows. Most of the company took the Meek Cutoff, and many travelers along that route died of camp fever, including Sophronia Terwilliger.

== Arrival in Portland ==
Terwilliger arrived in the Portland area in 1845. That same year, the settlement was named by early residents Asa Lovejoy and Francis Pettygrove. Filing a provisional land claim of 640 acres in what later became southeast Portland, Terwilliger began farming.

In 1845 or 1846 he purchased a lot at what is now SW First Avenue and Morrison Street and built a cabin with a blacksmith shop. Soon thereafter, Terwilliger purchased a Donation Land Claim in southwest Portland in the area of Terwilliger Boulevard.

== Later life ==
=== Second marriage ===
In 1847 Terwilliger married Philinda Green.

=== Gold Rush ===
He joined the California Gold Rush in 1848, returning in 1849 with a small amount of gold dust.

=== Caruthers Cemetery ===
In 1854 Terwilliger and his neighbor, Finice Caruthers, each donated five acres to the City of Portland for a cemetery. Known as either the Caruthers Cemetery or the Old Cemetery, the location was bounded by SW Abernethy, SW Macadam, SW Bancroft, and SW Corbett.

=== Schools ===
Three of the Terwilliger children (John, Lorenzo, and Charlotte) attended classes taught by Ralph Wilcox at Portland's first school in 1847. Terwilliger joined others in calling for a school closer to his property near the Macadamized Road, and the Stephens School was erected in 1868. A school designed by Floyd Naramore and named for Terwilliger opened at 6318 SW Corbett Avenue in 1916.

== Terwilliger Parkway ==
In 1909 the heirs of James Terwilliger deeded property to the City of Portland for construction of a parkway through what was left of Terwilliger's Donation Land Claim. The parkway includes other deeded lands, and runs over three miles from Duniway Park to SW Barbur Boulevard; it was identified for this use in the 1903 Olmsted Portland park plan.

== The Simpsons ==
Native Portland resident Matt Groening, creator of The Simpsons, named the evil genius Sideshow Bob Terwilliger after Terwilliger Blvd.

== See also ==
- History of Portland, Oregon
