= Frederick Van Voorhies Holman =

Lawyer and civic leader from Portland

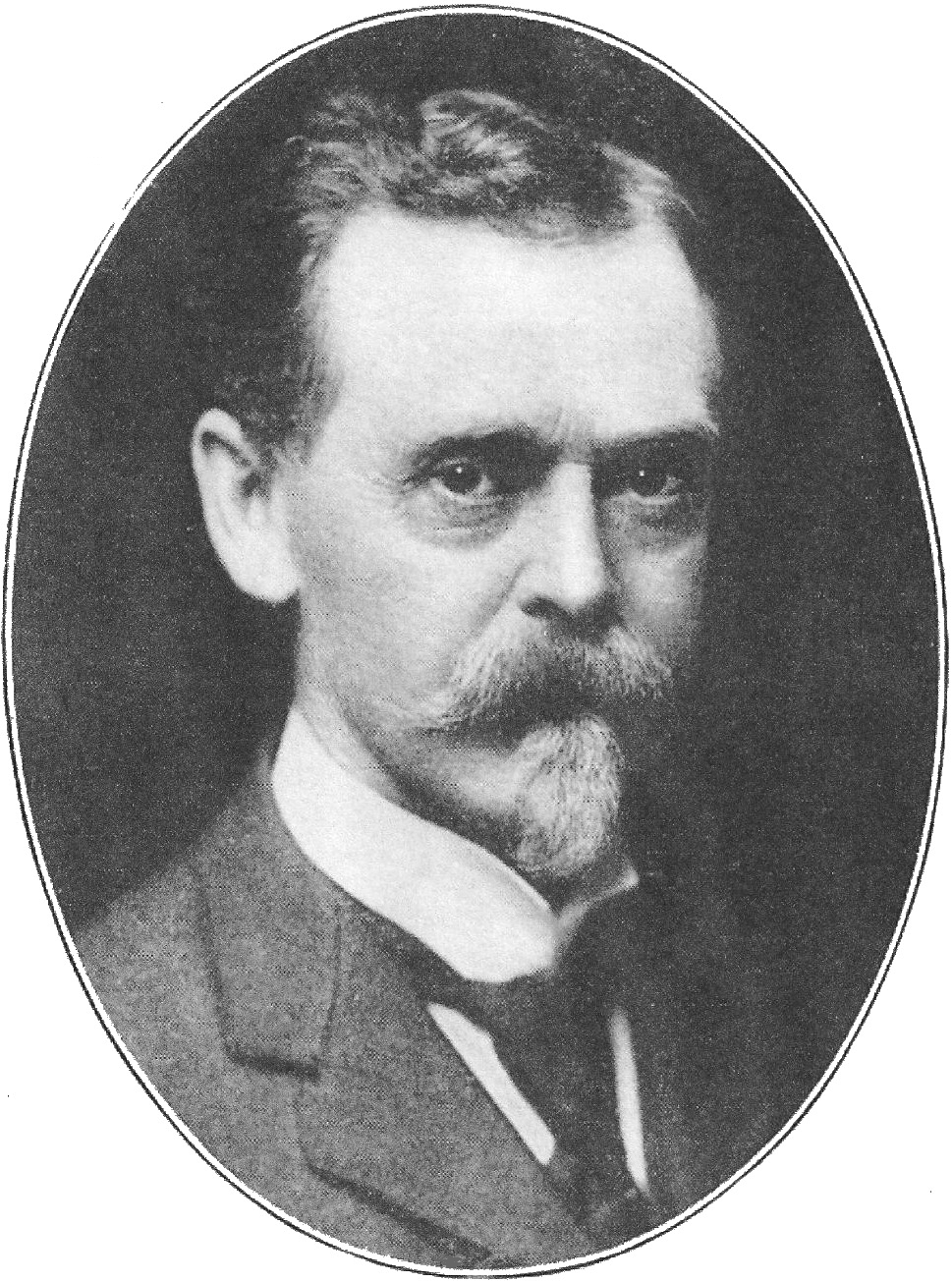
- Born: August 29, 1852; Pacific County, Washington, which was then part of Oregon Territory
- Died: July 6, 1927 (aged 74); Portland, Oregon
- Resting place: Lone Fir Cemetery, Portland, Oregon
- Education: bachelor of philosophy (Ph.B.)
- Alma mater: University of California, Berkeley
- Occupation: lawyer
- Known for: legal, civic, and political work; biography of John McLoughlin; love of roses; donation of land that became Holman Park, a part of Forest Park
- Parent(s): James Duval Holman and Rachel Hixson (Summers) Holman

Frederick Van Voorhies Holman (August 29, 1852 – July 6, 1927) was a prominent lawyer and civic leader of the late 19th and early 20th centuries in Portland in the U.S. state of Oregon. Legal counsel for the Portland Railway, Light and Power Company and other businesses, he was active in Democratic Party politics and in civic organizations. President of the Oregon Historical Society from 1908 to 1927, he was known for his biography of John McLoughlin. A great admirer of roses, Holman helped organize the Portland Rose Society and is credited with giving Portland one of its nicknames, "Rose City". A parcel of land once owned by Holman became Holman Park, which was later merged with other parks and parcels to form Portland's Forest Park in 1948.

== Ancestry and early life ==
Holman's parents were James Duval Holman and Rachel Hixson (Summers) Holman, both originally from Kentucky. Holman's great-grandfather, Thomas Holman, emigrated from England to South Carolina in 1730. His grandfather, John Holman, born in Kentucky, fought in the War of 1812 and emigrated to Oregon in 1843. His father, James Duval Holman, one of the founders of Pacific City, moved to Portland in 1857. The J.D. Holman School in Portland was named in his honor.

One of eight children, Frederick Van Voorhies Holman was born in Pacific County, Washington, in what was then part of the Oregon Territory. He attended public and private schools in Portland and graduated from the Portland Academy and Female Seminary in 1868. He attended the University of California, Berkeley, from which he graduated with a Bachelor of Philosophy (Ph.B) degree in 1875. After studying law, Holman was admitted in 1879 to the Oregon bar.

== Career ==
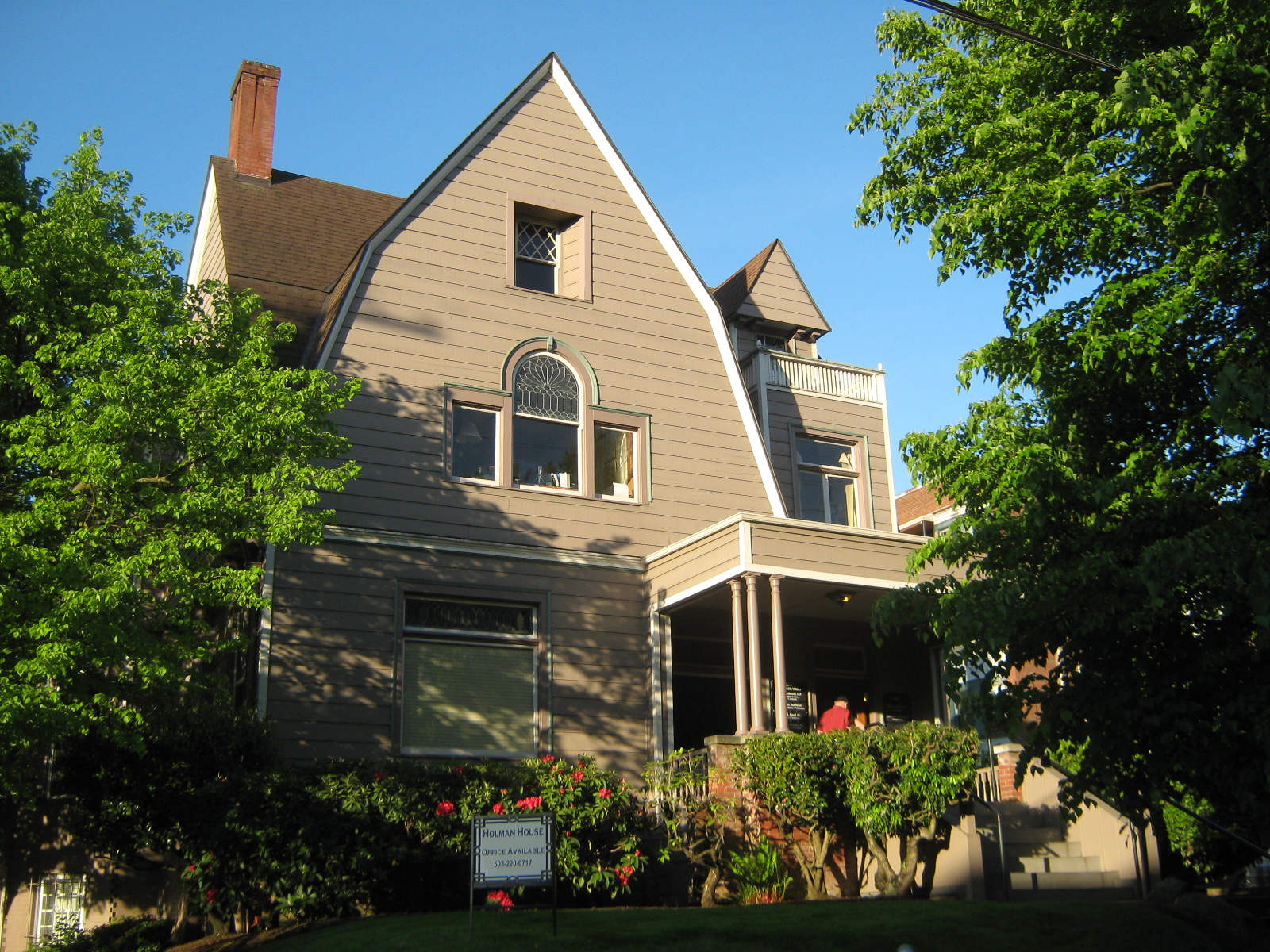
The Frederick V. Holman House in Portland

Holman, who never married, practiced in Portland, where he specialized in corporate, real property, and probate law and became general counsel for the Portland Railway, Light & Power Company, local general counsel for H. M. Byllesby & Company, and a director of the Oregon Power Company. In addition to his legal work, he was also a writer. Among his published works were the Biography of Dr. John McLoughlin, many articles for the quarterly of the Oregon Historical Society, and many articles on roses, including the pamphlet, "Roses at Portland, Oregon, and How to Grow Them". An organizer of the Portland Rose Society, he has been credited with giving Portland one of its nicknames, "Rose City".

President of the Oregon Historical Society from 1908 to 1927, he was also president of the Oregon Bar Association in 1909–10, and a regent of the University of Oregon from 1903 to 1915. He was a member of the Portland Charter Commission and director of the John McLoughlin Memorial Association. (McLoughlin, chief factor of the Columbia District of the Hudson's Bay Company during the second quarter of the 19th century has sometimes been referred to as "The Father of Oregon"). His political affiliation was with the Democratic Party, and he served as a delegate to the Democratic National Convention in 1892 and 1904 and was an Oregon member of the Democratic National Committee from 1904 to 1908.

His memberships and affiliations included the American Bar Association, the American Historical Association, the Washington Historical Society, the National Rose Society of Great Britain, the National Geographic Society, and the National Municipal League. In addition, he belonged to Portland organizations including the Arlington, University, Waverly Golf, and Portland Commercial clubs.

== Death and legacy ==
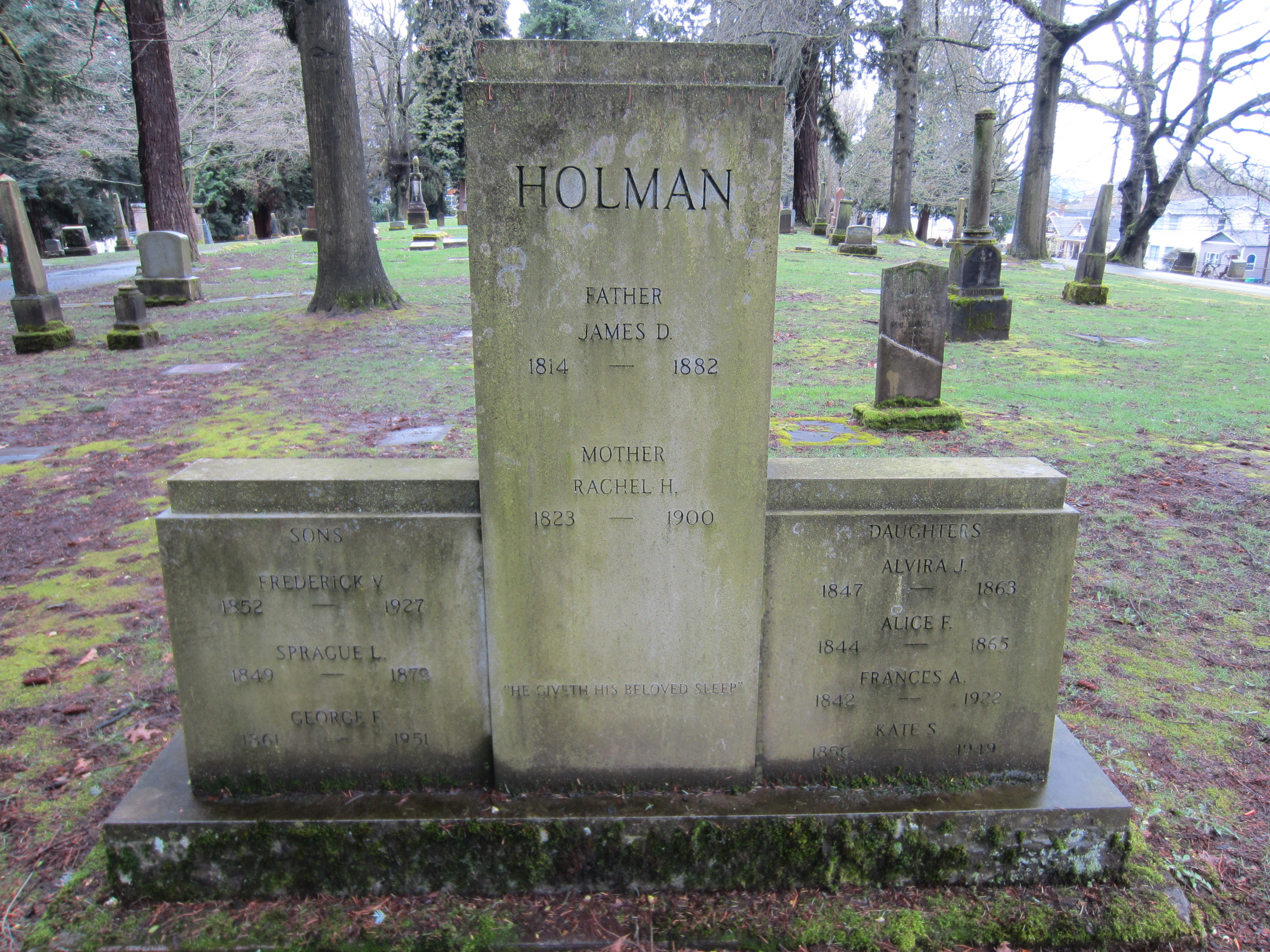
Holman grave at Lone Fir Cemetery

Holman died in 1927 in Portland. He is buried at Lone Fir Cemetery in southeast Portland. Lone Fir is one of several pioneer cemeteries managed by Metro, the regional government of the Oregon part of the Portland metropolitan area.

Holman owned property in the Tualatin Mountains (West Hills) to the northwest of the city center. After the property was damaged by a flume operation in 1909, Holman offered it to the city for a park if it agreed to acquire the land necessary to connect his property to nearby Macleay Park. The transaction was not completed until 12 years after his death. In 1939 his siblings, George F. and Kate Holman, gave the land to the city, and in 1948, Holman Park and several other parks and parcels of land were combined to form Forest Park.

The 1892 Frederick V. Holman House in Portland's Goose Hollow neighborhood was demolished in early October 2016. It was designed by Edgar M. Lazarus.
