= Tryon Creek State Natural Area =

Park and natural area in Portland, Oregon, U.S.

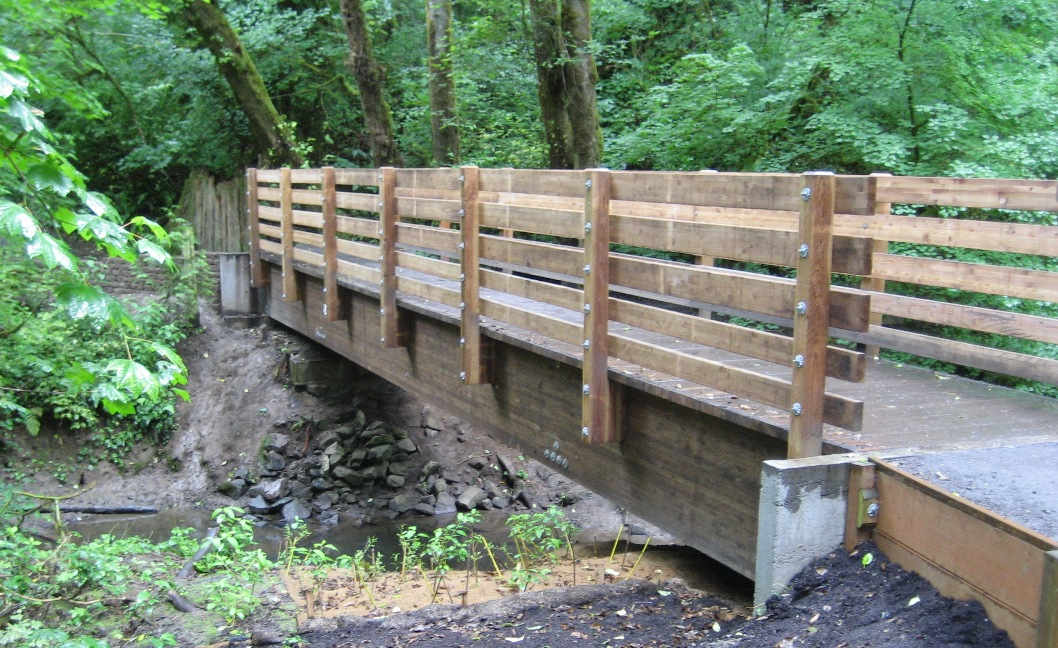
- High Bridge over Tryon Creek, 2007

- Location within Oregon
- Location: Multnomah and Clackamas, Oregon, United States
- Coordinates: 45°26′14″N 122°40′44″W
- Area: 645 acres (261 ha)
- Elevation: 121 ft (37 m)
- Established: 1975
- Named for: Socrates Hotchkiss Tryon, Sr. who settled nearby in about 1850
- Governing body: Oregon Parks and Recreation Department
- Website: Tryon Creek State Natural Area

The Tryon Creek State Natural Area is a state park located primarily in Portland, in the U.S. state of Oregon. It is the only Oregon state park within a major metropolitan area. The 645-acre (261 ha) park lies between Boones Ferry Road and Terwilliger Boulevard in southwest Portland in Multnomah County and northern Lake Oswego in Clackamas County and is bisected from north to south by Tryon Creek. To the north, the park abuts the Lewis & Clark Law School campus.

== Resources ==
The park includes hiking trails, a paved bicycle path, and horse trails. The 3-mile (4.8 km) bicycle path, which runs along Terwilliger Boulevard on the east edge of the park to Lake Oswego, is part of the Portland metropolitan area's system of greenway trails known as the 40-Mile Loop. Near the main entrance off Terwilliger, part of the parking lot is devoted to horse trailers. Riders can choose between the 2-mile (3.2 km) North Horse Loop and the 3-mile (4.8 km) West Horse Loop. Hikers can use the bike path, the horse trails, and 8 miles (13 km) of hiking trails. The paved 0.35-mile (0.56 km) Trillium Trail, a loop furnished with drinking fountains and interpretive signs, can accommodate wheelchairs. Trillium Trail has benches and one viewing deck.

A park building called the Nature Center is near the main park entrance. It has a small play area for toddlers, a gift shop, a large classroom, and a separate area for educational exhibits. Nearby is the Glenn Jackson Shelter, a covered structure for outdoor events.

== History ==
In 1850, Socrates Hotchkiss Tryon Sr., pioneer settler, established a donation land claim at the south end of the canyon. Five years later, he died, leaving the land to his wife, Frances. The land then passed to other relatives, including Socrates Tryon, Jr., who sold the 645 acres (261 ha) in 1874 to the Oregon Iron Company. For nearly 25 years, the company logged virgin cedar and fir to use in its foundry in Lake Oswego. Its logging road later became Old Iron Mountain Trail in the state park. In 1900, fire in the upper canyon left charred snags still visible along the park's Center and Big Fir trails.

Logging resumed in 1912 in the north part of the canyon, where the Boone's Ferry Wood and Tie Company had a site near what became Alfred Street. A sawmill and steam donkey engine operated near what became the sites of Beaver Bridge and Obie's Bridge. The lumber was used chiefly for railroad ties, cordwood and flagpoles, and left huge cedar stumps that remain in the park. Intermittent logging continued through 1961, and a 1962 windstorm known as the Columbus Day Storm of 1962 blew down many remaining trees.

Local efforts began in the 1950s to establish a park along the creek, In 1969, the government of Multnomah County bought 45 acres (18 ha) to start a large regional park and sought citizen assistance with the project. This led to formation of Friends of Tryon Creek Park, which raised private funds for the park, helped arrange land deals, helped solve problems of jurisdiction in a two-county, two-city park, and sought help from the state. In 1970, Oregon Governor Tom McCall announced the formation of Tryon Creek State Park.

Over the next few years, the state bought more than 600 acres (240 ha) of land for nearly $3 million, including federal matching funds. The Friends and the state collaborated in park planning and further fund-raising. In 1973, more than 300 volunteers built trails, and the nature center and shelter were finished by 1975. The park was officially dedicated on July 1, 1975.

== Vegetation and wildlife ==
Dominant plants in the Tryon Creek watershed are red alder, bigleaf maple, Douglas-fir, Western redcedar, and Western hemlock. The forest understory in the park includes many trilliums, celebrated each spring during the park's Trillium Festival. More than 90 species of wildflower such as fringecup are found in the park as well as plants such as sword fern.

More than 50 species of birds as well as small mammals such as beaver inhabit the park. Tryon Creek is among the few streams in the Portland metropolitan area with a run of steelhead trout, and coho salmon have been recorded spawning in the creek. Water striders are common in the pools of Tryon Creek.

== See also ==
- Arnold–Park Log Home
- List of Oregon state parks
