= Duniway Park =

Public park in Portland, Oregon, U.S.

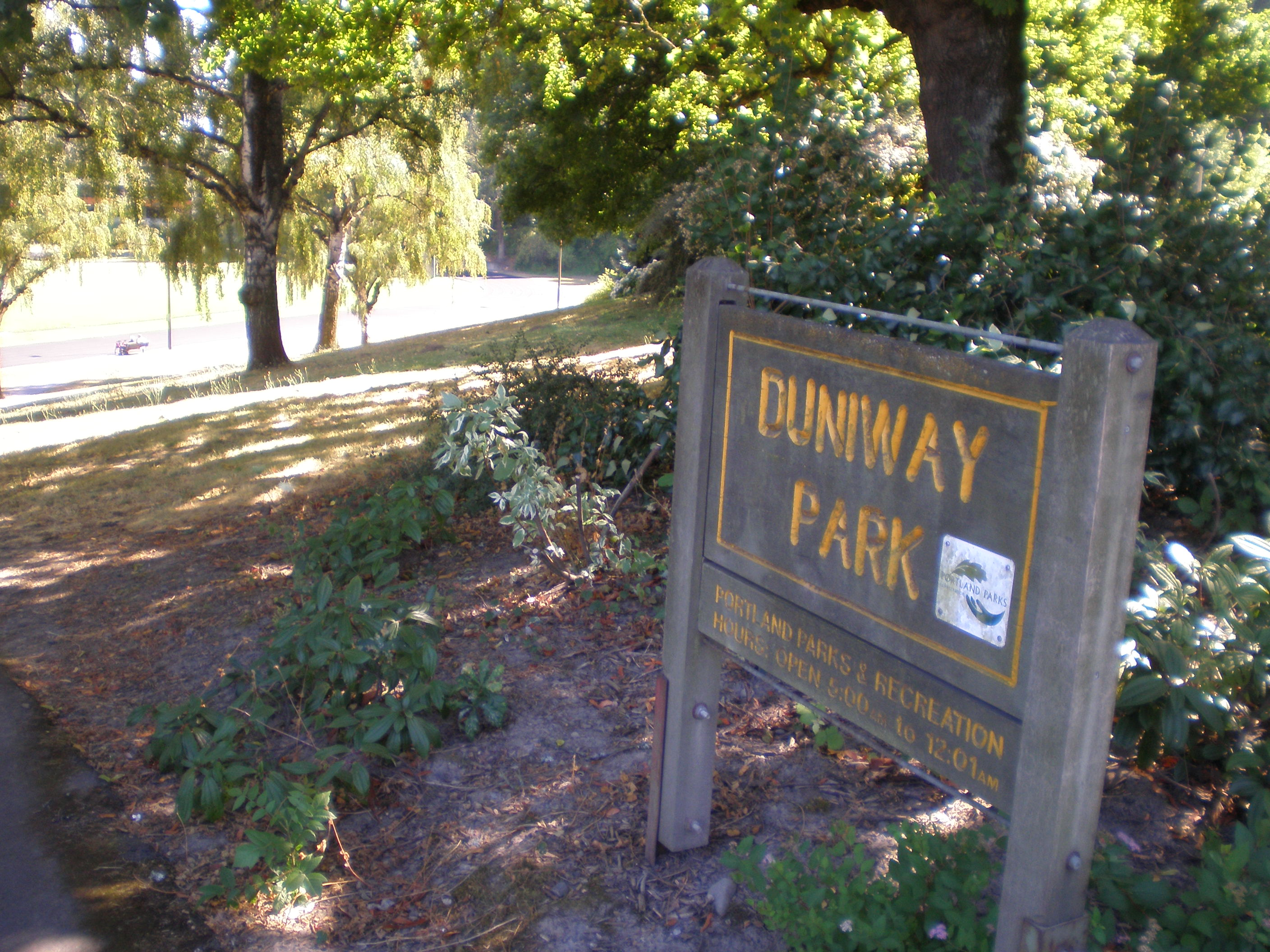
- Sign for the park
- Interactive map of Duniway Park
- Location: SW 6th Ave. and Sheridan St. Portland, Oregon
- Coordinates: 45°30′13″N 122°41′2″W
- Area: 14.03 acres (5.68 ha)
- Operator: Portland Parks & Recreation

Duniway Park is a 14.03-acre (5.68 ha) public park in southwest Portland, Oregon. The space was acquired in 1918.
