= John F. Kennedy High School (Oregon) =

Public school in Mt. Angel, Oregon, U.S.

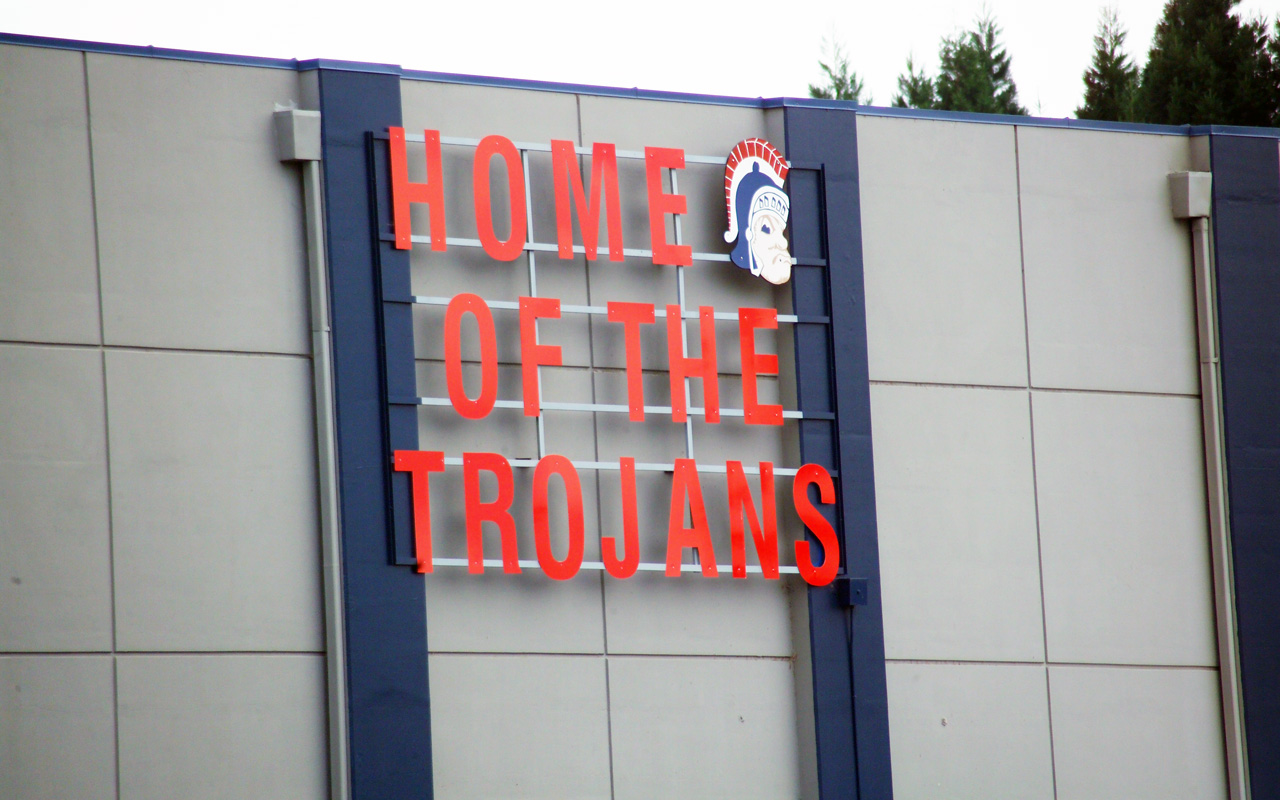

Location
- 890 East Marquam Street; Mt. Angel, (Marion County), Oregon 97362; United States; 45.071875°N 122.789501°W

Information
- Type: Public
- Motto: To ensure pathways of growth and achievement for all students through responsive adult actions
- School district: Mt. Angel School District
- Principal: Jessica Brenden
- Teaching staff: 12.89 (FTE)
- Grades: 9–12
- Enrollment: 223 (2024-2025)
- Student to teacher ratio: 17.30
- Colors: Red, White, and Blue
- Athletics conference: OSAA 2A-2 Tri-River Conference
- Mascot: Trojan
- Team name: Trojans
- Rival: Colton High School (Oregon)
- Website: jfkhs.masd91.org

John F. Kennedy High School is a public school located in Mt. Angel, Oregon, United States.

== History ==
The school was originally Mt. Angel Preparatory School run by the Benedictine monks of Mount Angel Abbey, and was founded in 1887.

The Benedictines ran the school until 1964, when they turned its administration over to St. Mary's Catholic Church, located in Mt. Angel. The parish ran the school for five years until closing it in 1969. It was reopened one year later as John F. Kennedy High School, and remains so today.

== Academics ==
In 2014, 79% of the school's seniors received a high school diploma. Kennedy currently offers five Advanced Placement (AP) courses. The school also began the AVID program at the beginning of the 2015–16 school year.

In 2022, 82% of the school's seniors received a high school diploma. Of 39 students, 33 graduated and 6 dropped out.

== Athletics ==
Kennedy High School athletic teams compete in the OSAA 2A-2 Tri-River Conference (excluding Football which competes in 3A-SD1). The athletic director is Kevin Moffatt.

State Championships:

- Baseball: 2012, 2022, 2023
- Football: 2018
- Girls Basketball: 2016, 2018, 2020
- Girls Track and Field: 1985, 2014
- Softball: 2018
- Volleyball: 2019
