= Middle Grove =

Middle Grove or Middlegrove may refer to the following places in the United States:

- Middlegrove, Illinois
- Middle Grove, Missouri
- Middle Grove, New York
- Middle Grove, Oregon
