= Mt. Angel maypole =

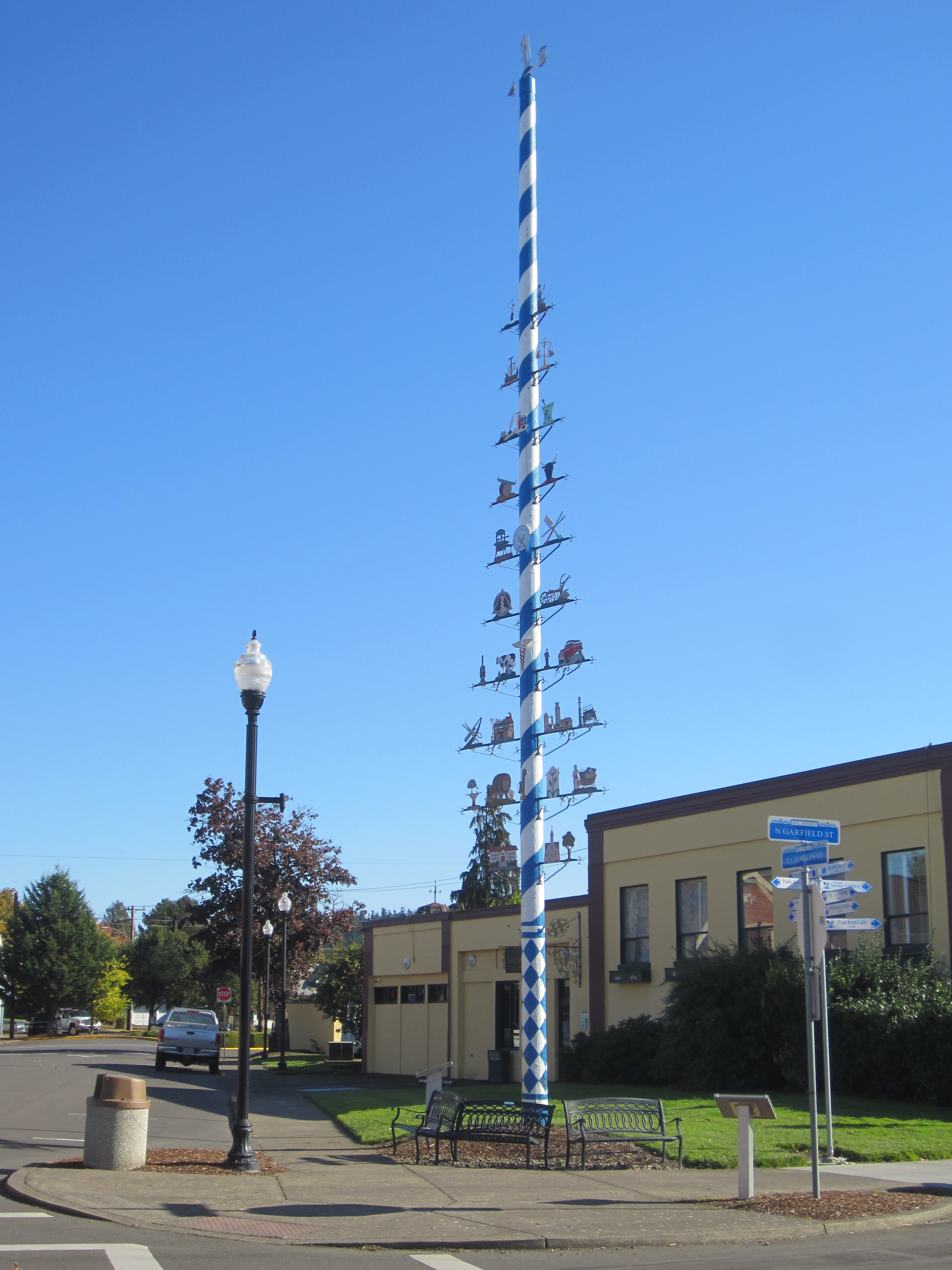
- The maypole in 2020
- Location: Mt. Angel, Oregon, U.S.; 45°04′04.4″N 122°47′54.3″W

The maypole in Mt. Angel, Oregon, also known as der maibaum ("the maypole" in German), is a landmark depicting local services and skills.

== Description ==
The "tree of trades" depicts the "businesses, services and skills" of locals. The lowest two branches show a church and school, the "spiritual and intellectual foundations". One of the top branches depicts a golfer. The pole has a spiral painted in blue and white, the "colors of Bavaria". The top of the pole has an "Engelberg" Angel weather vane (Mount Angel Abbey was founded by monks from Engelberg, Switzerland).

A planning and design document for the proposed Mt. Angel Bavarian District suggested the maypole could be "designed so that the business figures rotate in the wind generating power and adding to the visual interest of the pole".

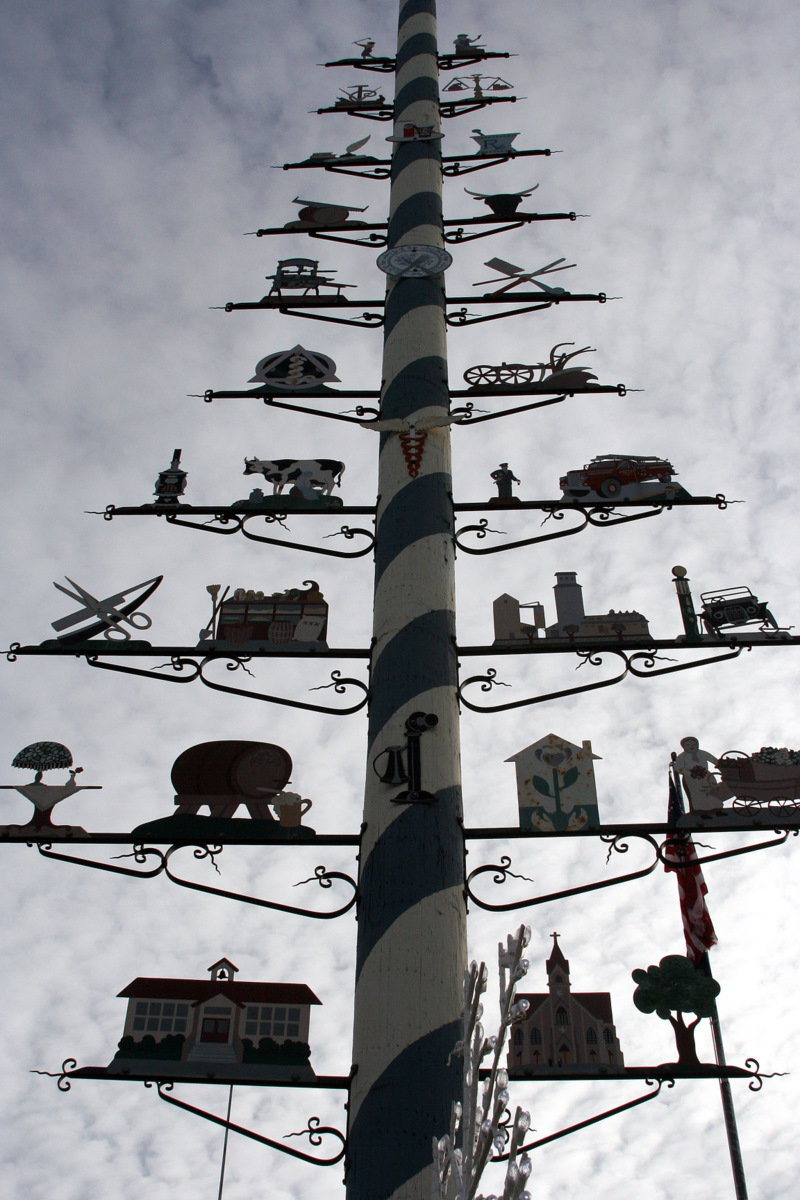
Detail of the maypole, which depicts local services and skills, in 2010
