= Oktoberfest Joy =

Fountain in Mt. Angel, Oregon, U.S.

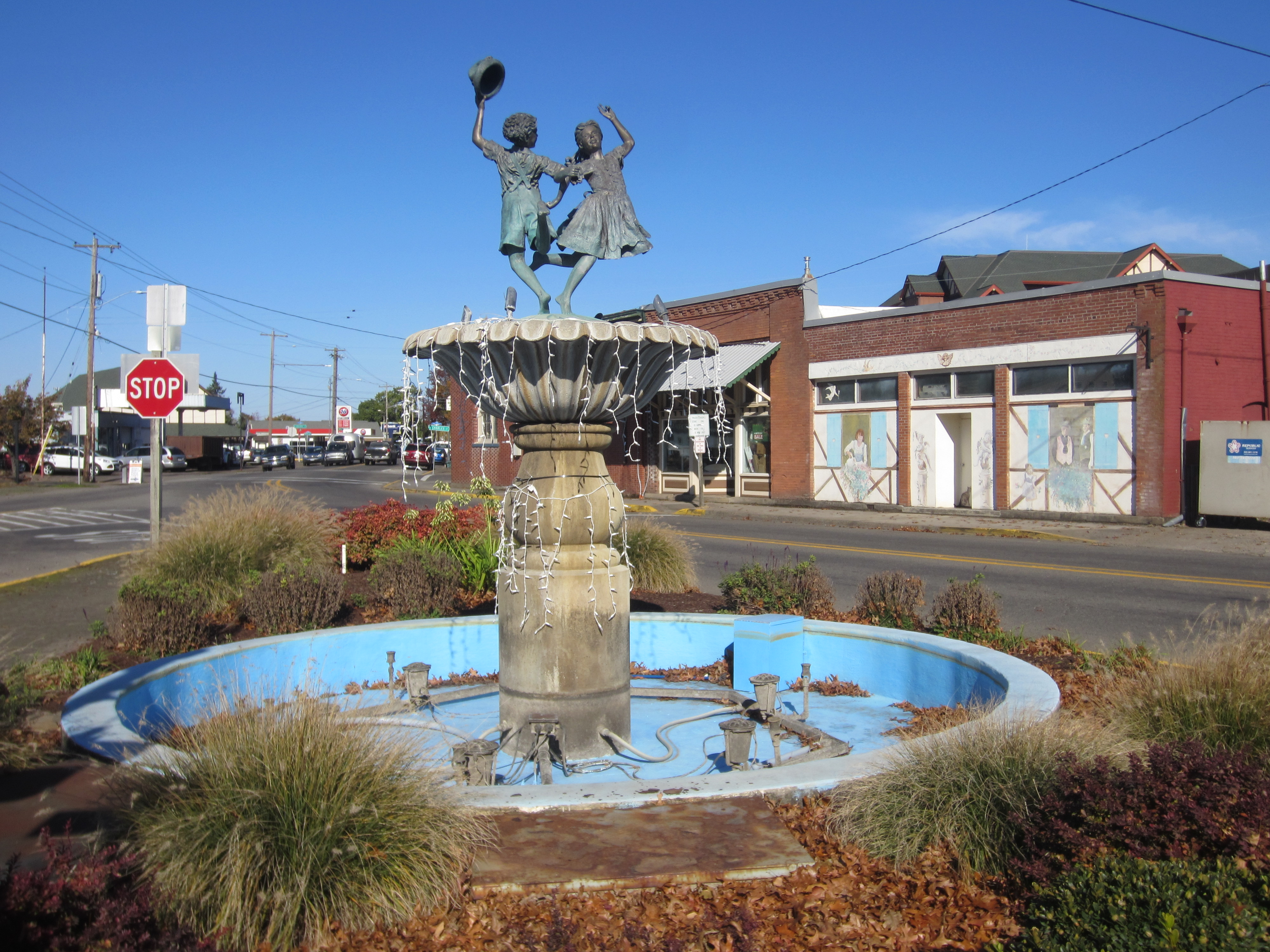
- The fountain in 2020
- Artist: Jerry Joslin
- Location: Mt. Angel, Oregon, U.S.
- 45°4′3.80″N 122°47′58.88″W

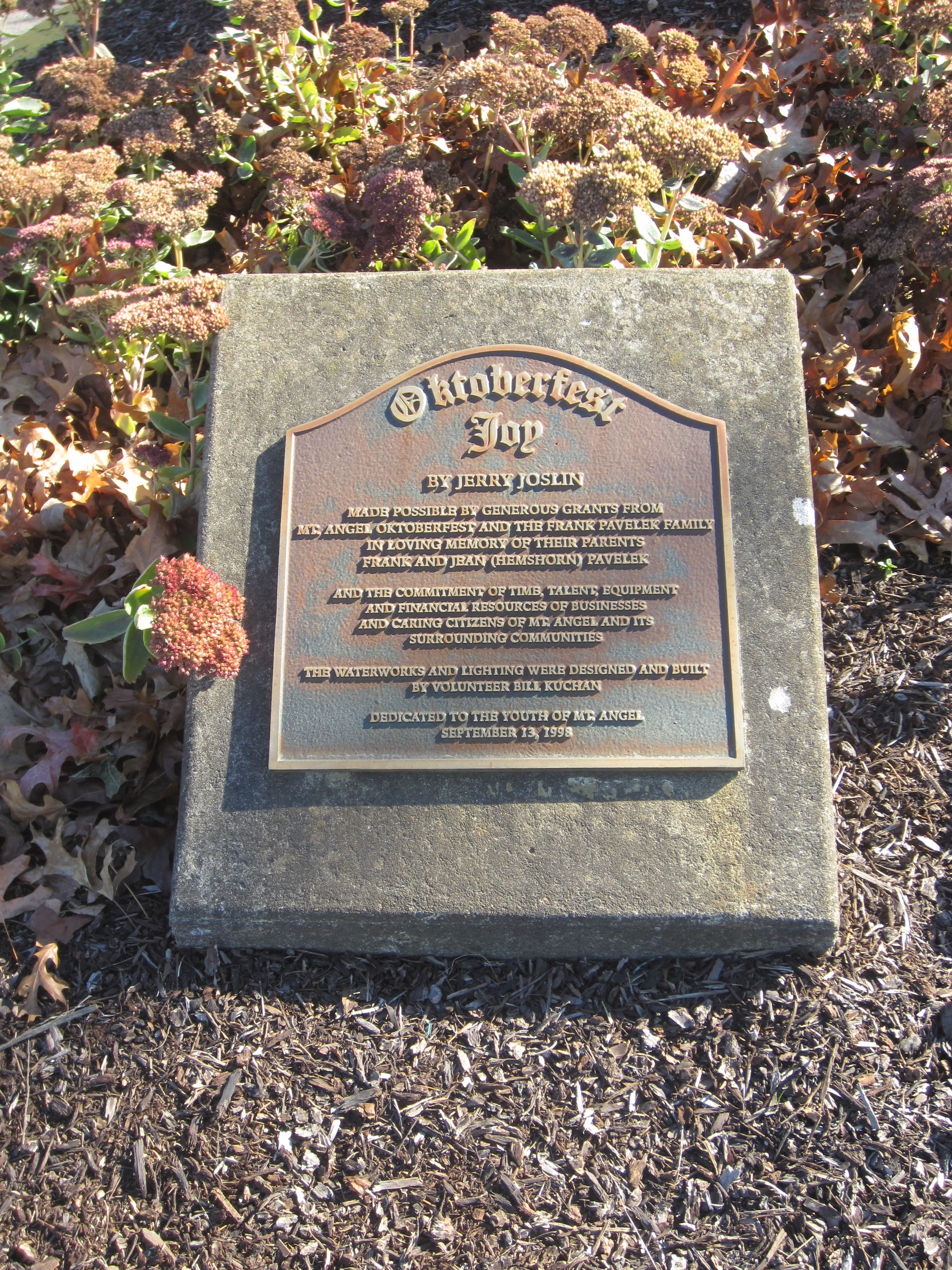
Plaque for the fountain

Oktoberfest Joy is a fountain and sculpture by Jerry Joslin, installed in Mt. Angel, Oregon, United States.

== Description and history ==
The fountain depicts two dancing children; the statues were acquired by the Mt. Angel Chamber of Commerce, which also maintains the fountain and surrounding flower beds. A planning and design document for the proposed Mt. Angel Bavarian District describes the fountain as a "key transportation landmark" and recommended converting the fountain to solar power. In 2018, the Roth Family Foundation granted $10,000 to the city for a 26x18-foot mural by David McDonald depicting Mt. Angel's "iconic" landmarks. The "German inspired" mural shows dancers wearing lederhosen and "ringing" the Oktoberfest Joy fountain.
