= Little Pudding River =

- Location of the mouth of the Little Pudding River in Oregon

Location
- Country: United States
- State: Oregon
- County: Marion

Physical characteristics
- Source: Waldo Hills
  - location: near Macleay
  - coordinates: 44°52′54″N 122°53′26″W
  - elevation: 462 ft (141 m)
- Mouth: Pudding River
  - location: near Mount Angel
  - coordinates: 45°04′25″N 122°51′13″W
  - elevation: 131 ft (40 m)

The Little Pudding River is a tributary of the Pudding River in Marion County in the U.S. state of Oregon. It begins in the Waldo Hills near Macleay, east of Salem, and flows generally north to meet the larger river west of Mt. Angel. The confluence is about 37 miles (60 km) from the Pudding River's mouth on the Molalla River.

== Course ==
The river flows northwest from near Macleay under State Street, Conifer Street Northeast, and Sunnyview Road before turning north, then northwest again and flowing under Oregon Route 213. Shortly thereafter, it receives West Fork from the left. Downstream of this, as it flows by Hazel Green, Howell Prairie is on its right, and Lake Labish is on its left. Turning northeast, the river receives Woods Creek from the right as well as Lake Labish Ditch and Carnes Creek from the left before passing under Howell Creek Road near Parkerville Dam and entering the Pudding River.

== Floods ==
Lake Labish Ditch was created in the late 19th century to drain historic Lake Labish in order to use the lakebed for farming. Before 1950, floods on the Pudding River sometimes flowed backwards up the Little Pudding River and into the valley around the ditch. In the 1950s, the Natural Resources Conservation Service built Parkerville Dam and pump station on the lower Little Pudding to prevent backflow flooding. Even so, water accumulating behind the dam flooded 15 homes in Keizer in 1996.

== See also ==
- List of rivers of Oregon
