= Pratum =

"Pratum" is a Latin word meaning "meadow". Pratum may refer to:

- Pratum, Oregon, an unincorporated community in Marion County, Oregon
- Pratum Chuthong (born 1983), a Thai professional footballer
- Pratum Musicum, a 1584 collection of lute music for solo and ensemble by Emmanuel Adriaenssen
- Pratum spirituale, one of several names of one of the earliest hagiological works by John Moschus (c. 550 – 619)
- Pratum spirituale, c. 1620, a Danish church music composition by Mogens Pedersøn
