= Monitor, Oregon =

Unincorporated community in the state of Oregon, United States

- Unincorporated community
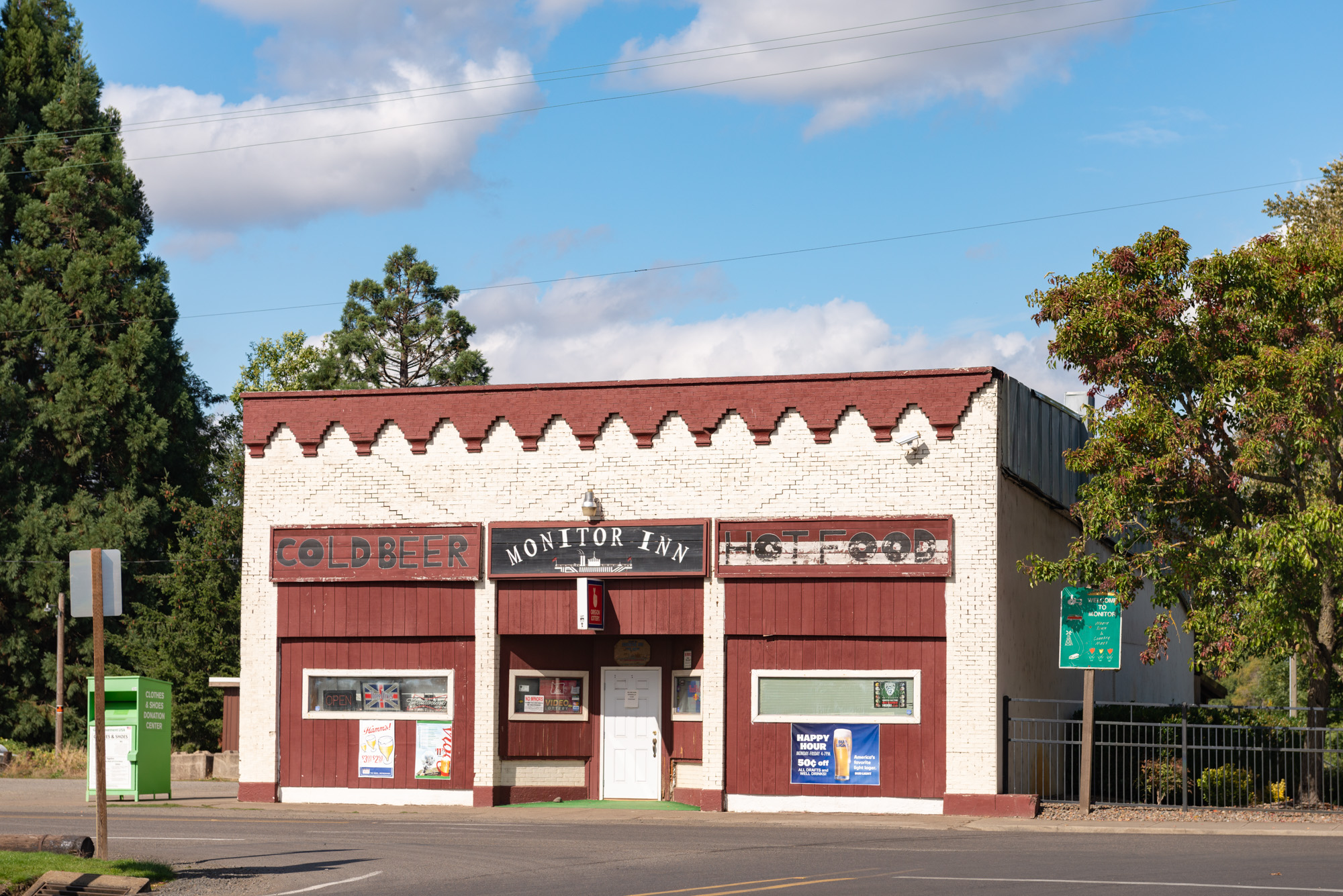
- The Monitor Inn in Monitor, Oregon.

- Location within Oregon Location within the United States
- Coordinates: 45°06′06″N 122°45′02″W
- Country: United States
- State: Oregon
- County: Marion
- Elevation: 177 ft (54 m)
- Time zone: UTC-8 (Pacific (PST))
  - Summer (DST): UTC-7 (PDT)
- ZIP codes: 97071 and 97362
- Area codes: 503 and 971
- GNIS feature ID: 1163155

Monitor, Oregon is an unincorporated community in Marion County, Oregon, United States It is about 3 miles (5 km) northeast of the city of Mt. Angel, on Butte Creek in the Willamette Valley. It is part of the Salem Metropolitan Statistical Area.

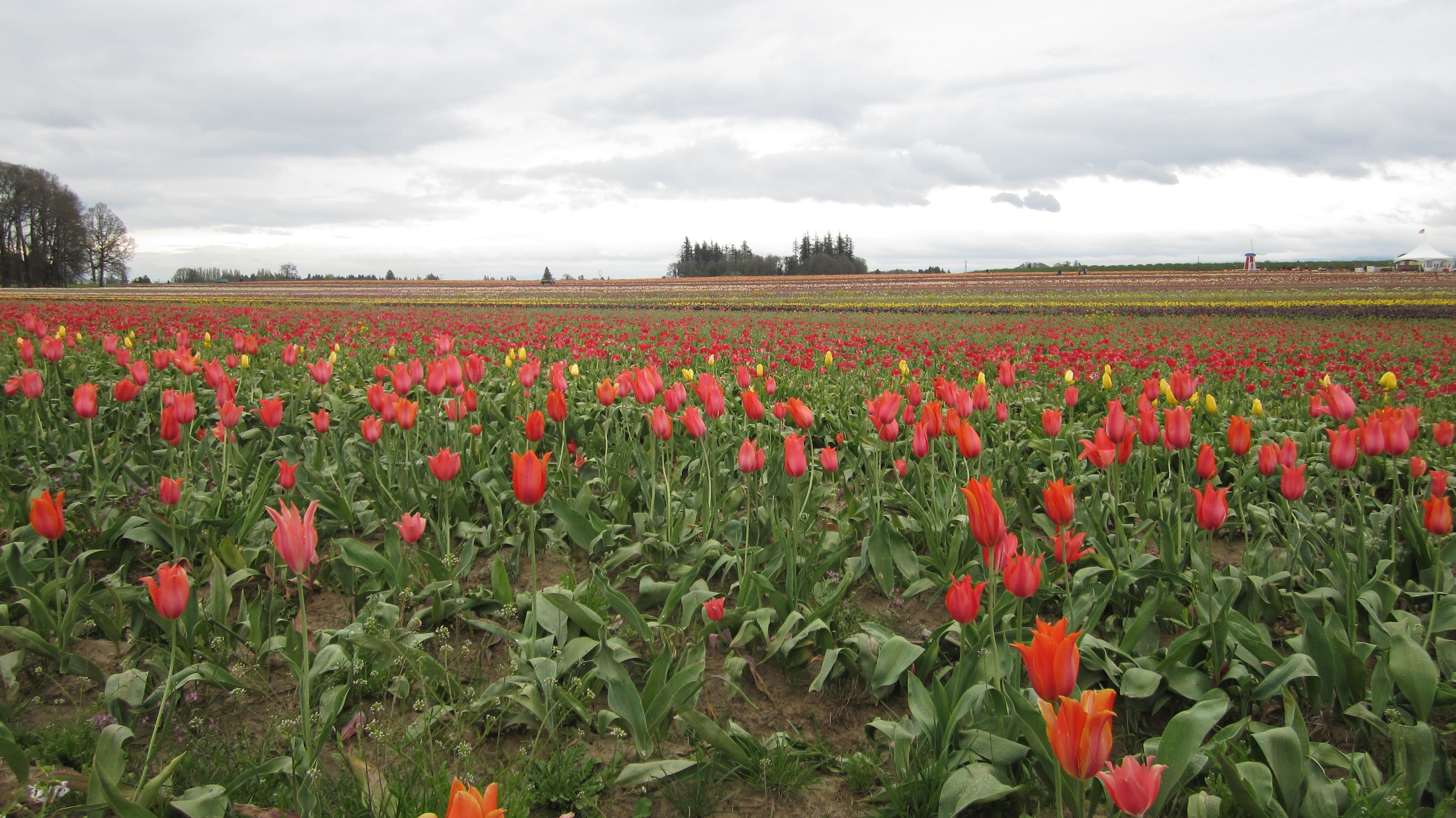
Tulips at the annual Wooden Shoe Tulip Festival, held at the Wooden Shoe Tulip Farm in Monitor, Oregon

Oregon Geographic Names (OGN) states that a local story about the possible origin of the name "Monitor" is that it is derived from a type of flour mill, the Monitor mill, in use in the early days of the community. In 1990, however, a descendant of one of the owners of the mill told OGN's compiler that the mill was named after the Civil War ironclad warship the USS Monitor. Furthermore, the community of Monitor did not exist until 1869, when the post office was established, and this was apparently the first use of the name for the locality. Thus, it is more likely the community was named after the ship.

Monitor is surrounded by farmland. Each spring, a tulip festival is held at the Wooden Shoe Tulip Farm about one mile north of the town center, across Butte Creek in Clackamas County.

Monitor shares its ZIP codes with the nearby cities of Woodburn (97071) and Mt. Angel (97362).
