= West Stayton, Oregon =

Unincorporated community in Oregon, United States

- Unincorporated community
- Location within Oregon Location within the United States
- Coordinates: 44°47′11″N 122°52′00″W
- Country: United States
- State: Oregon
- County: Marion
- Elevation: 387 ft (118 m)
- Time zone: UTC-8 (Pacific (PST))
  - Summer (DST): UTC-7 (PDT)
- ZIP codes: 97325
- Area codes: 503 and 971
- GNIS feature ID: 1128899

West Stayton is an unincorporated community in Marion County, Oregon, United States. It is located four miles west of Stayton, and five miles south of Aumsville. The ZIP Code is 97325. It is part of the Salem Metropolitan Statistical Area.

Similar to nearby communities in the Willamette Valley, West Stayton is primarily an agricultural area. It is noted for innovations in irrigation. The Stayton Power Canal diverts water from the North Santiam River, located south of West Stayton, to farms in the area.

== History ==
The West Stayton railroad station was established in the 1880s, on the Oregonian Railway; the station was named West Stayton because it was the nearest train station to Stayton, and is located to the west of the town.

In the late 1880s, residents petitioned to have a post office established, but were refused by the U.S. Postal Service because they were concerned that the name may be too confusing. In 1946, the residents of West Stayton gathered to discuss the possibility of choosing a different name for the post office. Ultimately, the name "Ale" was chosen, and the Ale post office was established on December 18, 1888. Levi J. Hollister was the postmaster. It closed in July 1890, then reopened on January 12, 1891, with Henry B. Condit as the new postmaster. The post office closed again on September 3, 1902, when the Aumsville post office began offering rural free delivery to the West Stayton area. The Ale post office was re-established once more on October 11, 1911; D. M. McInnis was the postmaster. On August 1, 1953, the Ale post office became a rural station served from Aumsville.

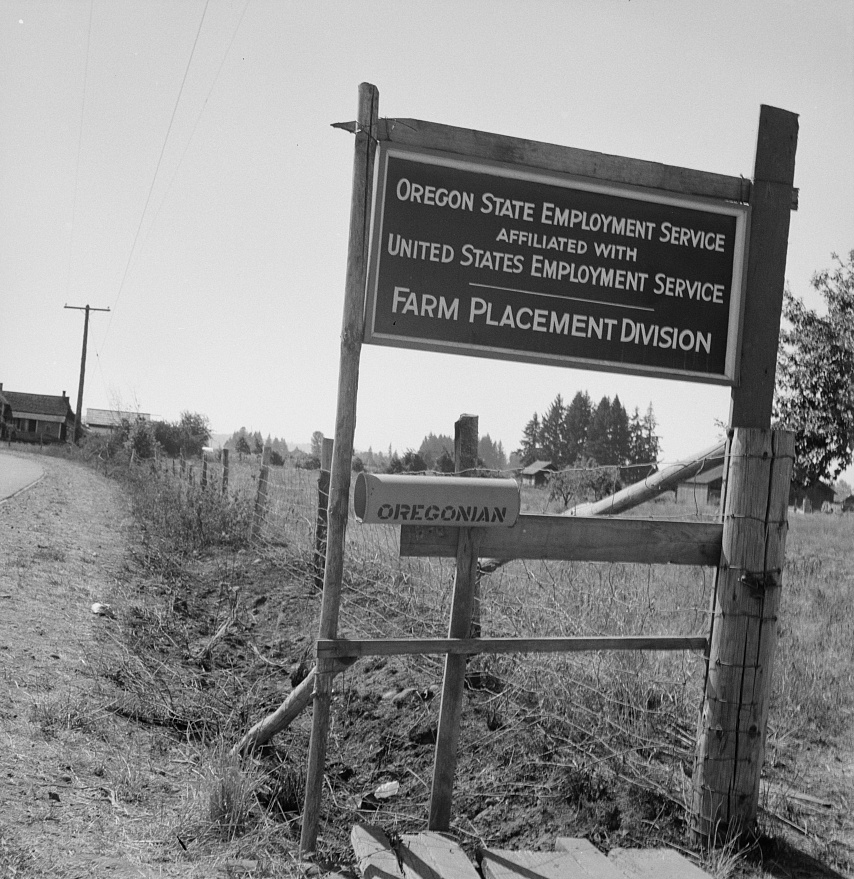
Oregon State Employment Service field office sign in West Stayton, 1939

During the 1930s and 1940s, people moved west to find work amid the Great Depression and Dust Bowl. Some of them became seasonal migrant workers, moving between various farm areas throughout the year. West Stayton was one place where migrant workers would stay in tents and pick crops–mostly beans–during the summer. During this period, West Stayton hosted to a seasonal office for the Farm Services division of Oregon's branch of the United States Employment Service. Although the bean crops have largely been replaced with corn, grass seed, or other crops, there is still a road in West Stayton named "Bean Alley" after the industry.

In March 1960, an F1 tornado touched down in West Stayton. It caused some property damage, but there were no recorded deaths.

== Notable people ==
- Jacob DeShazer (1912–2008), American Christian missionary involved in Doolittle's Raid

== See also ==
- Agriculture in Oregon
- List of cities and unincorporated communities in Oregon
- Salem, Oregon
