= North Howell, Oregon =

Unincorporated community in the state of Oregon, United States

- Unincorporated community
- Location within Oregon Location within the United States
- Coordinates: 45°01′52″N 122°52′24″W
- Country: United States
- State: Oregon
- County: Marion
- Elevation: 207 ft (63 m)
- Time zone: UTC-8 (Pacific (PST))
  - Summer (DST): UTC-7 (PDT)
- ZIP code: 97381
- Area codes: 503 and 971
- GNIS feature ID: 1124825

North Howell is an unincorporated community in Marion County, Oregon, United States. It is located on Howell Prairie. North Howell Elementary School, part of the Gervais School District, closed in 2002. Since the school closure, many area students attend Silverton schools as well as those in Gervais. Beginning in 2009, North Howell school has been leased to St. John Bosco High School, a private Catholic high school.
