= Mt. Angel Glockenspiel =

Mt. Angel glockenspiel
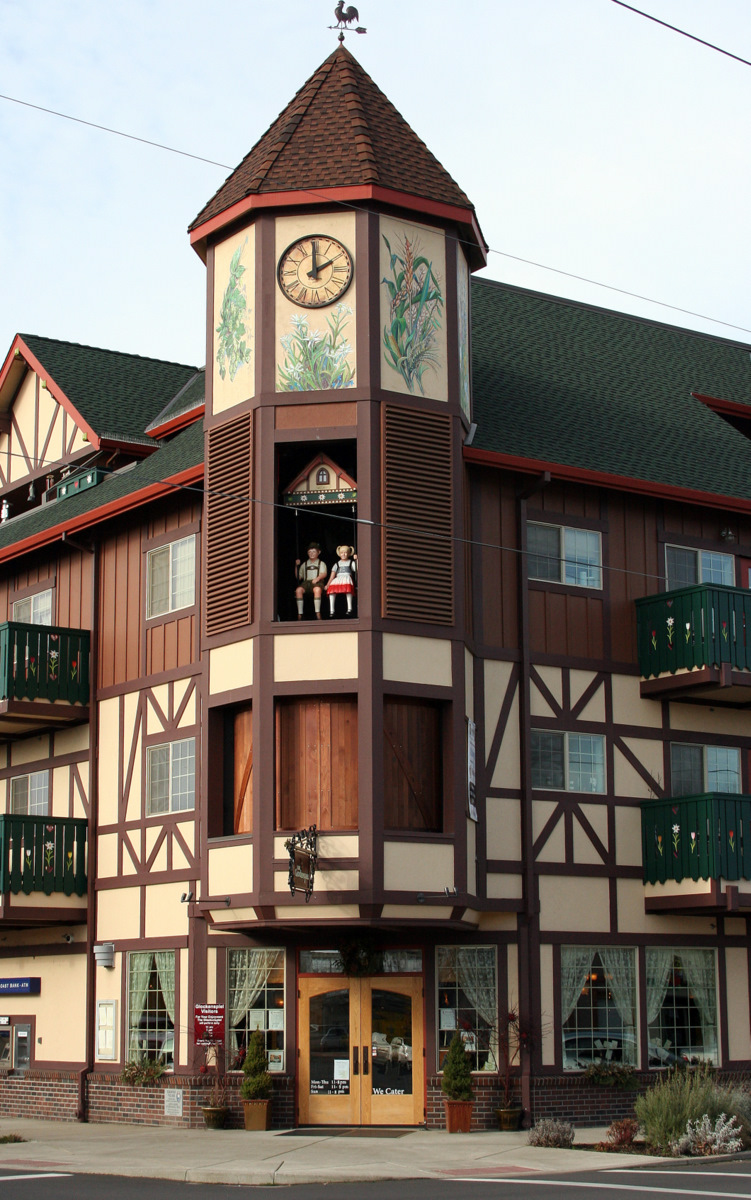
- The glockenspiel in 2010
- Location: Mt. Angel, Oregon, U.S.; 45°04′05.3″N 122°47′55.2″W

A glockenspiel is installed at 190 E. Charles Street in Mt. Angel, Oregon, United States. The glockenspiel is housed in a 49-foot (15 m) tower and features wood carvings of community members. A musical routine occurs four times daily.

In 2016, figurines representing the six military branches replaced the regular statues temporarily.
