= Hayesville, Oregon =

Unincorporated community in the state of Oregon, United States

- Census-designated place
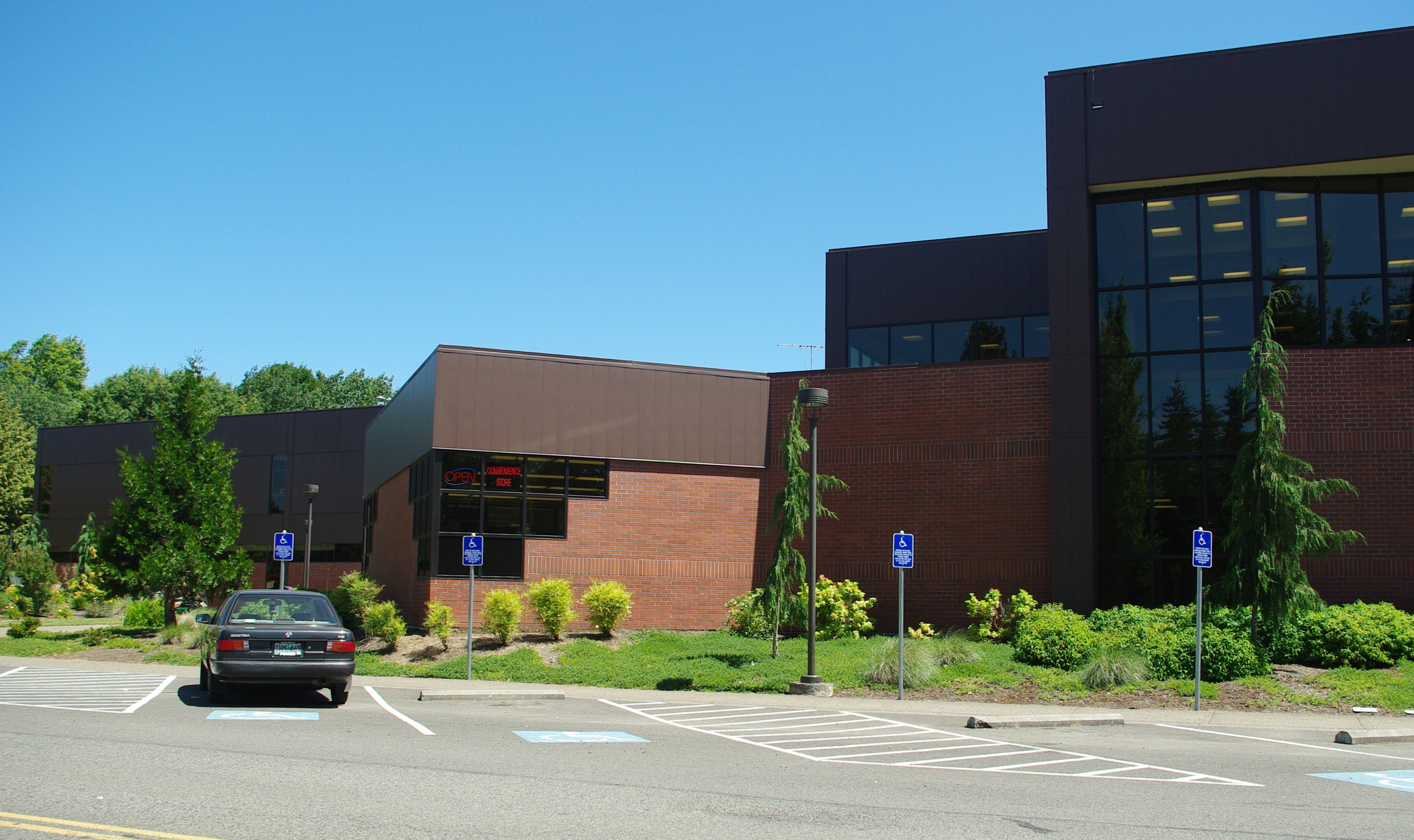
- Chemeketa Community College

- Location in Marion County and the state of Oregon
- Coordinates: 44°58′45″N 122°58′26″W
- Country: United States
- State: Oregon
- County: Marion

Area
  - Total: 2.99 sq mi (7.7 km^{2})
  - Land: 2.99 sq mi (7.7 km^{2})
  - Water: 0.00 sq mi (0 km^{2})
- Elevation: 187 ft (57 m)

Population (2020)
  - Total: 21,891
  - Density: 7,248.7/sq mi (2,798.74/km^{2})
- Time zone: UTC-8 (Pacific (PST))
  - Summer (DST): UTC-7 (PDT)
- ZIP Code: 97305 (Salem)
- Area codes: 503 and 971
- FIPS code: 41-32850
- GNIS feature ID: 2408360

Hayesville is a census-designated place and unincorporated community in Marion County, Oregon, United States, just outside the city limits of Salem but within the city's urban growth boundary. It is part of the Salem Metropolitan Statistical Area. The population of the CDP was 21,891 at the 2020 census.

Hayesville is the home of Chemeketa Community College's main campus.

== Geography ==
Hayesville is on the northeast side of Salem and is nearly surrounded by it, being bordered to the north, west, south, and partially to the east by the larger city. Downtown Salem is 5 miles (8 km) to the southwest. Interstate 5 forms part of the western boundary of the CDP, and Oregon Route 99E runs through the northwestern part of the community, leading northeast 13 miles (21 km) to Woodburn. Oregon Route 213 crosses the southern part of Hayesville, leading east 10 miles (16 km) to Silverton.

According to the U.S. Census Bureau, the Hayesville CDP has a total area of 3.0 square miles (7.8 km^{2}), all land. Claggett Creek, a tributary of the Willamette River, flows out of the community to the west, while the West Fork of the Little Pudding River runs out of the community to the east.

== Demographics ==
Historical population
Census	Pop.	Note	%±
1950	2,697		—
1960	4,568		69.4%
1970	5,518		20.8%
1980	9,213		67.0%
1990	14,318		55.4%
2000	18,222		27.3%
2010	19,936		9.4%
2020	21,891		9.8%
U.S. Decennial Census

=== 2020 census ===
As of the 2020 census, Hayesville had a population of 21,891. The median age was 32.6 years. 27.3% of residents were under the age of 18 and 12.9% of residents were 65 years of age or older. For every 100 females there were 101.1 males, and for every 100 females age 18 and over there were 98.3 males age 18 and over.

100.0% of residents lived in urban areas, while 0.0% lived in rural areas.

There were 7,349 households in Hayesville, of which 37.3% had children under the age of 18 living in them. Of all households, 44.0% were married-couple households, 19.8% were households with a male householder and no spouse or partner present, and 26.0% were households with a female householder and no spouse or partner present. About 21.4% of all households were made up of individuals and 8.7% had someone living alone who was 65 years of age or older.

There were 7,567 housing units, of which 2.9% were vacant. The homeowner vacancy rate was 1.0% and the rental vacancy rate was 3.4%.

Racial composition as of the 2020 census
Race	Number	Percent
White	11,057	50.5%
Black or African American	295	1.3%
American Indian and Alaska Native	534	2.4%
Asian	555	2.5%
Native Hawaiian and Other Pacific Islander	637	2.9%
Some other race	5,649	25.8%
Two or more races	3,164	14.5%
Hispanic or Latino (of any race)	10,143	46.3%

=== 2000 census ===
As of the 2000 United States census, there were 18,222 people, 6,655 households, and 4,631 families residing in the CDP. The population density was 4,635.7 inhabitants per square mile (1,789.9/km^{2}). There were 6,951 housing units at an average density of 1,768.3 per square mile (682.7/km^{2}). The racial makeup of the CDP was 76.81% White, 0.95% African American, 1.72% Native American, 3.50% Asian, 0.71% Pacific Islander, 12.50% from other races, and 3.81% from two or more races. Hispanic or Latino of any race were 19.76% of the population.

There were 6,655 households, out of which 35.6% had children under the age of 18 living with them, 51.9% were married couples living together, 12.5% had a female householder with no husband present, and 30.4% were non-families. 21.7% of all households were made up of individuals, and 6.4% had someone living alone who was 65 years of age or older. The average household size was 2.71 and the average family size was 3.15.

In the CDP, the population was spread out, with 27.7% under the age of 18, 12.4% from 18 to 24, 28.3% from 25 to 44, 21.3% from 45 to 64, and 10.3% who were 65 years of age or older. The median age was 31 years. For every 100 females, there were 100.4 males. For every 100 females age 18 and over, there were 96.5 males.

The median income for a household in the CDP was $35,673, and the median income for a family was $40,781. Males had a median income of $33,920 versus $26,969 for females. The per capita income for the CDP was $17,673. About 12.8% of families and 15.3% of the population were below the poverty line, including 20.5% of those under age 18 and 7.2% of those age 65 or over.
