= Four Corners, Oregon =

Unincorporated community in the state of Oregon, United States

- Census-designated place
- Location in Marion County and the state of Oregon
- Coordinates: 44°55′45″N 122°58′23″W
- Country: United States
- State: Oregon
- County: Marion

Area
  - Total: 2.44 sq mi (6.3 km^{2})
  - Land: 2.44 sq mi (6.3 km^{2})
  - Water: 0.00 sq mi (0 km^{2})
- Elevation: 223 ft (68 m)

Population (2020)
  - Total: 16,740
  - Density: 6,844.4/sq mi (2,642.64/km^{2})
- Time zone: UTC-8 (Pacific (PST))
  - Summer (DST): UTC-7 (PDT)
- ZIP Codes: 97301, 97317 (Salem)
- FIPS code: 41-26750
- GNIS feature ID: 2408248

Four Corners is an unincorporated area and census-designated place (CDP) in Marion County, Oregon, United States, just outside the city limits of Salem but within the city's urban growth boundary. It is part of the Salem Metropolitan Statistical Area. The population of the CDP was 16,740 at the 2020 census. It is named after the intersection of State Street and Lancaster Drive at the center of the community.

== Geography ==
Four Corners is on the east side of Salem and nearly surrounded by it, bordered by the larger city to the north, west, and south. Interstate 5 runs along part of the western border of the community, and Oregon Route 22 runs just south of it, with access from the exit for Lancaster Driver SE.

According to the U.S. Census Bureau, the Four Corners CDP has a total area of 2.4 square miles (6.2 km^{2}), all land.

=== Climate ===
This region experiences warm (but not hot) and dry summers, with no average monthly temperatures above 71.6 °F (22.0 °C). According to the Köppen Climate Classification system, Four Corners has a warm-summer Mediterranean climate, abbreviated "Csb" on climate maps.

== Demographics ==
Historical population
Census	Pop.	Note	%±
1950	1,284		—
1960	4,743		269.4%
1970	5,823		22.8%
1980	11,331		94.6%
1990	12,156		7.3%
2000	13,922		14.5%
2010	15,947		14.5%
2020	16,740		5.0%
U.S. Decennial Census

=== 2020 census ===
As of the 2020 census, Four Corners had a population of 16,740. The median age was 34.6 years. 26.1% of residents were under the age of 18 and 14.5% of residents were 65 years of age or older. For every 100 females there were 96.5 males, and for every 100 females age 18 and over there were 93.6 males age 18 and over.

100.0% of residents lived in urban areas, while 0.0% lived in rural areas.

There were 5,704 households in Four Corners, of which 34.9% had children under the age of 18 living in them. Of all households, 44.6% were married-couple households, 17.8% were households with a male householder and no spouse or partner present, and 28.2% were households with a female householder and no spouse or partner present. About 22.4% of all households were made up of individuals and 12.1% had someone living alone who was 65 years of age or older.

There were 5,882 housing units, of which 3.0% were vacant. The homeowner vacancy rate was 1.3% and the rental vacancy rate was 3.2%.

Racial composition as of the 2020 census
Race	Number	Percent
White	9,537	57.0%
Black or African American	212	1.3%
American Indian and Alaska Native	388	2.3%
Asian	283	1.7%
Native Hawaiian and Other Pacific Islander	353	2.1%
Some other race	3,802	22.7%
Two or more races	2,165	12.9%
Hispanic or Latino (of any race)	6,783	40.5%

=== 2000 census ===
As of the 2000 census, there were 13,922 people, 5,088 households, and 3,475 families residing in the CDP. The population density was 5,048.4 inhabitants per square mile (1,949.2/km^{2}). There were 5,403 housing units at an average density of 1,959.2 per square mile (756.5/km^{2}). The racial makeup of the CDP was 78.78% White, 1.32% African American, 2.00% Native American, 1.85% Asian, 0.96% Pacific Islander, 11.38% from other races, and 3.71% from two or more races. Hispanic or Latino of any race were 18.05% of the population.

There were 5,088 households, out of which 35.8% had children under the age of 18 living with them, 50.0% were married couples living together, 12.9% had a female householder with no husband present, and 31.7% were non-families. 24.5% of all households were made up of individuals, and 10.5% had someone living alone who was 65 years of age or older. The average household size was 2.73 and the average family size was 3.25.

In the CDP, the population was spread out, with 30.3% under the age of 18, 9.3% from 18 to 24, 28.5% from 25 to 44, 20.2% from 45 to 64, and 11.8% who were 65 years of age or older. The median age was 32 years. For every 100 females, there were 95.0 males. For every 100 females age 18 and over, there were 92.9 males.

The median income for a household in the CDP was $36,335, and the median income for a family was $39,746. Males had a median income of $30,550 versus $25,393 for females. The per capita income for the CDP was $15,672. About 13.4% of families and 15.9% of the population were below the poverty line, including 24.3% of those under age 18 and 8.2% of those age 65 or over.
