= Wilco (farm supply cooperative) =

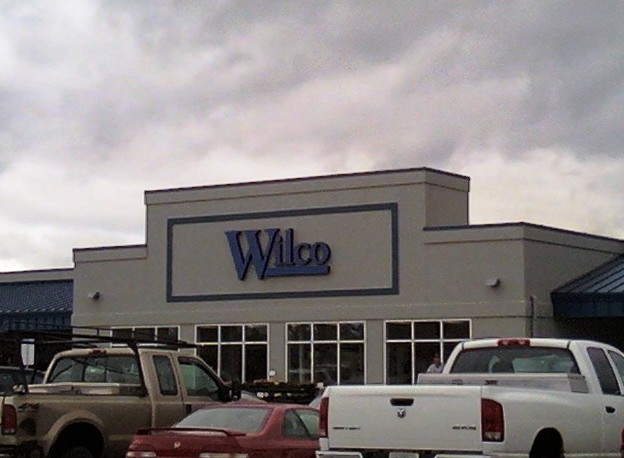
Wilco store in McMinnville, Oregon

Wilco is a farmer-owned farm supply cooperative that began as the Santiam Farmers Co-op in the 1930s based in the Willamette Valley of the U.S. state of Oregon. In 1967, the Santiam Farmers Co-op merged with 4 other co-ops, the Mt. Angel Farmers Union Warehouse, the Donald Farmers Co-op, the Valley Farmers Co-op in Silverton, and the Canby Cooperative to form "Wilco Farmers Co-op". The name "Wilco" comes from a shortening of "Willamette Consolidated".

The cooperative has three divisions — an ag business division that provides customers with crop protection products and fertilizers (Valley Agronomics), a fuels division for commercial petroleum, lubricants, and bulk propane delivery and the farm store division.

Today, the farmer-owned cooperative operates over 25 retail farm stores throughout Oregon, Washington and California. The retailer carries a wide range of hardware supplies alongside land, lawn, garden, livestock, and pet-related products and services.

The farmer-owned cooperative's headquarters are in Mt. Angel, Oregon.

In 2011, Wilco launched a program to support the local National FFA Organization (FFA), called FFA Forever, collecting donations from vendors, employees, and customers. As of 2025, the program had collected more than 2.5 million dollars to benefit the Oregon, Washington, and Caloifornia FFA associations.
