= Mt. Angel Volksfest =

Annual festival in Mt. Angel, Oregon, U.S.

- The festival's logo

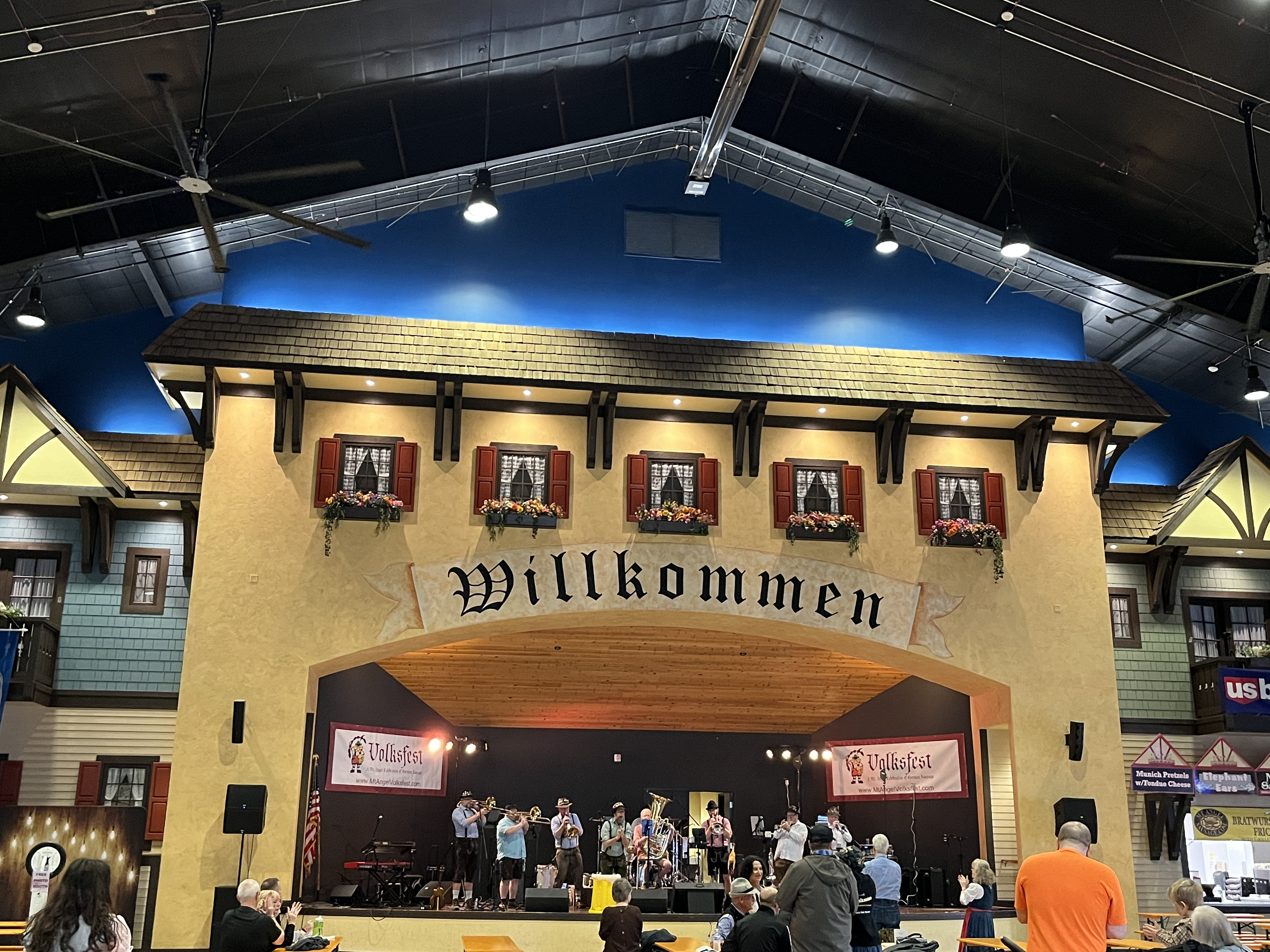
- Interior of the Mt. Angel Community Festhalle during the 2026 event
- Genre: Festival
- Frequency: Annually
- Venue: Mt. Angel Community Festhalle
- Location: Mt. Angel, Oregon
- Country: United States

Mt. Angel Volksfest, formerly known as Mt. Angel Wurstfest, is an annual event in Mt. Angel, Oregon, United States. The German heritage festival is organized by the Mt. Angel Chamber of Commerce. The event features food, drinks, and music, as well as dancing, games, competitive eating, and other live entertainment. Portland Monthly has described Volksfest as "a German sausage–fueled bacchanal in which lederhosen-donning locals dance, drink, and sample a daunting array of wursts". The magazine has also said Volksfest is "mellower" than the Oktoberfest.

The event is held at the Mt. Angel Community Festhalle. It has also hosted a "Wurst Run".
