= St. Mary's Roman Catholic Church (Mount Angel, Oregon) =

Historic church in Oregon, United States

- U.S. National Register of Historic Places
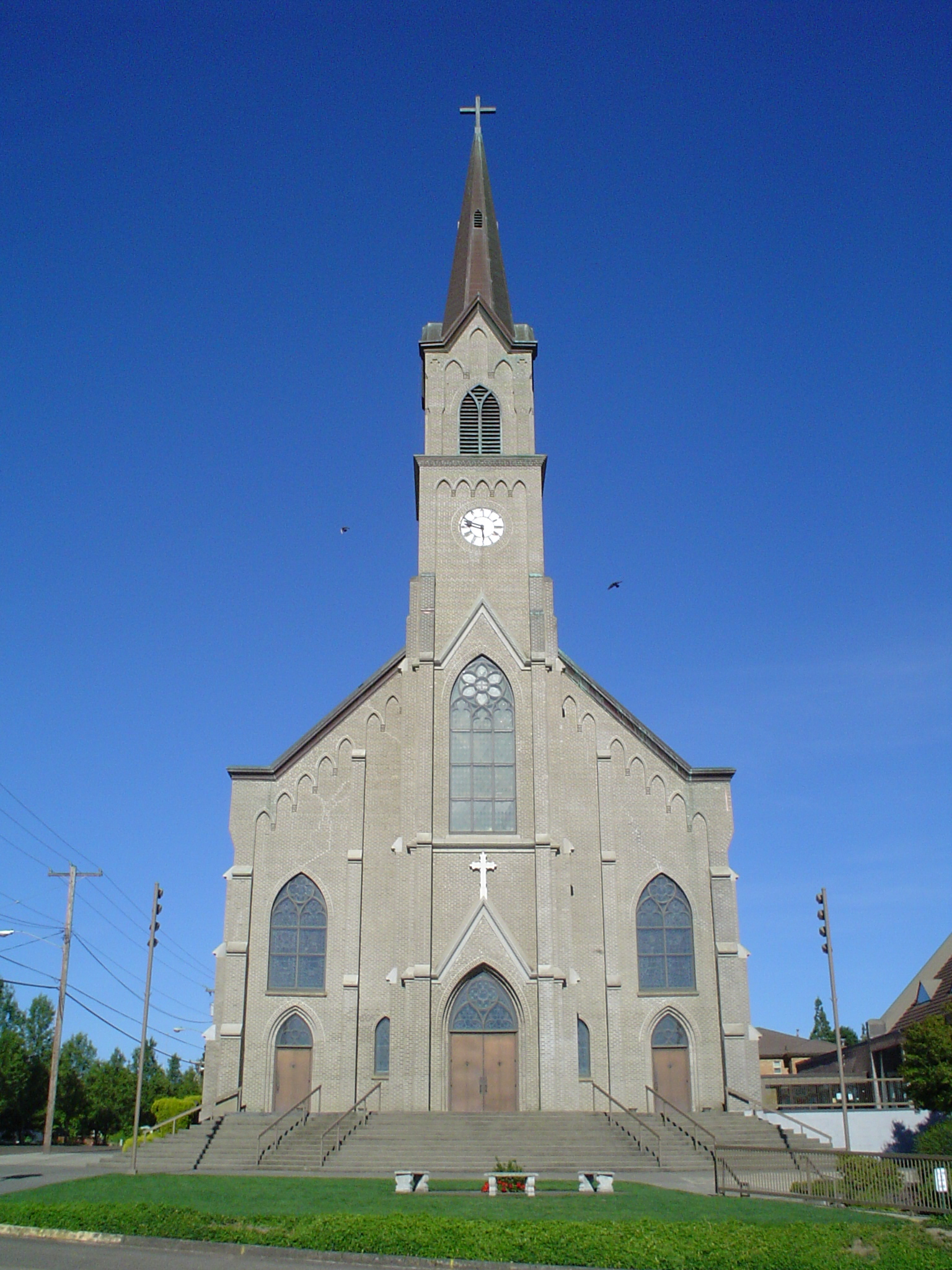
- St. Mary's Roman Catholic Church, Mount Angel, Oregon

- Location within Oregon Location within the United States
- Location: Oregon, Marion County, Oregon
- Coordinates: 45°4′8″N 122°47′49″W
- Area: 0.2 acres (0.081 ha)
- Built: 1912
- Architect: Engelbert Gier
- Architectural style: Gothic Revival
- NRHP reference No.: 76001583
- Added to NRHP: October 22, 1976

St. Mary Catholic Church is a Catholic parish in the city of Mt. Angel, Oregon, United States in Marion County. It was originally established to serve German immigrants who began arriving in this area of the northern Willamette Valley in 1867. Mathias Butsch became the Catholic community's leader and founder. The parish church, built in 1912, was listed on the U.S. National Register of Historic Places in 1976. The church contains 18 original stained-glass windows.
