= Jacob DeShazer =

American WWII pilot and missionary (1912–2008)

Jacob Daniel DeShazer
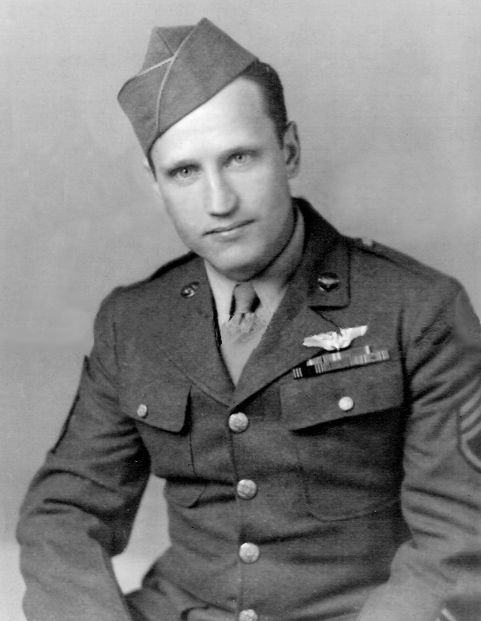
- Jacob Daniel DeShazer, 1945
- Born: November 15, 1912; West Stayton, Oregon
- Died: March 15, 2008 (aged 95); Salem, Oregon
- Burial place: Restlawn Memory Gardens, West Salem, Oregon
- Relatives: Florence DeShazer (wife); Paul, John, Mark, Carol Aiko and Ruth (children)
- Military career
- Allegiance: United States
- Branch: United States Army Air Corps; United States Army Air Forces
- Service years: 1940–1945
- Rank: Staff Sergeant
- Unit: 34th Bomb Squadron
- Conflicts: World War II * Doolittle Raid
- Awards: Distinguished Flying Cross; Purple Heart
- Other work: Missionary

Jacob Daniel DeShazer (15 November 1912 – 15 March 2008) was a Christian missionary in Japan and pilot who participated in the Doolittle Raid as a staff sergeant.

== Early years ==
DeShazer was born on 15 November 1912 in West Stayton, Oregon. He was raised in Central Oregon, and graduated from Madras Middle School in Madras, Oregon in 1931. On 7 December 1941, while peeling potatoes, DeShazer heard the news of the attack on Pearl Harbor over the radio. He became enraged, shouting: "Japan is going to pay for this!" He was raised Christian, but was an atheist at the time.

== Doolittle Raid ==
Following the attack on Pearl Harbor, DeShazer enlisted, becoming a Corporal stationed at Pendleton Field in Eastern Oregon. DeShazer, along with other members of the 17th Bomb Group, volunteered to join a special unit that was formed to attack Japan. The 24 crews selected from the 17th Bomb Group received intensive training at Eglin Field, Florida, for three weeks beginning on 1 March 1942.

The crews undertook practice carrier deck takeoffs along with extensive flying exercises involving low-level and night flying, low-altitude bombing, and over-water navigation. Their mission would be to fly modified B-25 Mitchell bombers launched from an aircraft carrier to attack Japan.

The unit formed to carry out the raid on Japan soon acquired the name, "Doolittle's Raiders", after their commander, Lieutenant Colonel Jimmy Doolittle. Staff Sergeant DeShazer was the bombardier of B-25 #16, the "Bat (Out of Hell)", commanded by Lieutenant William G. Farrow, the last of the 16 B-25s to launch from the USS Hornet. The raid was a success despite the task force being sighted and forced to launch the bombers earlier than planned, but part of the plan included flying the airplanes to bases in China, where they were to be refueled and made part of the Tenth Air Force.

== Japanese prisoner of war ==
After bombing Nagoya, Japan, the "Bat" attempted to reach safe haven in China. DeShazer and the rest of the B-25 crew were forced to parachute into enemy territory over Ningbo, China when their B-25 ran out of fuel because of the extra distance it was forced to fly by early launch of the raid. DeShazer was injured in his fall into a cemetery and along with the rest of his crew, he was captured the next day by Japanese soldiers. During his captivity, DeShazer was sent to Tokyo with the survivors of another Doolittle crew, including Robert Hite, and was held in a series of Prisoner-of-war camps both in Japan and China for 40 months – 34 of them in solitary confinement. He was severely beaten and malnourished while three of the crew were executed by a firing squad, and another died of slow starvation. DeShazer's sentence was commuted to life imprisonment by Emperor Hirohito. As the war came to an end, on 20 August 1945, DeShazer and the others in the camp at Beijing (Peiping), China were finally released when American soldiers parachuted into the camp.

On his return to the United States, Staff Sgt. DeShazer was awarded both the Distinguished Flying Cross and the Purple Heart for his part in the Doolittle Raid.

== Missionary in Japan ==
During his captivity, DeShazer persuaded one of his guards to loan him a copy of the Bible. Although he only had possession of the Bible for three weeks, he saw its messages as the reason for his survival and resolved to become a devout Christian. He was baptized in the cell, using rainwater that was dripping through a high window in his cell. His conversion included learning a few words of Japanese and treating his captors with respect, which resulted in the guards reacting in a similar fashion. After his release, DeShazer used benefits from the G.I. Bill to begin studies at Seattle Pacific College, a Christian college associated with the Free Methodist denomination. There, he met fellow student Florence Matheny, and the two were married in August 1946. They had their first child, Paul, in 1947. Jake and Florence both graduated in 1948, and in December of that year they moved to Japan to become missionaries. They later moved back to the U.S. so that DeShazer could earn his Masters of Divinity degree at Asbury Theological Seminary in Kentucky, then returned to Japan to continue missionary work.

DeShazer, the Doolittle Raider who bombed Nagoya, met Captain Mitsuo Fuchida, who led the attack on Pearl Harbor, and the two became close friends. Fuchida, who became a Christian in 1949 due to shared testimony of a Christian woman, read a tract written about DeShazer, titled I Was a Prisoner of Japan, and spent the rest of his life as a missionary in Asia and the United States. On occasion, DeShazer and Fuchida preached together as Christian missionaries in Japan. In 1959, DeShazer moved to Nagoya to establish a Christian church in the city he had bombed. DeShazer became superintendent of the Eastern Conference of Independent Free Methodist Churches in 1971.

== Later life ==
DeShazer and his wife retired in 1977 after 30 years of missionary service in Japan, and went back to DeShazer's home town of Salem, Oregon, where they both spent the last years of their lives in an assisted living home. On 15 March 2008, DeShazer died in his sleep at the age of 95. He was survived by his wife, Florence; his sister, Helen Hindman; and five children: Paul, John, Mark, Carol, and Ruth. Florence moved to Shoreline, Washington in 2012 and died in 2017.

== Awards and honors ==
His decorations include:

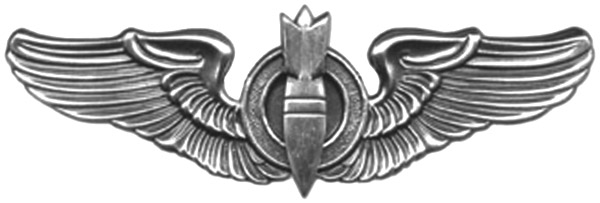

USAAF Bombardier Badge
Distinguished Flying Cross
Purple Heart	Prisoner of War Medal	Army Good Conduct Medal
American Defense Service Medal	American Campaign Medal	Asiatic-Pacific Campaign Medal with bronze campaign star
World War II Victory Medal	Order of Yung Hui; 5th class (Republic of China)	War Memorial Medal (Republic of China)

=== Other honors ===
On 15 April 2008, the Oregon War Veterans Association (OWVA) nominated DeShazer for the Presidential Medal of Freedom and the Congressional Gold Medal, noting his extraordinary impact on America as a war hero and for his heroic service to the people of Japan. On 21 April 2008, the White House confirmed the nomination in a letter to OWVA's executive director, Greg Warnock. Warnock nominated Rev. DeShazer for the Congressional Gold Medal through Congresswoman Darlene Hooley's (D-Ore.) office in Salem, Oregon. In the official nomination letters Warnock wrote, "At this time in our history, we feel it is ideal to honor a man who was a genuine war hero, [but] who after his sacrificial service put on gloves of peace, and touched the entire world with grace and humility."

== See also ==
- Oregon World War II Army Airfields
- Oregon World War II Memorial
- Robert G. Emmens
- Everett W. Holstrom
- David M. Jones
- Louis Zamperini
