= Rosedale, Oregon =

Unincorporated community in Oregon, United States

Coordinates: 44°51′12.5″N 123°03′40.5″W

Rosedale is an unincorporated community in Marion County, Oregon, United States. It is located just south of Salem, in the Salem Hills. It is a part of the Salem Metropolitan Statistical Area.

Rosedale post office ran from 1892 to 1901.

The Rosedale area was a major prune growing region in the early 20th century but is now primarily made up of rural residential properties, vineyards, and Christmas tree fields.

Rosedale Elementary School, located at 6974 Bates Road, Salem, was in service from 1893 until its closing in 2012. The town was located around the area of Sunnyside Road SE and Delany Road SE. It had a gas station, post office, grocery store, and feed, seed and livery stable. The community still has a church and cemetery founded in 1896 located at 452 Hylo Rd SE.

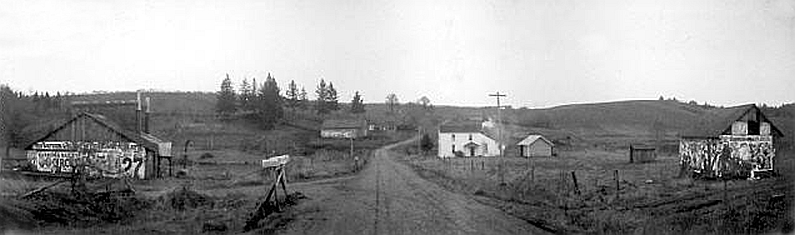
Rosedale, 1915
