= Howell Prairie =

Area west of Silverton, Oregon

Howell Prairie is an area west of Silverton, Oregon, United States, between the Little Pudding River and the Pudding River. It was named for John Howell, a pioneer of 1843. Howell Prairie post office was established in 1876 and closed in 1881. In 1887 a post office named Howell was established at 44.99139°N 122.87806°W; it closed in 1902. The Oregonian Railway Company also had a station named Howell Prairie, which was changed to Switzerland in 1892.

Settlements and locales on Howell Prairie include Geer, Durbin, Pratum, Central Howell, and North Howell.

== See also ==
- Waldo Hills
