= Labish Village, Oregon =

Unincorporated community in the state of Oregon, United States

- Census-designated place
- Location in Marion County and the state of Oregon
- Coordinates: 45°01′09″N 122°58′25″W
- Country: United States
- State: Oregon
- County: Marion

Area
  - Total: 0.054 sq mi (0.14 km^{2})
  - Land: 0.054 sq mi (0.14 km^{2})
  - Water: 0 sq mi (0.00 km^{2})
- Elevation: 151 ft (46 m)

Population (2020)
  - Total: 454
  - Density: 8,399.2/sq mi (3,242.93/km^{2})
- Time zone: UTC-8 (Pacific (PST))
  - Summer (DST): UTC-7 (PDT)
- ZIP Code: 97305 (Salem)
- Area codes: 503 and 971
- FIPS code: 41-40050
- GNIS feature ID: 2408519

Labish Village is an unincorporated community and census-designated place (CDP) in Marion County, Oregon, United States. The population was 454 at the 2020 census. It is part of the Salem Metropolitan Statistical Area.

== Geography ==
The community is in western Marion County on the east side of Oregon Route 99E. It is 7 miles (11 km) northeast of the center of Salem and 11 miles (18 km) southwest of Woodburn. According to the U.S. Census Bureau, the CDP has a total area of 0.05 square miles (0.13 km^{2}), all land.

== Demographics ==
Historical population
Census	Pop.	Note	%±
2000	376		—
2010	412		9.6%
2020	454		10.2%
U.S. Decennial Census

As of the census of 2000, there were 376 people, 93 households, and 77 families residing in the CDP. The population density was 6,712.1 inhabitants per square mile (2,591.6/km^{2}). There were 101 housing units at an average density of 1,803.0 per square mile (696.1/km^{2}). The racial makeup of the CDP was 51.06% White, 2.93% Native American, 0.27% Asian, 41.49% from other races, and 4.26% from two or more races. Hispanic or Latino of any race were 52.39% of the population.

There were 93 households, out of which 49.5% had children under the age of 18 living with them, 57.0% were married couples living together, 10.8% had a female householder with no husband present, and 17.2% were non-families. 12.9% of all households were made up of individuals, and 4.3% had someone living alone who was 65 years of age or older. The average household size was 4.04 and the average family size was 4.13.

In the CDP, the population was spread out, with 36.7% under the age of 18, 14.4% from 18 to 24, 29.8% from 25 to 44, 14.9% from 45 to 64, and 4.3% who were 65 years of age or older. The median age was 24 years. For every 100 females, there were 111.2 males. For every 100 females age 18 and over, there were 138.0 males.

The median income for a household in the CDP was $29,345, and the median income for a family was $28,750. Males had a median income of $17,000 versus $20,000 for females. The per capita income for the CDP was $8,789. About 12.9% of families and 10.5% of the population were below the poverty line, including 12.4% of those under age 18 and none of those age 65 or over.
