= Salem metropolitan area, Oregon =

Metropolitan statistical area in Oregon, US

Salem metropolitan area/Mid-Valley
- Metropolitan statistical area
- Salem, OR Metropolitan Statistical Area
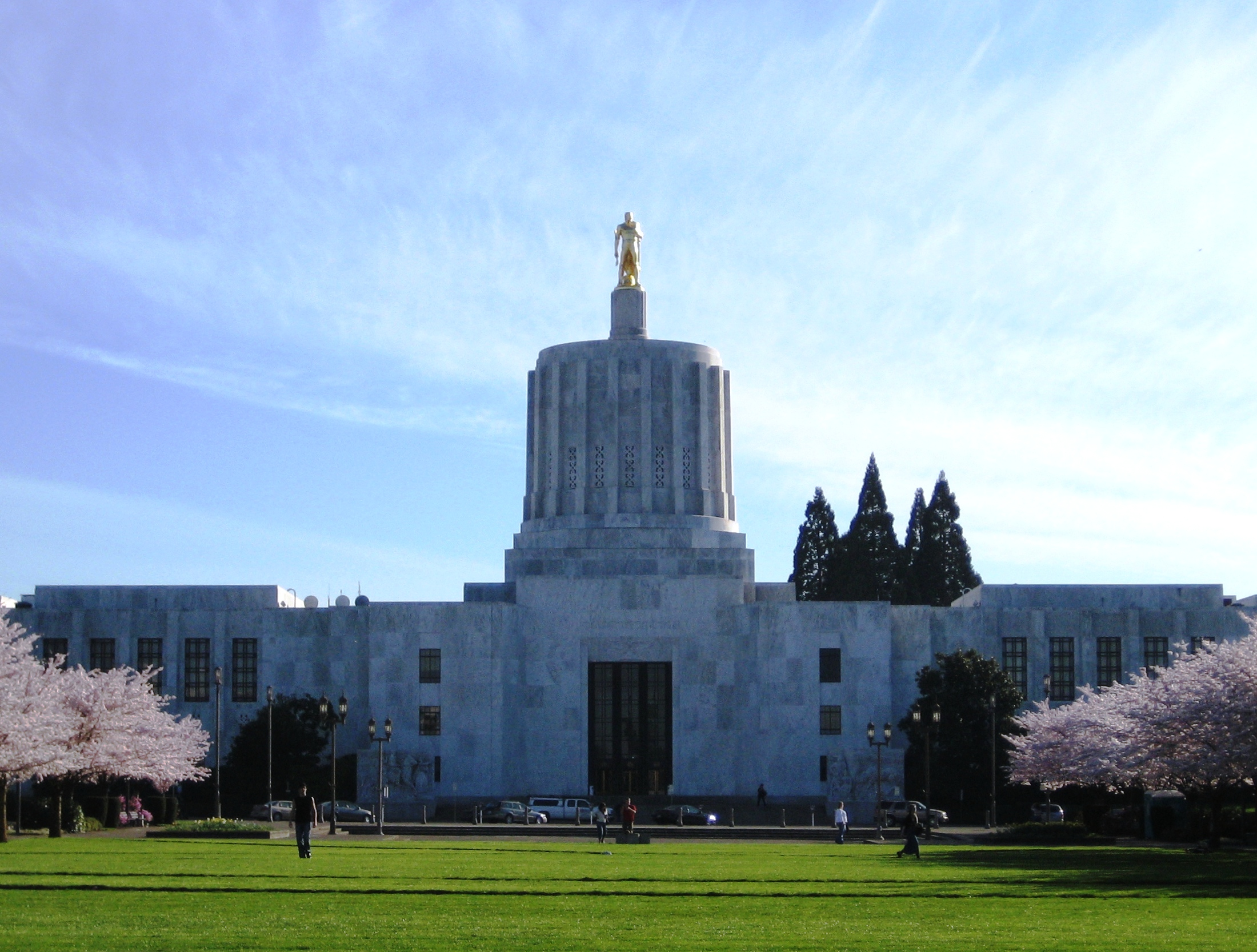
- Oregon State Capitol
Interactive map of Salem, OR MSA
City of Salem
Salem, OR MSA
Other Counties in the Portland, OR–WA CSA
- Coordinates: 44°54′12″N 122°54′11″W
- Country: United States
- State: Oregon
- Largest city: Salem
- Other cities: Keizer; Woodburn; Dallas

Area
  - Total: 4,978.287 sq mi (12,893.70 km^{2})

Population (2020)
  - Total: 433,353 (Metro); 3,280,736 (Combined)
  - Estimate (2024): 443,416 (Metro); 3,326,675 (Combined)
  - Rank: Metro: 123rd in the U.S. Combined: 20th in the U.S.
  - Density: 230.7/sq mi (89.07/km^{2})

GDP
  - Total: $25.734 billion (2023)
- Time zone: UTC–8 (Pacific (PST))
  - Summer (DST): UTC–7 (PDT)
- Area codes: 503 and 971

The Salem metropolitan statistical area, as defined by the United States Census Bureau, is a metropolitan statistical area consisting of two counties in western Oregon, Marion and Polk. The principal city is Salem, the state capital, with an estimated population of 181,779 in 2025.

A July 1, 2025 census estimate placed the population at 445,814, an increase of 2.88% from the 2020 census, an increase of 14.01% from the 2010 census, and an increase of 28.40% from the 2000 census.

== Counties ==
County	Seat	2025 estimate	2020 census	Change	Area	Density
Marion	Salem	355,777	345,920	+2.85%	1,194 sq mi (3,090 km^{2})	298/sq mi (115/km^{2})
Polk	Dallas	90,037	87,433	+2.98%	744 sq mi (1,930 km^{2})	121/sq mi (47/km^{2})
Total		445,814	433,353	+2.88%	1,938 sq mi (5,020 km^{2})	230/sq mi (89/km^{2})

== Communities ==
=== Incorporated Places ===
- Salem (180,406)
- Keizer (39,152)
- Woodburn (30,449)
- Dallas (17,911)
- Monmouth (11,651)
- Independence (10,295)
- Silverton (10,391)
- Stayton (8,521)
- Aumsville (4,216)
- Jefferson (3,296)
- Mount Angel (3,436)
- Hubbard (3,402)
- Sublimity (2,879)
- Gervais (2,571)
- Turner (2,414)
- Mill City (2,128)
- Aurora (1,122)
- Falls City (1,057)
- Donald (1,013)
- Gates (487)
- St. Paul (426)
- Scotts Mills (417)
- Detroit (189)
- Idanha (157)

=== Census-designated places ===
- Hayesville (21,891)
- Four Corners (16,740)
- Grand Ronde (2,010)
- Brooks (472)
- Labish Village (454)
- Mehama (317)
- Marion (307)
- Butteville (273)
- Fort Hill (154)
- Rickreall (76)
- Eola (60)

=== Unincorporated places ===
- Breitenbush
- Monitor
- Pedee
- Perrydale
- Pratum
- Rosedale
- Saint Louis
- West Stayton
- Zena

== Demographics ==
Historical population
Census	Pop.	Note	%±
1850	2,749		—
1860	10,713		289.7%
1870	14,666		36.9%
1880	21,177		44.4%
1890	30,792		45.4%
1900	37,636		22.2%
1910	53,249		41.5%
1920	61,368		15.2%
1930	77,399		26.1%
1940	95,235		23.0%
1950	127,718		34.1%
1960	147,411		15.4%
1970	186,658		26.6%
1980	249,895		33.9%
1990	278,024		11.3%
2000	347,214		24.9%
2010	390,738		12.5%
2020	433,353		10.9%
2024 (est.)	443,416		2.3%
U.S. Decennial Census; 1790–1960 1900–1990; 1990–2000 2010–2020

=== 2020 census ===
As of the 2020 census, there were 433,353 people, 154,721 households, and _ families residing in the MSA. The population density was 87.05 inhabitants per square mile (33.6/km^{2}). There were 162,369 housing units at an average density of 32.62 per square mile (12.6/km^{2}). The racial makeup of the MSA was 64.24% White, 1.03% African American, 1.09% Native American, 2.07% Asian, 0.93% Pacific Islander, 0.49% from some other races and 5.13% from two or more races. Hispanic or Latino people of any race were 25.03% of the population.

The median income for a household in the MSA was $72,150, and the median income for a family was $78,500. Males had a median income of $49,285 versus $44,117 for females. The per capita income for the MSA was $34,126.

== See also ==
- Oregon census statistical areas
