= Middle Grove, Oregon =

Unincorporated community in the state of Oregon, United States

- Unincorporated community
- Location within Oregon Location within the United States
- Coordinates: 44°58′11″N 122°57′55″W
- Country: United States
- State: Oregon
- County: Marion
- Elevation: 203 ft (62 m)
- Time zone: UTC-8 (Pacific (PST))
  - Summer (DST): UTC-7 (PDT)
- ZIP code: 97305
- Area codes: 503 and 971
- GNIS feature ID: 1124120

Middle Grove is an unincorporated community in Marion County, Oregon, United States. The community is within the Hayesville CDP and the Salem urban growth boundary, on Silverton Road just east of Salem.
