= Mt. Angel School District =

School district in Oregon, United States

Coordinates: 45°04′25.74″N 122°47′22.44″W

Location
- 730 E Marquam Street; Mt. Angel, Oregon 97362

District information
- Grades: K-12
- Superintendent: Troy Stoops
- Chair of the board: Rod Hill
- NCES District ID: 4108550

Other information
- Website: masd91.org

Mt. Angel School District (91) is a public school district in Mt. Angel, Oregon, United States. Schools in the district include the John F. Kennedy High School, Mt. Angel Middle School, and St. Mary's Public School. Administrative headquarters are at 730 East Marquam Street in Mt. Angel. Troy Stoops is the district superintendent.
