= Pratum, Oregon =

Unincorporated community in the state of Oregon, United States

- Unincorporated community
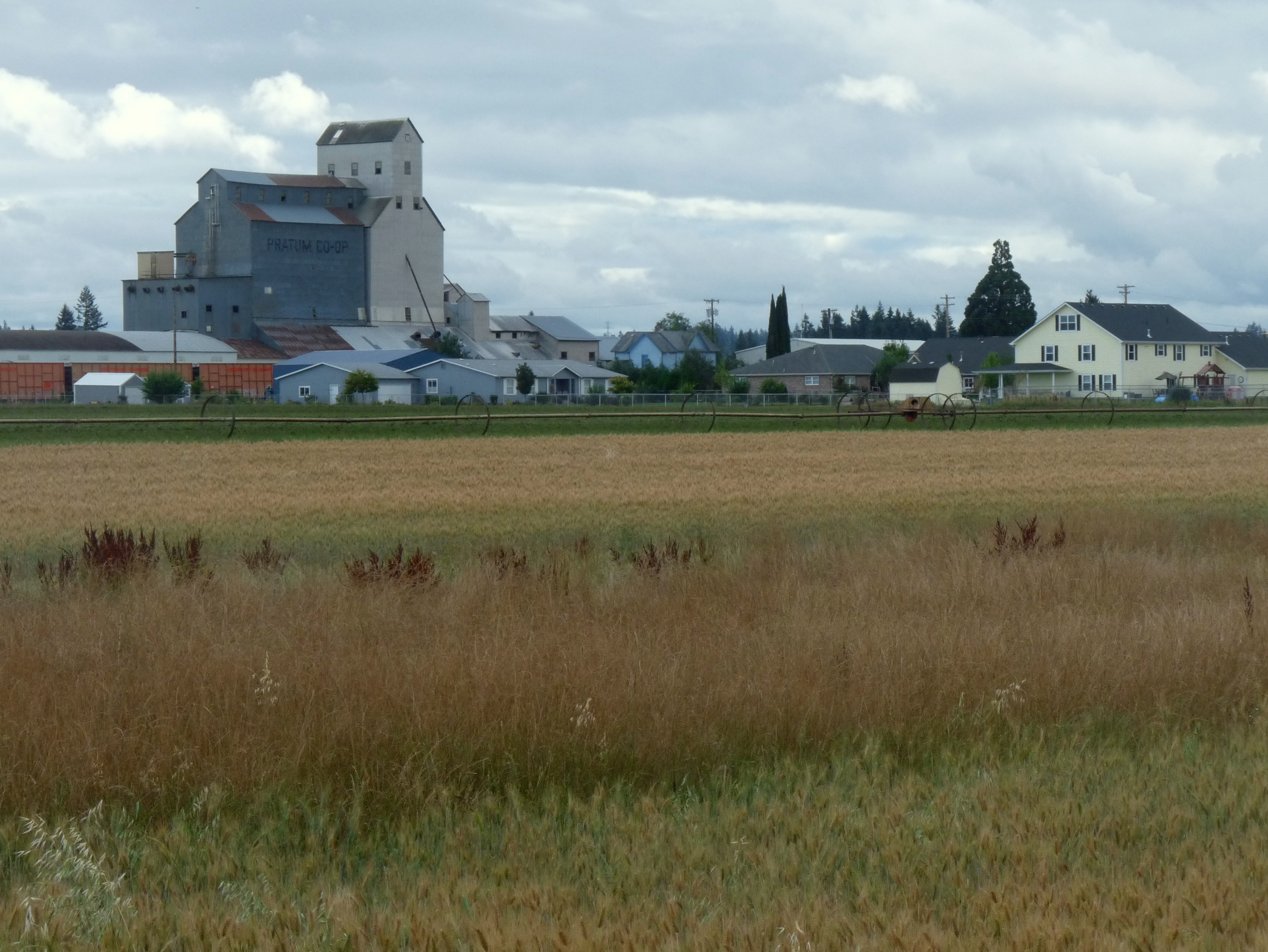
- Pratum as seen from Howell Prairie Road

- Location within Oregon Location within the United States
- Coordinates: 44°57′32″N 122°52′43″W
- Country: United States
- State: Oregon
- County: Marion
- Elevation: 230 ft (70 m)
- Time zone: UTC-8 (Pacific (PST))
  - Summer (DST): UTC-7 (PDT)
- ZIP code: 97305
- Area codes: 503 and 971
- GNIS feature ID: 1166698

Pratum is an unincorporated community in Marion County, Oregon, United States. It is located northeast of Salem on Howell Prairie near the Pudding River. Pratum is Latin for "meadow". The community was settled in the late 19th century by a group of Mennonites, many of them of Swiss extraction. A branch of the narrow-gauge Oregonian Railway was built through the area in about 1880, and the station there was called "East Side Junction". The railway was eventually converted to standard gauge, and is still in use today by the Willamette Valley Railway. In 1895, the station was renamed "Enger" after a good friend by a Mr. Larson who platted a townsite by that name in 1898 (still on file at Marion County) and opened the first store there. The name "Enger" was rejected by the postal service as too easily confused with Eugene, however, and the name of the station changed to "Pratum". Pratum post office was established in 1887, and was originally called "Switzerland", then "Enger" and finally "Pratum" in 1898, matching the railroad station. The post office ran until 1964.

Pratum Elementary School, was built in 1928 and was originally its own district but has since become part of the Silver Falls School District, and is still operating. The community is home to Emmanuel Bible Church (formerly Emanuel Mennonite Church). The Pratum Co-op was established in 1946 and still occupies the original site along the railroad as well as several others in close proximity, though the landmark grain elevators have recently been torn down. The co-op has expanded geographically over the years and the headquarters relocated to Salem, but the name based on this small community has been retained.

The community is part of the Salem Metropolitan Statistical Area.

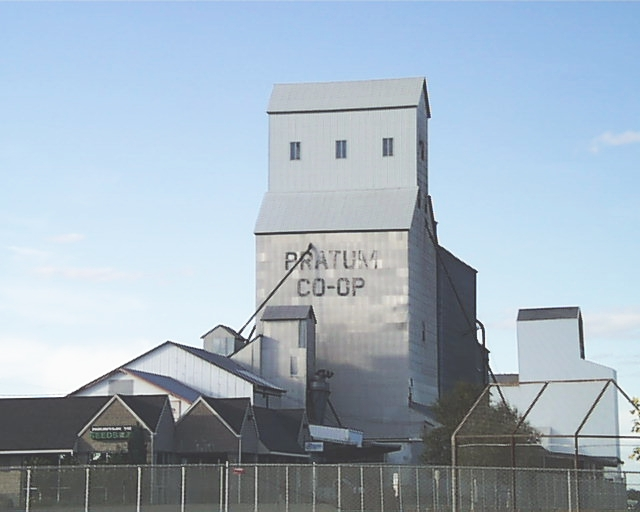
Pratum grain elevator (razed in 2023).
