= Marion County, Oregon =

County in Oregon, United States

- County
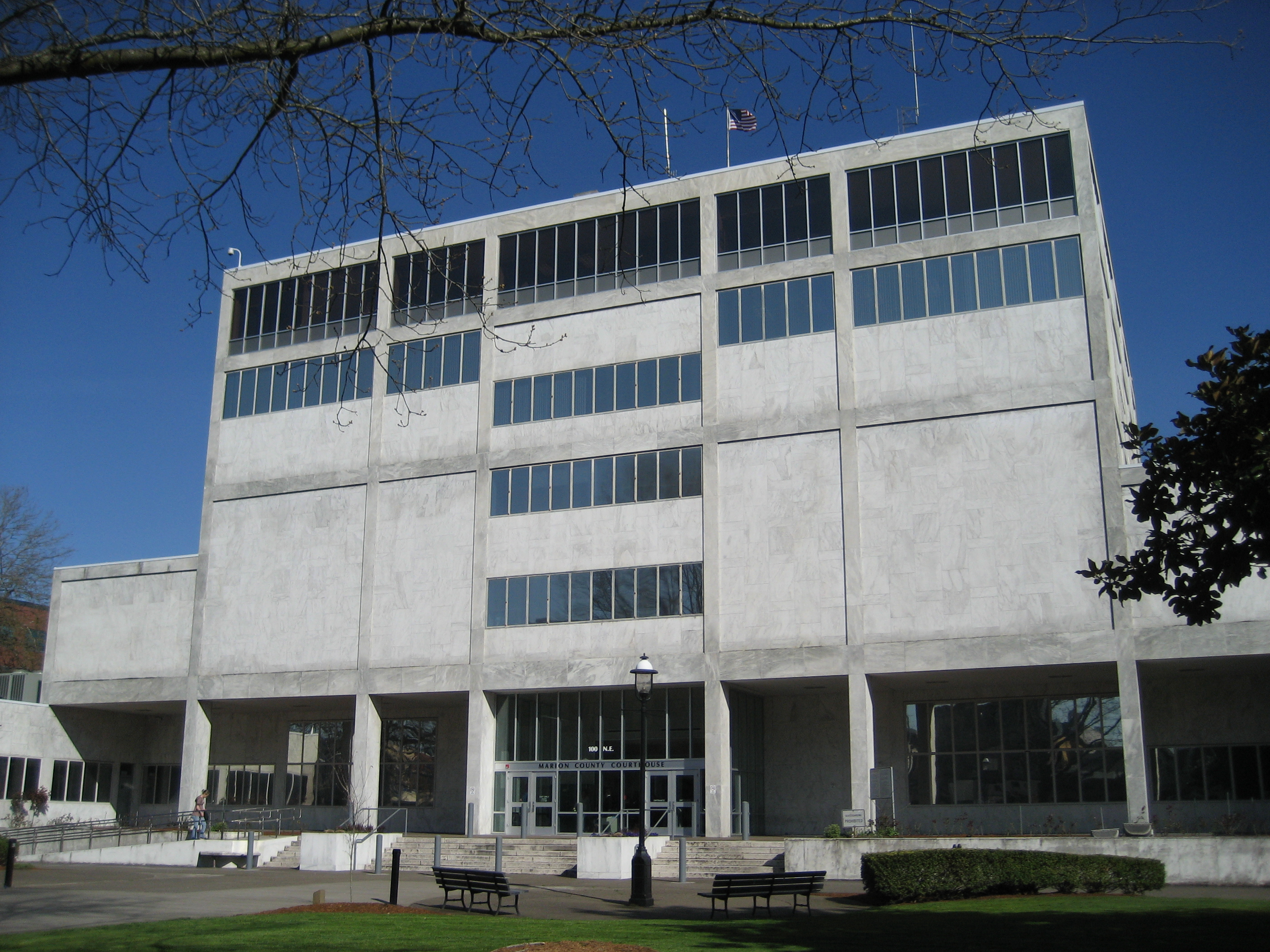
- Marion County Courthouse in Salem

- Location within the U.S. state of Oregon
- Coordinates: 44°55′N 122°35′W
- Country: United States
- State: Oregon
- Founded: July 5, 1843
- Named for: Francis Marion
- Seat: Salem
- Largest city: Salem

Area
  - Total: 1,194 sq mi (3,090 km^{2})
  - Land: 1,184 sq mi (3,070 km^{2})
  - Water: 10 sq mi (26 km^{2}) 0.85%

Population (2020)
  - Total: 345,920
  - Estimate (2025): 355,777 ▲
  - Density: 292.2/sq mi (112.8/km^{2})
- Time zone: UTC−8 (Pacific)
  - Summer (DST): UTC−7 (PDT)
- Congressional districts: 2nd, 5th, 6th
- Website: www.co.marion.or.us

Map of Marion County

Marion County is one of the 36 counties in the U.S. state of Oregon. The population was 345,920 at the 2020 census, making it the 5th most populous county in Oregon. The county seat is Salem, which is also the state capital of Oregon. The county was originally named the Champooick District, after Champoeg (earlier Champooick), a meeting place on the Willamette River. On September 3, 1849, the territorial legislature renamed it in honor of Francis Marion, a Continental Army general from South Carolina who served in the American Revolutionary War. Marion County is part of the Salem, OR Metropolitan Statistical Area, which is also included in the Portland-Vancouver-Salem, OR-WA Combined Statistical Area. It is located in the Willamette Valley.

== History ==
Marion County was created by the Provisional Legislature of Oregon on July 5, 1843, as the Champooick District, one of the original four districts of the Oregon Country along with Twality (later Washington), Clackamas, and Yamhill counties. The four districts were redesignated as counties in 1845.

Originally, this political entity stretched southward to the California border and eastward to the Rocky Mountains. With the creation of Wasco, Linn, Polk, and other counties, its area was reduced in size. Marion County's present geographical boundaries were established in 1856.

In 1849, Salem was designated the county seat. The territorial capital was moved from Oregon City to Salem in 1852. The ensuing controversy over the location of the capital was settled in 1864 when Salem was confirmed as the state capital.

== Geography ==
According to the United States Census Bureau, the county has a total area of 1,193 square miles (3,090 km^{2}), of which 1,182 square miles (3,060 km^{2}) is land and 10 square miles (26 km^{2}) (0.9%) is water.

=== Adjacent counties ===
- Yamhill County (northwest)
- Clackamas County (north)
- Wasco County (northeast)
- Jefferson County (east)
- Linn County (south)
- Polk County (west)

=== National protected areas ===
- Ankeny National Wildlife Refuge
- Mount Hood National Forest (part)
- Willamette National Forest (part)

== Demographics ==
Historical population
Census	Pop.	Note	%±
1850	2,749		—
1860	7,088		157.8%
1870	9,965		40.6%
1880	14,576		46.3%
1890	22,934		57.3%
1900	27,713		20.8%
1910	39,780		43.5%
1920	47,187		18.6%
1930	60,541		28.3%
1940	75,246		24.3%
1950	101,401		34.8%
1960	120,888		19.2%
1970	151,309		25.2%
1980	204,692		35.3%
1990	228,483		11.6%
2000	284,834		24.7%
2010	315,335		10.7%
2020	345,920		9.7%
2025 (est.)	355,777	▲	2.8%
U.S. Decennial Census; 1790–1960 1900–1990; 1990–2000 2010–2020

=== 2020 census ===
Marion County, Oregon – Racial and ethnic composition Note: the US Census treats Hispanic/Latino as an ethnic category. This table excludes Latinos from the racial categories and assigns them to a separate category. Hispanics/Latinos may be of any race.
Race / Ethnicity (NH = Non-Hispanic)	Pop 1980	Pop 1990	Pop 2000	Pop 2010	Pop 2020	% 1980	% 1990	% 2000	% 2010	% 2020
White alone (NH)	188,875	201,218	217,880	216,758	213,650	92.27%	88.07%	76.49%	68.74%	61.76%
Black or African American alone (NH)	1,233	2,039	2,274	2,906	3,787	0.60%	0.89%	0.80%	0.92%	1.09%
Native American or Alaska Native alone (NH)	1,977	2,970	3,326	3,290	3,124	0.97%	1.30%	1.17%	1.04%	0.90%
Asian alone (NH)	1,975	3,874	4,905	5,790	7,270	0.96%	1.70%	1.72%	1.84%	2.10%
Native Hawaiian or Pacific Islander alone (NH)	x	x	967	2,254	3,669	x	x	0.34%	0.71%	1.06%
Other race alone (NH)	930	157	337	411	1,701	0.45%	0.07%	0.12%	0.13%	0.49%
Mixed race or Multiracial (NH)	x	x	6,431	7,332	16,979	x	x	2.26%	2.33%	4.91%
Hispanic or Latino (any race)	9,702	18,225	48,714	76,594	95,740	4.74%	7.98%	17.10%	24.29%	27.68%
Total	204,692	228,483	284,834	315,335	345,920	100.00%	100.00%	100.00%	100.00%	100.00%

As of the 2020 census, the county had a population of 345,920. Of the residents, 24.0% were under the age of 18 and 16.8% were 65 years of age or older; the median age was 37.1 years. For every 100 females there were 99.2 males, and for every 100 females age 18 and over there were 97.3 males. 84.6% of residents lived in urban areas and 15.4% lived in rural areas.

The racial makeup of the county was 67.4% White, 1.2% Black or African American, 2.0% American Indian and Alaska Native, 2.2% Asian, 1.1% Native Hawaiian and Pacific Islander, 13.8% from some other race, and 12.3% from two or more races; Hispanic or Latino residents of any race comprised 27.7% of the population. Non-Hispanic whites alone made up 61.8% of the population, while non-Hispanic African Americans were 1.1%, non-Hispanic Native Americans 0.9%, non-Hispanic Asians 2.1%, and non-Hispanic people reporting two or more races 4.9%.

There were 122,586 households in the county, of which 33.3% had children under the age of 18 living with them and 26.3% had a female householder with no spouse or partner present. About 23.8% of all households were made up of individuals and 11.4% had someone living alone who was 65 years of age or older.

There were 128,541 housing units, of which 4.6% were vacant. Among occupied housing units, 61.3% were owner-occupied and 38.7% were renter-occupied. The homeowner vacancy rate was 1.1% and the rental vacancy rate was 4.4%.

=== 2010 census ===
As of the 2010 census, there were 315,335 people, 112,957 households, and 77,044 families living in the county. The population density was 266.7 inhabitants per square mile (103.0/km^{2}). There were 120,948 housing units at an average density of 102.3 units per square mile (39.5 units/km^{2}). The racial makeup of the county was 78.2% white, 1.9% Asian, 1.6% American Indian, 1.1% black or African American, 0.7% Pacific islander, 12.6% from other races, and 3.9% from two or more races. Those of Hispanic or Latino origin made up 24.3% of the population. In terms of ancestry, 22.1% were German, 11.4% were English, 11.0% were Irish, and 4.7% were American.

Of the 112,957 households, 35.5% had children under the age of 18 living with them, 50.4% were married couples living together, 12.4% had a female householder with no husband present, 31.8% were non-families, and 25.0% of all households were made up of individuals. The average household size was 2.70 and the average family size was 3.23. The median age was 35.1 years.

The median income for a household in the county was $46,069 and the median income for a family was $54,661. Males had a median income of $39,239 versus $32,288 for females. The per capita income for the county was $21,915. About 11.7% of families and 16.0% of the population were below the poverty line, including 23.8% of those under age 18 and 7.6% of those age 65 or over.

=== 2000 census ===
As of the 2000 census, there were 284,834 people, 101,641 households, and 70,437 families living in the county. The population density was 241 inhabitants per square mile (93/km^{2}). There were 108,174 housing units at an average density of 91 units per square mile (35 units/km^{2}). The racial makeup of the county was 81.62% White, 0.89% Black or African American, 1.44% Native American, 1.75% Asian, 0.36% Pacific Islander, 10.58% from other races, and 3.35% from two or more races. 17.10% of the population were Hispanic or Latino of any race. 18.4% were of German, 9.2% English, 8.2% American and 7.4% Irish ancestry. 80.8% spoke only English at home, while 14.8% spoke Spanish and 1.4% Russian.

There were 101,641 households, out of which 34.50% had children under the age of 18 living with them, 53.70% were married couples living together, 11.00% had a female householder with no husband present, and 30.70% were non-families. 24.00% of all households were made up of individuals, and 9.50% had someone living alone who was 65 years of age or older. The average household size was 2.70 and the average family size was 3.19.

In the county, 27.40% of the population was under the age of 18, 10.30% was from 18 to 24, 28.70% from 25 to 44, 21.20% from 45 to 64, and 12.40% was 65 years of age or older. The median age was 34 years. For every 100 females, there were 101.10 males. For every 100 females age 18 and over, there were 99.50 males.

The median income for a household in the county was $40,314, and the median income for a family was $46,202. Males had a median income of $33,841 versus $26,283 for females. The per capita income for the county was $18,408. About 9.60% of families and 13.50% of the population were below the poverty line, including 18.10% of those under age 18 and 7.40% of those age 65 or over.

== Law and government ==
=== Elected officials ===
Marion County is among the 24 of Oregon's 36 counties that operate under a board of commissioners (BOC) of three members elected countywide to 4-year terms. In Marion County these are partisan races. Commissioners, who are full-time, salaried officials, have executive, legislative, and quasi-judicial powers (the latter in land-use cases). The Board of Commissioners serves as the governing body. The commissioners elect their chair annually; in practice, in Marion County the chair rotates annually. The BOC is responsible for accepting funds from sources outside the county, strategic planning, and enacting ordinances as needed to carry out plans and serve the public. The BOC also prepares a county budget in cooperation with the elected heads of the various departments. The BOC is required by law to appoint a Budget Officer who presents a budget to the Budget Committee composed of the Commissioners and three public members. County commissioners appoint and oversee non-elected department heads, officers, boards, and commissions.

In addition to the Board of Commissioners, the county has non-partisan positions that are elected in county-wide elections for four year terms: Assessor, Clerk, Treasurer, District Attorney, and Sheriff. Further, the county elects one Justice of the Peace (Justice Court Judge) to a six year term. These officers are accountable to the voters, rather than to the Board of Commissioners, although they work with the Commissioners in establishing a county budget. All are full-time, paid county officers.

==== County Commission ====
District	Name
Commissioner, District 1	Kevin Cameron
Commissioner, District 2	Danielle Bethell
Commissioner, District 3	Colm Willis

== Politics ==
Although Democrats took the presidential vote with pluralities in 1996, 2008, and 2020, no Democrat has carried a majority of the county since Lyndon Johnson in 1964. Marion County is one of 13 counties to have voted for Barack Obama in 2008, Mitt Romney in 2012, Donald Trump in 2016, and Joe Biden in 2020. (Note: The other twelve are Butte County, California; Teton County, Idaho; Kendall County, Illinois; McLean County, Illinois; Tippecanoe County, Indiana; Kent County, Michigan; Kent County, Maryland; Leelanau County, Michigan; Carroll County, New Hampshire; Rockingham County, New Hampshire; Grand County, Utah; and Albany County, Wyoming.)

United States presidential election results for Marion County, Oregon
Year	Republican		Democratic		Third party(ies)	
Year	No.	%	No.	%	No.	%
1880	2,051	59.21%	1,386	40.01%	27	0.78%
1884	2,193	56.07%	1,627	41.60%	91	2.33%
1888	2,235	54.08%	1,567	37.91%	331	8.01%
1892	2,979	49.77%	879	14.69%	2,127	35.54%
1896	3,744	50.98%	3,419	46.56%	181	2.46%
1900	3,112	54.38%	2,318	40.50%	293	5.12%
1904	4,106	70.03%	1,084	18.49%	673	11.48%
1908	3,788	57.24%	2,239	33.83%	591	8.93%
1912	2,523	31.21%	2,588	32.01%	2,974	36.78%
1916	8,316	55.48%	5,699	38.02%	973	6.49%
1920	8,798	66.16%	3,831	28.81%	669	5.03%
1924	8,351	52.14%	3,996	24.95%	3,669	22.91%
1928	11,754	61.96%	6,998	36.89%	219	1.15%
1932	8,633	39.01%	12,572	56.81%	926	4.18%
1936	8,595	32.97%	15,536	59.59%	1,940	7.44%
1940	16,940	54.25%	14,031	44.93%	256	0.82%
1944	16,176	56.56%	11,907	41.63%	518	1.81%
1948	18,997	57.27%	13,183	39.74%	991	2.99%
1952	29,887	70.41%	12,337	29.06%	224	0.53%
1956	28,990	64.19%	16,170	35.81%	0	0.00%
1960	29,124	58.28%	20,791	41.61%	55	0.11%
1964	18,897	36.90%	32,091	62.67%	221	0.43%
1968	30,417	54.80%	22,327	40.23%	2,758	4.97%
1972	36,441	57.51%	23,908	37.73%	3,012	4.75%
1976	35,497	49.08%	33,781	46.70%	3,053	4.22%
1980	42,191	49.38%	32,134	37.61%	11,124	13.02%
1984	54,535	59.79%	36,440	39.95%	234	0.26%
1988	45,292	51.18%	41,193	46.55%	2,007	2.27%
1992	42,145	38.20%	41,137	37.28%	27,052	24.52%
1996	46,415	43.19%	48,637	45.26%	12,411	11.55%
2000	57,443	50.68%	49,430	43.61%	6,461	5.70%
2004	69,900	53.93%	57,671	44.49%	2,048	1.58%
2008	59,059	47.41%	61,816	49.63%	3,688	2.96%
2012	60,190	50.00%	56,376	46.83%	3,810	3.17%
2016	63,377	46.31%	57,788	42.23%	15,675	11.45%
2020	79,002	47.73%	80,872	48.86%	5,660	3.42%
2024	77,089	49.20%	73,970	47.21%	5,632	3.59%

== Economy ==
Agriculture and food processing are important to the county's economy, as are lumber, manufacturing, and education. Marion County is the leader in agricultural production among all other Oregon counties. Marion County has 10,640 acres (43.1 km^{2}) planted in orchards. The marionberry was named after the county. Government, however, is the county's main employer and economic base.

== Education ==
=== Tertiary education ===
Marion County is the home of Willamette University, Corban University, and Chemeketa Community College. All of Marion County is within the Chemeketa community college district.

=== K-12 schools ===
Public K-12 school districts include:

- Cascade School District 5
- Central School District 13J
- Gervais School District 1
- Jefferson School District 14J
- Mt. Angel School District 91
- North Marion School District 15
- North Santiam School District 29J
- Salem-Keizer School District 24J
- Santiam Canyon School District 129J
- Silver Falls School District 4J
- St. Paul School District 45
- Woodburn School District

State-operated schools:

- Oregon School for the Deaf

The Oregon School for the Blind closed in 2009.

Bureau of Indian Education-affiliated tribal school:

- Chemawa Indian School

== Communities ==
=== Cities ===
- Aumsville
- Aurora
- Detroit
- Donald
- Gates (part)
- Gervais
- Hubbard
- Idanha (part)
- Jefferson
- Keizer
- Mill City (part)
- Mt. Angel
- St. Paul
- Salem (county seat, part)
- Scotts Mills
- Silverton
- Stayton
- Sublimity
- Turner
- Woodburn

=== Census-designated places ===
- Brooks
- Butteville
- Four Corners
- Hayesville
- Labish Village
- Marion
- Mehama

=== Locales, etc. ===
- Champoeg
- Saint Benedict

=== Unincorporated communities ===
- Breitenbush
- Brooks
- Butteville
- Chemawa
- Clear Lake
- Hayesville
- Macleay
- Marion
- McKee
- Mehama
- Middle Grove
- Monitor
- Niagara
- North Howell
- Pratum
- Rosedale
- Saint Louis
- Shaw
- Talbot
- Waconda
- West Stayton

== See also ==
- National Register of Historic Places listings in Marion County, Oregon
