= Mt. Angel, Oregon =

City in Marion County, Oregon

- City
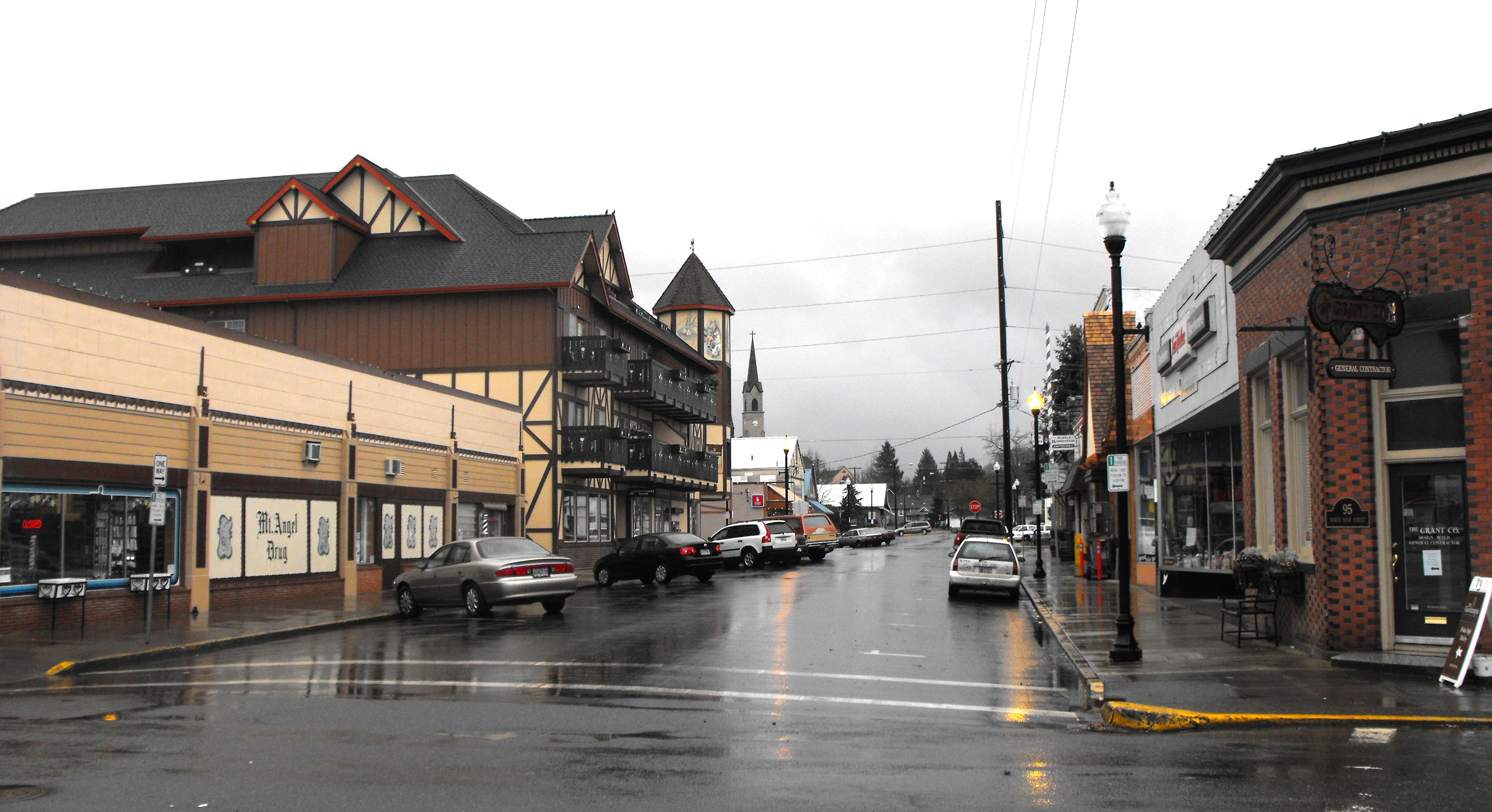
- Charles Street in central Mt. Angel

- Location in Oregon
- Coordinates: 45°04′10″N 122°47′50″W
- County: Marion County
- Incorporated: 1893

Government
  - Mayor: Andrew Otte
  - City Administrator: Eileen Stein

Area
  - Total: 1.14 sq mi (2.94 km^{2})
  - Land: 1.14 sq mi (2.94 km^{2})
  - Water: 0 sq mi (0.00 km^{2})
- Elevation: 177 ft (54 m)

Population (2020)
  - Total: 3,392
  - Density: 2,986.9/sq mi (1,153.24/km^{2})
- Time zone: UTC-8 (Pacific)
  - Summer (DST): UTC-7 (Pacific)
- ZIP Code: 97362
- Area codes: 503, 971
- FIPS code: 41-50150
- GNIS feature ID: 2411176
- Website: www.ci.mt-angel.or.us

Mt. Angel or Mount Angel is a city in Marion County, Oregon, United States. It is 18 miles (29 km) northeast of Salem, Oregon, on Oregon Route 214. The population was 3,392 at the 2020 census, down from 3,748 in 2010. Mt. Angel is part of the Salem Metropolitan Statistical Area.

== History ==
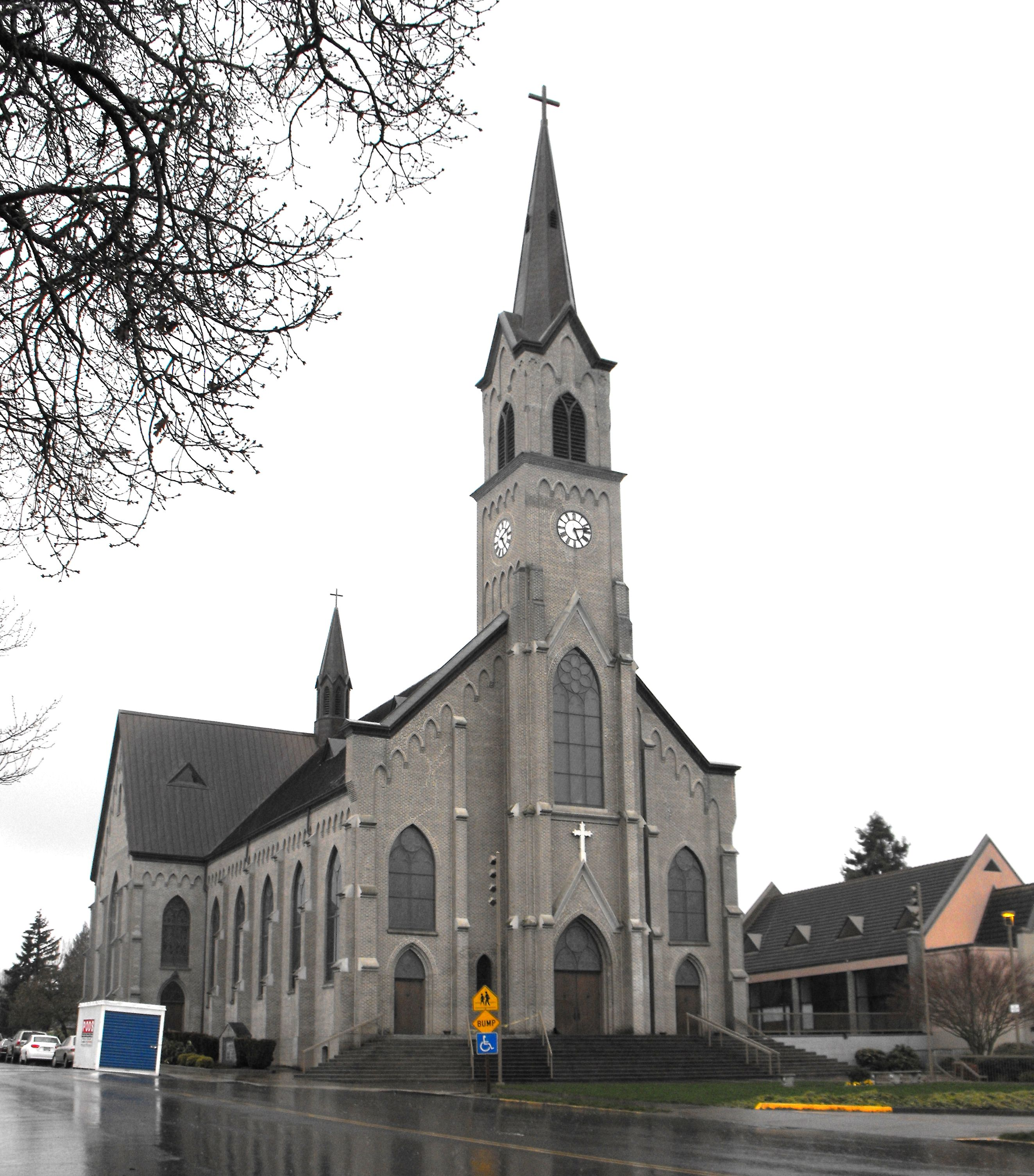
St. Mary's Catholic Church

Mt. Angel was originally settled in 1850 by Benjamin Cleaver, who later planned a townsite which he named Roy. In 1881, a railroad station was established and named Fillmore after a railroad official. The following year, a post office with the name of Roy was established, but neither name was to last.

Rev. Fr. Adelhelm Odermatt, O.S.B., came to Oregon in 1881 with a contingent of Benedictine monks from Engelberg, Switzerland, in order to establish a new American daughter house. After visiting several locations, he found Lone Butte to be the ideal location for a new abbey, and shortly afterwards ministered to several local Roman Catholic parishes, about the same time large numbers of immigrants from Bavaria settled in the area. Due to his efforts, the city, post office and the nearby elevation Lone Butte came to be known as Mount Angel (an English translation of Engelberg) in 1883. He also established Mount Angel Abbey, a Benedictine monastery and school, which was moved permanently to Mt. Angel in 1884.

The city of Mt. Angel was incorporated April 3, 1893. The post office of Saint Benedict, Oregon, was established at the Abbey.

Mount Angel Abbey is still located on Mount Angel. The original Kalapuyan name of the butte is Tapalamaho, which translates to "Mount of Communion." At the request of the Archbishop of Oregon City, the abbey opened Mount Angel Seminary in 1889 for the training of priests. The original wooden buildings at the foot of the butte were destroyed by a fire in the 1890s, and another disastrous fire in 1926 consumed the second monastery, an imposing five-story edifice of black basalt at the top of the butte. The current monastery building was completed in 1928, and subsequent structures followed, including a library built by Finnish architect Alvar Aalto in 1970. A bell tower was added to the abbey church in 2007 which contains eight bells, one of which is the largest swinging bell in the Pacific Northwest.

The Benedictine Sisters of Mt. Angel (the Queen of Angels Monastery) were founded in 1882 and have been serving the Willamette Valley ever since. They teach in schools and parishes; work as counselors, chaplains, and pastoral associates; they are artisans, cooks, and gardeners. As a community, the Benedictine Sisters sponsor two ministries, the Shalom Prayer Center and the St. Joseph Shelter.

== Geography ==
Mt. Angel is in northwestern Marion County along Oregon Route 214, which leads south 4.5 miles (7.2 km) to Silverton and northwest 7 miles (11 km) to Woodburn. Salem, the state capital, is 18 miles (29 km) to the southwest via State Routes 214 and 213.

According to the U.S. Census Bureau, the city of Mt. Angel has a total area of 1.14 square miles (2.95 km^{2}), all land. It is in the Pudding River watershed.

The town sits on the Gales Creek/Mount Angel lineament and on the Mount Angel Fault, a northwest-trending geophysical structural zone. Activity along the fault caused the 1993 Scotts Mills earthquake, which significantly damaged various structures in the town, in particular the parish church.

=== Climate ===
This region experiences warm (but not hot) and dry summers, with no average monthly temperatures above 71.6 °F (22.0 °C). According to the Köppen Climate Classification system, Mt. Angel has a warm-summer Mediterranean climate, abbreviated Csb on climate maps.

== Demographics ==
Historical population
Census	Pop.	Note	%±
1900	537		—
1910	545		1.5%
1920	986		80.9%
1930	979		−0.7%
1940	1,032		5.4%
1950	1,315		27.4%
1960	1,428		8.6%
1970	1,973		38.2%
1980	2,876		45.8%
1990	2,778		−3.4%
2000	3,121		12.3%
2010	3,748		20.1%
2020	3,392		−9.5%
U.S. Decennial Census

=== 2010 census ===
As of the census of 2010, there were 3,748 people, 1,505 households, and 724 families residing in the city. The population density was 2,882.5 inhabitants per square mile (1,112.9/km^{2}). There were 1,282 housing units at an average density of 1,124.6 per square mile (434.2/km^{2}). The racial makeup of the city was 82.6% White, 0.5% African American, 1.0% Native American, 0.5% Asian, 12.1% from other races, and 3.3% from two or more races. Hispanic or Latino of any race were 26.1% of the population.

There were 1,505 households, of which 33.9% had children under the age of 18 living with them, 44.4% were married couples living together, 10.3% had a female householder with no husband present, 4.0% had a male householder with no wife present, and 41.3% were non-families. 37.1% of all households were made up of individuals, and 27.2% had someone living alone who was 65 years of age or older. The average household size was 2.56 and the average family size was 3.44.

The median age in the city was 37.1 years. 27% of residents were under the age of 18; 8.3% were between the ages of 18 and 24; 23.7% were from 25 to 44; 20% were from 45 to 64; and 20.9% were 65 years of age or older. The gender makeup of the city was 48.3% male and 51.7% female.

=== 2000 census ===
As of the census of 2000, there were 3,121 people, 1,059 households, and 661 families residing in the city. The population density was 3,264.3 inhabitants per square mile (1,260.4/km^{2}). There were 1,124 housing units at an average density of 1,175.6 per square mile (453.9/km^{2}). The racial makeup of the city was 75.65% White, 0.45% African American, 0.93% Native American, 0.19% Asian, 0.10% Pacific Islander, 17.85% from other races, and 4.84% from two or more races. Hispanic or Latino of any race were 27.84% of the population.

There were 1,059 households, out of which 35.5% had children under the age of 18 living with them, 48.0% were married couples living together, 10.8% had a female householder with no husband present, and 37.5% were non-families. 33.1% of all households were made up of individuals, and 20.5% had someone living alone who was 65 years of age or older. The average household size was 2.75 and the average family size was 3.54.

In the city, the population was spread out, with 30.2% under the age of 18, 8.5% from 18 to 24, 25.1% from 25 to 44, 17.9% from 45 to 64, and 18.2% who were 65 years of age or older. The median age was 34 years. For every 100 females, there were 92.5 males. For every 100 females age 18 and over, there were 85.3 males.

The median income for a household in the city was $36,293, and the median income for a family was $45,650. Males had a median income of $33,523 versus $21,442 for females. The per capita income for the city was $15,535. About 10.3% of families and 16.3% of the population were below the poverty line, including 16.6% of those under age 18 and 20.2% of those age 65 or over.

== Economy ==
As of 2000, the five largest employers in Mt. Angel were Wilco, Providence Benedictine Nursing Center, Mt. Angel Towers, Highland Laboratories, and the Mt. Angel School District.

== Arts and culture ==
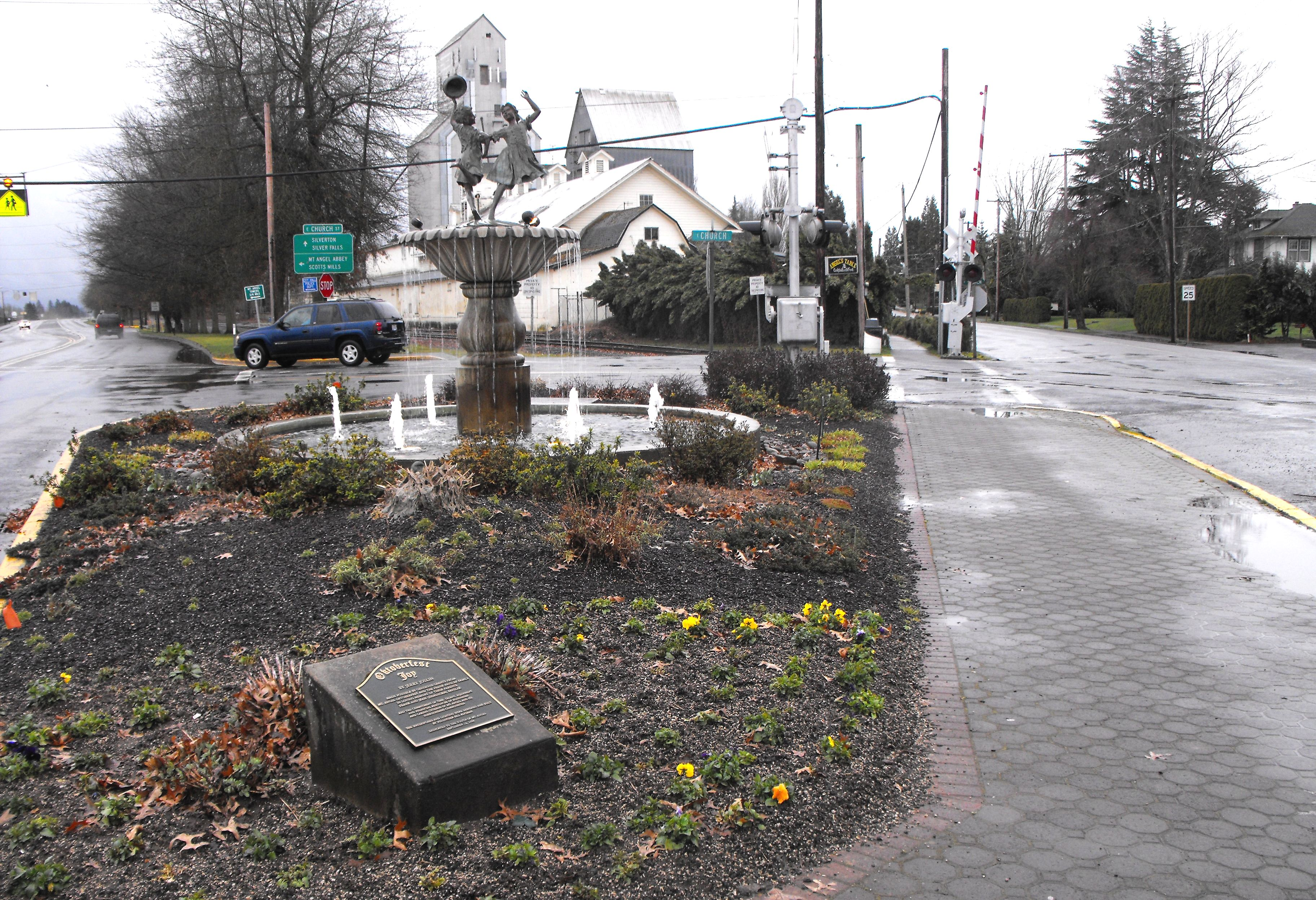
Dancing children fountain in central crossroad of Mt. Angel. Former Wilco grain elevator in the background.

=== Annual cultural events ===
Mt. Angel is known for its annual Oktoberfest. The Mt. Angel Oktoberfest is the largest of its kind in the Pacific Northwest. Attendance grew from 39,000 in its first year, 1966, to 375,000 by the late 1980s. The Oktoberfest features beer and wine gardens, sports tournaments and races, arts and crafts exhibits, a farmers market, community dinners featuring sausage and sauerkraut, and a wide assortment of food, games, and entertainment. Another annual event is Mt. Angel Volksfest, formerly known as Mt. Angel Wurstfest.

=== Museums and other points of interest ===
Mt. Angel is home to the historic Queen of Angels Monastery, operated by the Benedictine Sisters of Mt. Angel, and the 1912 Saint Mary Catholic Church, both of which are listed on the National Register of Historic Places (NRHP). Windischar's General Blacksmith Shop is another NRHP-listed structure in the city.

In March 2006, the city announced plans to build a 49-foot (15 m) glockenspiel. Completed in time for Oktoberfest 2006, the glockenspiel is the largest in the United States. Located on the corner of Charles and Garfield streets, the four-story-tall glockenspiel is part of the Edelweiss Village Building.

== Education ==
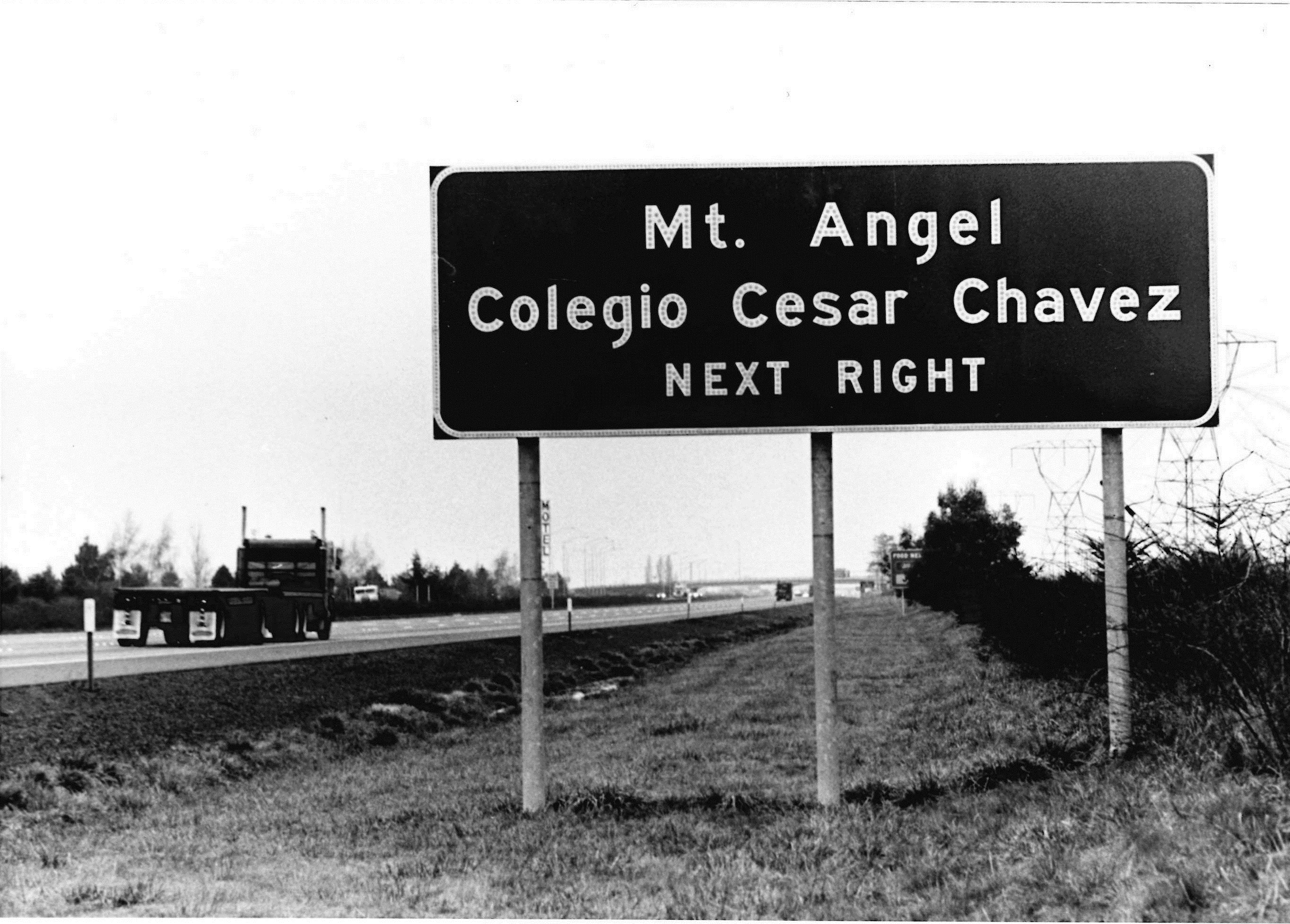
Road sign to Colegio Cesar Chavez

Mt. Angel is served by the three-school Mt. Angel School District, which includes John F. Kennedy High School.

Colegio César Chávez was a college-without-walls program that existed in Mt. Angel from 1973 until 1983. At the time, the Colegio was the only four-year Latino college in the country. The college was supported by Chicano activist Cesar Chavez, who himself visited the college on two occasions. In 1978, the college graduated more Mexican American students than Oregon State University and University of Oregon combined. Cipriano Ferrel, who would later found the Oregon farmworker's union Pineros y Campesinos Unidos del Noroeste, graduated from Colegio Cesar Chavez. In the mid-1980s, the former Colegio grounds and building were purchased by a private buyer and donated to the Benedictine sisters. The Benedictine sisters now operate St. Joseph Shelter in the former Colegio building and dorms.

== Media ==
Mt. Angel is served by the weekly Silverton Appeal Tribune newspaper, which is published on Wednesdays by the Statesman Journal, the monthly publications Our Town and Our Town Life, and by the weekly Woodburn Independent.

== Infrastructure ==
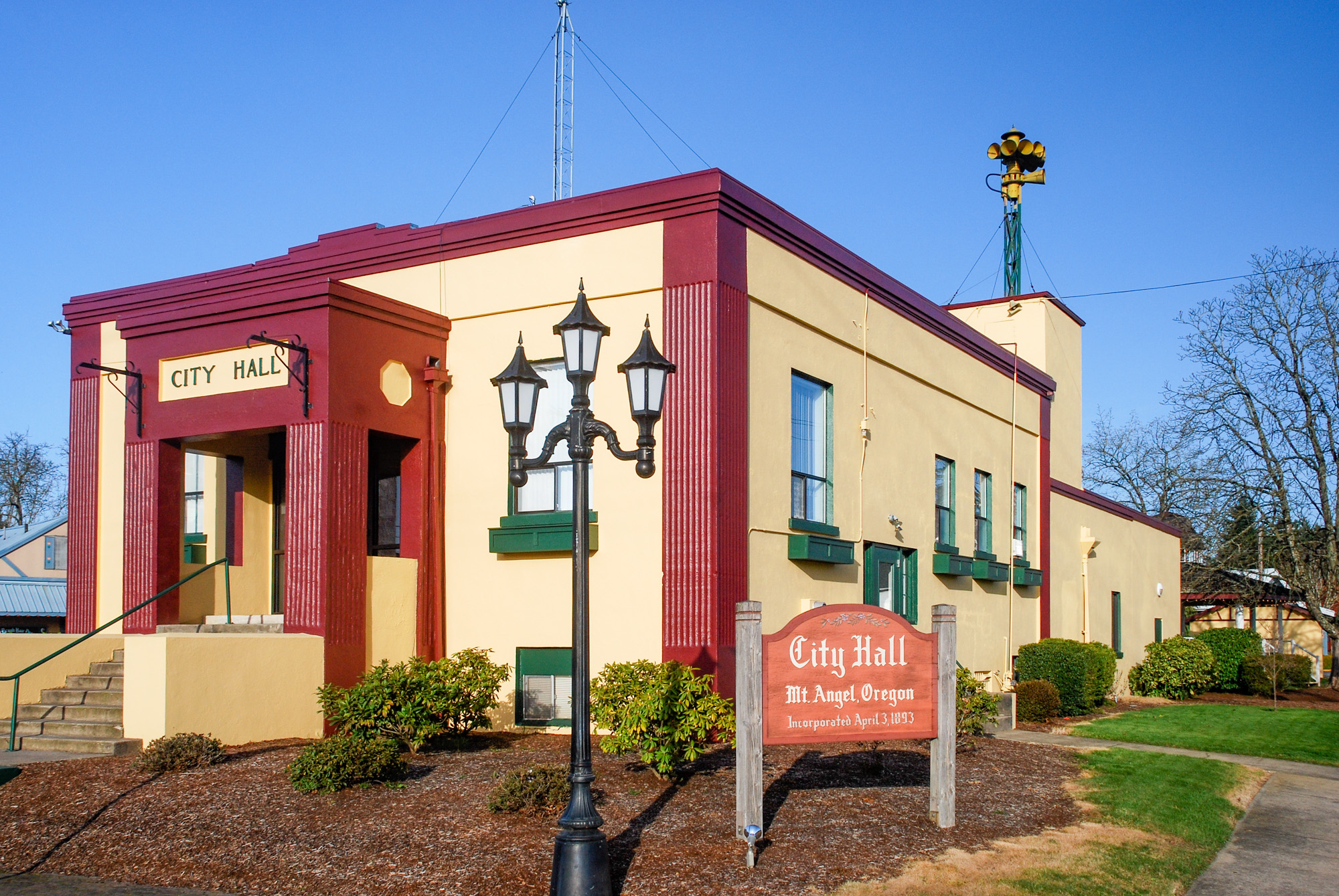
Mt. Angel City Hall

=== Transportation ===
==== Highway ====
Mt. Angel is on Oregon Route 214. The closest major highway, Interstate 5, is 10 miles (16 km) to the west.

==== Rail ====
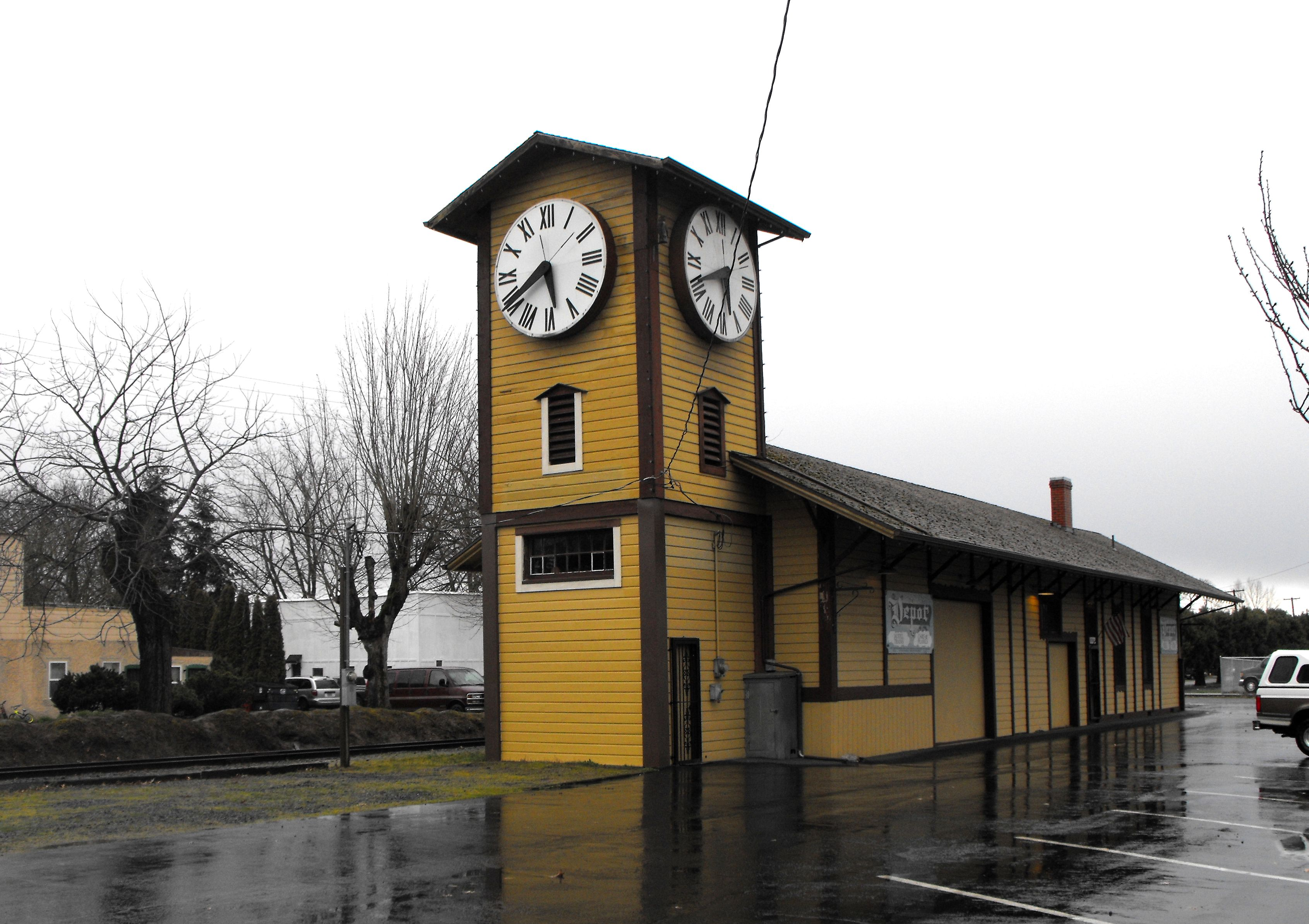
Mt. Angel railway depot

The Willamette Valley Railway serves Mt. Angel.

==== Air ====
The closest airport is Aurora State Airport in Aurora.

=== Utilities ===
Water and wastewater treatment are provided by the City of Mt. Angel. Natural gas is provided by NW Natural and electricity is provided by Portland General Electric.

=== Healthcare ===
The closest hospital is Silverton Hospital, 4 miles (6 km) away in Silverton.

== In popular culture ==
- Mt. Angel was the setting (dubbed Mt. Angel, Massachusetts) for the 1973 ABC television film Isn't It Shocking?
- In S.M. Stirling's Emberverse series, Mt. Angel and its Benedictine monastic orders are the nucleus of a post-apocalyptic community that survives "The Change," which pushes technology back to a medieval level.
