= Macleay, Oregon =

Unincorporated community in Oregon, United States

Coordinates: 44°54′28″N 122°53′14″W

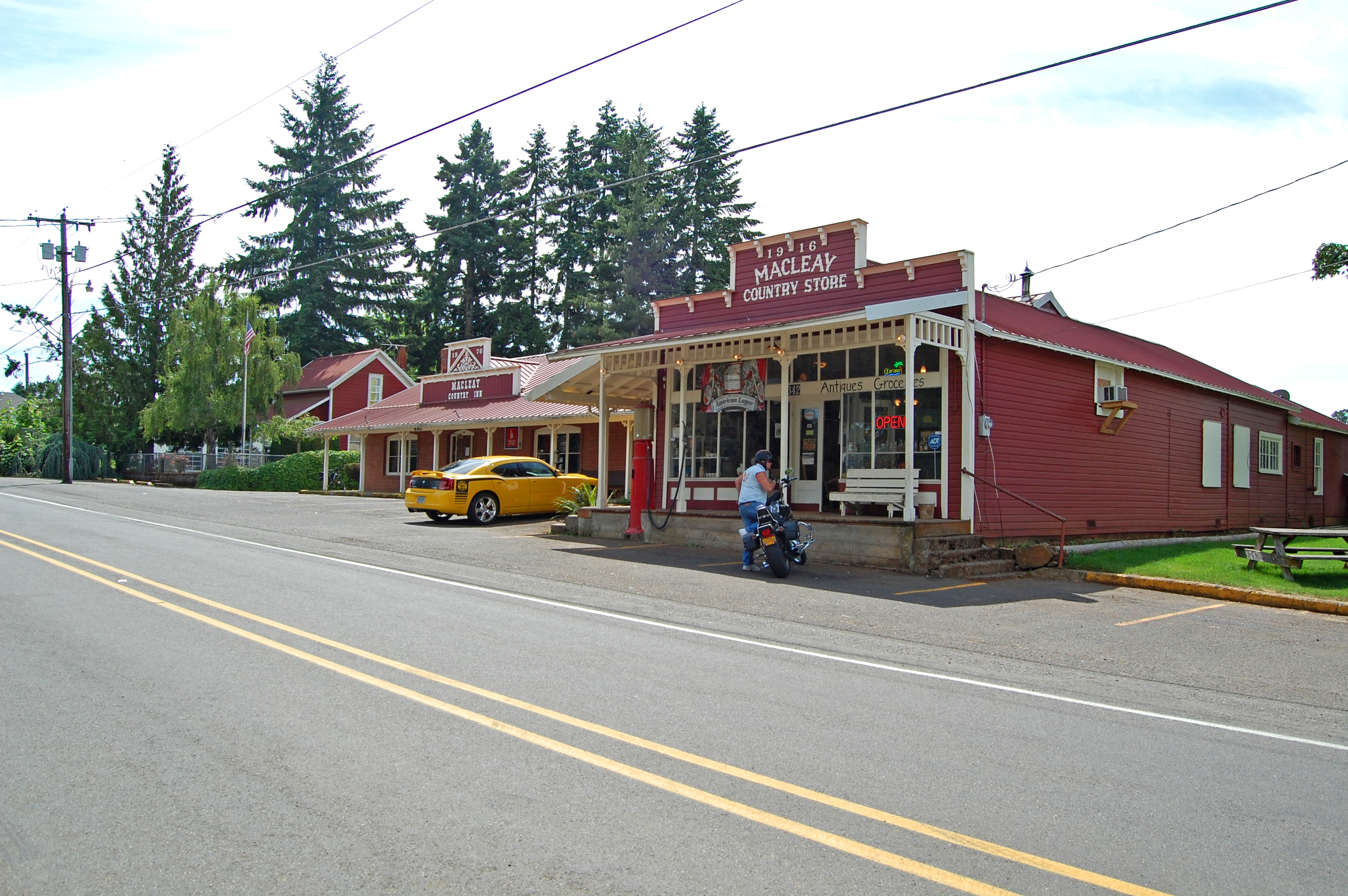
Country Store in Macleay

Macleay is an unincorporated community in Marion County, Oregon, United States. It is about nine miles east of downtown Salem in the Waldo Hills near the Little Pudding River.

This locale was originally named "Stipp" for local settler John L. Stipp, whose land claim was just west of present-day Macleay. Stipp donated the land for what is now known as the Stipp Memorial Cemetery. Stipp post office was established in 1880, and the name changed to "Macleay" in 1882. Donald Macleay was a prominent merchant of Portland, and along with fellow Scot William Reid, was one of the investors in the narrow-gauge Oregonian Railway Company, which was built through the area. Macleay gave money to build a schoolhouse in the Stipp area, near the new railroad station, so the post office was renamed in his honor. Macleay was platted in 1884. Macleay post office ran until 1939.

Ownership of the railroad line passed on to Southern Pacific and today it is owned by Union Pacific. The Macleay Country Store has been in operation since 1916. The community also has an active Grange hall, a fire station, and the former school currently serves as a church.

== See also ==
For more on Donald Macleay:

- Balch Creek
- Forest Park
