= Danford Balch =

- Born: November 29, 1811; Colrain, Massachusetts, United States
- Died: October 17, 1859; Portland, Oregon, United States
- Occupation(s): Settler, farmer
- Known for: Murdering his son-in-law, Mortimer Stump
- Spouse: Mary Jane Balch
- Children: Anna Balch Stump and eight others

Danford Balch (November 29, 1811 – October 17, 1859) (alternate spelling Danforth) was a mid-19th-century settler in what later became the Willamette Heights neighborhood of Portland in the U.S. state of Oregon. He was born on November 29, 1811, in Colrain, Massachusetts, but spent his early years in Onondaga County, New York. In 1850, Balch moved west to Portland, and settled on a donation land claim of about 346 acres (140 ha) with his wife, Mary Jane, and nine children. A commemorative stone at Northwest 30th Avenue and Upshur Street marks the spot of the Balch homesite. Mortimer Stump, a 26 year old man, had been hired to work on the Balch property. His family's property was in the area of St. Johns on the east side of the Willamette River.

Nine years later, Balch was convicted of murdering Mortimer Stump, who had eloped with and married Balch's oldest child, Anna (15), against her father's wishes. In front of witnesses, Balch killed Stump with a shotgun as Mortimer and Anna boarded the Stark Street Ferry to cross the Willamette River. While awaiting trial, Balch and three others escaped to a hideout in the woods near his farm. Apprehended by James Lappeus, the city marshal, Balch was tried and convicted in August and hanged before a crowd of several hundred onlookers on October 17, 1859. The hanging was the first legal one in the city.

According to a news article citing Metsker's Atlas of Multnomah County, the Balch property ran from "Vaughn Street near then-named St. Helens Boulevard in the northwest corner, south of Cornell Road in the southwest corner, and directly east downhill to the vicinity of 22nd Avenue." Balch's land included what later became Macleay Park (now part of Forest Park), through which runs Balch Creek. Later United States Senator, and scandal plagued attorney, John H. Mitchell served as trustee of Balch's property and benefited financially from this role.
