= Witch's Castle =

Witch's Castle may refer to:

- Stone House (Portland, Oregon), a derelict structure, formerly a restroom, in Portland, Oregon's Forest Park commonly referred to as Witch's Castle
- The Three Witches, a South Korean television series
