= Balch Creek =

Tributary of Willamette River in Oregon, United States

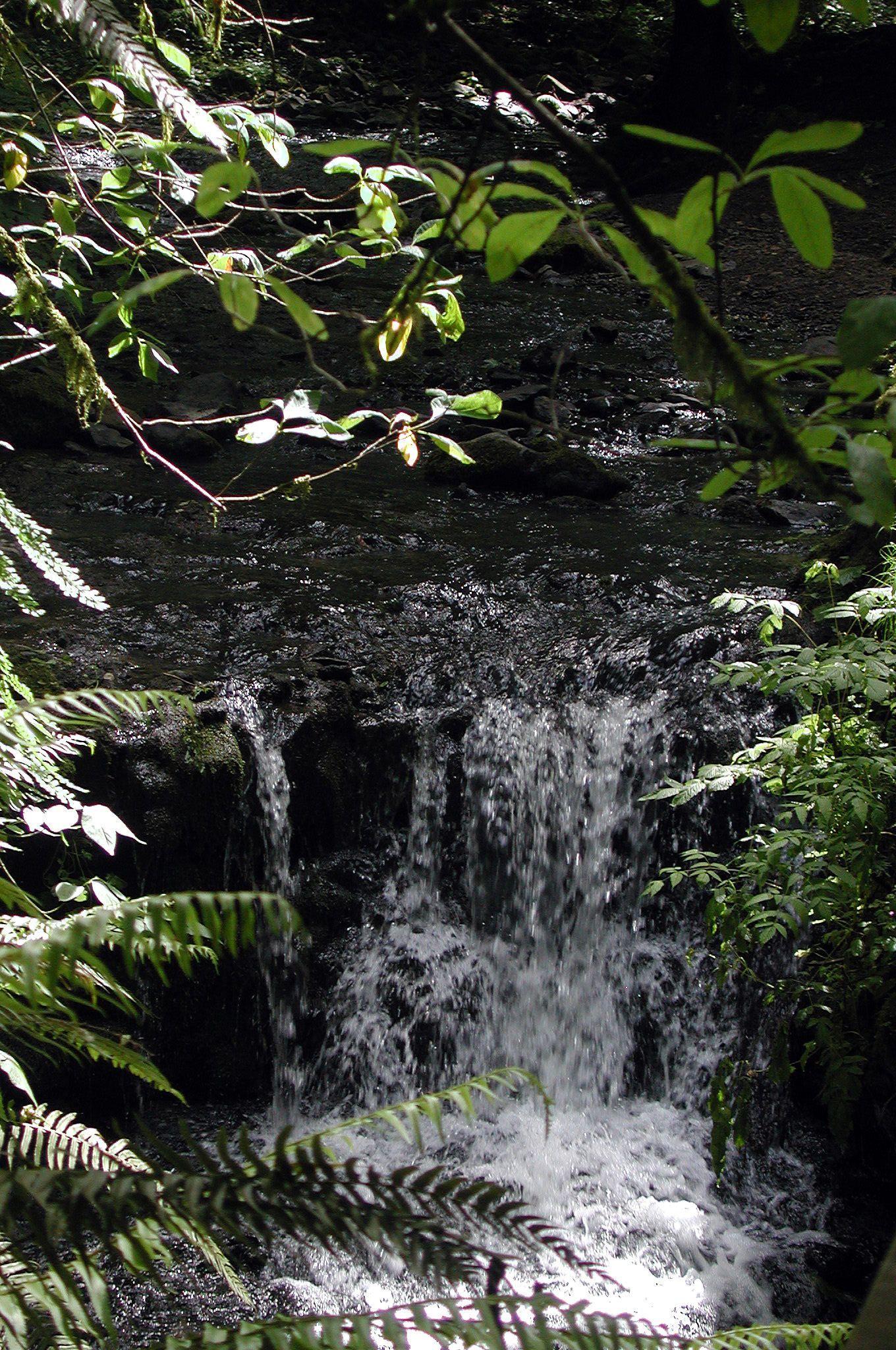
- Waterfall in Macleay Park

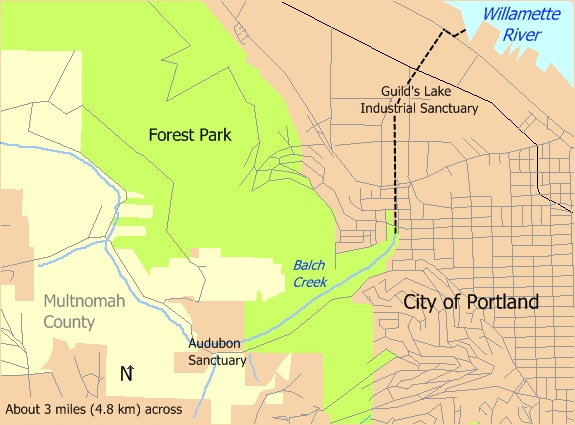
- Balch Creek in Portland and unincorporated Multnomah County. Dashed black line shows stream course through storm sewer.

- Location of the mouth of Balch Creek in Oregon
- Etymology: Danford Balch, early settler

Location
- Country: United States
- State: Oregon
- County: Multnomah

Physical characteristics
- Source: Tualatin Mountains (West Hills)
  - location: Portland, Multnomah County, Oregon
  - coordinates: 45°32′34″N 122°45′35″W
  - elevation: 1,116 ft (340 m)
- Mouth: Willamette River
  - location: Portland, Multnomah County, Oregon
  - coordinates: 45°32′16″N 122°42′41″W
  - elevation: 46 ft (14 m)
- Length: 3.5 mi (5.6 km)
- Basin size: 3.5 sq mi (9.1 km^{2})
- Discharge
  - location: Lower Macleay Park
  - average: 1.05 cu ft/s (0.030 m^{3}/s)
  - minimum: 0 cu ft/s (0 m^{3}/s)
  - maximum: 73 cu ft/s (2.1 m^{3}/s)

Balch Creek is a 3.5-mile (5.6 km) tributary of the Willamette River in the U.S. state of Oregon. Beginning at the crest of the Tualatin Mountains (West Hills), the creek flows generally east down a canyon along Northwest Cornell Road in unincorporated Multnomah County and through the Macleay Park section of Forest Park, a large municipal park in Portland. At the lower end of the park, the stream enters a pipe and remains underground until reaching the river. Danford Balch, after whom the creek is named, settled a land claim along the creek in the mid-19th century. After murdering his son-in-law, he became the first person legally hanged in Oregon.

Basalt, mostly covered by silt in the uplands and sediment in the lowlands, underlies the Balch Creek watershed. The upper part of the watershed includes private residential land, the Audubon Society of Portland nature sanctuary, and part of Forest Park. Mixed conifer forest of Coast Douglas-fir, western redcedar, and western hemlock with a well-developed understory of shrubs and flowering plants is the natural vegetation. Sixty-two species of mammals and more than 112 species of birds use Forest Park. A small population of coastal cutthroat trout resides in the stream, which in 2005 was the only major water body in Portland that met state standards for bacteria, temperature, and dissolved oxygen.

Although nature reserves cover much of the upper and middle parts of the watershed, industrial sites dominate the lower part. Historic Guild's Lake occupied part of the lower watershed through the 19th century, and in 1905 city officials held the Lewis and Clark Centennial Exposition there on an artificial island. After the exposition, developers converted the lake and its surrounds to industrial use, and in 2001 the Portland City Council declared the site to be an "industrial sanctuary".

== Course ==
Balch Creek begins in the Forest Park neighborhood in unincorporated Multnomah County near the intersection of Northwest Skyline Boulevard and Northwest Thompson Road at the crest of the West Hills. It flows generally east about 3.5 miles (5.6 km) to its confluence with the Willamette River, a major tributary of the Columbia River. The creek drops from 1,116 feet (340 m) above sea level at its source to 46 feet (14 m) at its mouth, a total of 1,070 feet (330 m). Most of this occurs in the first 2.5 miles (4.0 km). In the hills, the stream gradient (slope) generally ranges from 15 to 30 percent interspersed with sections of less than 15 percent along the middle reaches.

From its source, the creek runs east on private property near Forest Park, a large municipal park in Portland, before turning briefly south about 3 miles (5 km) from the mouth. Soon thereafter, the stream receives an unnamed tributary on the right bank and turns southeast on private property along Northwest Cornell Road. It enters the city and the Audubon Society of Portland simultaneously about 2 miles (3 km) from the mouth, receives two more unnamed tributaries on the right, and flows northeast, entering the part of Forest Park known as Macleay Park.

For about 0.25 miles (0.40 km) the creek parallels Wildwood Trail, the main hiking trail in Forest Park, until reaching a former public restroom known as the Stone House. From here Balch Creek runs beside the Lower Macleay Trail, another hiking trail, for about 0.8 miles (1.3 km). Near Northwest Thurman Street, roughly 1 mile (1.6 km) from the mouth, the creek flows through a trash rack into an 84-inch (210 cm) diameter storm sewer. City workers first diverted the creek into the pipe in the early 20th century. The water empties into the Willamette River in the city's Northwest Industrial neighborhood at Outfall 17. About 10 miles (16 km) below this outfall, the Willamette enters the Columbia River.

=== Discharge ===
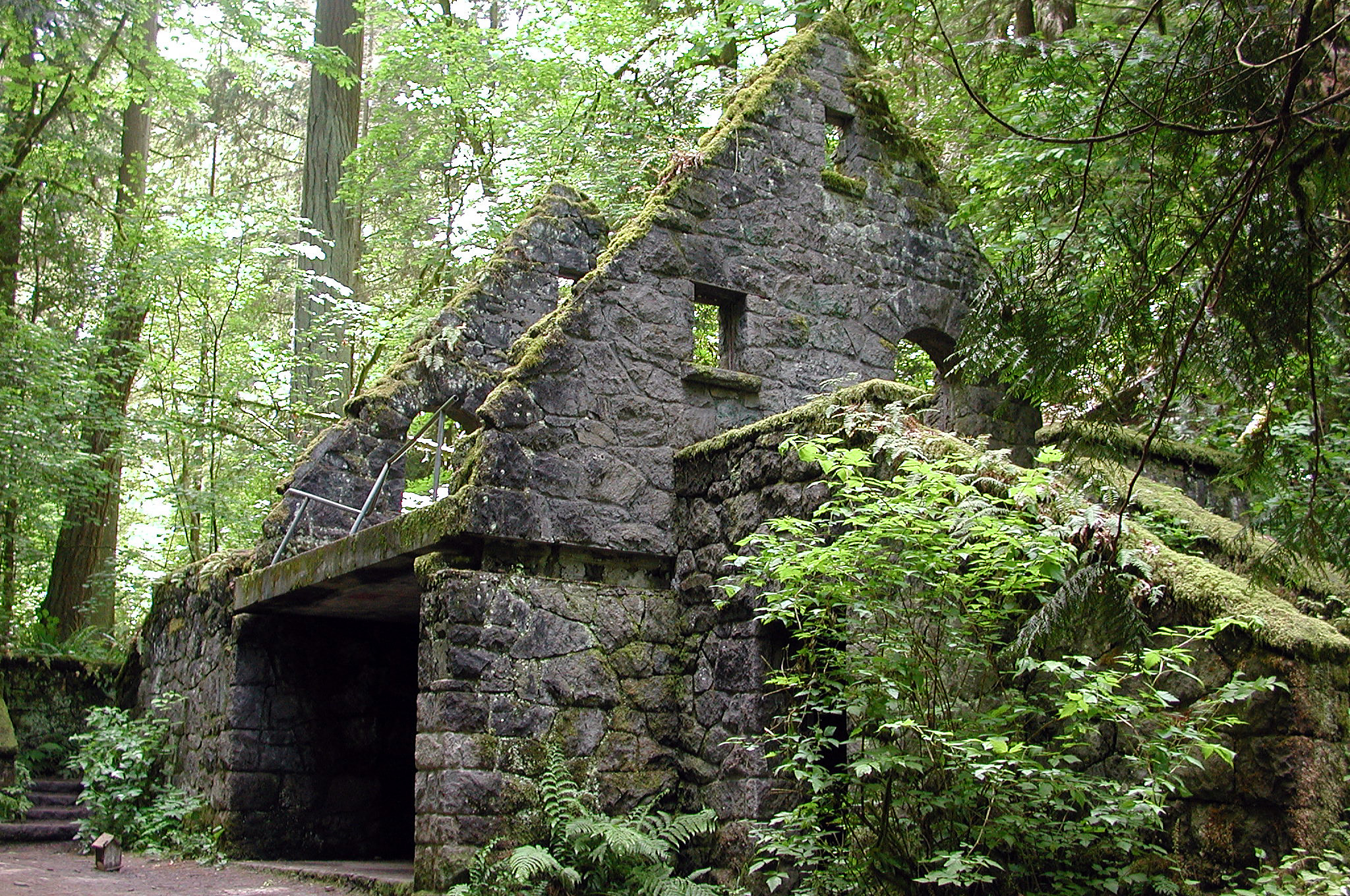
The federal Works Progress Administration built this stone structure near Balch Creek in the 1930s. The city maintained it as a public restroom until 1962.

The Bureau of Environmental Services (BES) of the city of Portland monitored the flow of Balch Creek from June 1996 through September 2002 at a site, Node ABB857, where the stream leaves the surface and enters a storm sewer in Macleay Park. BES reported an average summer flow of 0.2 cubic feet per second (0.0057 m^{3}/s), a maximum of 60 cubic feet per second (1.7 m^{3}/s), and a minimum of 0. The average flow in winter was 1.9 cubic feet per second (0.054 m^{3}/s), with a maximum of 73 cubic feet per second (2.1 m^{3}/s) and a minimum of 0.

Measurements taken during an individual spring, from mid-May to mid-July 2002, showed the flow starting at about 2.5 cubic feet per second (0.071 m^{3}/s) and dwindling to 0 by early June. The flow through June depended partly on the weather; the highest flow, 4.5 cubic feet per second (0.13 m^{3}/s), occurred after a rain. Measurements taken during an individual autumn, late August to late December 2001, were close to zero until November. The largest flows during that season, 19.2 cubic feet per second (0.54 m^{3}/s), occurred after many days of rain.

== Geology ==
Solidified lava from Grande Ronde members of the Columbia River Basalt Group underlies the Balch Creek watershed. About 16 million years ago during the Middle Miocene, the Columbia River ran through a lowland south of its modern channel. Eruptions from linear vents in eastern Oregon and Washington flowed down this channel through what later became the Willamette Valley. These flows, some of which reached the Pacific Ocean, occurred between 16.5 and 15.6 million years ago and covered almost 60,000 square miles (160,000 km^{2}). Geologists have identified several basalt flows in the West Hills, where they underlie the steepest slopes of Forest Park and form the columned rocks visible in parts of Balch Creek Canyon. Wind-deposited silts, unstable when wet, later covered most of the lava. Stream bank instability and siltation are common, and the threat of landslides has discouraged urban development in the hills.

Between 19,000 and 15,000 years ago, cataclysmic ice age events known as the Missoula Floods or Bretz Floods originating in the Clark Fork region of northern Idaho inundated the Columbia River basin many times. These floods deposited huge amounts of debris and sediment and created new floodplains in the Willamette Valley. From then until the 19th century, the lower Balch Creek watershed consisted of swampy marshlands and shallow semi-permanent lakes such as historic Guild's Lake. The final 1 mile (1.6 km) or so of historic Balch Creek flowed across this floodplain.

== History ==
=== Names ===
Multnomah County is named for Native Americans who lived in the area before settlement by non-indigenous people in the 19th century. Members of the Multnomah tribe of the Chinookan people lived on Sauvie Island in the Willamette River and on the mainland across from the island, downstream from the mouth of Balch Creek. Much of the area near the lower creek was swampy, and was not favored by the Multnomah. By the 1830s, diseases carried by white explorers and traders reduced the native population by up to 90 percent in the lower Columbia basin.

Historic Guild's Lake, in the lower Balch Creek watershed near the Willamette River, was named for Peter Guild (pronounced guile), one of the first European American settlers in the area. In 1847, he acquired nearly 600 acres (2.4 km^{2}) of the watershed through a donation land claim. Although variations in the spelling of Guild's Lake occur in historic newspapers, maps, and other documents, Guild's Lake has been the preferred form since the beginning of the 20th century.

The creek is named for Danford Balch, who settled a 346-acre (1.40 km^{2}) donation land claim upstream of the Guild property in 1850. After a man from a neighboring family eloped with a Balch daughter, Balch killed him with a shotgun. On October 17, 1859, at a public gallows he became the first person to be hanged by the State of Oregon.

Macleay Park takes its name from Donald Macleay, a Portland merchant and real-estate developer who acquired what had been the Balch property. In 1897, he donated the land for a park on condition that the city provide transport to the park for hospital patients and build paths wide enough for wheelchairs.

=== Early water supply ===
Balch Creek was one of Portland's sources of drinking water in the mid-19th century. Stephen Coffin and Finice Caruthers, two early Portland entrepreneurs, established the first public water supply for the city in 1857 by piping water from Caruthers Creek in southwest Portland through round fir logs with 2.5-inch (6.4 cm) holes bored in them. In the 1860s, the Portland Water Company, which had acquired the existing business, added water from Balch Creek to the system. It was piped to a wooden reservoir at Alder and Pacific streets. Water shortages and pollution led to a shift in the water supply from sources within the city to the Bull Run River in the Cascade Range. It began supplying most of Portland's drinking water in 1895.

=== Industry ===
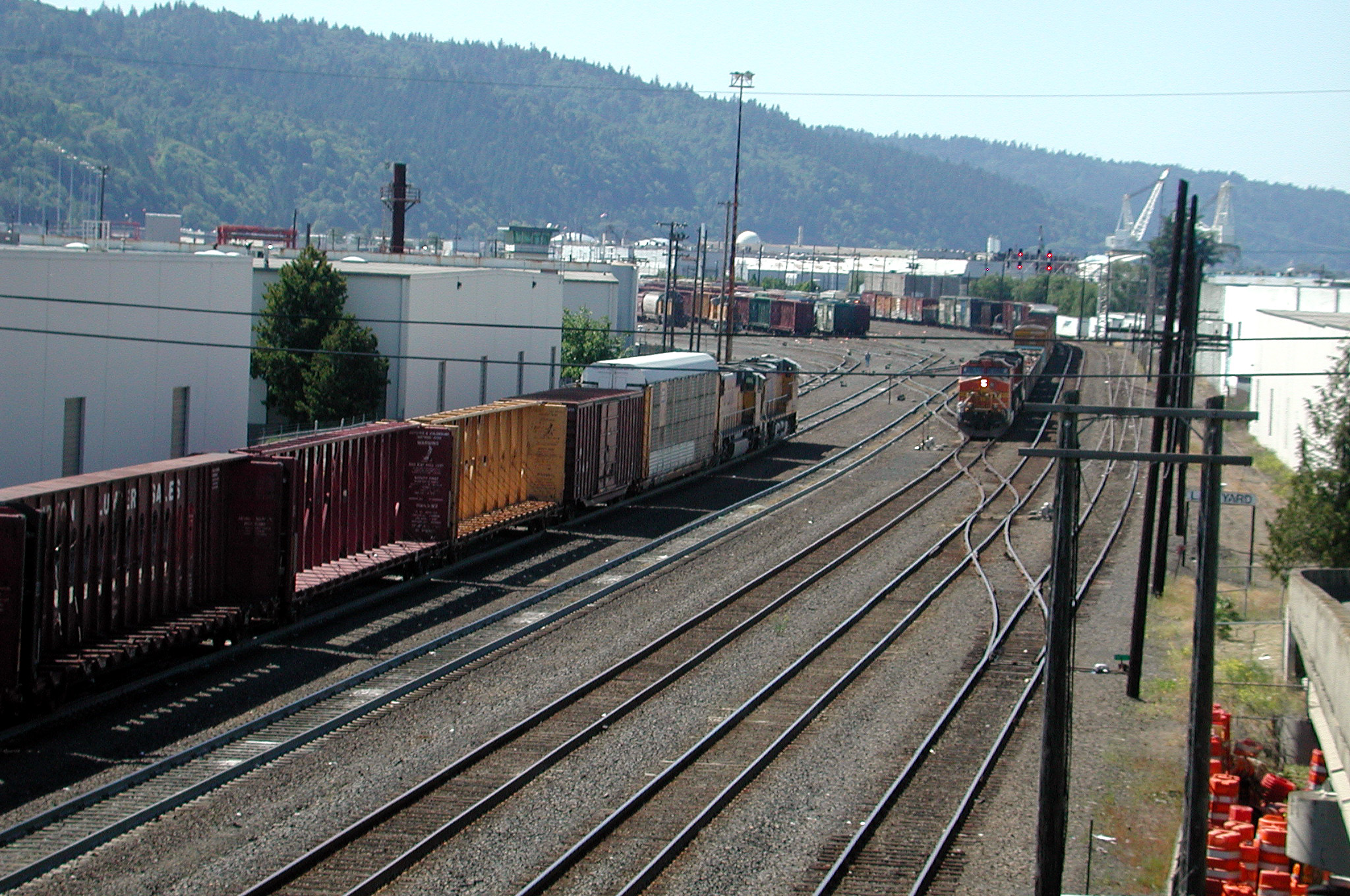
Two trains pass one another in the Lakeyard rail yard in the lower Balch Creek watershed. The yard, near river terminals and freight terminals, is part of the Guild's Lake Industrial Sanctuary.

One of the first industries in the Guild's Lake area was a sawmill built in the 1880s. Although large parts of the land remained undeveloped until the early 20th century, lumber mills, grain storage structures, railroads, and docks appeared along the waterfront. The Guild's Lake Rail Yard, built by the Northern Pacific Railway in the 1880s, became an important switching yard for trains.

In 1905, the Lewis and Clark Centennial Exposition, held on an artificial island in Guild's Lake, helped spur growth in the area. After the exposition ended, developers filled the lake and its surrounds with soil sluiced from parts of the Balch Creek watershed in the West Hills above the floodplain or dredged from the Willamette River. Civic leaders promoted the Guild's Lake area as a good place for industry, and by the mid-1920s the lake was gone. The USGS places historic Guild's Lake at coordinates 45.5470620°N 122.7206530°W at an elevation of 33 feet (10 m) above sea level between what later became Northwest Saint Helens Road and Northwest Yeon Street, slightly west of Northwest 35th Avenue in the Northwest Industrial district of Portland.

Between the 1890s and the 1930s, channel-deepening in the Willamette River improved the city's status as a deep-water seaport, as did completion in 1914 of a port terminal. Guild's Lake, close to highways as well as marine and rail terminals, became the most important industrial area in Portland. After World War II, chemical and petroleum processing and storage, metals manufacturing, and other large industries expanded in the area. In 2001, the Portland City Council adopted the Guild's Lake Industrial Sanctuary Plan aimed at protecting the area's "long-term economic viability as an industrial district."

=== Renaming attempt ===
On June 27, 2025, the Oregon Geographic Names Board rejected an attempt to rename Balch Creek. Local resident Nancy Helmsworth proposed renaming it to Kulla Kulla Creek—the Chinook word for bird—to honor local indigenous tribes and remove association with Danford Balch due to the fact that he was a convicted criminal. Another local resident, Mike Taylor, testified against the renaming and suggested new Chinook names could be used for unnamed featured throughout the park. The board voted 12–9 against the renaming.

== Watershed ==
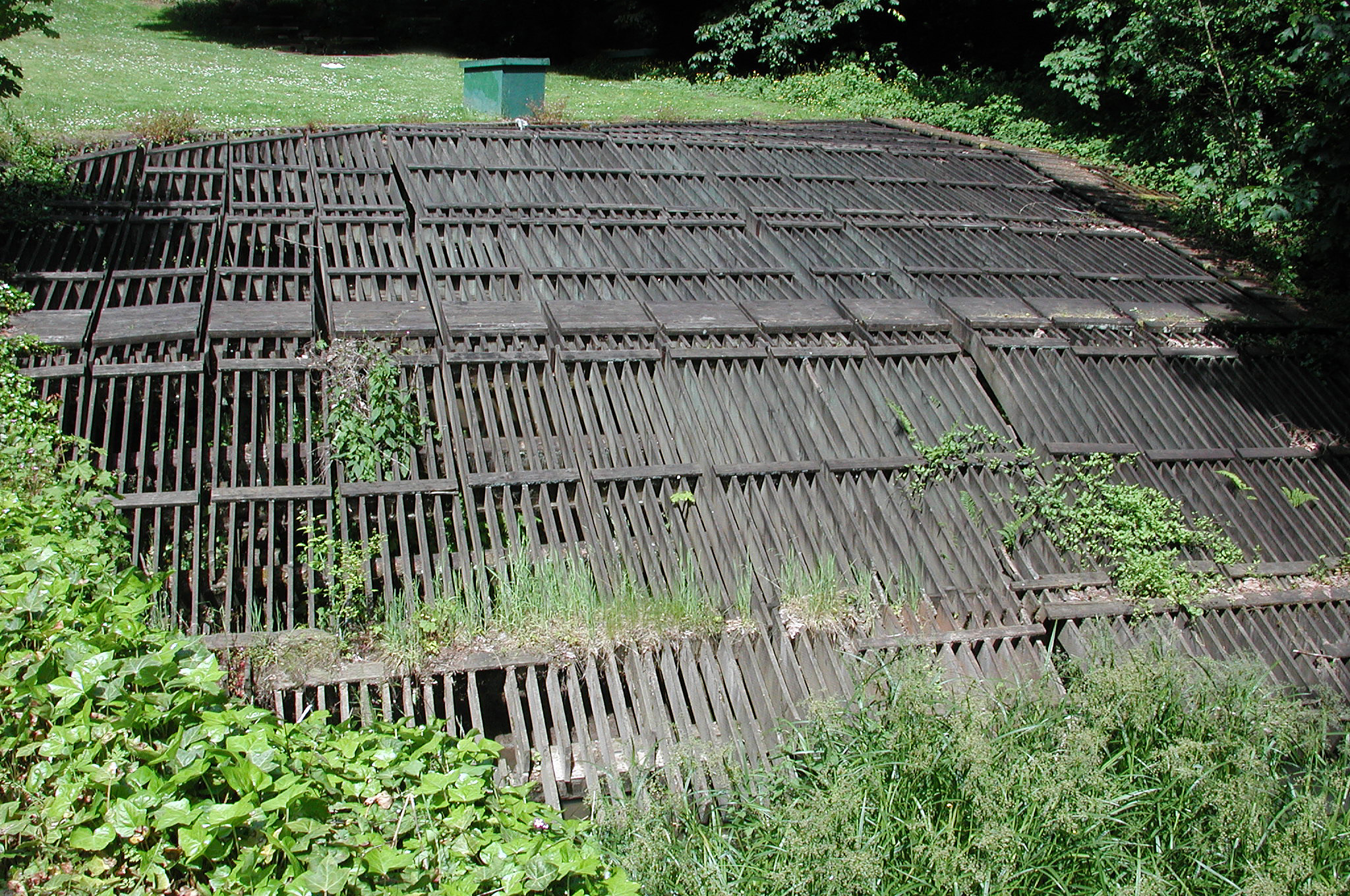
The creek enters a Portland storm sewer through this wooden rack near Northwest Thurman Street.

The Balch Creek watershed consists of 2,248 acres (910 ha), equal to 3.5 square miles (9.1 km^{2}). About 27 percent is zoned for parks and other open space, and about 20 percent is zoned for heavy industry near the Willamette River. Multnomah County has jurisdiction over 586 acres (237 ha), about a quarter of the watershed. Lands zoned for residential farms and forests occupy about 13 percent of the total, mostly along the watershed's western edge. A mixture of residential, commercial, and other designations make up smaller segments. About 1,600 people lived in the Balch Creek watershed in 2000, and about 6,700 people worked there. Nearby watersheds include those of other small streams flowing directly into the Willamette along the east flank of the West Hills. The city refers to these as the Johnson-Nicolai subwatershed to the southeast, and the Kittredge and Salzman subwatersheds to the northwest.

Rainfall in the watershed from 1977 to 2002 averaged about 40 inches (1,000 mm) per year. About 30 inches (760 mm) of the total fell from November through April, and about 10 inches (250 mm) fell from May through October. Minor flooding has occurred near the trash rack—where the creek enters a pipe—and has caused occasional basement flooding along nearby streets. City officials are studying the rack design with a view to alterations by 2017.

=== Flora ===
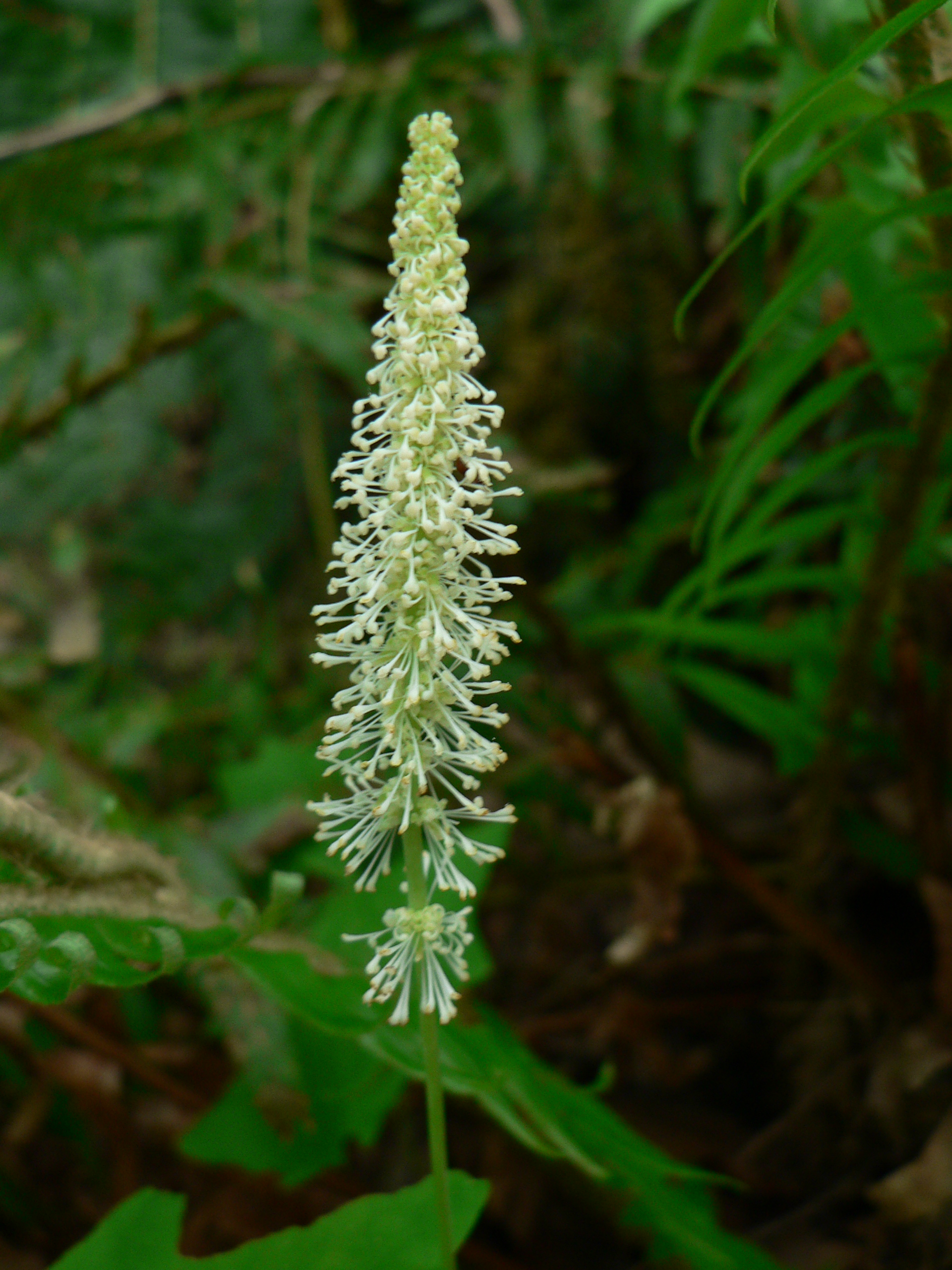
Vanilla leaf forms part of the forest understory in the Balch Creek watershed.

The watershed lies partly in the Coast Range ecoregion and partly in the Willamette Valley ecoregion designated by the U.S. Environmental Protection Agency (EPA). The historic lower Balch Creek watershed through the 1880s was a mixture of open water, wetlands, grassland, and forest, while above the flood plain the watershed consisted of closed canopy forest. People who settled here in the 19th century logged much of this forest and filled the wetlands. In 2002, aerial photographs showed that buildings, parking lots, shoreline structures, and other cleared areas covered most of the lower floodplain. On the other hand, hill forests protected from major disturbance covered about 65 percent of the watershed.

Above the floodplain, much of the habitat in the watershed consists of mixed conifer forest. Trees and shrubs, including stands of red alder and cottonwood trees, cover about 88 percent of the middle reaches. Near the headwaters, the forests consist mainly of mixed conifers and hardwoods with a few older Douglas firs. Common species include big leaf maple, willow, western hemlock, red alder, western red cedar, and Douglas-fir. Most of this forest is relatively young. In Forest Park, old-growth forest, undisturbed for 250 years or more, exists mainly in isolated patches. The largest tree in the park, Heritage Tree 134, is a Douglas-fir near the Stone House. It is 242 feet (74 m) high, and the trunk is 18.6 feet (5.7 m) in circumference.

Forest Park and other areas of the watershed have an understory of well-developed shrubs including ferns, Oregon-grape, vine maple, salal, red huckleberry, Fendler's waterleaf, Indian plum, salmonberry, and stinging nettle. Among the prominent wildflowers are wild ginger, Hooker's fairy bells, vanilla leaf, evergreen violet, and trillium. Rare or uncommon species include old conifers, Western wahoo shrubs, and ornamental dawn redwoods. Invasive species are English ivy, European holly, clematis, morning glory, and Himalayan blackberry.

=== Fauna ===
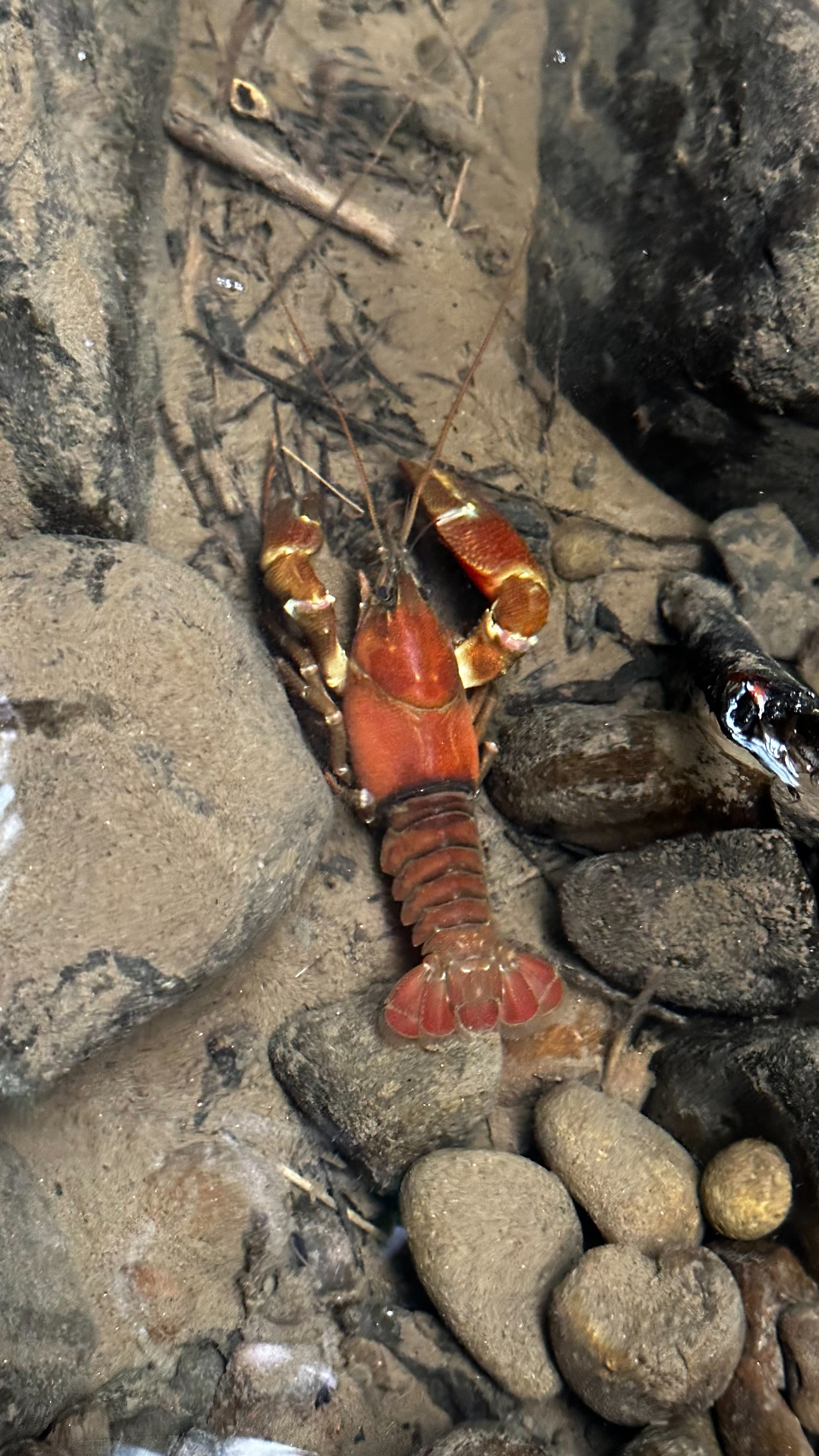
A signal crayfish in Balch Creek

The historic creek likely supported diverse fish species, including salmon. After people filled the wetlands and diverted the lower stretch of the creek into a pipe, fish could no longer migrate to and from the Willamette River. The industrial parts of the watershed have no remaining aquatic habitat, but above the pipe the aquatic habitat remains relatively high, and Balch Creek and its tributaries support a resident population of coastal cutthroat trout of up to about 7 inches (18 cm). Signal crayfish can also be found in the creek. In 2005, Balch Creek was the only major water body in Portland that met state water quality standards for bacteria, temperature and dissolved oxygen.

Nearby tracts of habitat strongly affect the wildlife in the Balch Creek watershed. This is especially true of Forest Park, which extends into other watersheds to the northwest. Birds and animals from these watersheds and from the Tualatin River valley, the Coast Range, the Willamette River, Sauvie Island, the Columbia River, and the Vancouver, Washington, lowlands, move in and out of the park with relative ease. Sixty-two mammal species, including the northern flying squirrel, black-tailed deer, creeping vole, bobcat, coyote, Mazama pocket gopher, little brown bat, Roosevelt elk, and Pacific jumping mouse use Forest Park. blue grouse, great horned owl, hairy woodpecker, Bewick's wren, orange-crowned warbler, osprey, and hermit thrush are among the 112 species of birds that frequent the area. Amphibian species seen at the Audubon Society pond include rough-skinned newts, Pacific tree frogs, and salamanders.

Pressure from habitat loss, pollution, hunting, and urban development has reduced or eliminated the large predators such as wolves, bears, and wild cats and has led to increased numbers of small predators such as weasels and raccoons. Roads through the watershed severely hamper the movement of large animals. Invasive plant species such as English ivy have made the habitat simpler and less supportive of native insects and the salamanders and other amphibians that feed on them. Citizen groups such as the No Ivy League and Friends of Forest Park (now the Forest Park Conservancy) have engaged in projects to remove ivy, to plant native species, and to widen and protect riparian zones.

== See also ==
- List of rivers of Oregon

== Sources ==
- Bishop, Ellen Morris (2003). In Search of Ancient Oregon: A Geological and Natural History. Portland, Oregon: Timber Press. ISBN 978-0-88192-789-4.
- Houle, Marcy Cottrell (1996). One City's Wilderness: Portland's Forest Park (2nd ed.). Portland: Oregon Historical Society Press. ISBN 0-87595-284-4.
- Short, Casey (1983). Water: Portland's Precious Heritage. Portland: City of Portland. OCLC 10431816.
