= Todd Alan Reed =

American serial killer

- Born: Todd Alan Thomas; May 22, 1967 (age 59); Portland, Oregon, U.S.
- Other name: "The Forest Park Killer"
- Employer: Rinella Produce
- Spouse: Gail Bennet (1988-1997)
- Children: 2
- Parent(s): Ronnie Thomas Marine Sgt. Alfred Thomas Robert Reed
- Conviction: Aggravated murder (3 counts)
- Penalty: Life imprisonment without parole

Details
- Victims: 3–5
- Span of crimes: April – June 1999 (possibly 1987)
- Country: United States
- State: Oregon
- Date apprehended: July 18, 1999

Todd Alan Reed (né Thomas; born May 22, 1967), known as The Forest Park Killer, is an American serial killer and sex offender who raped and strangled three homeless women in Portland, Oregon between April and June 1999, later dumping their bodies in the Forest Park reserve. He was convicted of these deaths and received three terms of life imprisonment and remains the sole suspect in two similar murders that occurred in nearby Gresham in 1987.

== Early life ==
Reed was born Todd Alan Thomas on May 22, 1967, in Portland, Oregon, to Ronnie Thomas and Marine Sgt. Alfred Thomas, who had married nine days prior. They had another son prior to their divorce in 1971. His mother would subsequently remarry Robert Reed, who adopted both boys. They divorced when Reed was 12.

By the age of 14, Reed was a registered sex offender and was put in a residential program for his crimes, but, as he wasn't considered dangerous, he was released. In the following years, Reed met Gail Bennett in 1986, whom he would later marry in 1988. Reed and Bennet had two children and, after Bennet divorced Reed in 1997, Reed was ordered to pay child support and granted visitation.

Reed worked at Rinella Produce, where he was described as a diligent worker who never made any trouble. During this time, several homeless women from around the city began disappearing.

== Murders ==
=== Confirmed ===
- Lilla Faye Moler (28) - a homeless prostitute suffering from manic depression, Moler had previous convictions for drug use and prostitution. She went missing in April 1999, and her body was later found by a couple walking their dog on May 7, covered with tree branches and leaves. She had been sexually assaulted and strangled to death. A condom containing the killer's DNA was found 28 feet away from her body.
- Stephanie Lynn Russell (26) - a fellow homeless prostitute and acquaintance of Moler, Russell's body was found by police while they were searching the area where the previous victim was located. Her body was discarded only a quarter-mile away from Lilla, and had also been sexually assaulted and strangled. Unlike Moler, authorities suspected that Russell had died much more recently, likely within a week of being found.
- Alexandria Nicole Ison (17) - a transient runaway with substance abuse issues and contact with the justice system was found by a hiker on a trail running along Forest Park on June 2. The area hadn't been searched by authorities the previous month. Her body had been dumped down a steep hill, about a quarter-mile away from the other victims, and she had also been sexually assaulted and strangled like them. Ison had been missing since May.

=== Suspected ===
- Jennifer Lynn Tchir (15) - Tchir went missing on July 3, 1987, in Gresham, and was last seen with Reed's girlfriend, Gail Bennett. Initially, a biology student from Mt. Hood Community College discovered a human shin and heel bone on July 18, 1988, and over the week, Explorer Scouts discovered enough bones from the brushy fields in the southeastern part of the city to make a nearly complete skeleton. It was later positively identified as Tchir by the Multnomah County Medical Examiner's office, with the cause of death being labeled as asphyxiation.
- Mindi Coleen Thomas (12) - Thomas disappeared from her apartment complex in Gresham on August 3, 1987. Like Tchir, she was last seen in the company of Gail Bennett. That same October, her remains were found near a hiking trail close to the Mt. Hood Community College. She too had been strangled to death.

According to the Gresham Police Department, the suspect in both of these cases was described as a white male in his late teens to early 20s, with very dark, short hair, thick eyebrows and little beard hairs along the chin line. He wore military-type glasses with metal frames and a stud-type earring in his left ear, and apparently drove a car described as a metallic blue-colored 1970s model Dodge Charger. Capt. Gerald Johnson noted in a written statement that the man was likely acquainted with the girls or their circle of friends, as he was seen calling out to Tchir by name at a convenience store on the day of her disappearance.

== Arrest, trial and imprisonment ==
On July 7, a female police officer who matched the then-unknown killer's physical preferences posed as a prostitute in an attempt to lure him out. Reed was observed stalking the officer, and one of the lookouts recognized him from an earlier conviction for burglary and assault, from which he spent 2.5 years behind bars. On July 18, Reed was arrested at his job in Rinella Produce for the murders of Moler, Russell, and Ison after his DNA was matched to the crime scenes.

On February 23, 2001, he pleaded guilty to the murders in order to avoid the death penalty, and was sentenced to three consecutive life terms. Reed was questioned about the two 1987 Gresham murders, as he met every criterion for the suspect's description, but to this day, he has yet to be charged with either of them. As of June 2020, Reed is housed out of state in New Jersey State Prison.

== See also ==
- List of serial killers in the United States

== Bibliography ==
- W. Jerry Chisum and Brent E. Turvey (2011). Crime Reconstruction: Second Edition. Academic Press. ISBN 978-0123864604.
- John O. Savino and Brent E. Turvey (August 23, 2011). Rape Investigation Handbook. Academic Press. ISBN 978-0123860309.
