= Bird Alliance of Oregon =

Environmental organization

Coordinates: 45.526777°N 122.730305°W

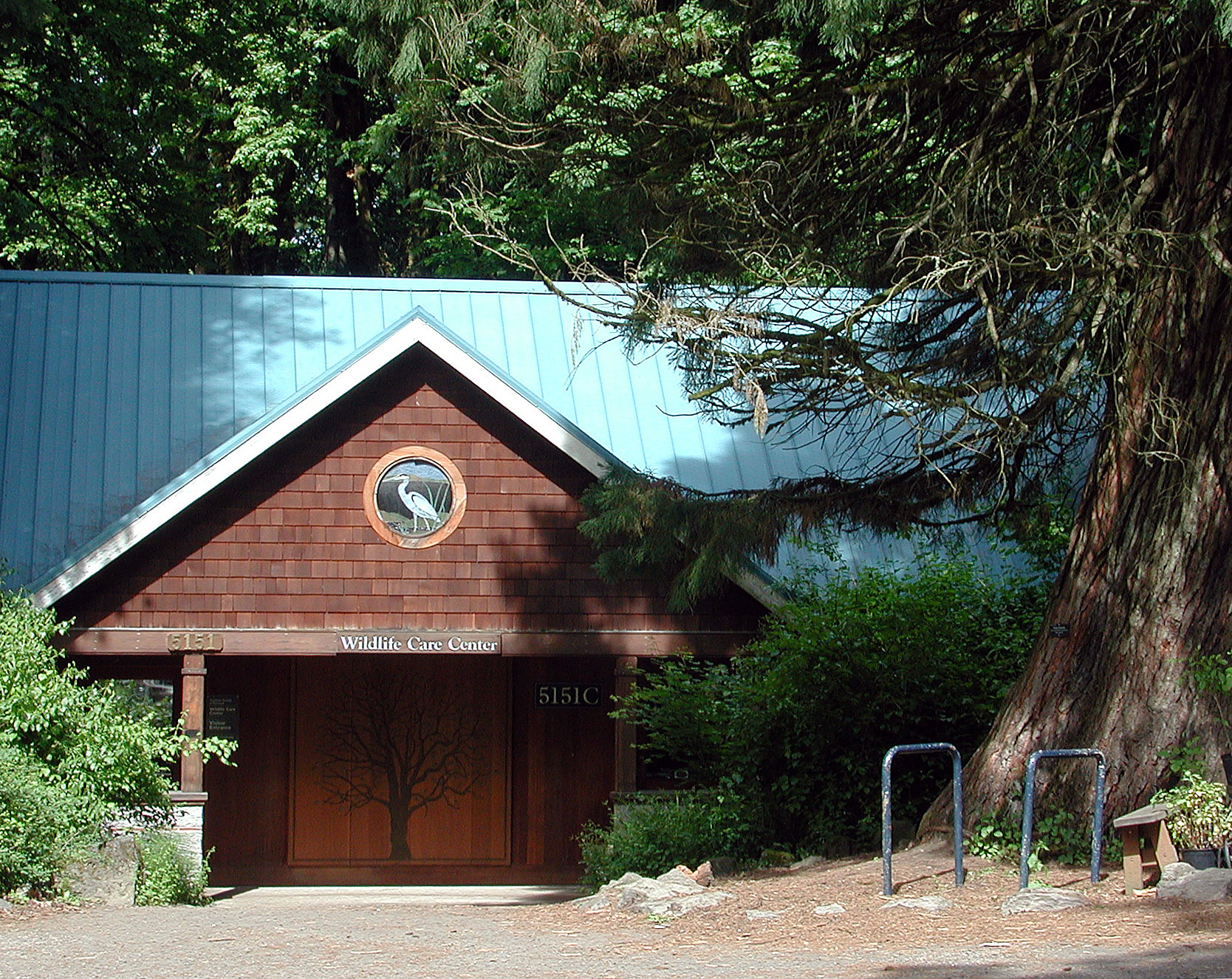
- Bird Alliance of Oregon Wildlife Care Center.
- Formation: 1902
- Established: 1909
- Type: Nonprofit
- Headquarters: Astoria, Oregon
- Fields: Bird and habitat protection

The Bird Alliance of Oregon (formerly the Audubon Society of Portland) is a non-profit environmental organization dedicated to bird and habitat protection across Oregon in the United States. Founded in 1902 and incorporated in 1909, it is one of the oldest conservation organizations in the world.

== History ==
Portland birders created the John Burroughs Club in 1898. In 1901, birders in Astoria—Oregon's second-largest city at the time—formed the Oregon Audubon Society. In 1902, the Portland group merged with them as Oregon Audubon Society. The named changed to Audubon Society of Portland in 1966 when members agreed to affiliate with the National Audubon Society.

The society has long conducted letter-writing campaigns to influence legislation. They helped pass the Model Bird Law in 1903, protecting native birds from being shot and sold. A 1925 letter-writing campaign to President Calvin Coolidge successfully led to creation of Hart Mountain Antelope Refuge. The society takes credit for helping to establish several national refuges, including William L. Finley NWR, Three Arch Rocks NWR, Klamath NWR, Ankeny NWR, Baskett Slough NWR, and Malheur NWR.

In 2015, the Alliance threatened to sue the U.S. Army Corps of Engineers in regards to its plan to exterminate 11,000 double-crested cormorants and 26,000 nests on East Sand Island (57% population reduction).

In 2023, more than 450 volunteers contributed to the Bird Alliance of Oregon's efforts, including visitor reception, trail maintenance, nature store attendant, clerical, conservation activists, and wildlife caretakers. It is one of the most highly rated charities of its kind, based on operational and organizational efficiency.

In February 2024, the organization changed its name from Portland Audubon to Bird Alliance of Oregon to remove the name Audubon, due to John James Audubon's racist history, and changed to Oregon to reflect their statewide work.

In 2025 the Bird Alliance purchased 12.5 acres of land in NE Portland where it will build a second wildlife hospital. This new care center will be larger than the one it currently maintains on Northwest Cornell Road.

== Activities ==
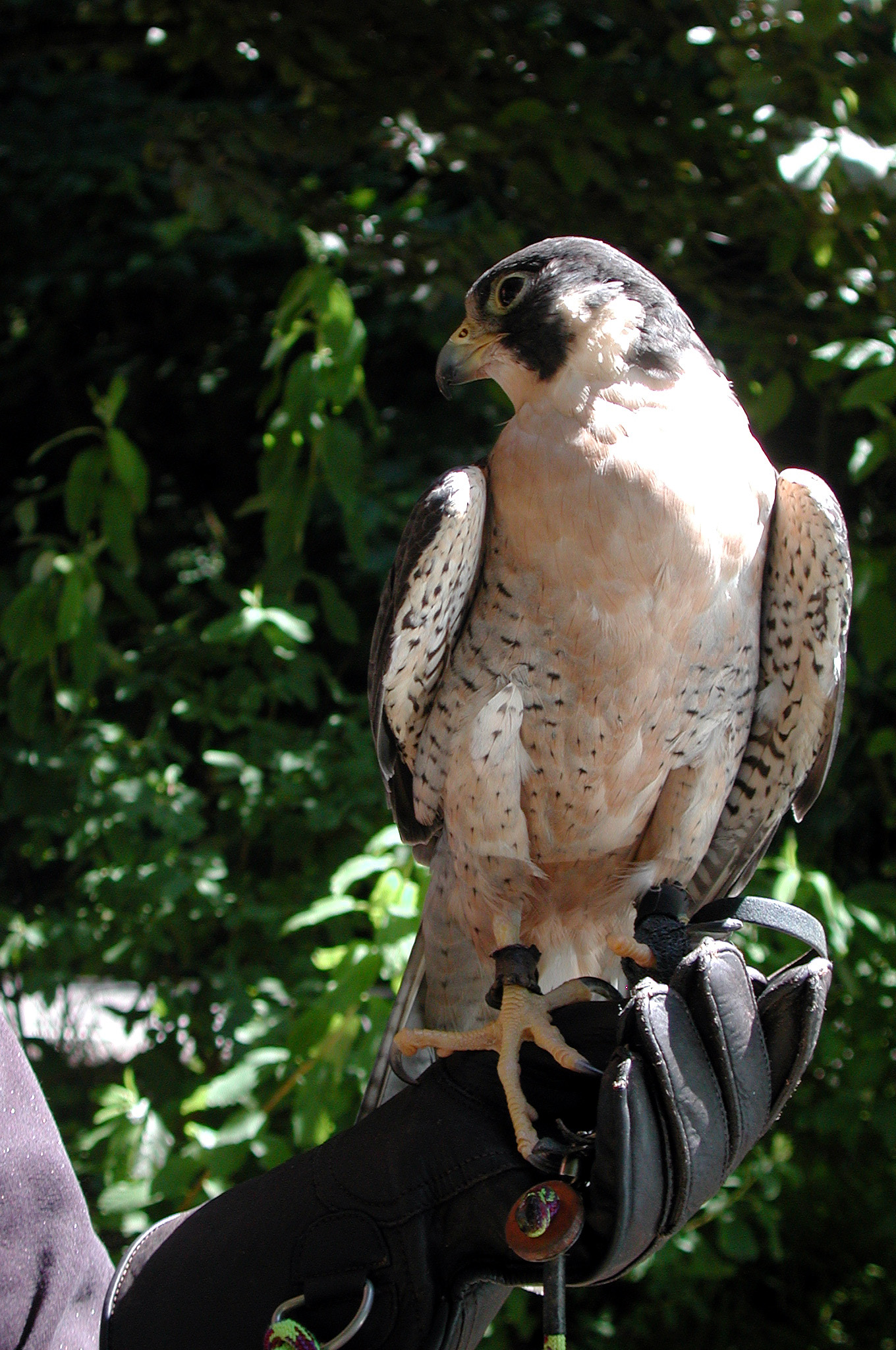
A peregrine falcon named Finnegan was a former educational bird at the sanctuary.

The Bird Alliance of Oregon was founded to advocate for the establishment of Malheur, Klamath and Three Arch Rocks National Wildlife Refuges. Today they work on issues like protecting imperiled species, fighting climate change, protecting and restoring habitat, and increasing equitable access to nature.

The Bird Alliance of Oregon owns 172 acres (0.70 km^{2}) of woodland adjacent to Forest Park, managed as a nature sanctuary and features indigenous vegetation and fauna, including a small stand of old-growth Douglas Fir trees. The sanctuary is open to the public for free. Much of the sanctuary surrounds Balch Creek near its headwaters and contains more than 4 miles (6.4 km) of hiking trails which connect to Forest Park's extensive trail system.

Within the sanctuary is a nature center containing classrooms, retail store, wildlife taxidermy exhibits, auditorium, and a wildlife care center. The care center treats injured and orphaned native wildlife utilizing professional staff and more than one hundred volunteers. More than 4,000 animals are brought to the center each year.

Displays of live educational birds are adjacent to the care center. Two birds are on display, having injuries or imprinting that prevent them from successful reintroduction to the wild. Currently there is a great horned owl and an American kestrel. There is also a western painted turtle that was rescued from a pet store and now lives in a tank inside the Care Center.

The Bird Alliance of Oregon is frequently consulted for expertise related to practical wildlife questions and wildlife management practices.

Every year, the Bird Alliance organizes a road trip to Sauvie Island to celebrate raptors.

== See also ==
- List of Oregon birds
- Chapman swifts, a migratory flock which roosts each autumn in a grade school chimney maintained by the Audubon Society of Portland
