= Donald Macleay =

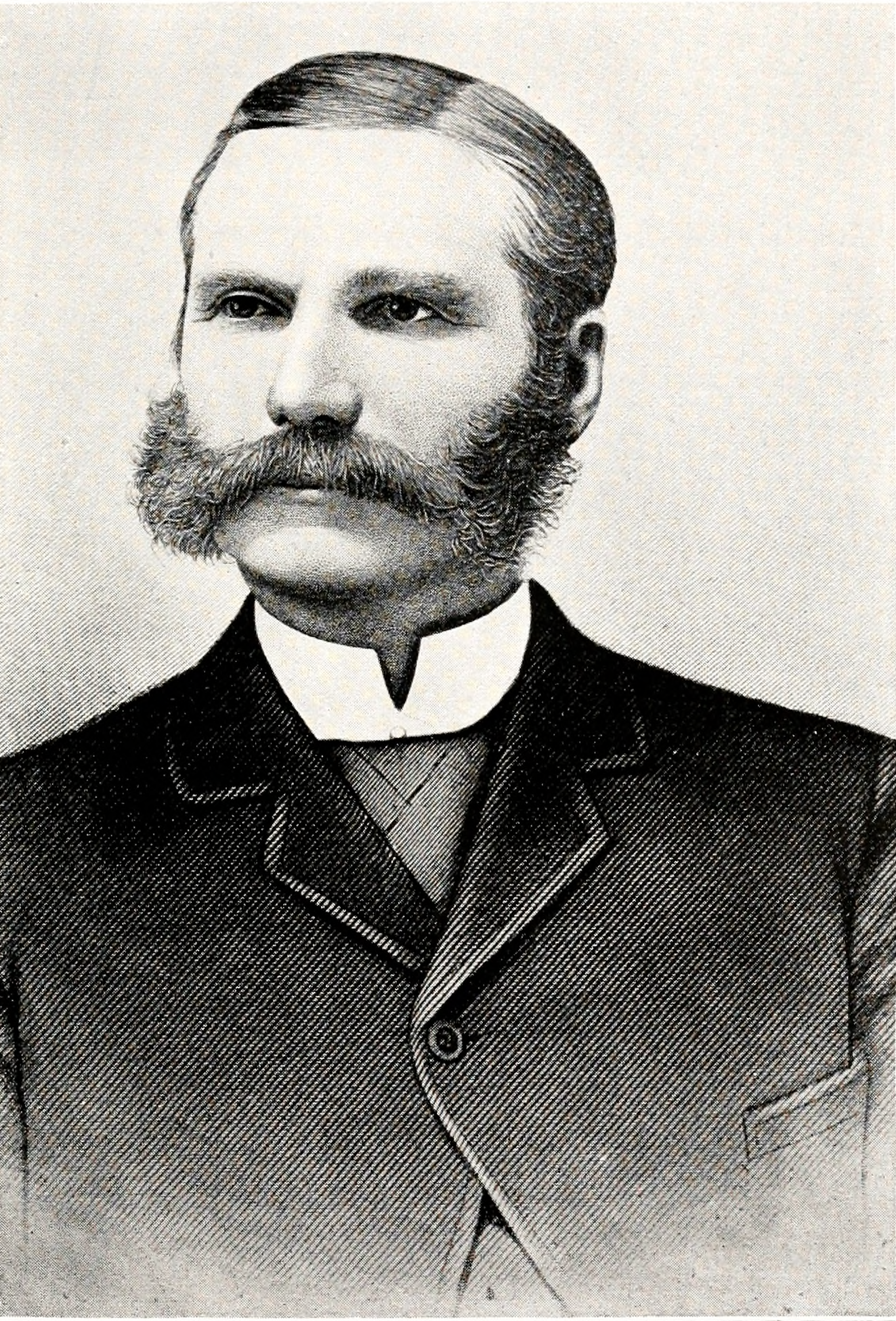
- Donald Macleay
- Born: August 1834; Leckmelm, Ross-shire, Scotland
- Died: July 26, 1897 (aged 62); Portland, Oregon, United States
- Education: private tutor and academy in Leckmelm
- Occupations: Merchant and banker
- Spouse: Martha Macculloch
- Children: Barbara, Edith, Mabel, Roderick

Donald Macleay (August 1834 – July 26, 1897) was a 19th century merchant and banker in Portland in the U.S. state of Oregon. A native of Scotland, he emigrated at the age of 16 with his parents to the Canadian province of Quebec before relocating as an adult to California and, later, Oregon. With his business partner William Corbitt, he established a highly profitable wholesale and shipping business in Portland that centered on groceries and liquor, then wheat, salmon, and timber exports. He invested in Oregon railroads, served for a time as president of the Portland Board of Trade, and is generally credited with founding the U.S. National Bank of Portland (forerunner of U.S. Bancorp), of which he was president toward the end of his life.

Macleay was active in Portland's social organizations such as the St. Andrew Society and the Arlington Club. He and his wife, Martha, had four children, one of whom, Roderick, became a director of his father's bank. His legacy includes Macleay Park, a part of Forest Park in Portland, and Macleay, an unincorporated Oregon community that was renamed in his honor in 1882.

== Early life ==
Donald Macleay was born in Leckmelm, Ross-shire, Scotland, in August 1834. As a child, he had a private tutor and went to school in Leckmelm. Financial difficulties caused his parents to move to Canada and settle on a farm near Melbourne, Quebec, when Macleay was 16. By age 20, he had formed a business partnership with a merchant, George K. Foster, of Richmond, Quebec.

== Merchant, banker, public figure ==
At the age of 25, Macleay went to California, where he met William Corbitt, and by 1866 they had established a wholesale grocery and shipping business, Corbitt & Macleay, in Portland. The business grew rapidly and by 1870 had become "one of the leading firms of the northwest".

One of several Scottish merchants and financiers who moved to Portland in the 1860s and 1870s, Macleay was among the most successful. Starting as grocery and liquor merchants, Corbitt & Macleay expanded to wheat and salmon exports, and, taking advantage of cheap Asian (coolie) labor, they supplied buyers in Hong Kong with spars and ship planking. In addition, Macleay became involved in railroad investments through his association with another native of Scotland, William Reid, who formed the Portland Board of Trade, and Henry Villard, who organized the Oregon Railway and Navigation Company.

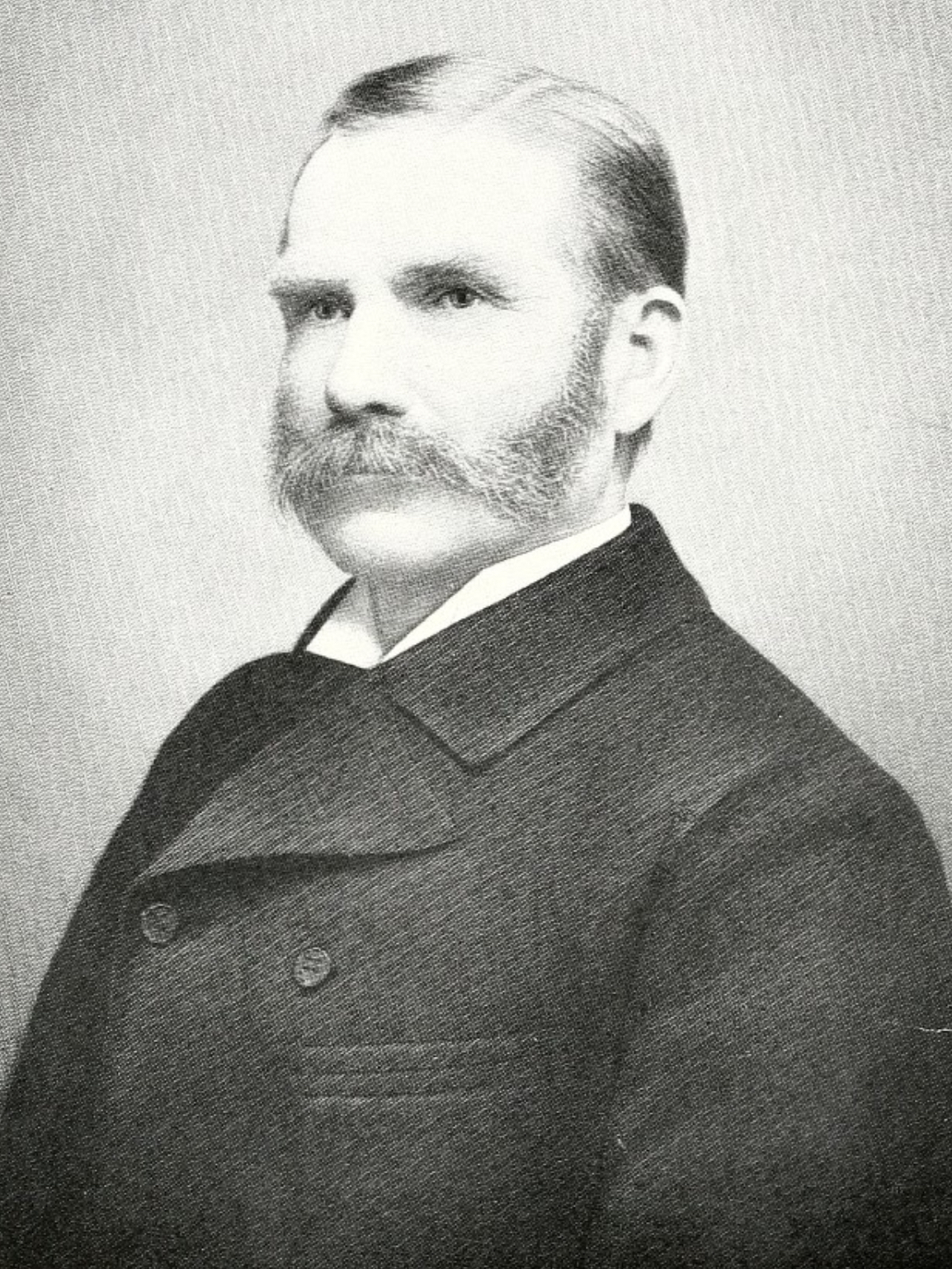
Donald Macleay

Macleay was active in many banking and investment enterprises in and near Portland. He served as a director of the Portland & Coast Steamship Company, the Portland Telephone & Electric Light Company, and other businesses and banks, and he was for a time the vice president of the Oregon & California Railway Company. As president of the Portland Board of Trade, he worked to persuade the U.S. government to build a jetty system at the Columbia Bar. He was one of the founders of the Portland Chamber of Commerce.

Retiring from the wholesale mercantile business in 1892, he helped to establish the United States National Bank of Portland (forerunner of U.S. Bancorp) and served as its president. (Note: MacColl says that "Macleay has traditionally been credited with founding the U.S. National Bank, although the bank's largest initial stockholder, a wealthy Denver businessman, G.W.E. Griffith, contested this assertion 40 years later. However, by lending his name and prestige to the bank he headed for four years, Macleay was certainly responsible for its early success.") He was president of the British Benevolent and St. Andrew societies of Portland and was one of the founders of the Arlington Club.

== Family life ==
In 1869 Macleay married Martha Macculloch of Compton, Quebec. The couple had four children, Barbara, Edith, Mabel, and Roderick, and were members of the First Presbyterian Church of Portland. Martha died in 1876, and Macleay later remarried. Roderick was a director of the U.S. Bank in the early 20th century.

== Death and legacy ==
During the Panic of 1893, when many banks failed, the U.S. Bank survived. However, to help keep the bank afloat, Macleay loaned it large sums of his own money and took no pay as bank president. Exhausted, he retired in the spring of 1895 and died on July 26, 1897.

Long before his death, Macleay's interest in the Oregonian Railway Company, which had built a narrow-gauge railway in the eastern Willamette Valley, led him to donate money for a schoolhouse at a railroad station in Marion County. The community, formerly named Stipp, was renamed Macleay in 1882.

In 1897, Macleay deeded a 108-acre (44 ha) tract of land along Balch Creek to the city to provide an outdoor space for patients from nearby hospitals. Developed by the city, this tract, known as Macleay Park, was one of many parks and land parcels that were combined to form Portland's Forest Park in 1948. Macleay Park is still referred to by its original name even though it is part of the larger park.

== Notes and references ==
Notes

== Works cited ==
- Corning, Howard M., ed. (1989) [1956]. Dictionary of Oregon History. Portland: Binford & Mort Publishing. ISBN 0-8323-0449-2.
- Gaston, Joseph (1911). Portland, Oregon, its history and builders: in connection with the Antecedent Explorations, Discoveries, and Movements of the Pioneers That Selected the Site for the Great City of the Pacific, vol. 3. Chicago, Illinois: The S.J. Clarke Publishing Company.OCLC 1183569.
- MacColl, E. Kimbark; Stein, Harry H. (1988). Merchants, Money, and Power: The Portland Establishment 1843–1913. Portland, Oregon: The Georgian Press. ISBN 0-9603408-4-X.
- McArthur, Lewis A., and McArthur, Lewis L. (2003) [1928]. Oregon Geographic Names, 7th edition. Portland: Oregon Historical Society Press. ISBN 0-87595-277-1.
