= Forest Park (Portland, Oregon) =

Public municipal park west of downtown Portland, Oregon

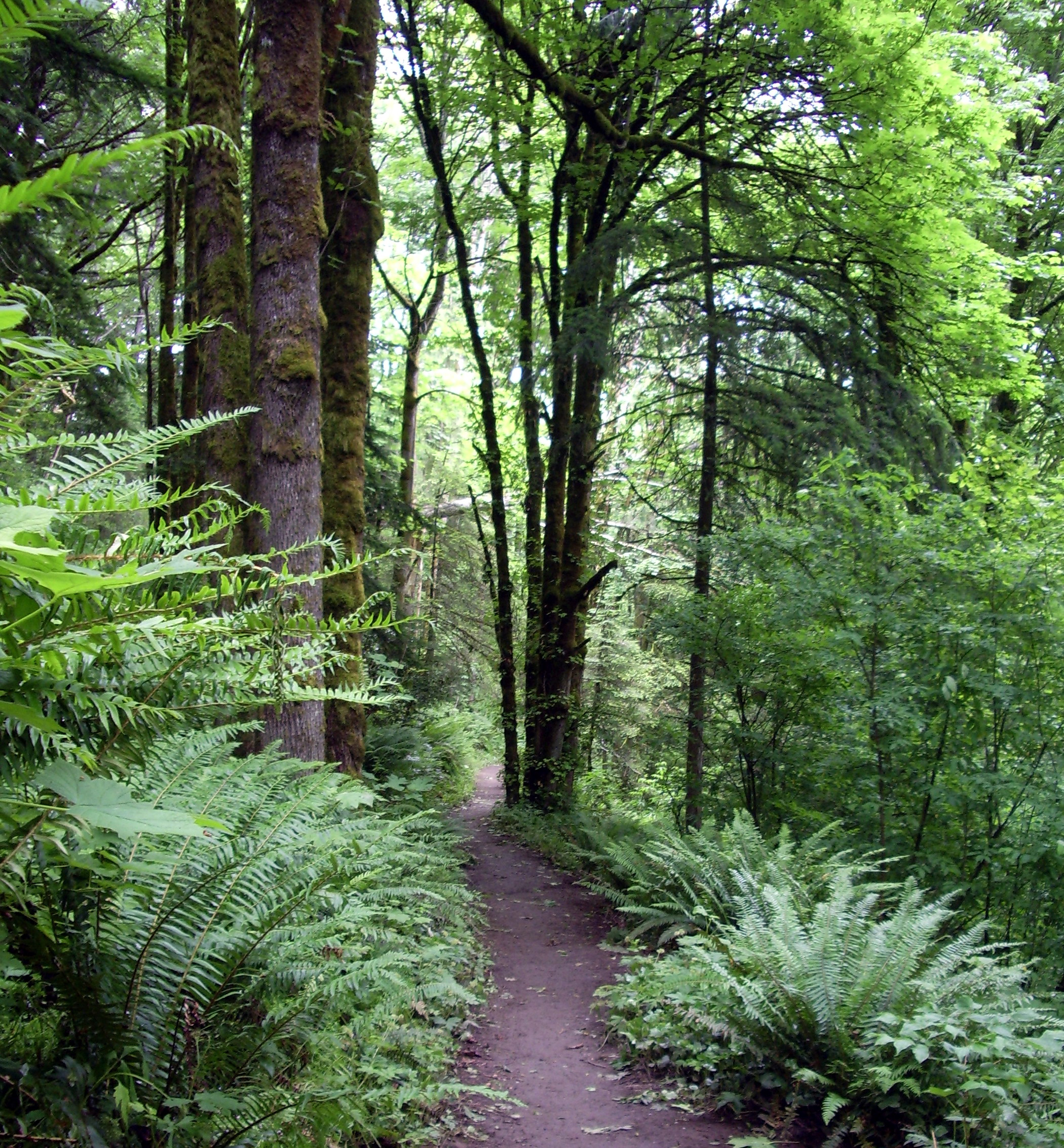
- Wildwood Trail in June 2008

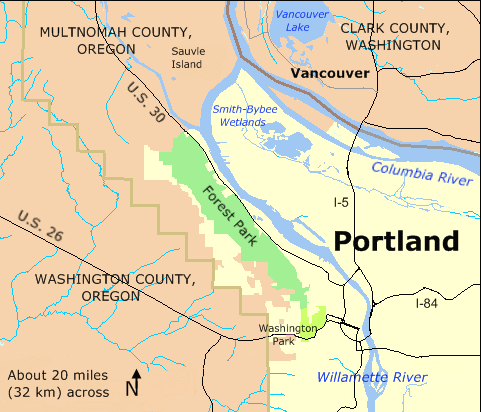
- Location of Forest Park and Washington Park in Portland
- Location: Multnomah, Portland, Oregon, United States
- Coordinates: 45°32′43″N 122°44′10″W
- Area: 5,172.14 acres (20.9309 km^{2})
- Elevation: 718 ft (219 m)
- Established: 1948
- Named for: Urban forest reserve
- Governing body: Portland Parks & Recreation Department

Forest Park is a public municipal park in the Tualatin Mountains west of downtown Portland, Oregon, United States. Stretching for more than 8 miles (13 km) on hillsides overlooking the Willamette River, it is one of the country's largest urban forest reserves. The park, a major component of a regional system of parks and trails, covers more than 5,100 acres (2,064 ha) of mostly second-growth forest with a few patches of old growth. More than 80 miles (130 km) of recreational trails, including the Wildwood Trail segment of the city's 40-Mile Loop system, crisscross the park.

As early as the 1860s, civic leaders sought to create a natural preserve in the woods near Portland. Their efforts led to the creation of a municipal park commission that in 1903 hired the Olmsted Brothers landscape architectural firm to develop a plan for Portland's parks. Acquiring land through donations, transfers from Multnomah County, and delinquent tax foreclosures, the city eventually acted on a proposal by the City Club of Portland and combined parcels totaling about 4,000 acres (1,600 ha) to create the reserve. Formally dedicated in 1948, it ranks 19th in size among parks within U.S. cities, according to the Trust for Public Land.

More than 112 bird species and 62 mammal species frequent the park and its wide variety of trees and shade-loving plants. About 40 inches (1,000 mm) of rain falls on the forest each year. Many small tributaries of the Willamette River flow northeast through the woods to pipes or culverts under U.S. Route 30 at the edge of the park. One of them, Balch Creek, has a resident trout population, and another, Miller Creek, supports sea-run species, including salmon.

Threats to the park include overuse, urban traffic, encroaching development, invasive flora, and lack of maintenance money. Occasional serious crimes and more frequent minor crimes occur in the park.

== Geology and geography ==
Solidified lava from Grande Ronde members of the Columbia River Basalt Group underlie Forest Park. About 16 million years ago during the Middle Miocene, the Columbia River ran through a lowland south of its modern channel. Eruptions from linear vents in eastern Oregon and Washington flowed down this channel through what later became the Willamette Valley. These flows, some of which reached the Pacific Ocean, recurred at intervals between 16.5 and 15.6 million years ago and covered almost 60,000 square miles (160,000 km^{2}). About eight separate Grande Ronde Basalt flows have been mapped in the Tualatin Mountains (West Hills), where they underlie the steepest slopes of Forest Park and form the columned rocks visible along Balch Creek Canyon and Northwest Cornell Road. The West Hills were later covered by wind-deposited silts that become unstable when saturated with water. Stream bank instability and siltation are common, and landslides deter urban development at higher elevations.

Roughly 8 miles (13 km) long, the park is less than 1 mile (1.6 km) wide near downtown Portland and about 2 miles (3.2 km) wide at its northwestern end. It extends along the West Hills from West Burnside Street near downtown Portland to where the Willamette River divides to flow around Sauvie Island. Covering most of the east face of the ridge above the Willamette River, it is bounded by West Burnside Street on the south, Northwest Skyline Boulevard on the west, Northwest Newberry Road on the north, and Northwest St. Helens Road (U.S. Route 30) on the east. Elevations above sea level vary from 50 feet (15 m) near U.S. Route 30 at the base of the ridge to about 1,100 feet (340 m) near the crest of the ridge along Northwest Skyline Boulevard.

In 2008 Forest Park ranked 19th in size among the largest city parks in the United States, according to The Trust for Public Land. The trust's list included state parks, national parks, county parks, regional parks, and national wildlife refuges, as well as municipally owned parks located within cities. Chugach State Park in Anchorage, Alaska, was in first place with 490,125 acres (1,983 km^{2}).

Portland author Marcy Houle says that the park "captures the essence of what is natural and wild and beautiful about the Northwest... From this forest sanctuary, panoramic views of the city of Portland, the Willamette and Columbia rivers, and five major peaks of the Cascade Range ... can be seen through the tall fir trees. From its inception ..., Forest Park has been a refuge for both people and wildlife, and an integral part of the environment of Portland."

== Ecology ==
=== Vegetation ===
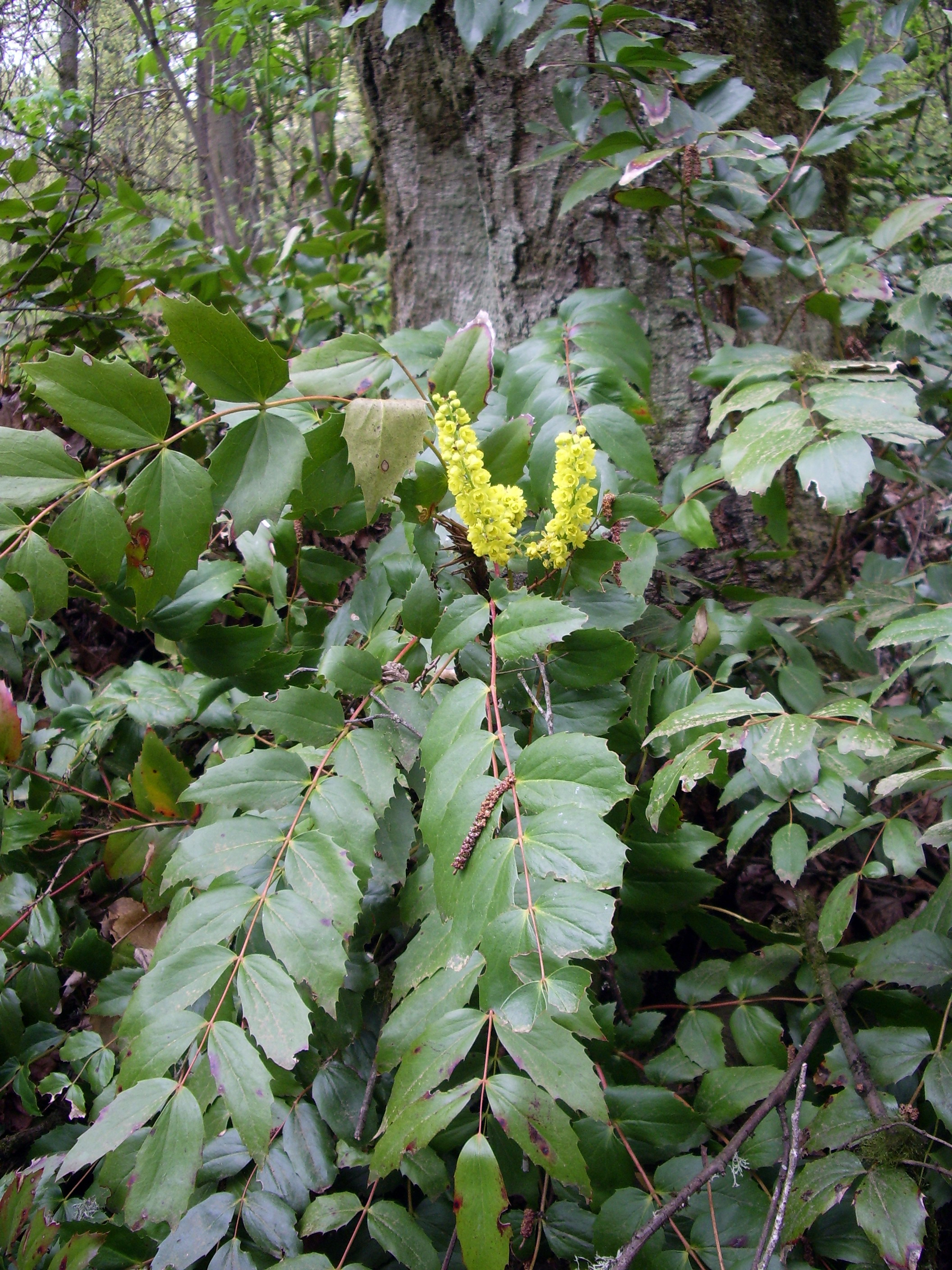
Oregon-grape at the foot of a Douglas-fir near Wildwood Trail

Forest Park lies in the Coast Range ecoregion designated by the U.S. Environmental Protection Agency (EPA). In its natural state, the forest consists mainly of three tree species: Douglas-fir, western hemlock, and western red cedar. It also includes smaller numbers of grand fir, black cottonwood, red alder, bigleaf maple, madrone, and western yew. Much of the forest that existed there before 1850 was gone by 1940. The stage of regrowth in the forest depends on when it was last logged or burned.

In the mid-1990s, about 1% of the total vegetation in the park consisted of grasses, bracken, thistle, and fireweed in sections of the forest cleared two to five years earlier. Another 2% had reached the shrub stage, between three and thirty years old, with small trees dominated by such plants as thimbleberry, salmonberry, and blackberry. Forest areas 10 to 30 years old that contained tall alder and maple trees and smaller conifers accounted for about 20% of the park.

Larger areas were occupied by forests in which conifers had grown taller than the alders and maples. About 50% of Forest Park consists of these areas, which are between 30 and 80 years old and in which Douglas-firs have begun to dominate. Another 25% of the park contains forests dominated by middle-aged conifers, 80 to 250 years old. In these areas, red alders, which live for about 100 years, have begun to die, and the Douglas-firs, which can live for 750 years, attain heights up to about 240 feet (73 m). Under the big trees are shade-tolerant trees such as western red cedar, western hemlock, and grand fir and smaller plants such as Oregon-grape, vine maple, and salal.

The last forest stage, old growth, is reached after 250 years and includes many snags, downed and dead trees, and fallen logs. Timber-cutting and fires reduced old growth in Forest Park to "almost nothing" by 1940, and most of the forest has not yet attained this stage. Patches exist near Macleay Park and further west near Germantown Road and Newton Road. The largest tree in Forest Park is a Douglas-fir near the Stone House, the remains of a former public restroom near Balch Creek. It is 242 feet (74 m) high, and the trunk is 18.6 feet (5.7 m) in circumference.

Among the prominent wildflowers are Hooker's fairy bells, vanilla leaf, evergreen violet, and trillium. Invasive species include English ivy, European holly, clematis, morning glory, and Himalayan blackberry. Citizen groups such as the No Ivy League. and The Forest Park Conservancy engage in projects to remove ivy, maintain trails, and plant native species.

=== Wildlife ===
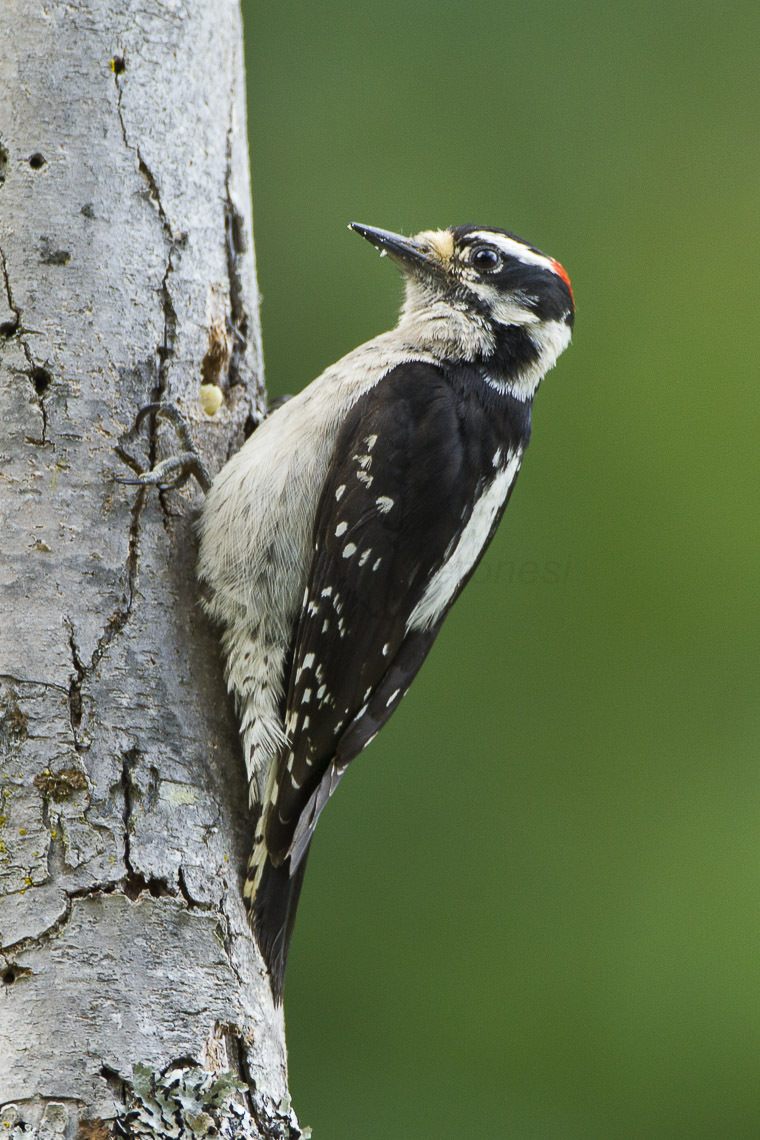
The hairy woodpecker is one of many species of birds living in the park.

Wildlife in Forest Park is strongly affected by contiguous tracts of nearby habitat that make the park accessible to birds and animals from the Tualatin River valley, the Oregon Coast Range, the Willamette River, Sauvie Island, the Columbia River, and the Vancouver, Washington, lowlands. Sixty-two mammal species, including the northern flying squirrel, black-tailed deer, creeping vole, bobcat, coyote, Mazama pocket gopher, little brown bat, Roosevelt elk, and Pacific jumping mouse frequent Forest Park. Blue grouse, great horned owl, hairy woodpecker, Bewick's wren, orange-crowned warbler, osprey, northern pygmy-owl, and hermit thrush are among the more than 112 species of birds that have been observed in the park. In Balch Creek Canyon adjacent to Forest Park, the Audubon Society of Portland maintains a wildlife sanctuary with more than 4 miles (6.4 km) of trails, a wildlife care center, and avian exhibits. Amphibian species frequenting the Audubon Society pond include rough-skinned newts, Pacific tree frogs, and salamanders.

Pressure from habitat loss, pollution, hunting, and urban development has reduced or eliminated the presence of wolves, bears, and wild cats and has led to increased numbers of weasels, raccoons, and other small predators. Invasive plant species such as English ivy have made the habitat simpler and less supportive of native insects and the salamanders and other amphibians that feed on them. Roads in the area severely hamper the movement of large animals. Multnomah County has designated Northwest Cornell Road and Northwest Germantown Road as "rural collector" streets, carrying traffic of less than 3,000 vehicles per day but more than streets designated as "local roads". Dogs allowed to run (illegally) off-leash in the park pose threats to birds, fish, and other wildlife.

=== Creeks ===
About 40 inches (1,000 mm) of rain falls on Forest Park each year. Many small creeks, only a few of which are named, flow northeast through the park from the ridge at the top of the West Hills to the base of the hills near U.S. Route 30. The five named streams from east to west are: Balch Creek, Rocking Chair Creek, Saltzman Creek, Doane Creek, and Miller Creek. Rocking Chair Creek is a tributary of Saltzman Creek. After leaving the park, the streams pass through culverts and other conduits before reaching the Willamette River. These conduits block fish migration to and from the Willamette River except on Miller Creek, where the conduits are short and have been modified to assist the fish.

Near the east end of the park, the free-flowing reaches of Balch Creek support a population of resident cutthroat trout. Near the west end, furthest from the city center, Miller Creek retains much of its historic nature and supports a greater diversity of aquatic organisms than other Forest Park streams. Biological field surveys of Miller Creek in 1990 noted sea-run cutthroat trout, coho salmon, and short-head cottid, as well as abundant macroinvertebrate species including stoneflies, mayflies, caddisflies, water striders, and crayfish.

== History ==
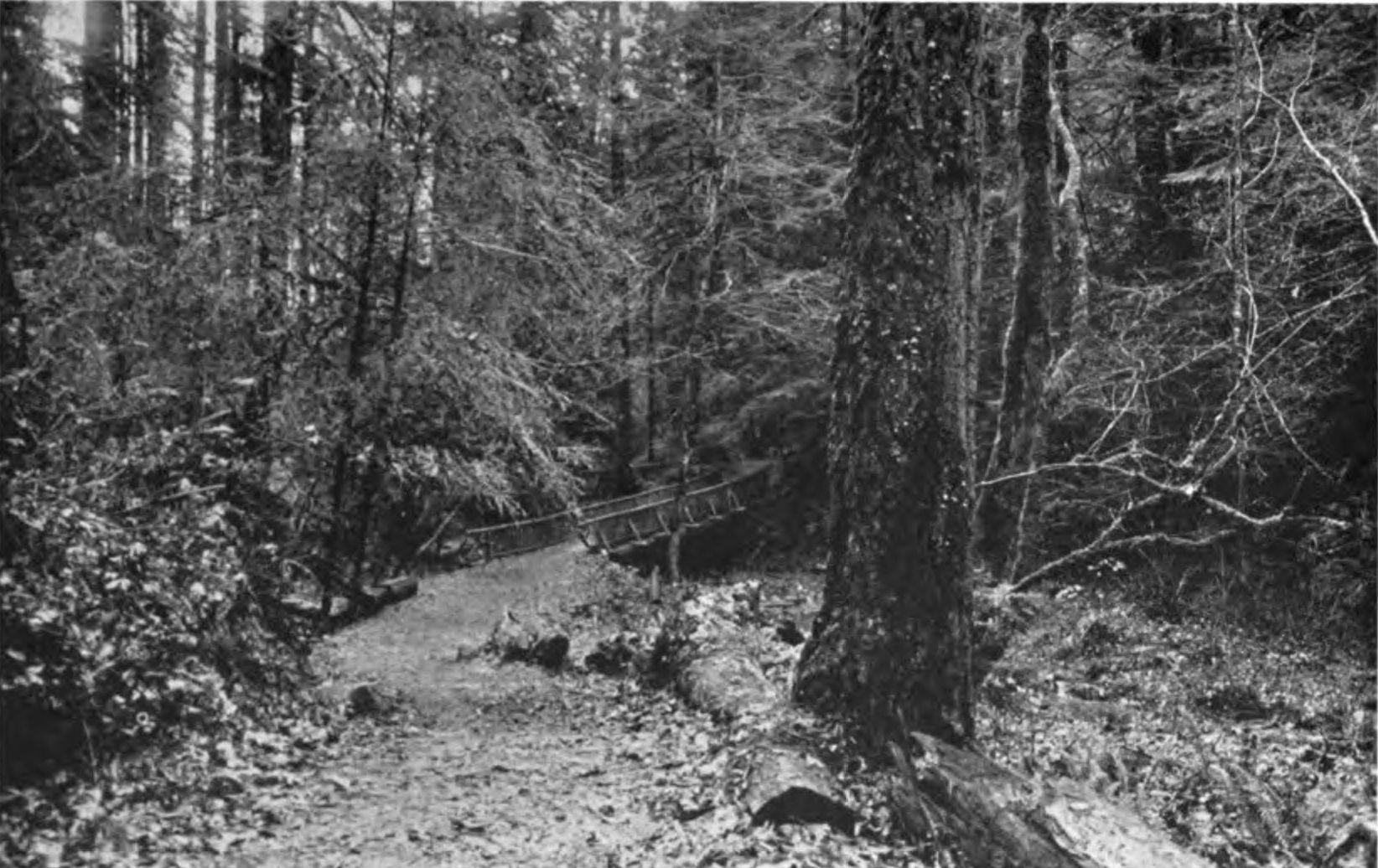
A bridge in then Macleay Park c. 1914

Before settlers arrived, the land that became known as Forest Park was covered by a Douglas-fir forest. By 1851, its acreage had been divided into donation land claims filed by settlers with plans to clear the forest and build upon the property. After logging, the steep slopes and unstable silt loosened by heavy rains caused landslides that defeated construction plans, and claims were defaulted or donated to the city.

Civic leaders beginning with the Reverend Thomas Lamb Eliot, a minister who moved to Portland in 1867, sought to create a natural preserve in the woods that eventually became Forest Park. By 1899, Eliot's efforts led to the formation of the Municipal Park Commission of Portland, which in 1903 hired the highly regarded landscape architecture firm, the Olmsted Brothers of Brookline, Massachusetts, to study the city's park system and recommend a plan. John Charles Olmsted, the stepson of Frederick Law Olmsted, spent May 1903 in Portland. The Olmsted Report, received in December, emphasized creation of a system of parks and linking parkways that would take advantage of natural scenery. It proposed a formal square for Union Station, squares along the downtown waterfront, and parks in places later known as Forest Park, Sellwood Park, Mount Tabor Park, Rocky Butte, and Ross Island, as well as Terwilliger Parkway, the 40-Mile Loop, and other connecting parkways. Proposed parks for Swan Island, in the Willamette River, and other places in Portland did not develop. Others like Forest Park came into being only many years later.

The city acquired land for Forest Park bit by bit over several decades. In 1897, Donald Macleay, a Portland merchant and real-estate developer, deeded a 108-acre (44 ha) tract of land along Balch Creek to the city to provide an outdoor space for patients from nearby hospitals. In the 1890s, Frederick Van Voorhies Holman, a Portland lawyer and a president of the Oregon Historical Society, proposed a gift of 52 acres (21 ha) of nearby land that was added to the city's holdings in 1939 when his siblings, George F. and Mary Holman, completed the donation. Clark and Wilson Timber Company donated 17 acres (6.9 ha) in 1927 to create a Western Oregon timber park near Northwest Germantown Road. Nine years later, the estate of Aaron Meier, one of the founders of the Meier & Frank chain of department stores, donated land for Linnton Park near Portland's Linnton neighborhood along Highway 30. These smaller parks became part of the larger park when it was finally created. Some of them, such as Macleay Park, are still referred to by their original names even though they are part of Forest Park.

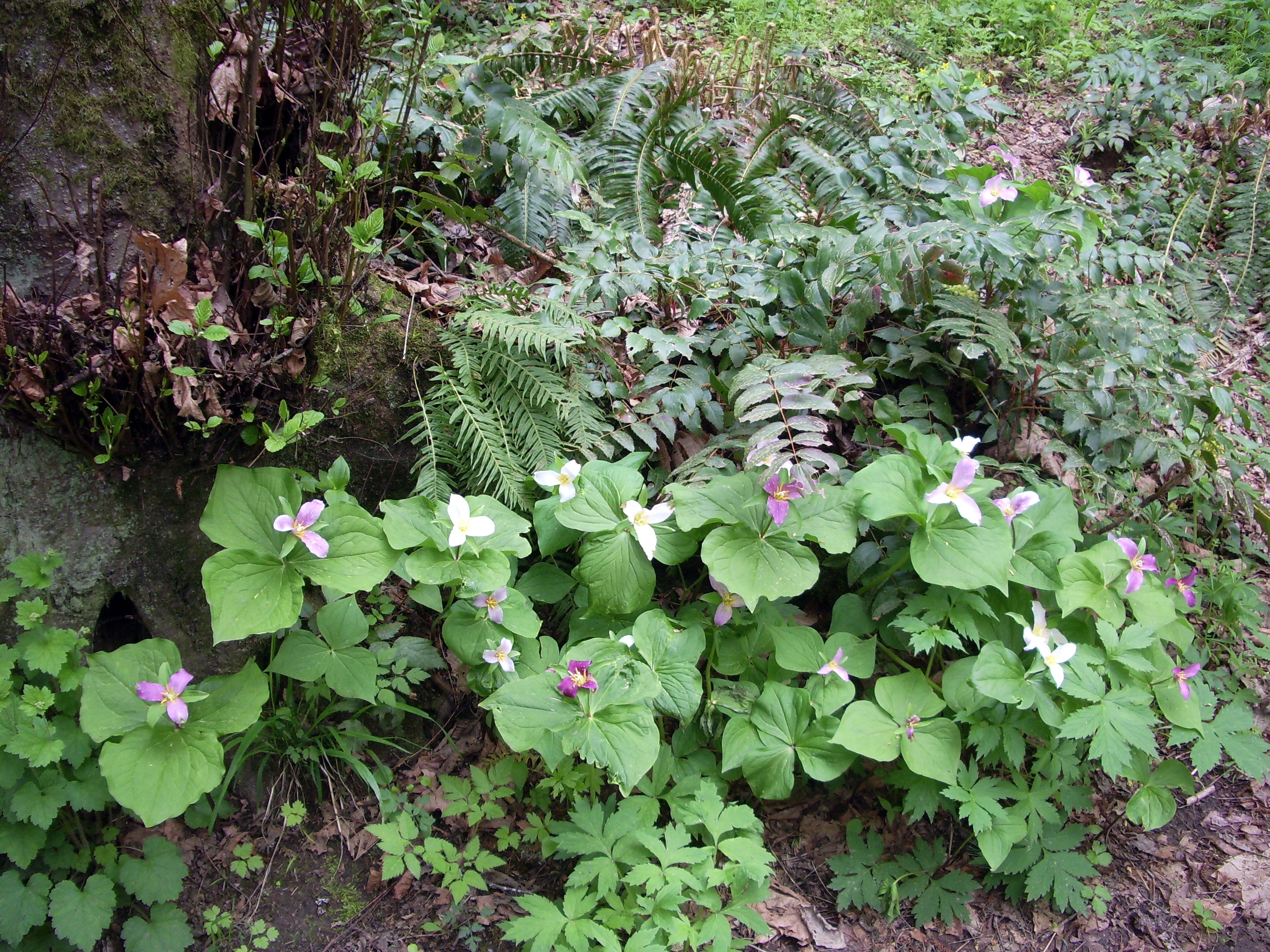
Forest Park trillium in multiple growth stages

Other parcels were acquired through government action. In 1928, the City Council's Delinquent Tax Committee transferred land to the Parks Bureau for a wildflower garden along Balch Creek. Multnomah County in that year gave the bureau perpetual use of about 145 acres (59 ha) of land north of Washington Park. Encouraged by the City Club of Portland, which conducted a park feasibility study in 1945, civic leaders supported the Forest Park project. In 1948, Multnomah County transferred to the city another 2,000 acres (810 ha) acquired through delinquent tax foreclosures. On September 23, 1948, the city formally dedicated 4,200 acres (17 km^{2}) of land as Forest Park, which as of 2009 covered more than 5,100 acres (21 km^{2}). It is one of the largest urban forest reserves in the U.S., though its exact ranking has been questioned. The city's Parks and Recreation Department claims it is the "largest forested natural area within city limits in the United States". However, an article in the Portland Tribune said Forest Park ranked no higher than third among U.S. urban forests in 2006.

In 1991, Metro, the regional governmental agency for the Oregon portion of the Portland metropolitan area, began budgeting for what became its Natural Areas Program aimed at protecting these areas in Multnomah, Washington, and Clackamas counties. By 1995, the program had targeted 320 acres (130 ha) next to or within Forest Park for acquisition. A 2006 bond measure allowed for the purchase of more land to expand the park, to protect its creeks' headwaters and those of nearby streams in Washington County, and to link Forest Park to other public lands to the northwest. In addition to purchases to directly expand the park, since 1990 the Forest Park Conservancy has acquired 14 conservation easements covering 1,160 acres (470 ha) to create a buffer of undeveloped land surrounding the park.

=== Crime and other human impacts ===
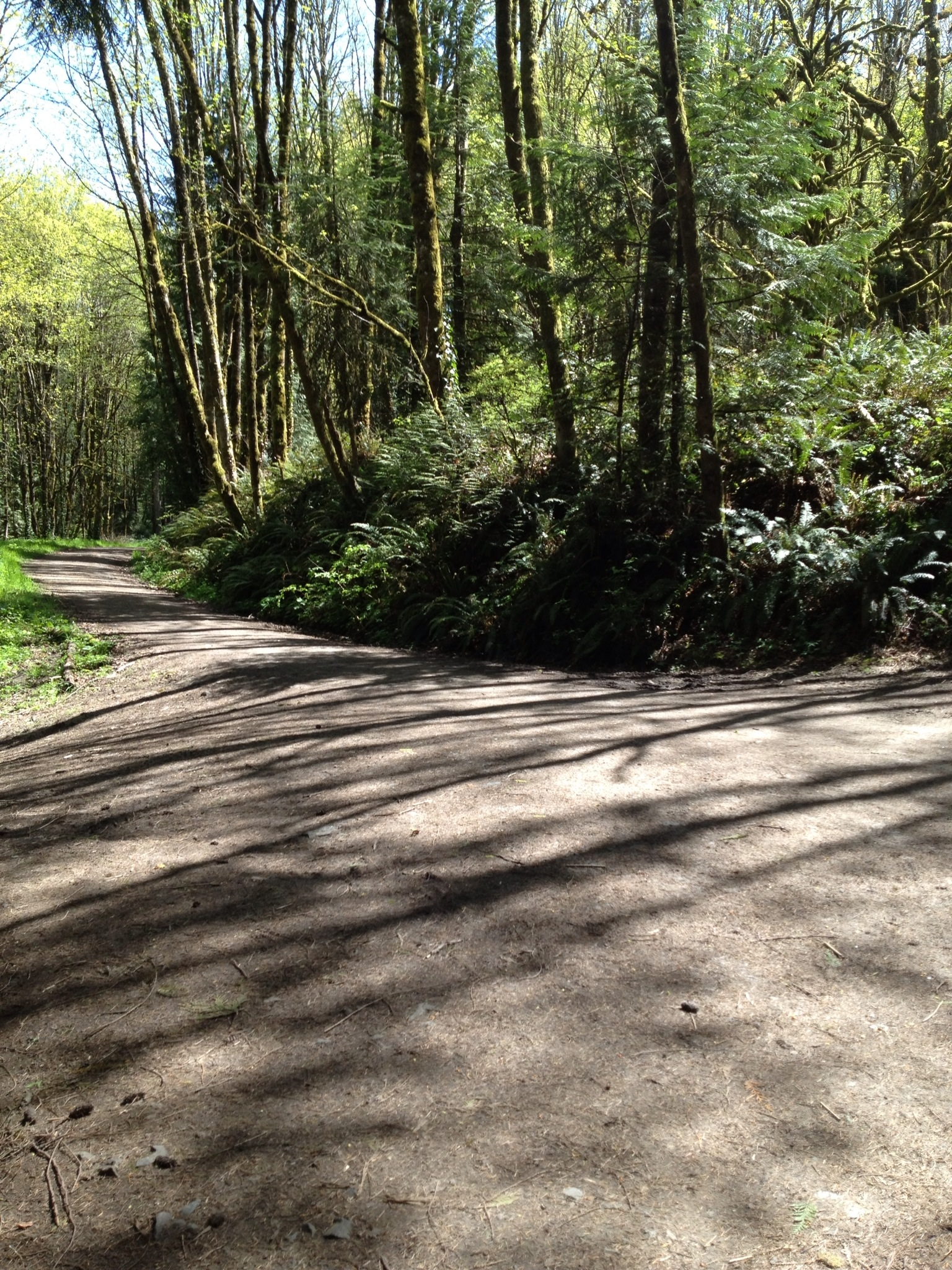
The intersection of Leif Erikson Drive and Springville Rd. inside Forest Park

Multiple crimes have occurred in Forest Park, including two murders. In 2001, Todd Alan Reed, a man who preyed on heroin addicts and prostitutes, pleaded guilty to the 1999 murders of three women whose bodies were found in Forest Park near Northwest Saltzman Road, though forensic analysis showed the murders took place elsewhere and the bodies were brought to Forest Park. In 2003, jurors convicted another man of the 1996 murder of his ex-girlfriend on a Forest Park trail. Less serious crimes have included assault (rarely), car break-ins and petty theft (frequently at trail heads), rare arsons, rare indecent exposure, and marijuana cultivation. Multnomah County Sheriff's deputies in 2007 seized 114 mature marijuana plants found growing in the park on a hillside near Portland's Linnton neighborhood. Deputies had seized another small grow operation in the park in 2005. More common has been illegal camping by homeless transients and others. An illegal bicycling trail, about 1 mile (1.6 km) long, was discovered in a remote part of the park in February 2010. In 2014, hikers found a booby trap meant to fire a shotgun shell across a path leading to the park. Portland police removed the device.

In 2004, authorities found a 53-year-old man and his 12-year-old daughter living in the park in a tarp-covered structure stocked with encyclopedias for homeschooling. They told police they had been living in the park for four years. My Abandonment, a novel by Peter Rock, tells a story built around the incident. The novel was adapted into a film, Leave No Trace (2018). Forest scenes were shot in Eagle Fern Park, near Estacada in Clackamas County.

In 1951, a drought-related blaze started by a campfire burned 1,600 acres (650 ha) near the western end of the park. In 2005, a reporter for The Oregonian newspaper interviewed biologists, conservationists, Parks and Recreation officials, and others about the health of Forest Park and its future prospects. Collectively they identified threats to the park: urban development that restricts the movement of wild animals and birds; overuse; invasive plants; loose dogs; fire risk; increasing rates of tree death; lack of rule enforcement, and lack of money. In 2010, the city hired a full-time ranger assigned to Forest Park. In 2021 and 2022, the city took additional steps to handle wildfire risk in the park, with Portland Fire & Rescue requesting additional budget to plan for mitigation, and the city designating the park plus surrounding areas a high-risk hazard zone where homeless encampments are banned during wildfire season.

== Recreational access ==
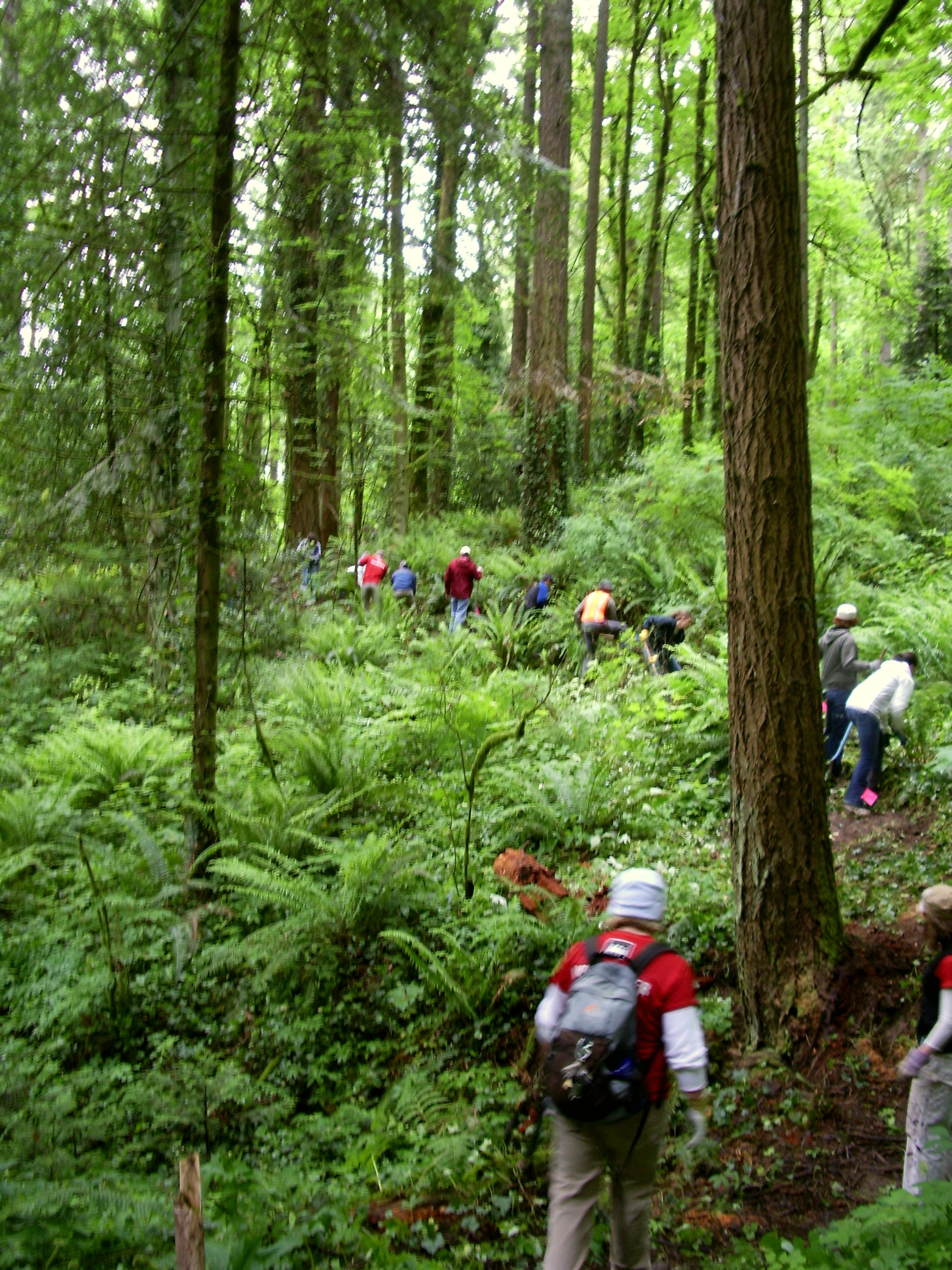
Volunteers at work on Wildwood Trail

Forest Park is a major component of a regional network of parks, trails, and natural areas managed by Metro. At the southeastern end of the park, Wildwood Trail, the centerpiece of the Forest Park trail system, passes through Macleay Park. This part of the larger park, which includes the Forest Park field headquarters, is heavily used by pedestrians entering Balch Creek Canyon from nearby city streets. Further southeast, Wildwood Trail, while still in Forest Park, passes Pittock Mansion and its panoramic views of Portland and five volcanic peaks: Mounts Rainier, Adams, St. Helens, Hood, and Jefferson. Beyond the mansion, the trail connects to adjoining Washington Park and attractions such as the Oregon Zoo via the Barbara Walker Crossing, a pedestrian bridge over Burnside Street. From here and from more remote Forest Park trailheads near the St. Johns Bridge, other components of the 40-Mile Loop system of trails encircle the city. They follow the Willamette and Columbia rivers, the Columbia Slough and the Springwater Corridor along Johnson Creek and extend to the eastern suburbs of Fairview, Gresham and Boring. This trail network links more than 30 separate parks that offer diverse recreational opportunities, such as horse-back riding, in-line skating, canoeing, and viewing of wetland wildlife, in addition to hiking and biking. It connects to other trail systems such as Discovery Trail in Clark County, Washington, and the Terwilliger Trail running through Tryon Creek State Natural Area to Lake Oswego.

As of 2015, this network of parks and trails is still expanding. Metro, the regional government, plans to link the 40-Mile Loop to trails along the Willamette River to Wilsonville, south of Lake Oswego. The regional government has also proposed connecting Wildwood Trail to the partly completed Westside Trail running north–south through Washington County to the Tualatin River. Another planned trail would extend the Springwater Corridor along a proposed Cazadero Trail to Barton on the Clackamas River. Longer-term goals include trail links to the Sandy River Gorge Trail east of Gresham and the Pacific Crest Trail, which runs from Mexico to Canada and follows the Cascade Range through Oregon.

=== Wildwood Trail ===
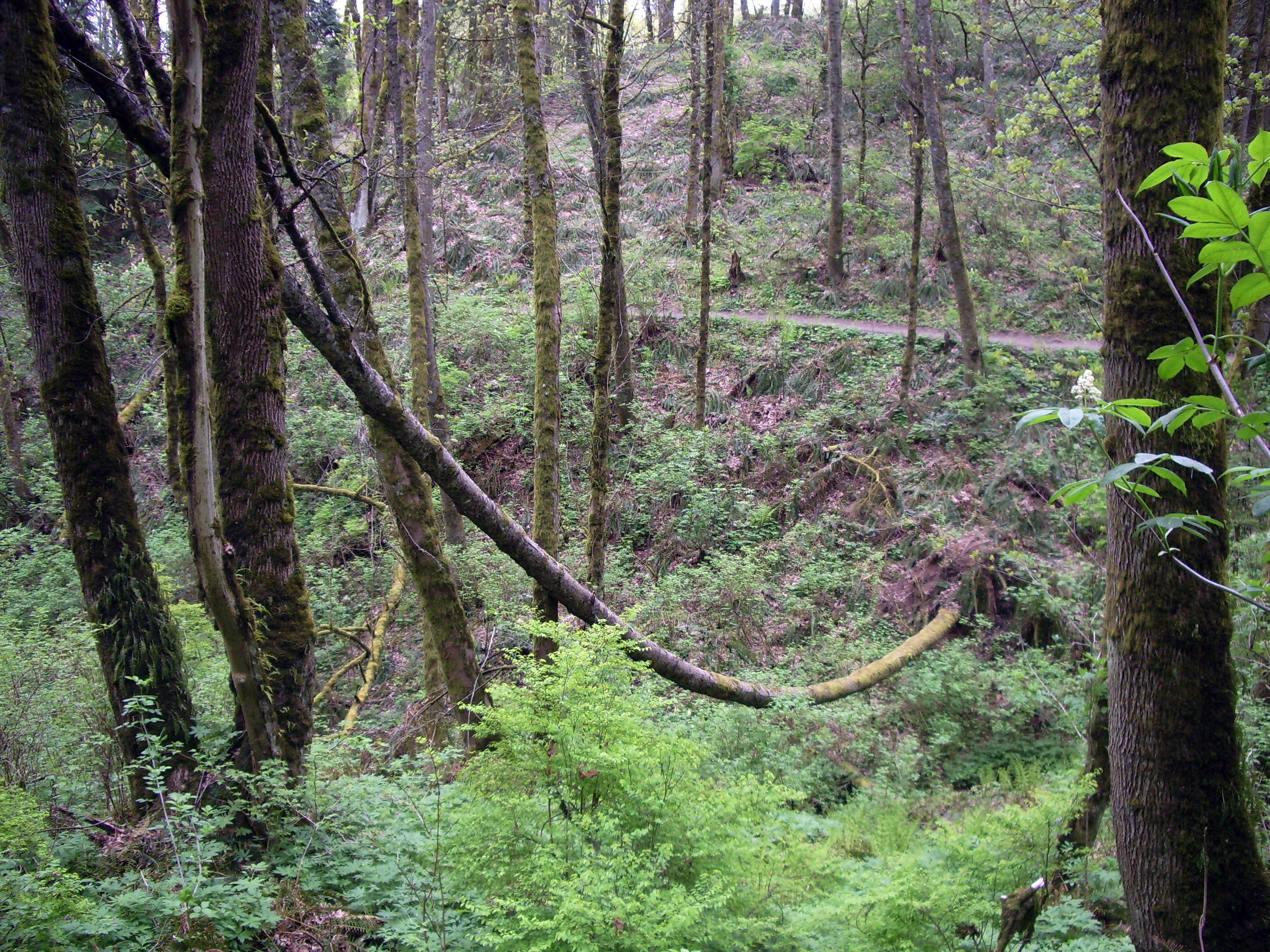
A fallen alder assumes a bow shape near Wildwood Trail.

More than 80 miles (130 km) of trails and firelanes cut through the park. The longest trail in the park is the Wildwood Trail, of which about 27 miles (43 km) is in Forest Park and about 3 miles (4.8 km) in Washington Park. It is also the longest section of the 40-Mile Loop, a trail network of roughly 150 miles (240 km) reaching many parts of the Portland metropolitan area. The trail runs southeast to northwest from trail marker 0 in Washington Park to Northwest Newberry Road, just beyond trail marker 30 on the ridge above the southeastern end of Sauvie Island. The straight-line distance from beginning to end is about 9 miles (14 km), but because the trail includes many switchbacks and hairpin turns, it is 30.2 miles (48.6 km) long. In 2019, the City of Portland constructed Barbara Walker Crossing to allow Wildwood Trail users to safely pass over West Burnside Street.

Wildwood Trail begins in Washington Park near the Oregon Zoo, a light rail stop, the Oregon Vietnam Veterans Memorial, the World Forestry Center and the Hoyt Arboretum. Blue diamonds placed about 6 feet (1.8 m) above the ground appear on trees along the trail every 0.25 miles (0.40 km). The diamonds and the mileage markers above them are visible to hikers traveling in either direction on the path. In its first 5 miles (8.0 km), the trail passes near the Portland Japanese Garden, Pittock Mansion, the Bird Alliance of Oregon wildlife sanctuary, and the Stone House in Balch Creek Canyon. From this point west, Wildwood Trail runs through forest generally uninterrupted by buildings but crisscrossed by shorter trails, small streams, roads, and firelanes.

The Wildwood Trail has become a popular route for trail and ultrarunners attempting fastest known times (FKTs). On October 9, 2025, Liam Meirow established the current one-way record for the trail, running unsupported from the north end starting at Northwest Newberry Road in 3 hours, 4 minutes, 29 seconds for the 30.2 miles. Meirow's attempt came 11 days after completing a 50k race, and he carried all his hydration and nutrition during the effort. On July 1, 2025, Ajay Hanspal set the current out-and-back record, completing the 60-mile round trip from the Vietnam Memorial to Northwest Newberry Road and back in 8 hours, 4 minutes, 57 seconds. Hanspal's supported effort included a rotating team of pacers and crew support at multiple road crossings, helping him navigate hot conditions and approximately 6,000 feet of elevation gain.

=== Other paths, streets, easements ===
Many shorter Forest Park trails, roads, and firelanes intersect the Wildwood Trail. Most of the trails are open only to hikers and runners, but several roads and firelanes are open to bicycles or horses or both. Leif Erikson Drive, a road closed to motorized traffic, runs at lower elevation than and roughly parallel to the Wildwood Trail for about 11 miles (18 km) from the end of Northwest Thurman Street to Northwest Germantown Road. Originally called Hillside Drive, it was renamed in 1933 at the request of the Sons of Norway, a fraternal organization. Easements for an oil line, a gas line, and electric transmission lines for the Bonneville Power Administration (BPA) cross the park. Paved roads surround the park, which is crossed or entered by other roads including Northwest Pittock Drive, Northwest Cornell Road, Northwest 53rd Drive, Northwest Saltzman Road, Northwest Springville Road, Northwest Germantown Road, Northwest Newton Road, and BPA Road.

=== Nature Center ===
In 2024, Portland Parks & Recreation opened a new entrance to the park and a parking lot located at the intersection of St. Helens Road and US 30, at the trailhead for Firelane 1 trail. Future plans for a visitors center, known as the Forest Park Nature Center, are in development.

== Conservation and threats ==
In February 2025, the city of Portland approved Portland General Electric’s plan for the Harborton Reliability Project, which will remove two wetlands and clear 376 living Oregon White Oak and Douglas Fir trees over 4.7 acres in Forest Park, creating space for new power lines. The Bird Alliance of Oregon and Portland Parks & Recreation were among organizations opposed to the project.

== Reception ==
The park won in the Best Park category of Willamette Week's annual 'Best of Portland' readers' poll in 2025.

== Works cited ==
- Bishop, Ellen Morris (2003). In Search of Ancient Oregon: A Geological and Natural History. Portland, Oregon: Timber Press. ISBN 978-0-88192-789-4.
- Houck, Michael C.; Cody, M. J. (2000). Wild in the City: A Guide to Portland's Natural Areas. Portland: Oregon Historical Society Press. ISBN 0-87595-273-9.
- Houle, Marcy Cottrell (1996). One City's Wilderness: Portland's Forest Park (2nd ed.). Portland: Oregon Historical Society Press. ISBN 0-87595-284-4.
- Thayer, James D. (2008). Portland Forest Hikes: Twenty Close-In Wilderness Walks. Portland: Timber Press. ISBN 978-0-88192-857-0.
