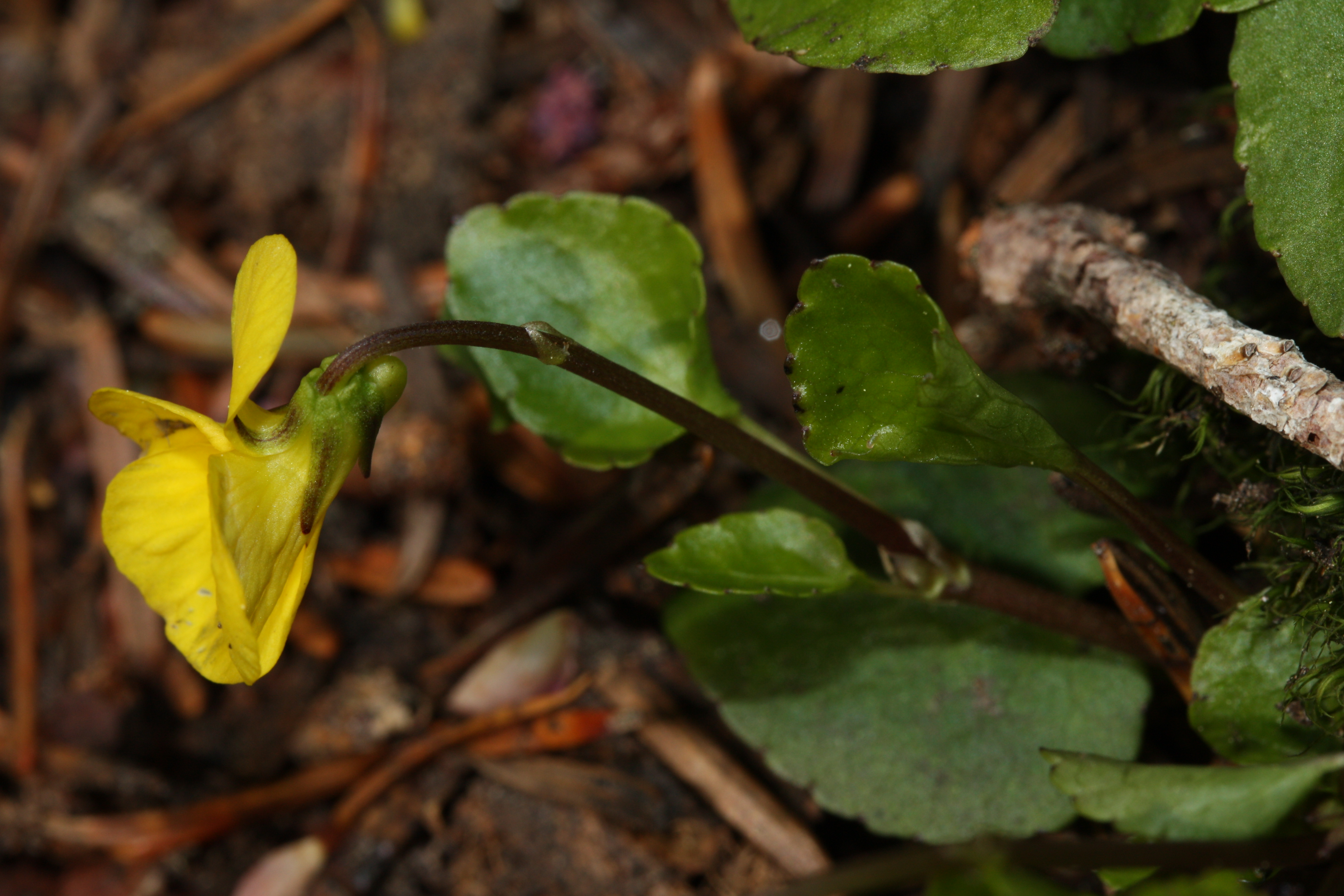
- V. sempervirens in Mount Baker-Snoqualmie National Forest

Conservation status
- Secure (NatureServe)

Scientific classification
- Kingdom: Plantae
- Clade: Tracheophytes
- Clade: Angiosperms
- Clade: Eudicots
- Clade: Rosids
- Order: Malpighiales
- Family: Violaceae
- Genus: Viola
- Species: V. sempervirens

Binomial name
- Viola sempervirens Greene

= Viola sempervirens =

Species of flowering plant

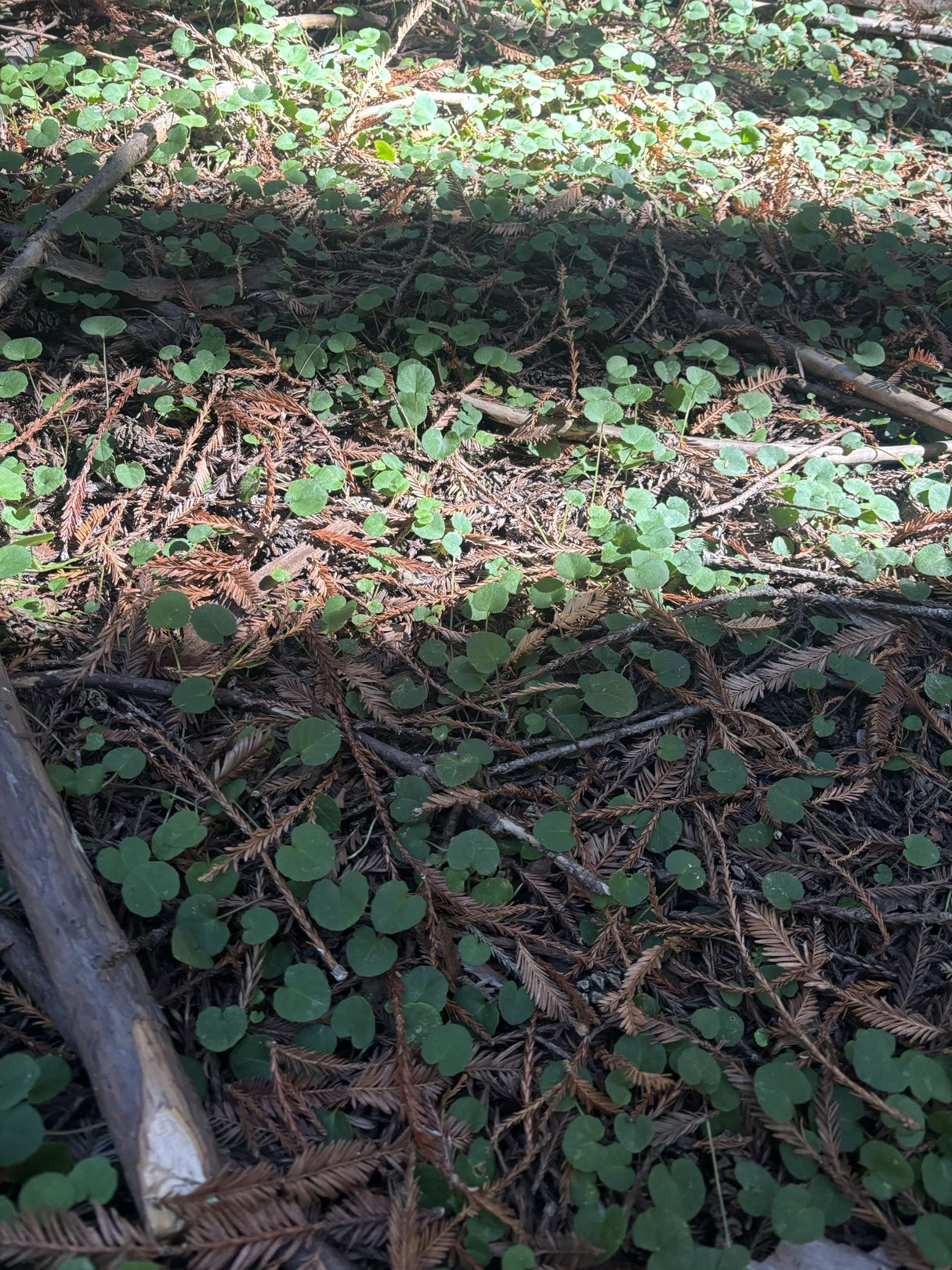
Redwood Violets growing densely in fallen Redwood tree material.

Viola sempervirens, known by the common names redwood violet and evergreen violet, is a species in the genus Viola. It is native to the West Coast of the United States and British Columbia, Canada, and grows in closed-cone pine forest, California mixed evergreen forest, Douglas fir forest communities, and very frequently redwood forests.

It is a small herbaceous plant that has leathery purple-spotted green leaves and bright yellow flowers. Often found in wetter regions under tree cover. It blooms in late winter and spring.

== Description ==
Redwood violets are perennial herbs that grow to heights of about 5 cm (10 in).

Leaves are simple, leathery to touch, and about 1-3 cm (1 in) in length. They are cordate-ovate in shape, and are basal, growing from stems attached to the base of the plant.

Flowers have 5 petals, and are bright-yellow to gold in color, with red-purple streaks growing at the base of the bottom 3 petals, with only 1 flower blooming per plant. Each petal can reach only about 5-15 mm (~0.5 in). The blooming period is typically between March and June.

== Distribution and habitat ==
Redwood Violets are native to the west coast of North America, having been identified South of Monterey and stretching past Vancouver. The plant is still found in these locations in modern times, generally seen growing within 100km of the coast at lower elevations.

Its preferred habitat is within moist evergreen forests, most often redwood forests, from which it received its common name. These plants can often be seen growing densely along trails and places of mild disturbance in these forests, with a preference towards the shaded regions underneath larger trees.

== Conservation ==
As of December 2024, the conservation group NatureServe listed Viola sempervirens as Secure (G5) worldwide. This status was last reviewed on 17 October 2019. At the state and provincial levels in the United States and Canada, this species is listed as No Status Rank (not assessed) in California, Oregon, and Washington; Secure (S5) in British Columbia, Vulnerable (S3) in Idaho, and Critically Imperiled (S1) in Alaska.
