= Stone House (Portland, Oregon) =

Abandoned structure in Portland, Oregon's Forest Park

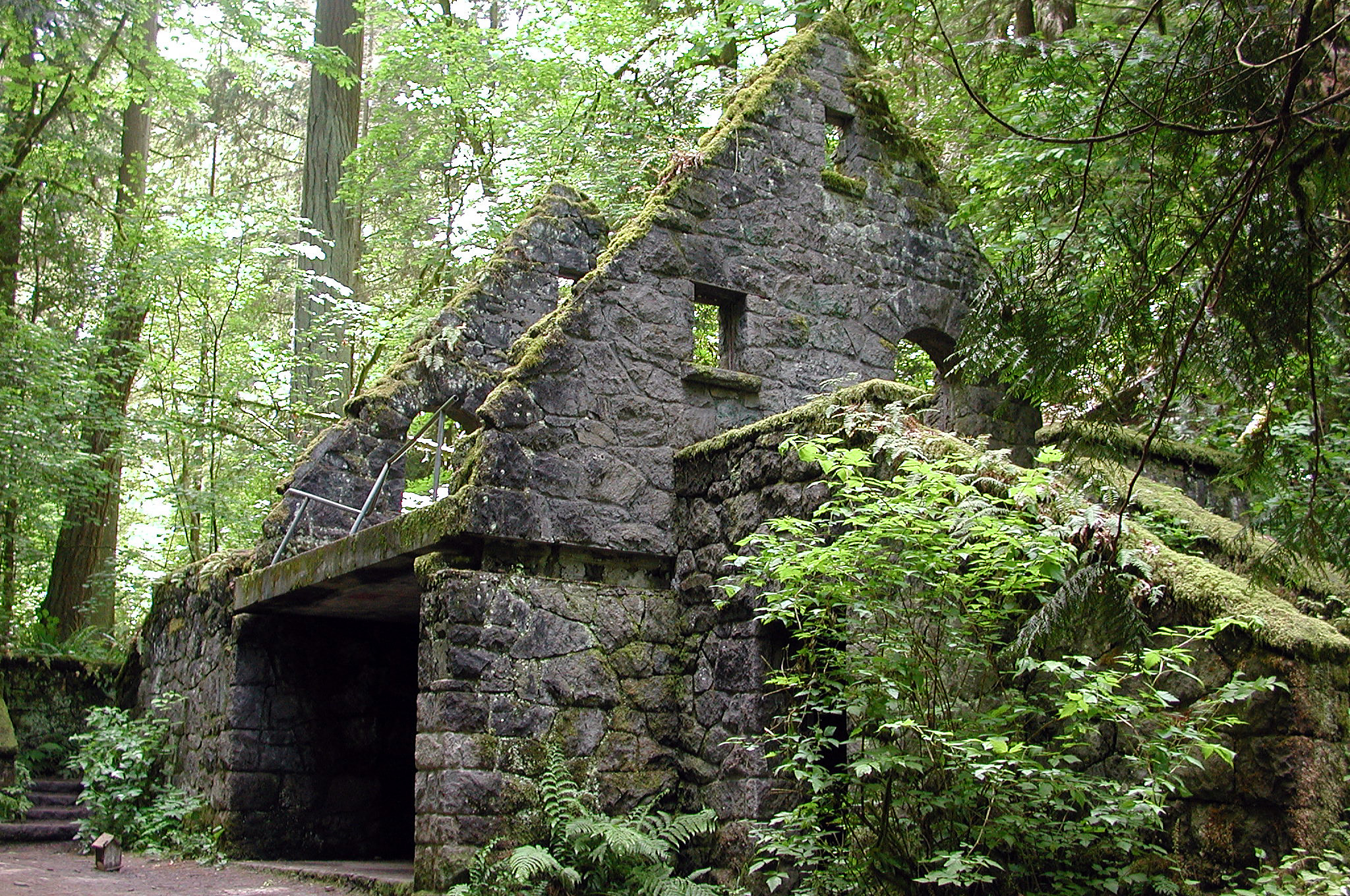
- The stone structure in 2008
- Interactive map of the Stone House area
- Alternative names: Macleay Park Shelter; Witch's Castle; Witches Castle

General information
- Type: unmaintained; Public toilet; pavilion; storage
- Location: Forest Park, Portland, Oregon, United States
- Coordinates: 45.52829°N 122.72507°W
- Elevation: 328 feet (100 m)
- Completed: 1935–1936

The Stone House, also known as the Macleay Park Shelter and the Witch's Castle or Witches Castle, is a two-story structure in Portland, Oregon's Forest Park, in the United States.

== Description and history ==
The Bureau of Parks commissioned architect Ernest F. Tucker to design the public toilet, pavilion, and storage room in 1929. The Works Progress Administration structure was completed during 1935–1936. The water line to the restroom was destroyed during the Columbus Day Storm of 1962. City officials opted not to fund repairs.

The structure has been a target for graffiti. In 2015, Erik Henriksen of the Portland Mercury said the Stone House "looks like Tolkien-esque ruins, if Middle-earth had taggers", and Thrillist's Mattie John Bamman described the abandoned structure as "filled with Satanic graffiti". Graffiti was removed in 2016. Alie Kilts of Willamette Week wrote in 2017, "just try not to get spooked when you stumble upon the ominous stone house".

In 2017, a local news reporter described a tradition among some Lincoln High School students to celebrate the last day of school by throwing parties with alcohol and drugs at the Stone House, which students refer to as "Witches". Kale Williams included the Stone House in The Oregonian's 2017 list of the sixteen "coolest and creepiest abandoned places" in the Pacific Northwest. Williams described the structure as a popular resting spot for hikers and wrote, "For better or worse, the so-called Witches Castle is periodically covered in graffiti, but it's still a sight to behold."

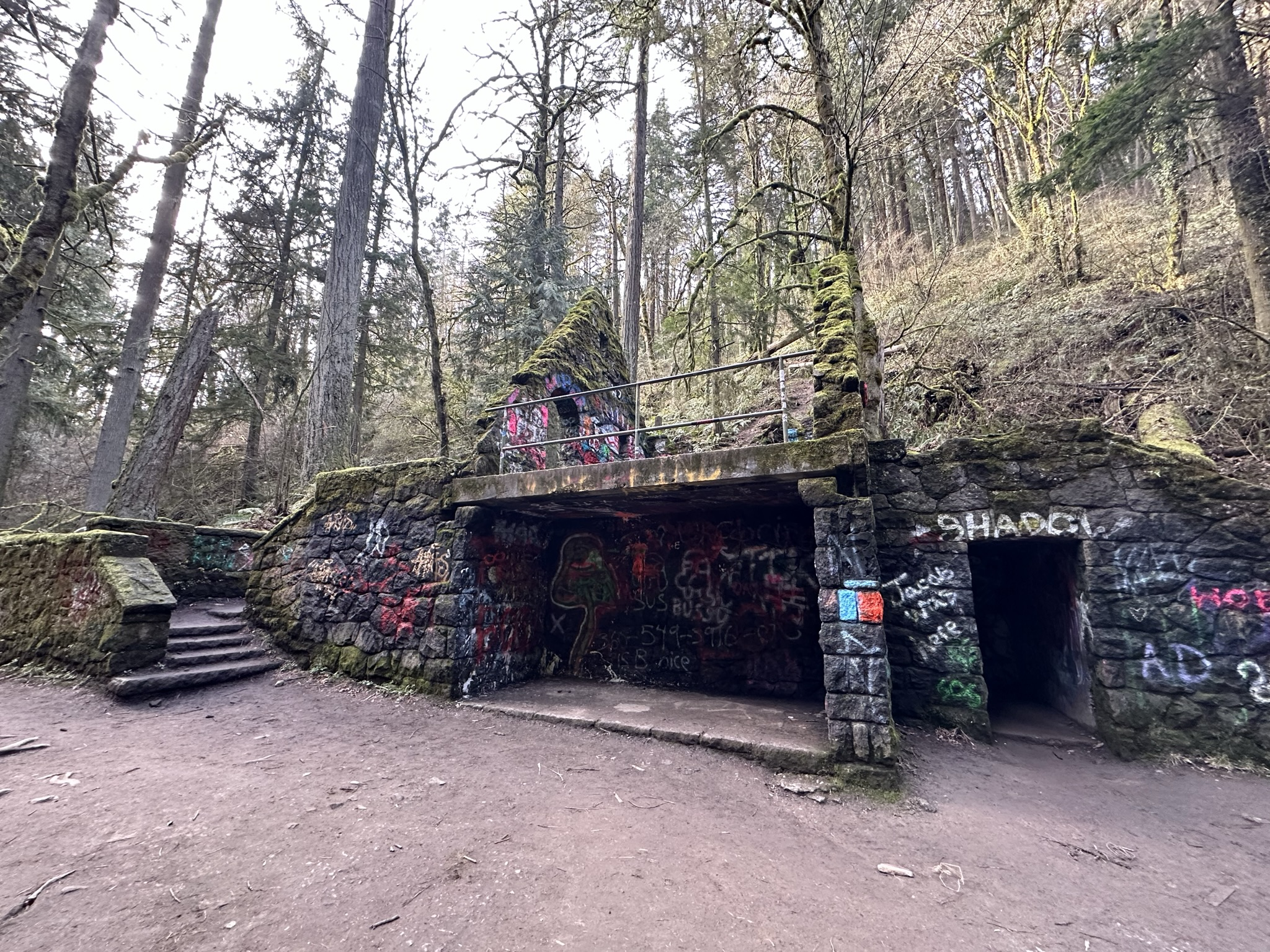
Stone House in 2023, covered with graffiti

In 2018, The Oregonian's Jamie Hale described the structure as an often photographed "ruined stone building now covered with graffiti". Kathleen Marie of the Portland Mercury wrote, "Forest Park is in its prime each summer, and it's a disservice to yourself, your friends, and your family if all that you ever show them in the park is that broken-ass stone house that's actually just a vandalized 1930s public restroom." Parade's Scott Steinberg described the Stone House as a "gnome home-esque structure... covered in bright green moss" in 2017. "Its lichen-coated walls make a killer fort for an afternoon", wrote Portland Monthly's Brian Barker in 2020.

In 2022, author and religious scholar Jahan Brian Ihsan published Portland Witch House, including photographs and stories of the Stone House alongside a twelve-year photographic study of 'countercultural' personae who engaged in outsider religion and ritual.
