= 1907–08 Oregon Agricultural Aggies women's basketball team =

American college basketball season

The 1907-08 OAC women's basketball team.

The 1907–08 Oregon Agricultural Aggies women's basketball team represented Oregon Agricultural College (OAC, today's Oregon State University) during the 1907–08 academic year. It was the tenth academic year in which an organized women's team played games on behalf of OAC.

The team was independent of any organized athletic conference and scheduled its games on an ad hoc basis.

The team finished its season with a record of 6 wins and 2 losses.

== Roster ==
The following were members of the 1906–07 OAC women's team:

=== Starters ===
- Cleva Perry (forward)
- Myrtle Harrington (forward)
- Kate Moore (center)
- Mamie Scoggin (guard)
- Grace Starr (guard)

=== Reserves ===
- Zeta Johnson (guard)

== Schedule and results ==
Date time, TV	Rank^{#}	Opponent^{#}	Result	Record	Site city, state
1907–08 Season
January 25, 1908		Silverton High School	W 17–13	1-0	Silverton, Oregon
February 15, 1908		Drain Normal School	W 17–9	2–0	Drain, Oregon
March 6, 1908		Albany High School	L 6–14	2–1	Albany, Oregon
March 7, 1908		Chemawa Indian School	L 4–21	2–2	Chemawa, Oregon
March 13, 1908		Chemawa Indian School	W 9–6	3–2	Corvallis, Oregon
March 21, 1908		Drain Normal School	W 34–3	4–2	Corvallis, Oregon
March 27, 1908		Oregon State Normal School	W 23–8	5–2	Corvallis, Oregon
April 4, 1908		Oregon State Normal School	W 12–11	6–2	Monmouth, Oregon
*Non-conference game. ^{#}Rankings from AP Poll. (#) Tournament seedings in parentheses.
