= Scott Gragg =

American football player (born 1972)

No. 74, 78, 75
- Position: Offensive tackle

Personal information
- Born: February 28, 1972 (age 54); Silverton, Oregon, U.S.
- Listed height: 6 ft 8 in (2.03 m)
- Listed weight: 315 lb (143 kg)

Career information
- High school: Silverton
- College: Montana
- NFL draft: 1995: 2nd round, 54th overall pick

Career history
- New York Giants (1995–1999); San Francisco 49ers (2000–2004); New York Jets (2005)

Career NFL statistics
- Games played: 172
- Games started: 149
- Fumble recoveries: 7
- Stats at Pro Football Reference

Christopher Scott Gragg (born February 28, 1972) is an American former professional football player who was an offensive tackle in the National Football League (NFL). He played college football for the Montana Grizzlies, where he majored in mathematics and made 82 knockdown blocks while grading 89 percent for blocking consistency as a senior. He was selected by the New York Giants in the 1995 NFL draft and later played for the San Francisco 49ers and New York Jets.

He coached varsity football and taught math at his alma mater Silverton High School from 2006 to 2010. Scott earned his Master of Arts in Teaching degree in 2008 at George Fox University. He became the tight ends coach and recruiting coordinator at his other alma mater, the University of Montana, in 2010.

He became principal at McNary High School in Keizer, Oregon on August 3, 2023, and has continued working there since. He was previously an assistant principal and athletic director at McNary High School.
