= Silver Falls School District =

School district in Oregon, United States

Silver Falls School District is a school district in the U.S. State of Oregon that serves the communities of Scotts Mills and Silverton in Marion County and Clackamas County, as well as the surrounding foothills along Silver Creek and the Abiqua River up to Silver Falls State Park. It is approximately 240 square miles (620 km^{2}) in size. The current Interim Superintendent is Paul Peterson.

== School board ==
Board officers are elected annually, and terms begin and end during summer break. Terms last for four years, and elections are staggered so that no more than four positions become open at a time.

=== Board members ===
- Janet Allanach, Zone 1
- Owen Von Flue, Zone 2
- Lori McLaughlin, Zone 3
- Jennifer Traeger, Zone 4 Vice Chair person
- Aaron Koch, Zone 5
- Jonathan Edmonds, Zone 6 Chair person
- Tom Bucholz, Zone 7

== Demographics ==
In the 2017-18 school year, the district had 3,881 students. Of those students, 80% were white, 3% multiracial, 1% American Indian, Asian, Black or Native Hawaiian, 15% were Hispanic, and 12% classified as Ever English Learners, there were 16 languages spoken and 14% of students had disabilities, 37% of students received free or reduced price lunch according to the Department of Education.

== Schools ==
There are currently thirteen schools in the district.

=== Elementary Schools (K-5) ===
- Mark Twain Elementary
- Robert Frost Elementary

=== K-8 and Middle (6-8) Schools ===
- Butte Creek Elementary (K-8)
- Central Howell Elementary (K-8)
- Pratum Elementary (K-8)
- Scotts Mills Elementary (K-8)
- Silver Crest Elementary (K-8)
- Silverton Middle School (6-8)

=== High School (9-12) ===
- Silverton High School
