= Oregon Garden =

Botanical garden in Silverton, Oregon

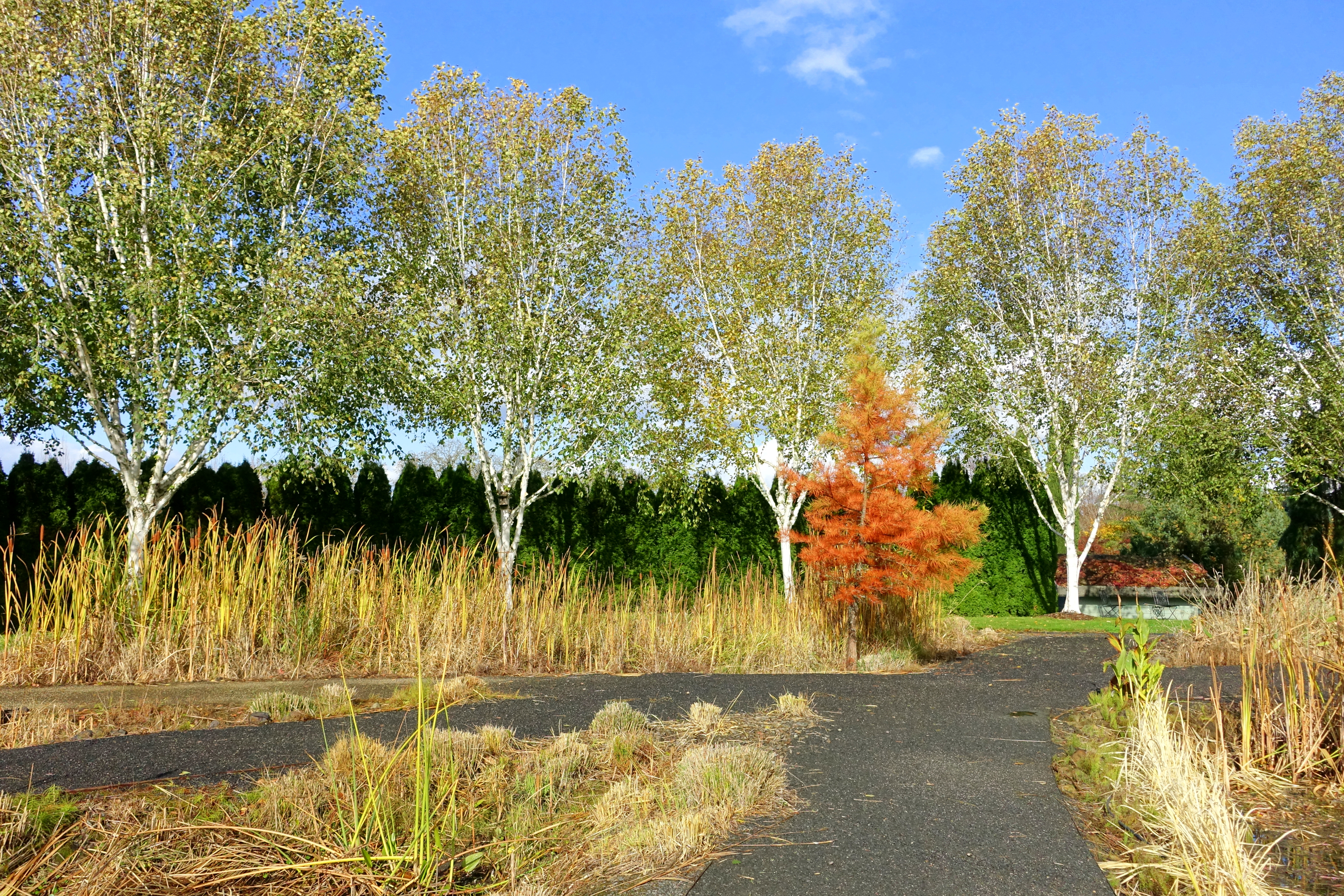
- A walking path in one of the many gardens.
- Interactive map of Oregon Garden
- Type: Botanical garden
- Location: 879 West Main Street; Silverton, Oregon, United States
- Coordinates: 44°59′42″N 122°47′24″W
- Area: 130 acres (53 ha)
- Created: April 17, 1999
- Operator: The Oregon Garden Foundation
- Visitors: 100,000+ a year.
- Open: Open all year.
- Website: oregongarden.org

The Oregon Garden is a 130-acre (53 ha) botanical garden in Silverton, Oregon, United States. Opened in 1999, it is home to over 20 gardens including the Rose Garden, Children's Garden and Silverton Market Garden. The garden is open year-round and hosts both public and private events. The land is also home to the Gordon House, Oregon's only Frank Lloyd Wright home, and The Oregon Garden Resort.

== History ==
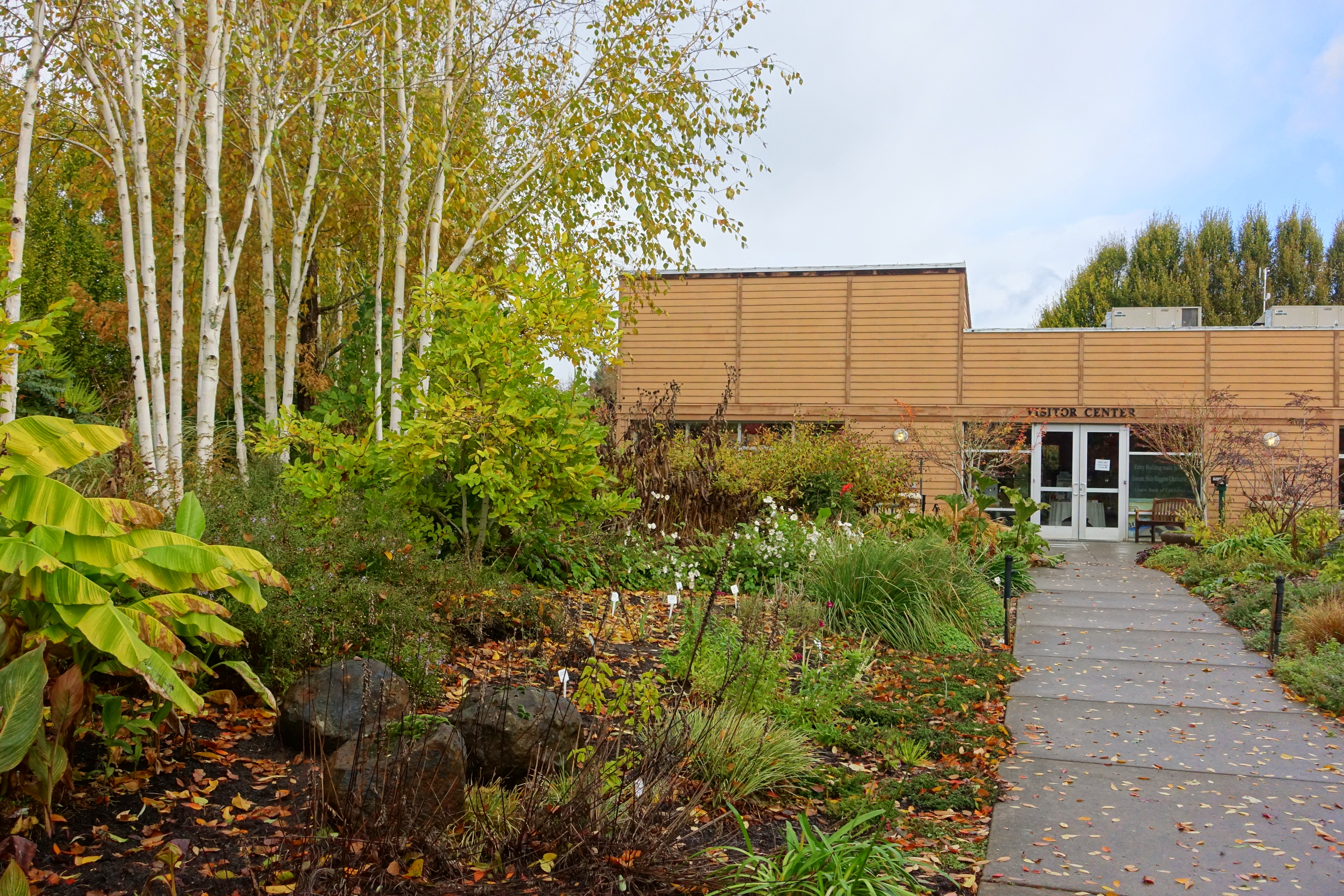
Visitor Center.

The Oregon Association of Nurseries first conceived the idea of a public showcase garden in the 1940s. Work towards the creation of such a garden began in earnest around 1990, when the OAN began seeking a location for their project. Around that same time, the City of Silverton was searching for a way to use their reclaimed wastewater. These serendipitous situations led Silverton to purchase the land south of downtown and dedicate it to the future garden in 1995. As a result, Silverton's wastewater is filtered through a series of terraced wetlands located in the garden, collected in a holding tank and used to meet all of the garden's irrigation needs. In April 1996, a master plan was created for the garden which includes ultimately developing all 240 acres (0.97 km^{2}) of the site.

The groundbreaking ceremony occurred June 27, 1997, and featured high-ranking Oregon politicians. (Note: The dedication speech was given by former U.S. Senator Mark O. Hatfield. The first soil was turned by U.S. Representative Darlene Hooley.) The garden opened to the public during a dedication on April 17, 1999. Attendance at the garden totaled 250,000 visitors the first year. Subsequent ceremonies dedicated additional features such as the Gordon House on March 2, 2002, and the Rediscovery Forest and Natural Resources Center on June 7, 2002. In 2002, the water garden won an award from the American Society of Landscape Architects for environmental friendliness.

== Features ==
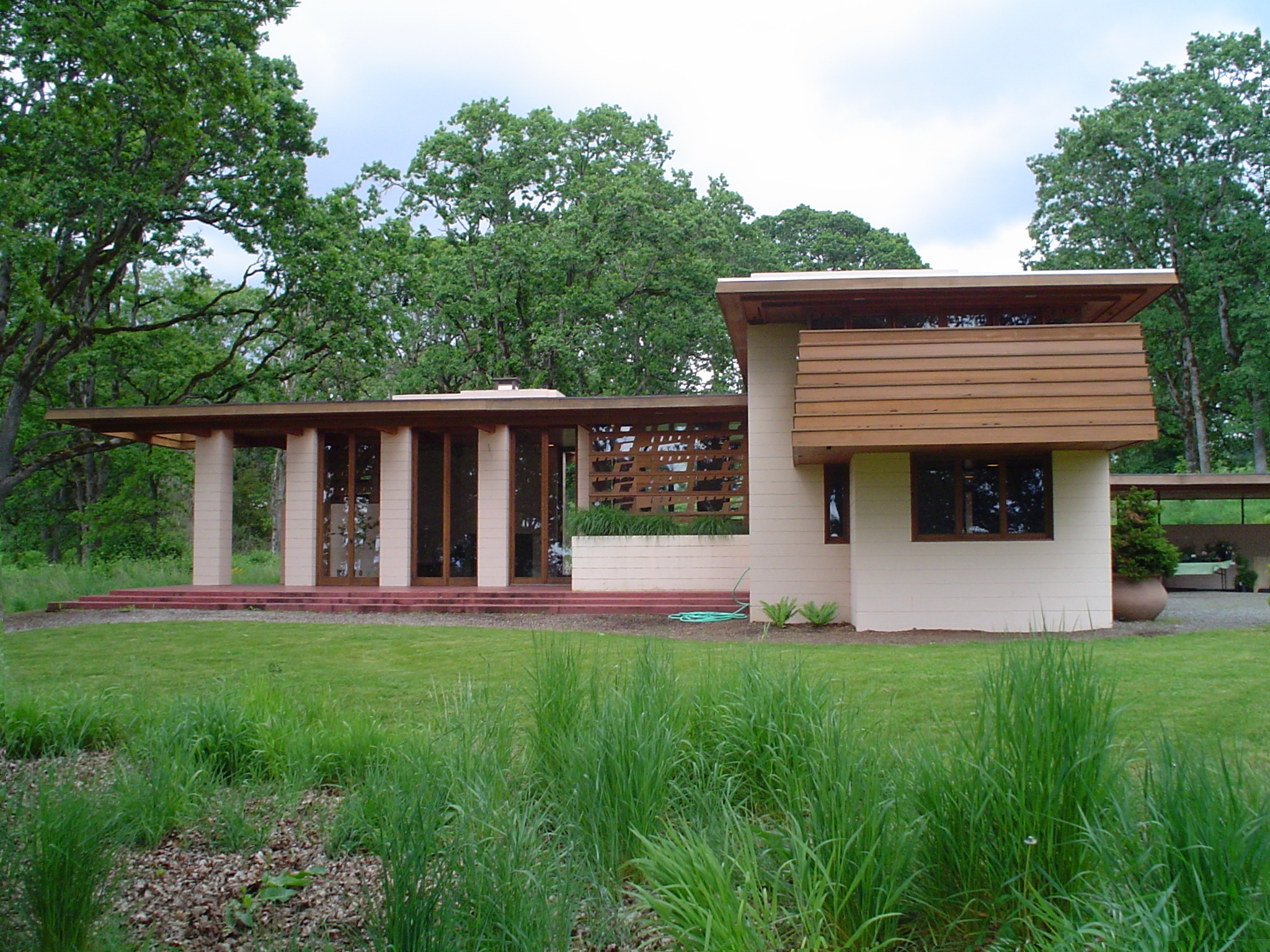
The Gordon House, a house by Frank Lloyd Wright, was almost demolished. Many organizations and members of the community worked to save the house by raising funds to have the house relocated to the Oregon Garden grounds.

As of 2025, the Oregon Garden includes more than twenty specialty gardens and features such as the Bosque, Children's Garden, Conifer Garden (one of the largest collections of dwarf and miniature conifers in the United States), Honor Garden, Hughes Water Garden, Jackson & Perkins Rose Garden, Lewis & Clark Garden, Northwest Garden, Pet Friendly Garden, and Sensory Garden. The water garden is a maze-like area with numerous paths and bridges. A 25-acre (100,000 m^{2}) native Oregon white oak grove includes the 400-year-old, 100-foot (30 m) Signature Oak, which is one of Oregon's Heritage Trees. The garden holds an annual festival each autumn. Also on the grounds is the Teufel Amphitheater which hosts concerts and other events; Sam Bush played in the Amphitheater in 2006.

Gordon House, the only house Frank Lloyd Wright designed in Oregon, is now on the grounds of Oregon Garden. The house, designed in 1957, is one of Wright's Usonian houses, and the only Wright house open to the public in the Pacific Northwest. Completed in 1964, the home was moved from Wilsonville, Oregon, to the garden in 2001.

On each Earth Day since 1999, the Garden hosts a celebration which attracts environmental supporters and organizations with demonstrations, exhibitions, and workshops. Garden admission is free for this event.

Using treated wastewater from the city, the garden is one of only a few installations in the United States that reuses wastewater for a water feature. Even in the summer months, the garden does not draw on drinking water supplies, instead relying entirely on wastewater treatment plant effluent, which additionally irrigates 240 acres (0.97 km^{2}) of farmland. Until recently, such use was prohibited by state law, but the law was revised partly due to this water reclamation project. The garden also provides wetland mitigation for a nearby industrial park to provide waterfowl and amphibian habitat, and offloads Silver Creek from water it would not naturally carry during low-flow months in the summer to address an Oregon Department of Environmental Quality requirement. The wastewater receives final treatment on about 16 acres (65,000 m^{2}) of the Oregon Garden where a series of 25 ponds perform three final filtering functions. The end result is extremely high quality treated water.

== Gallery ==
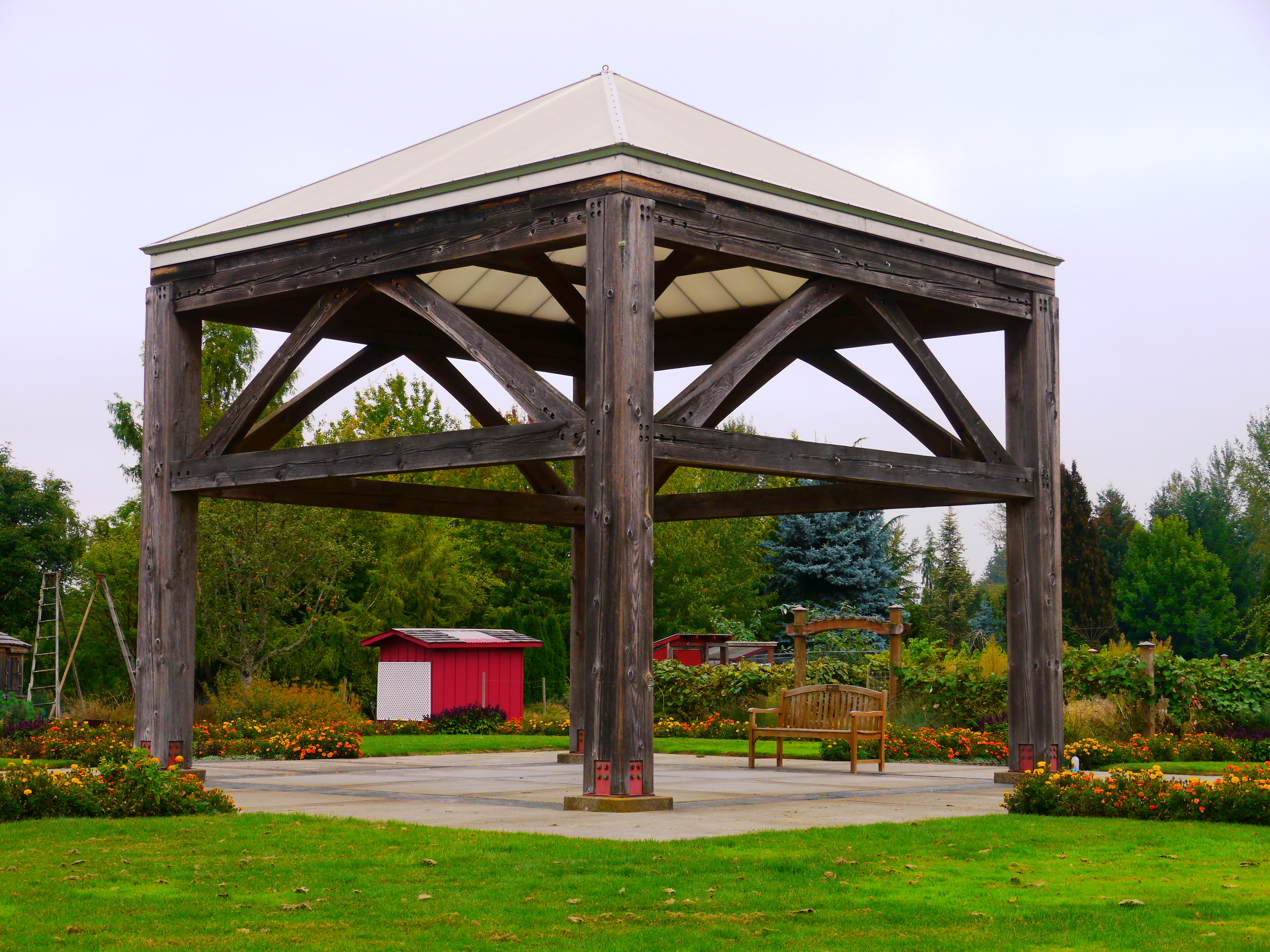
The original Founder's Pavilion (replaced in 2024).

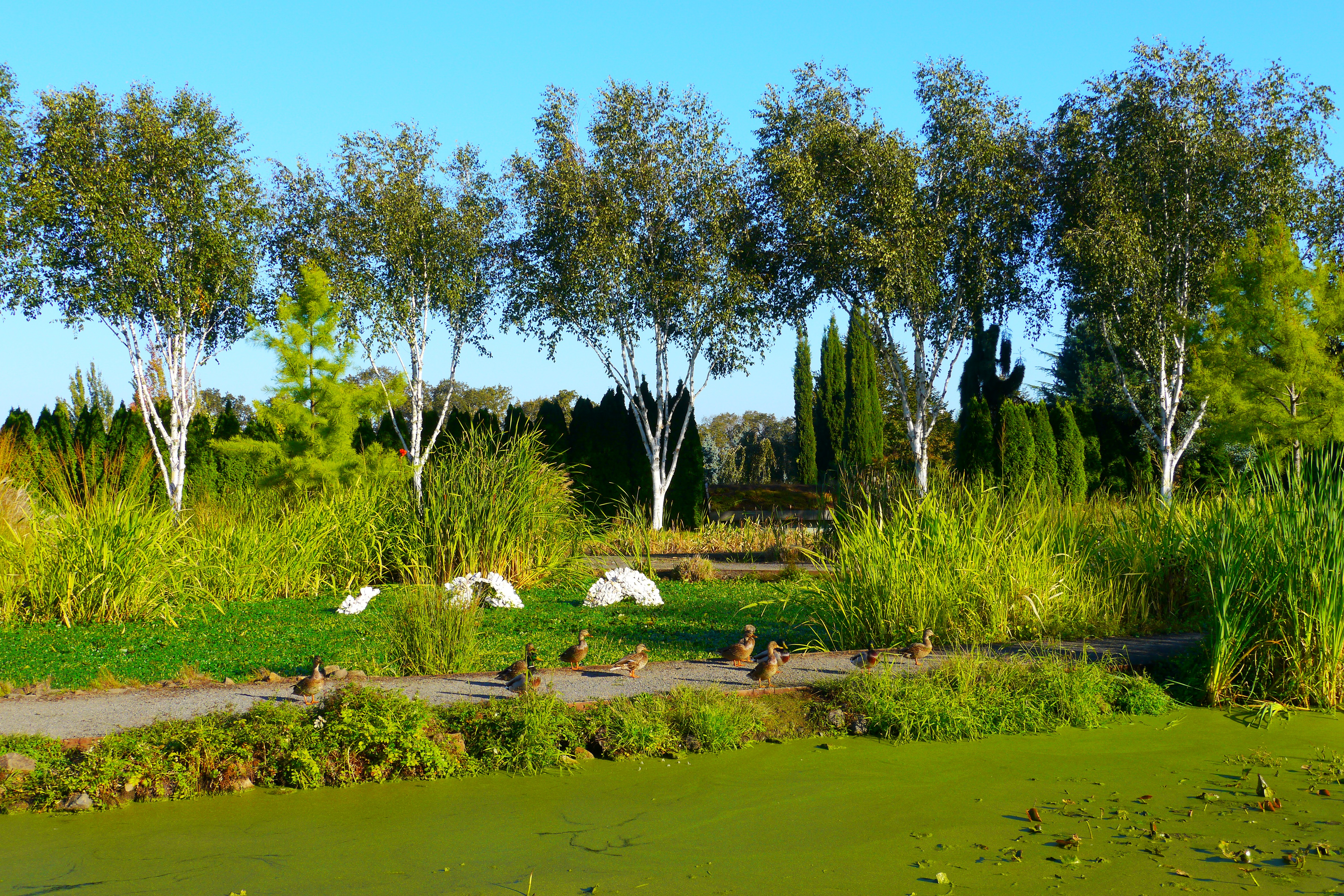
Ducks in the A-mazing Water Garden

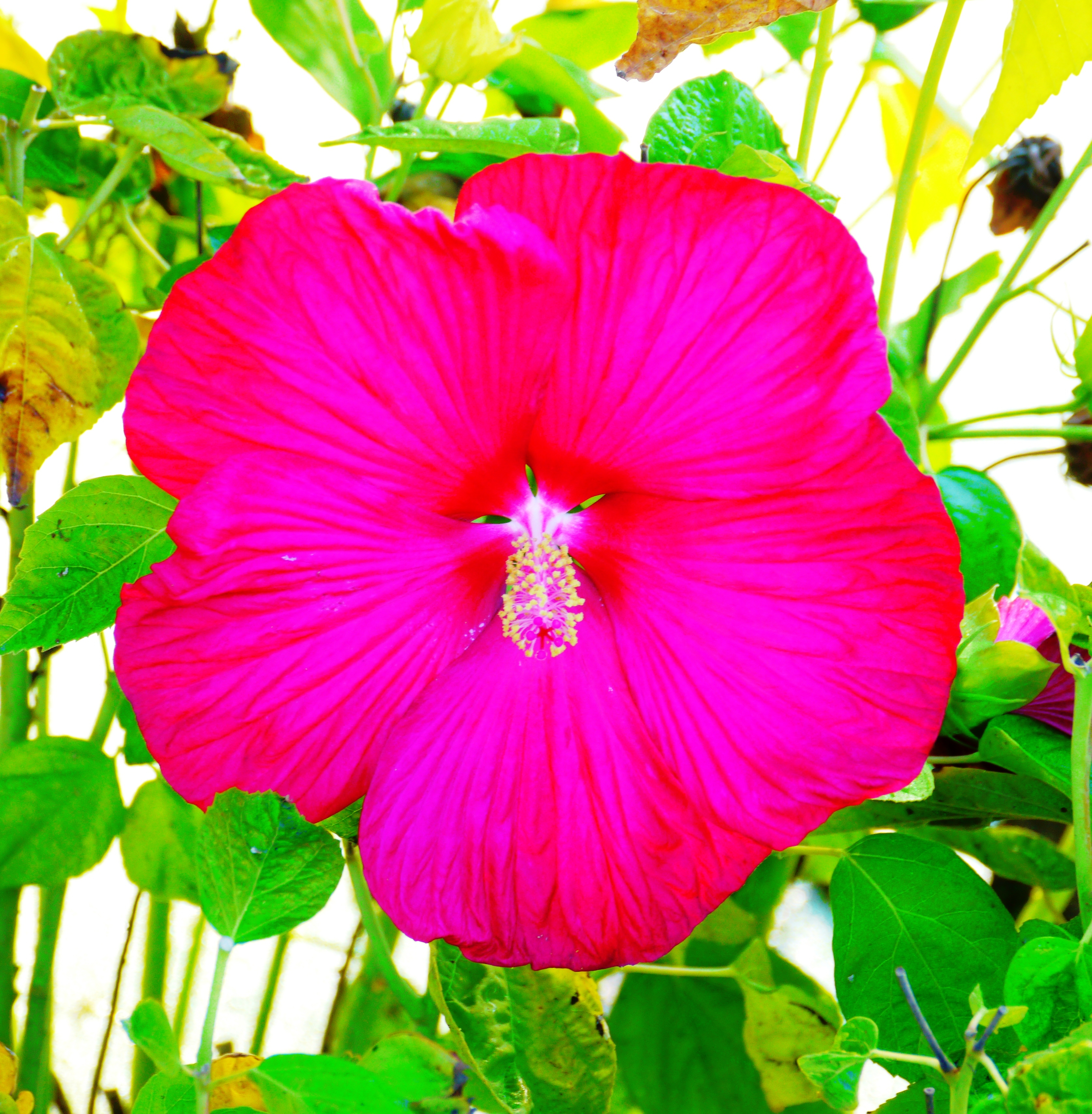
One of the many flowers in the garden.

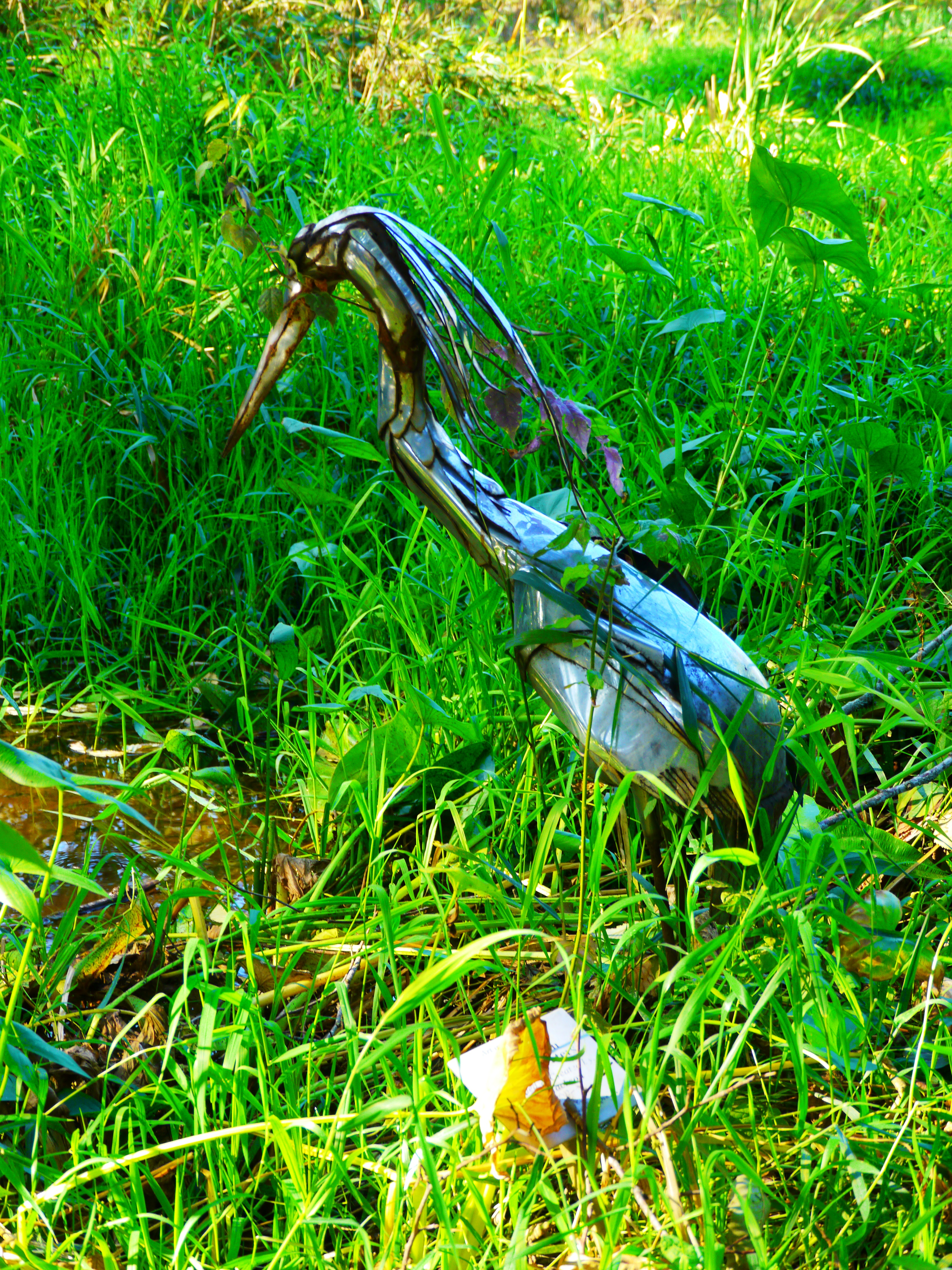
Artwork in the Secret Garden

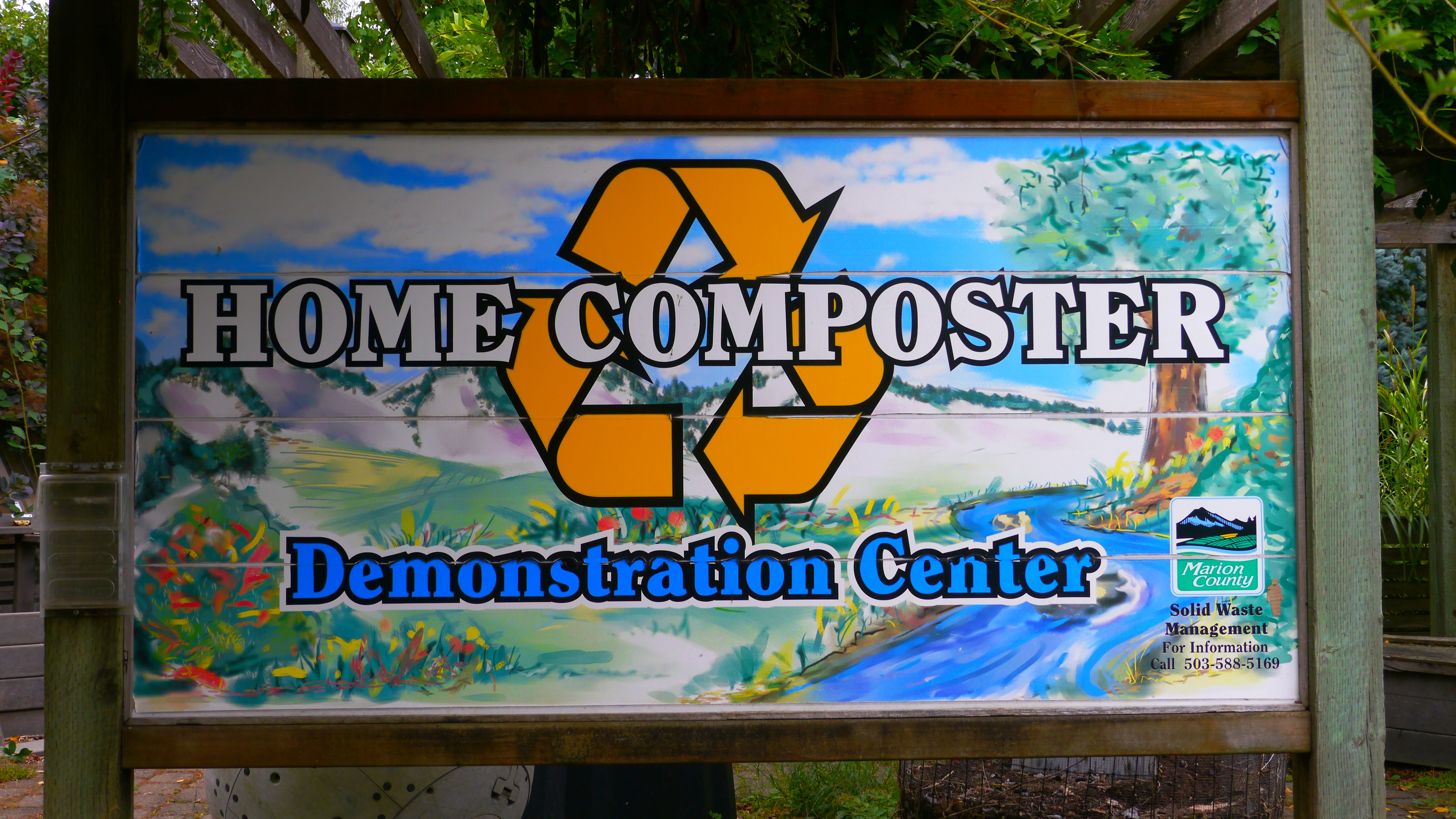
Many different educational centers onsite.

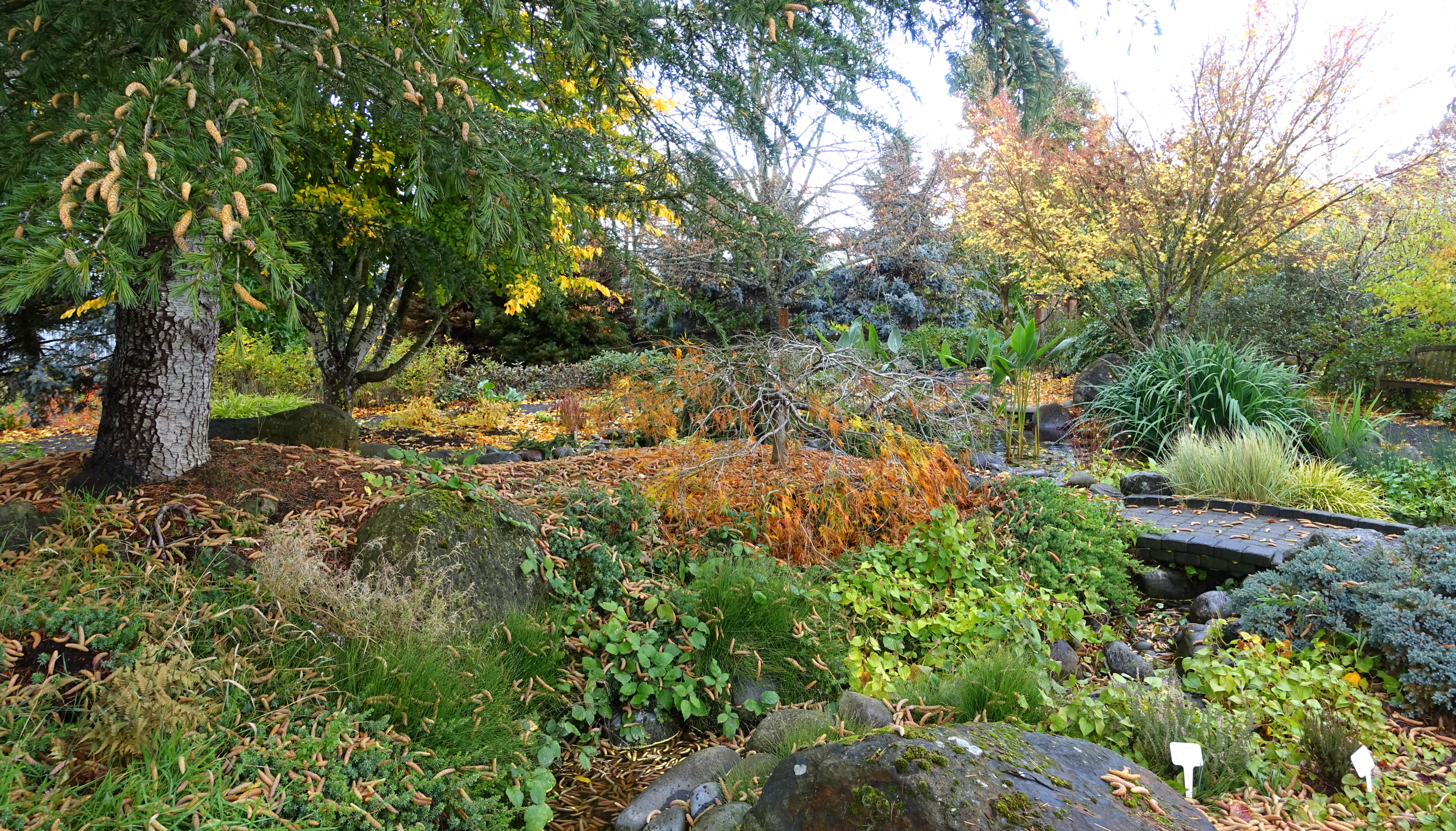
One area of the garden.

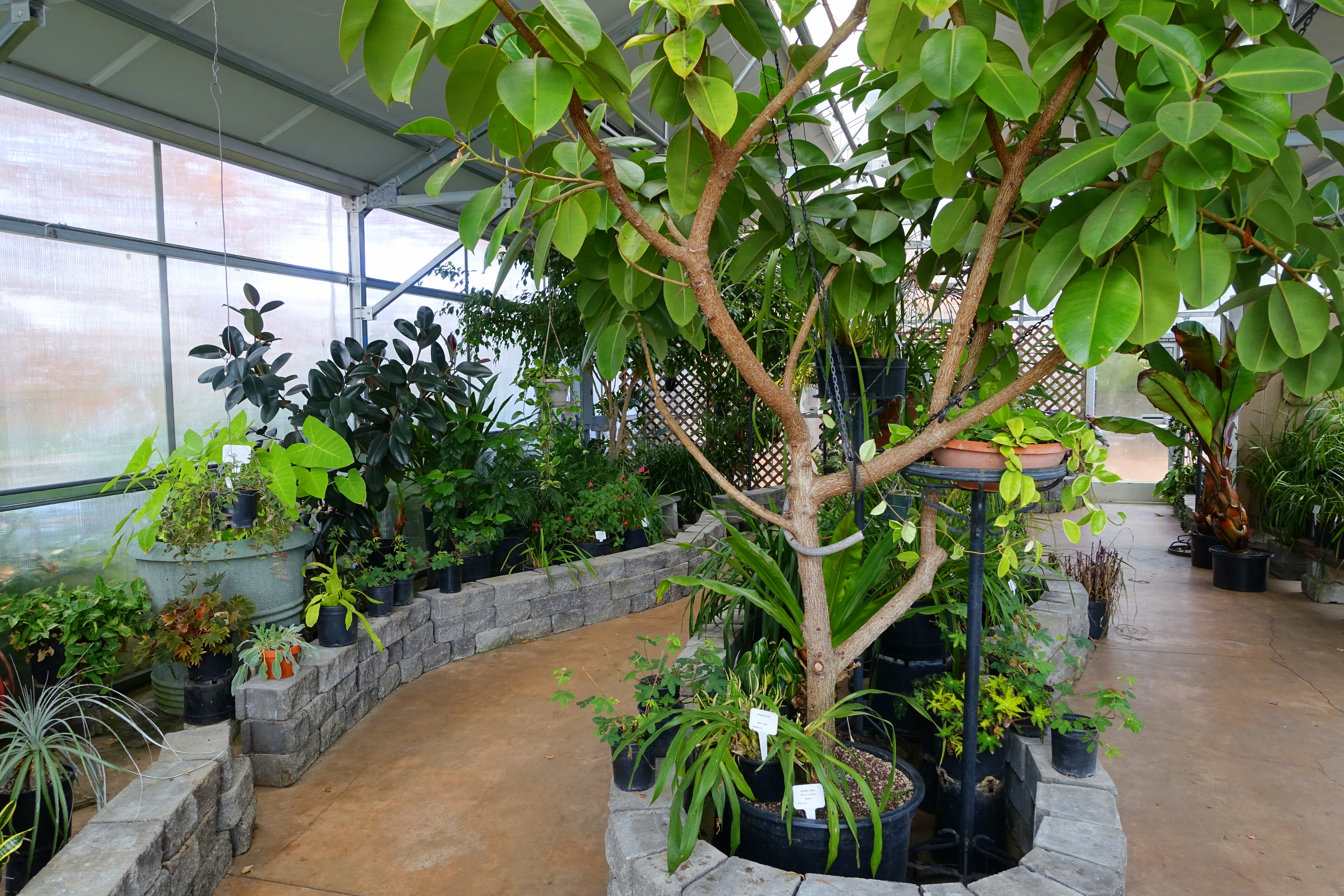
Inside a greenhouse.

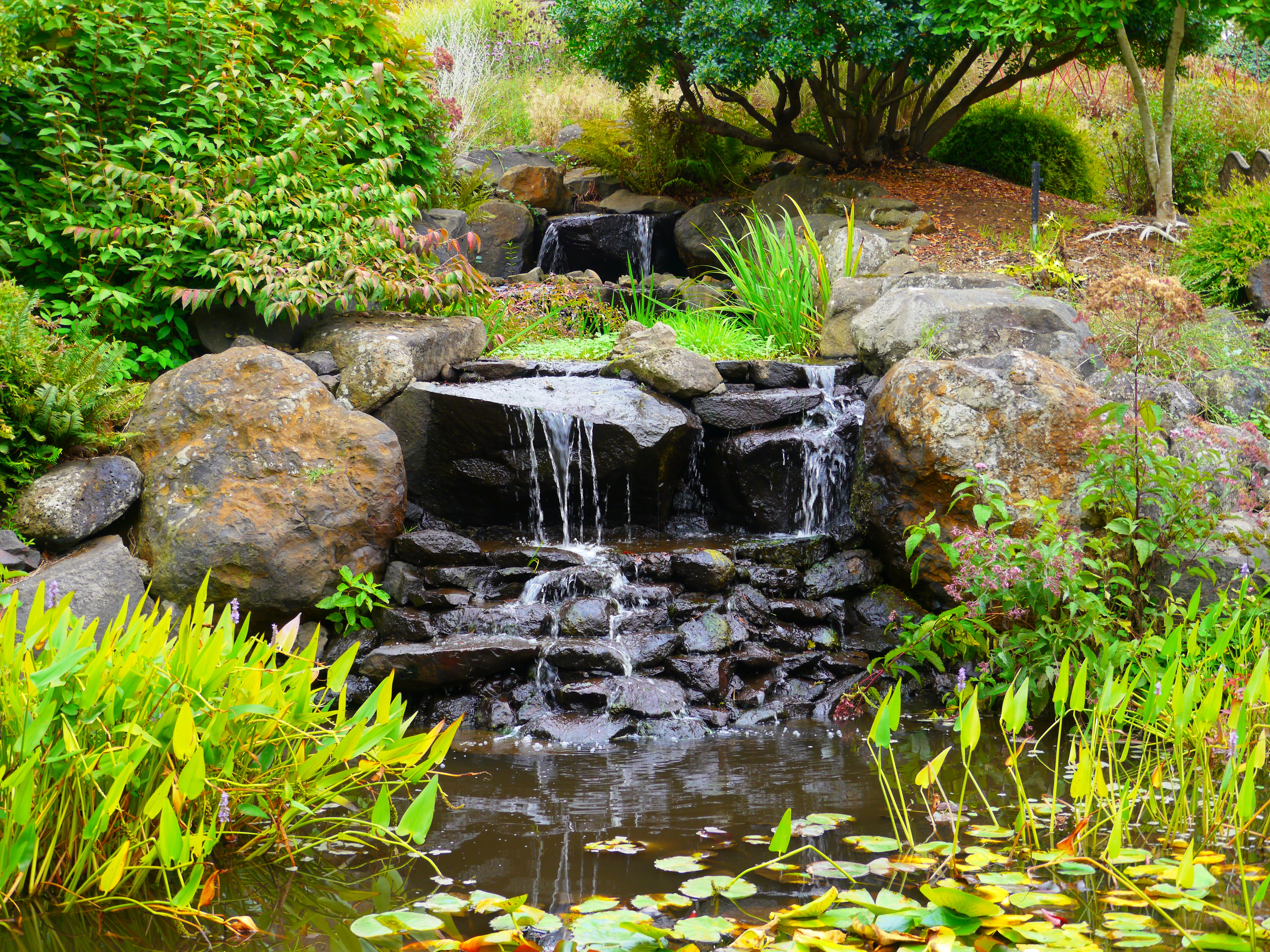
Small waterfall.

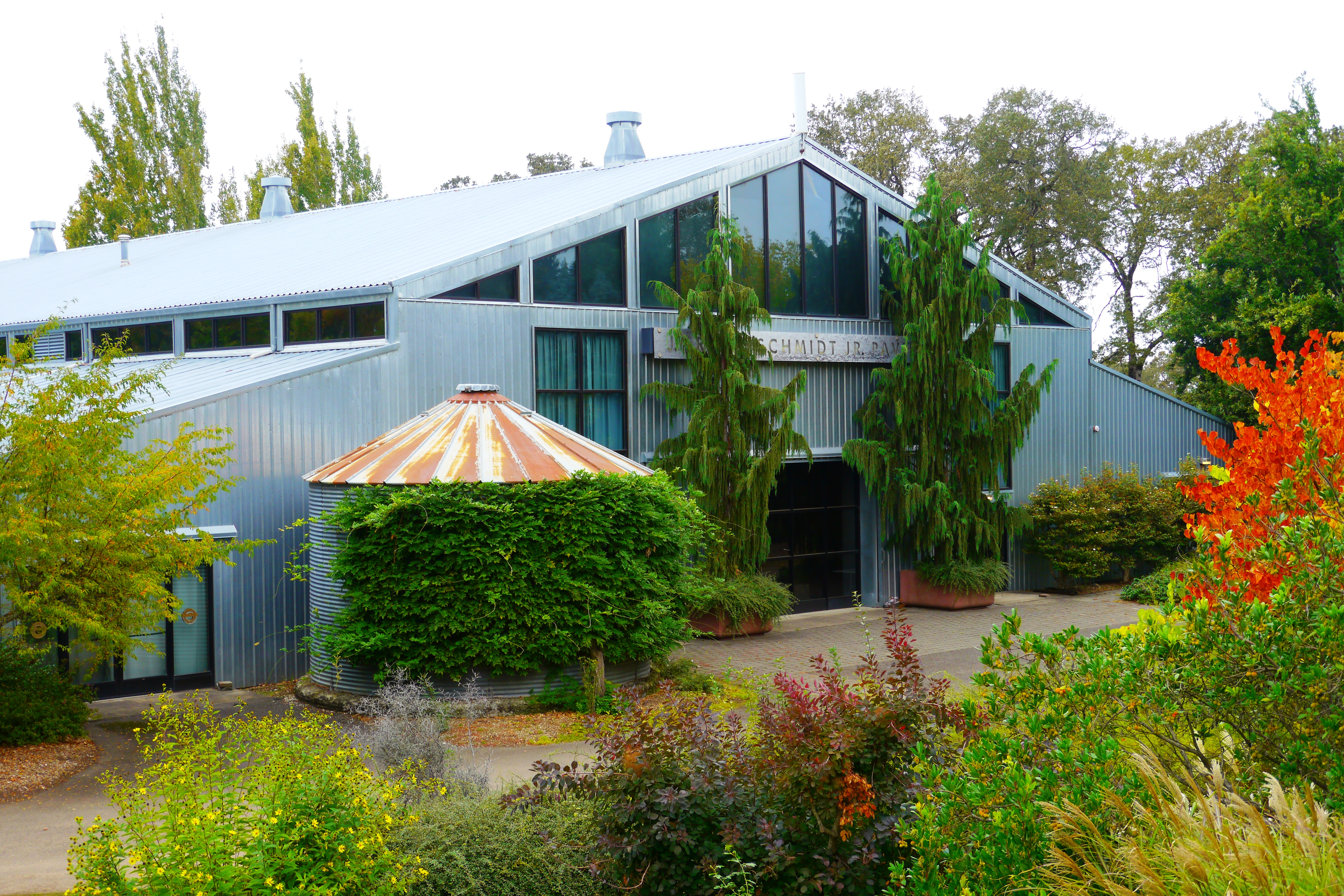
The J. Frank Schmidt, Jr. Pavilion

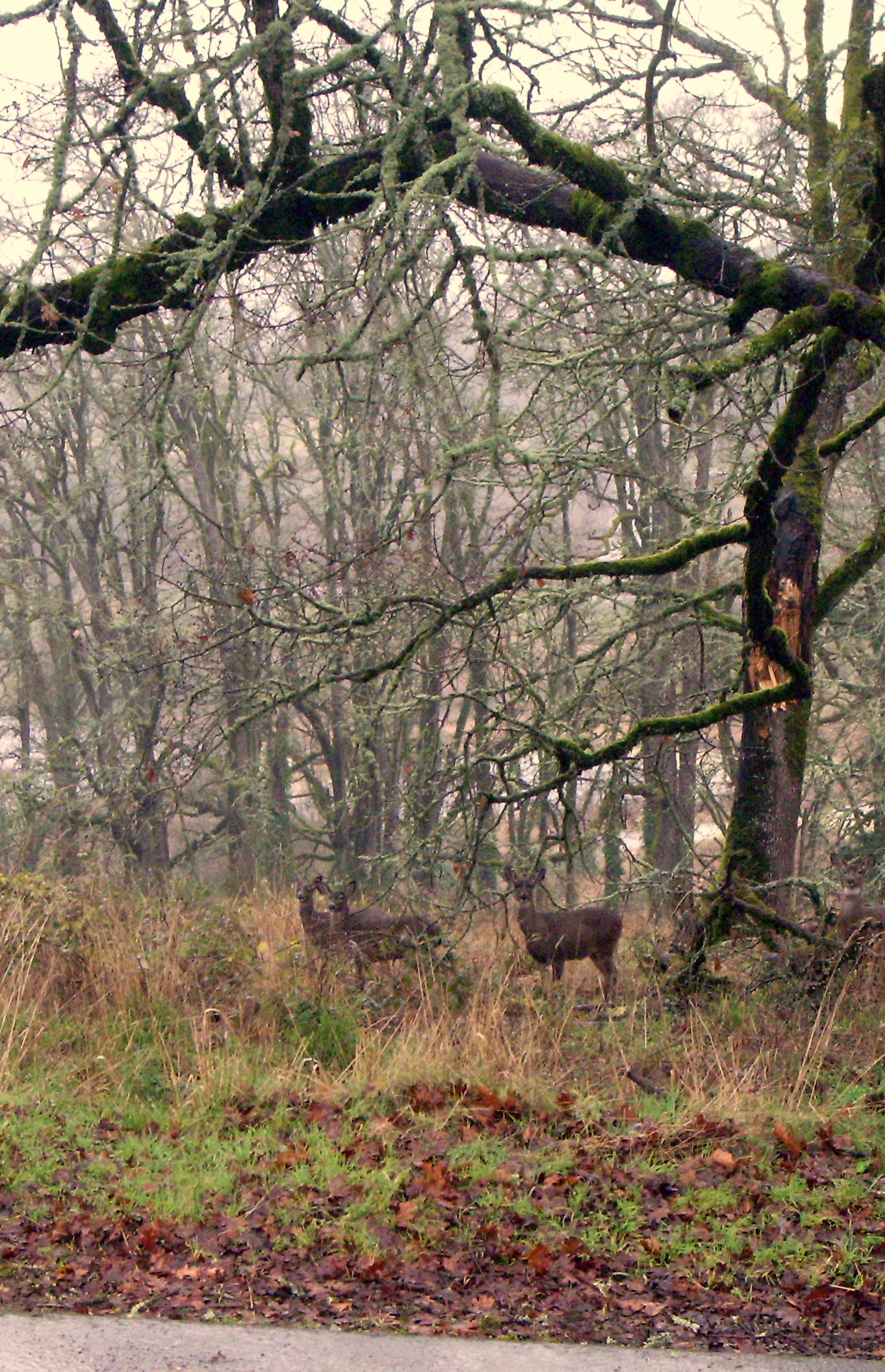
Deer are sometimes spotted onsite.

== See also ==
- List of botanical gardens in the United States
