= Town Square Park =

Park in Silverton, Oregon, U.S.

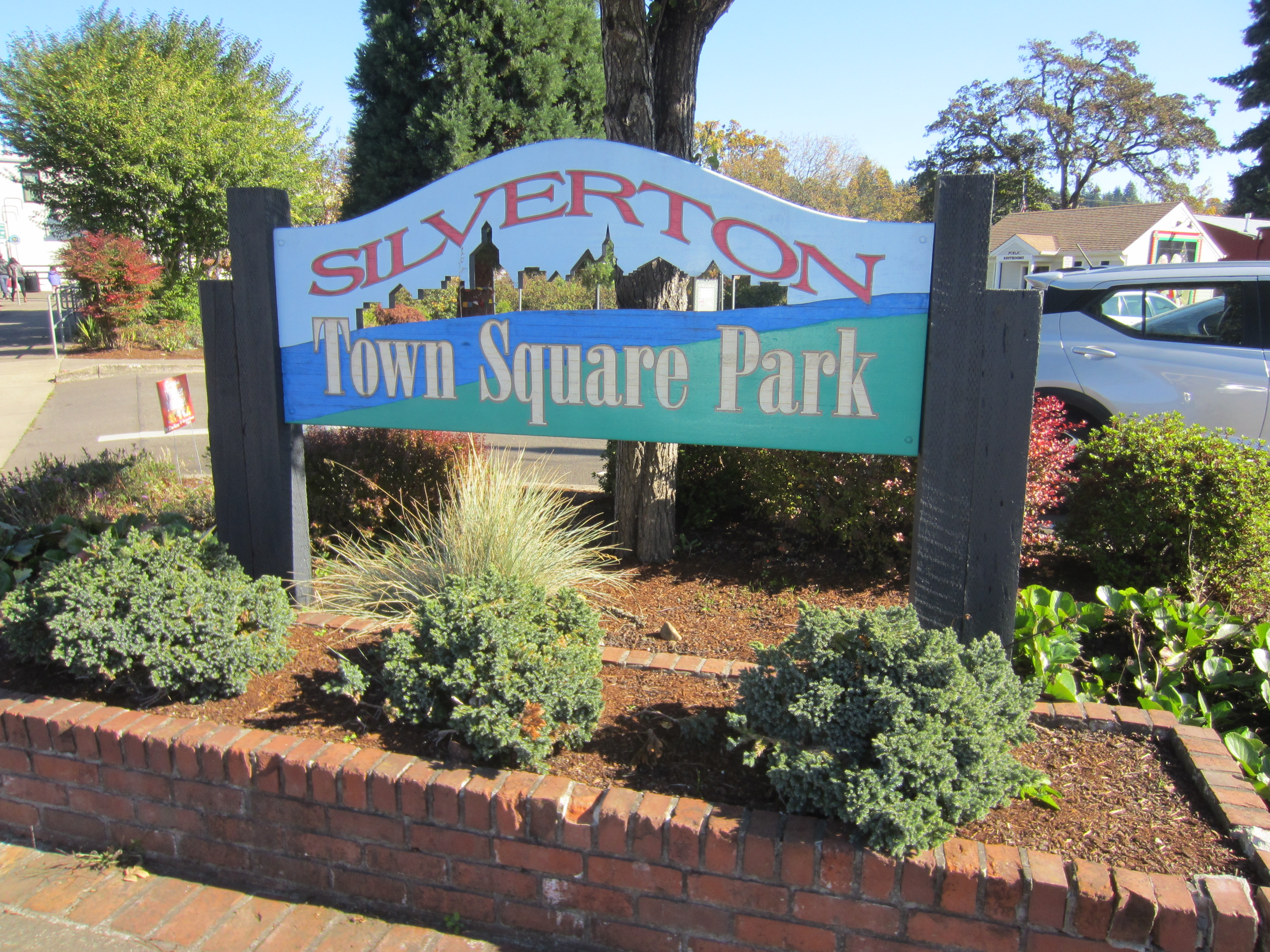
- Park signage, 2020

- Location within Oregon
- Location: Silverton, Oregon, U.S.
- Coordinates: 45°00′17″N 122°47′00″W

Town Square Park is a 0.25-acre (0.10 ha) public park in Silverton, Oregon, United States.

== Features ==
The park features a footbridge crossing Silverton Creek and Freedom Memorial Plaza, which has a Fallen Heroes War Memorial dedicated on Veterans Day in November 2015. The memorial has five black granite panels displaying the names of 68 locals who died in combat from the Spanish–American War to the Iraq War, as of August 2017. The park serves as home to the city's annual holiday tree. Holiday decorating projects have been initiated in the park by the Silverton Chamber of Commerce. The local Kiwanis Club operates a "Letters to Santa" mailbox in the park.

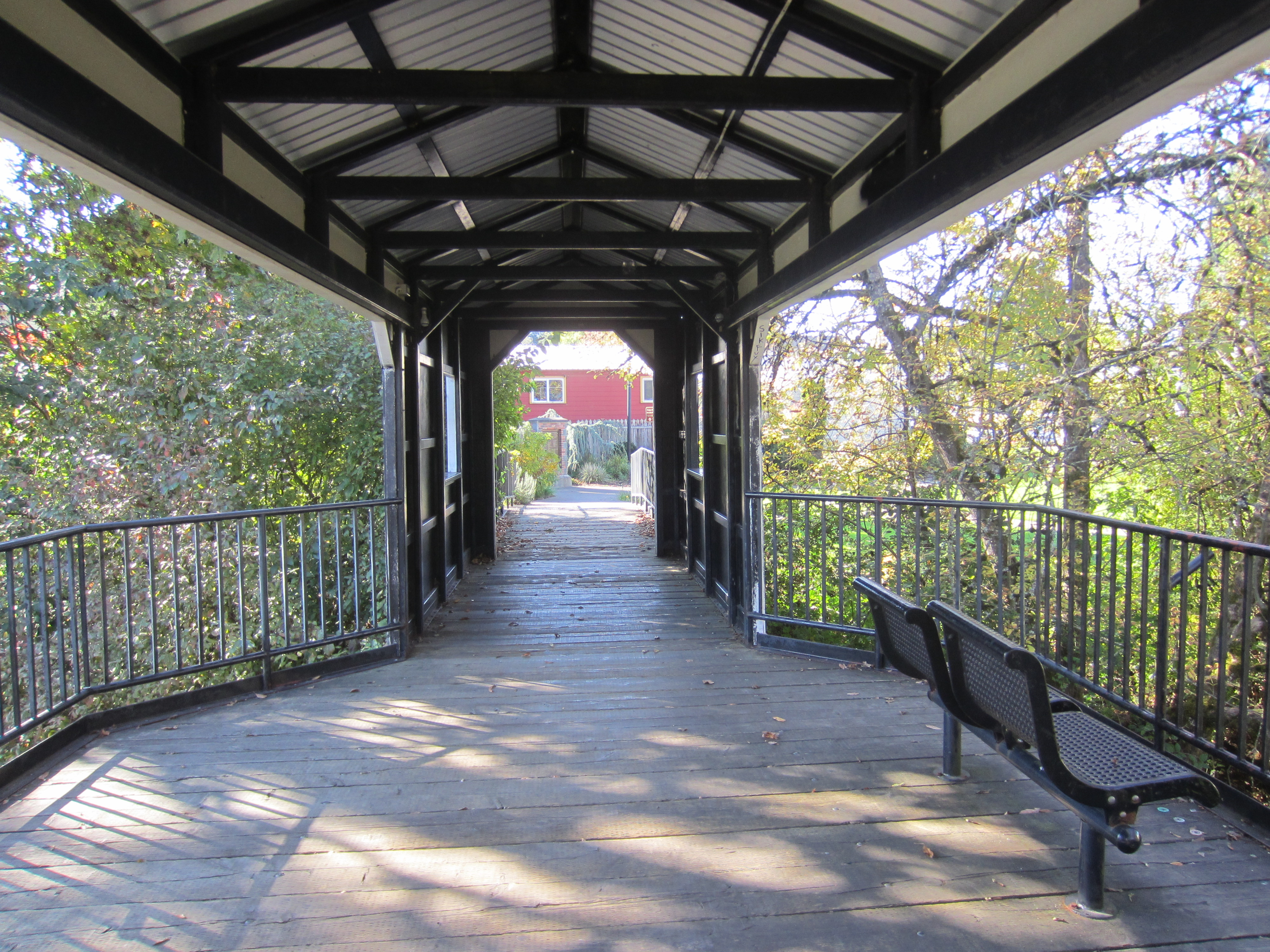
Footbridge

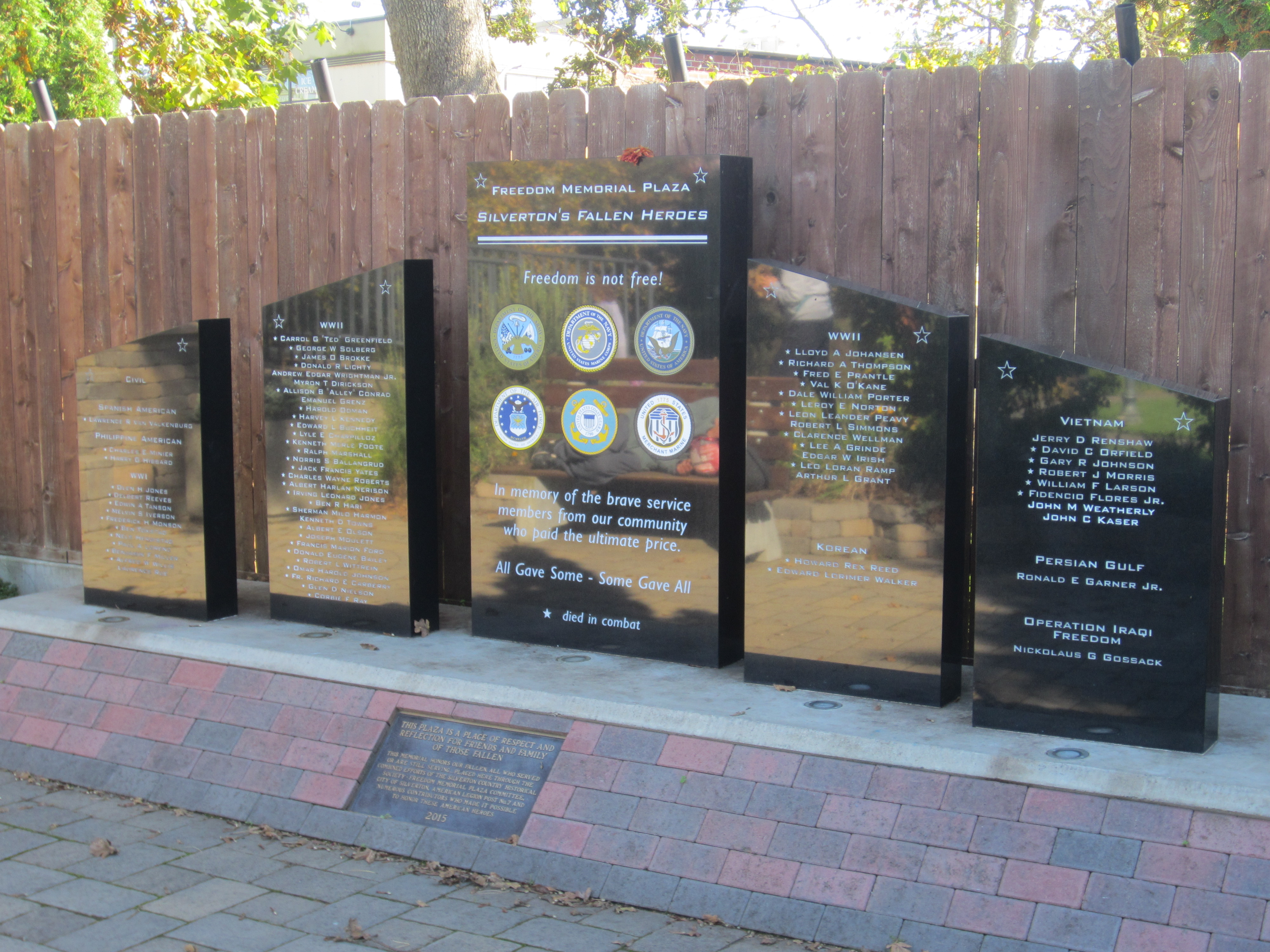
War memorial

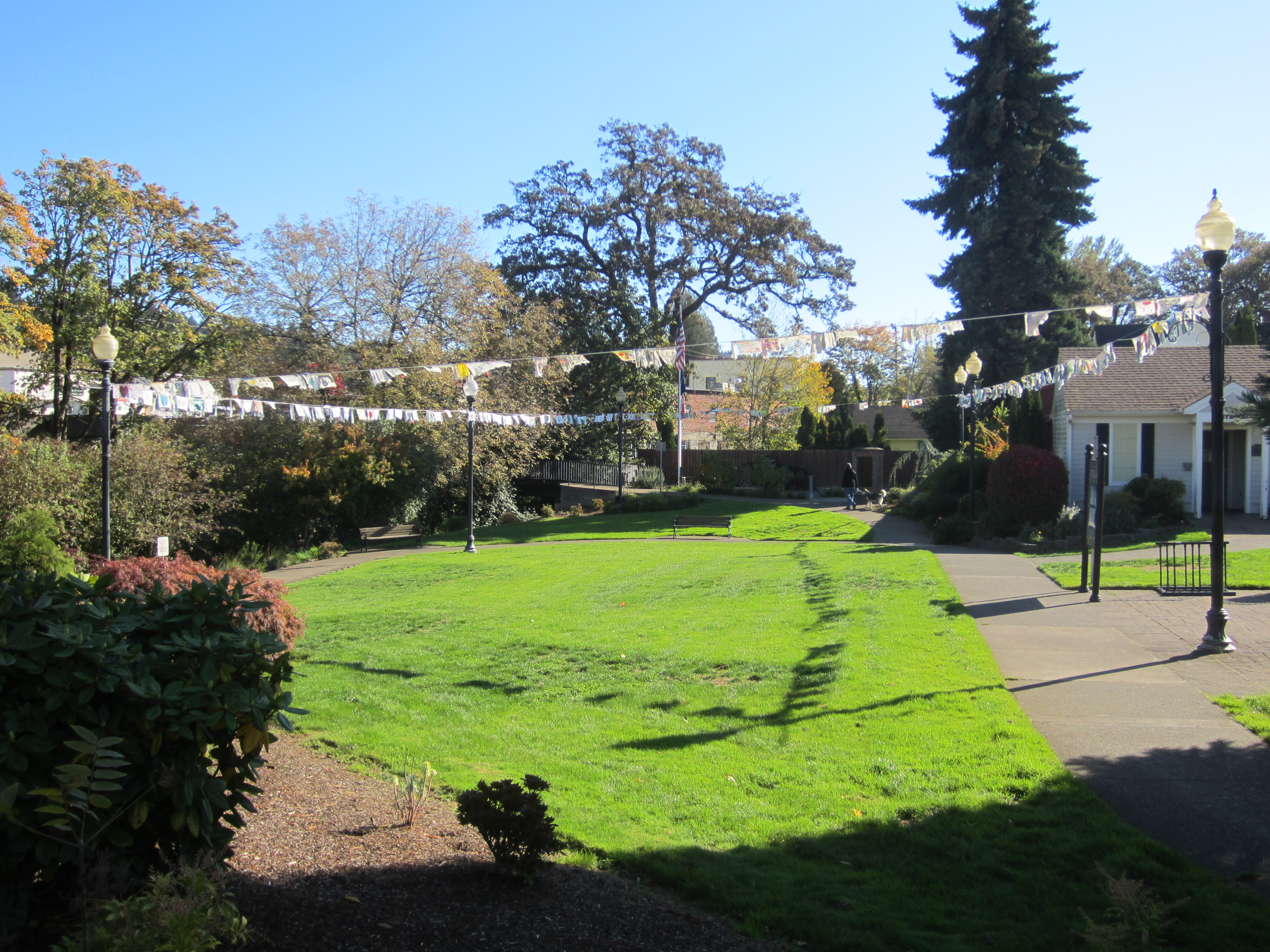
Grassy area

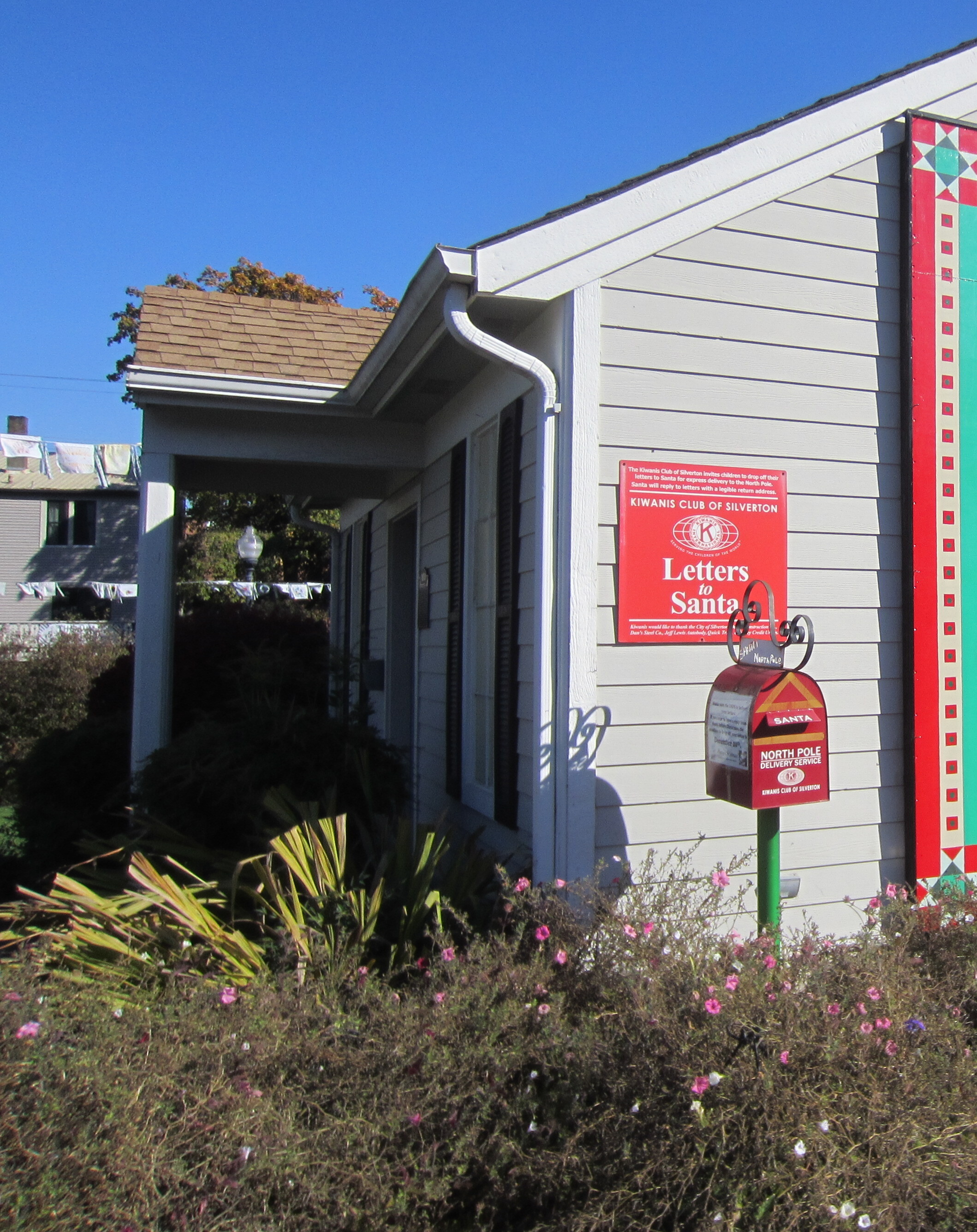
Letters to Santa
