= Palace Theatre (Silverton, Oregon) =

Theatre in Silverton, Oregon, U.S.

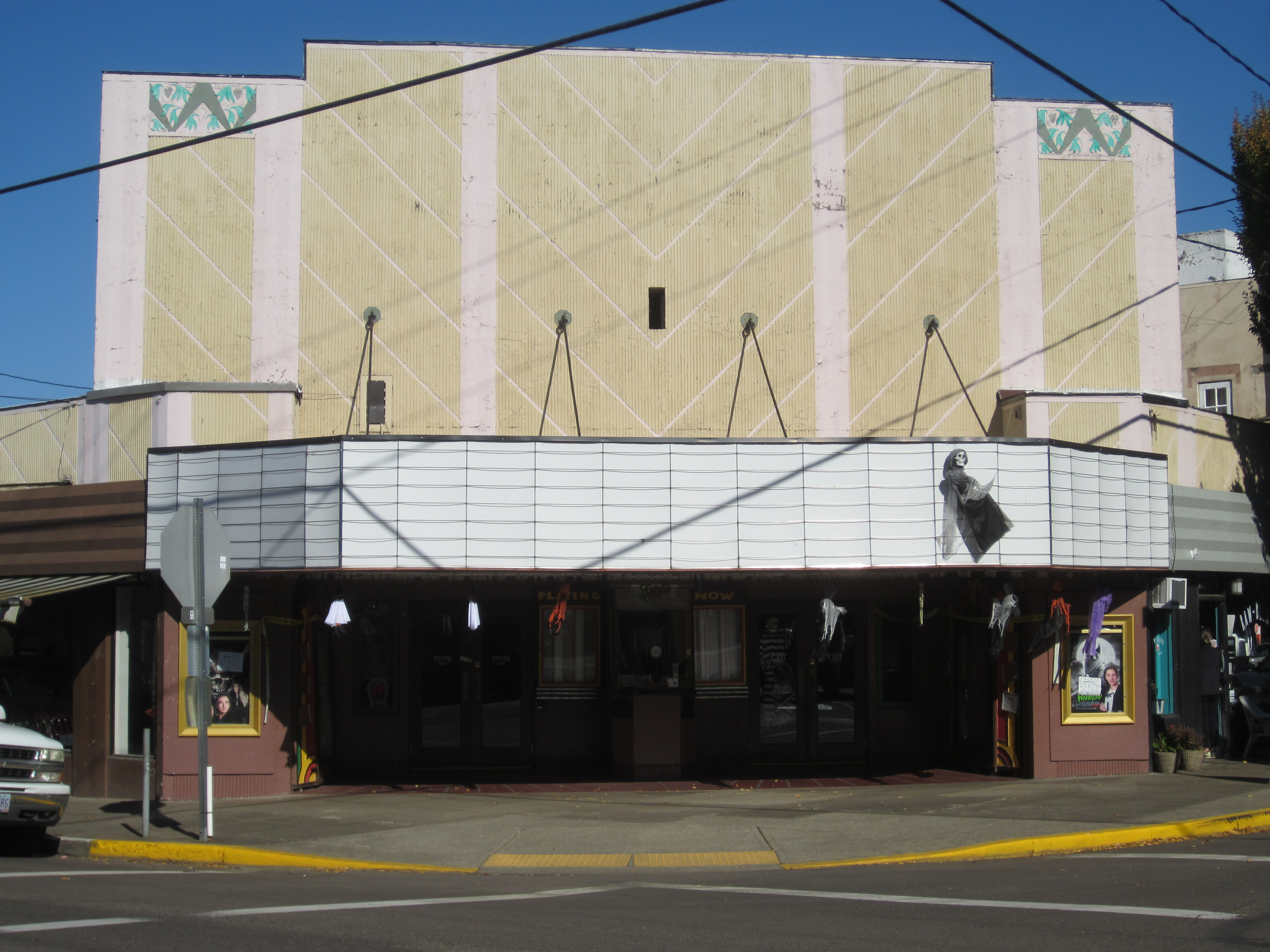
- The venue's front exterior in October 2020, during the COVID-19 pandemic
- Interactive map of Palace Theatre
- Address: 200 North Water Street; Silverton, Oregon; United States
- Coordinates: 40°0′21.7″N 122°47′0.2″W
- Owner: Stu Rasmussen (1974–present)
- Palace Theatre
- U.S. Historic district – Contributing property
- Part of: Silverton Commercial Historic District (ID87000878)
- Designated CP: July 29, 1987

The Palace Theatre is an art deco theatre in Silverton, Oregon, United States. The venue is a contributing property of the NRHP-listed Silverton Commercial Historic District.

== History ==
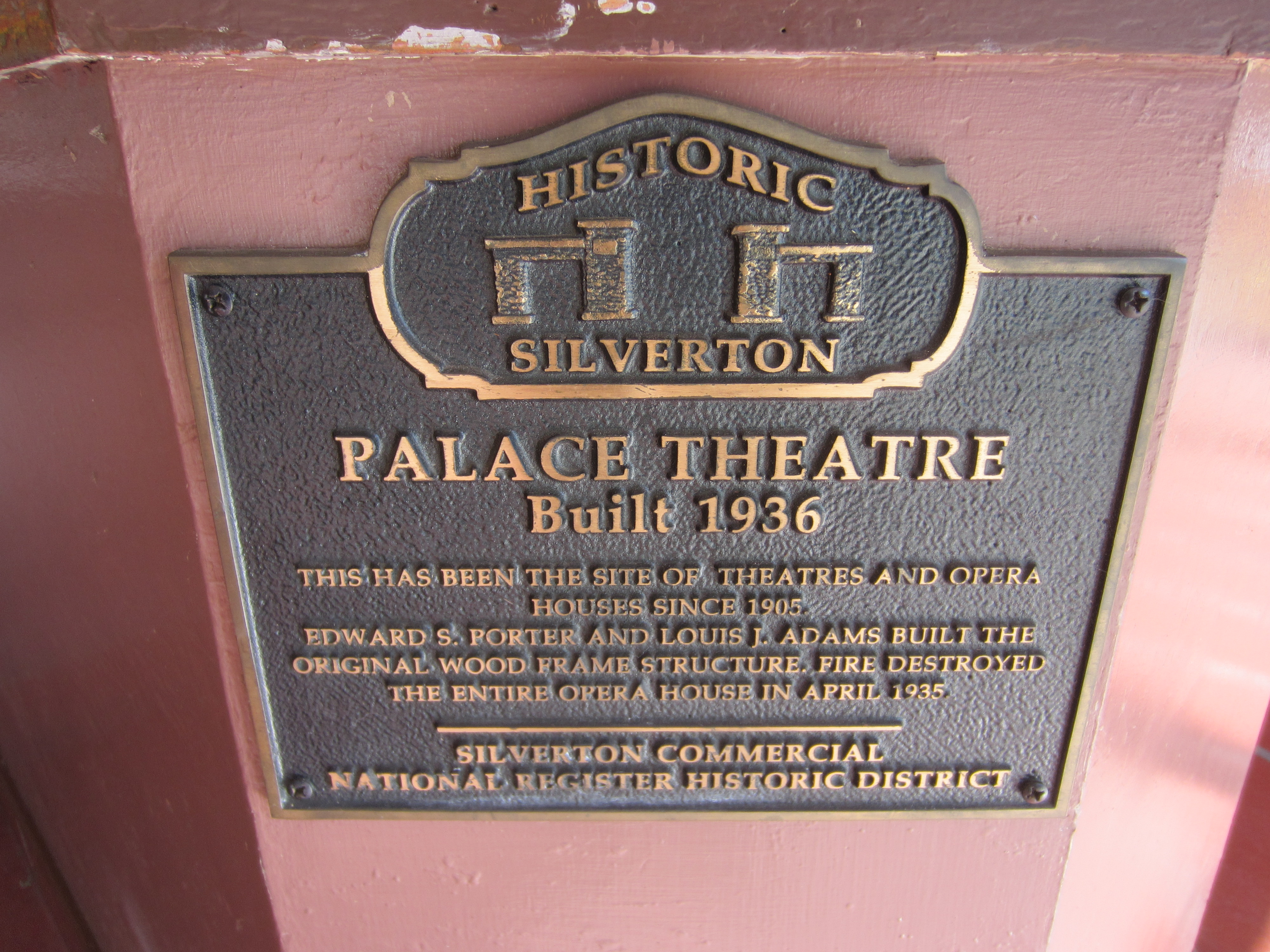
Plaque describing the site's history

The current theatre was built in 1936, replacing the Opera House, which was built during the early 1900s and screened films since 1909 but was destroyed by fire in 1935. Former mayor Stu Rasmussen co-owned the venue beginning 1974.

In 2012, a fire forced the venue to close temporarily and undergo a restoration. The theatre was restored to its original "glory, but with state-of-the-art 21st-century entertainment technology carefully hidden away".

A replica of the theatre's marquee was part of the set of the 2013 musical about Rasmussen called Stu for Silverton.

Owners announced plans to close in 2020 during the COVID-19 pandemic. However, the theater has since re-opened.

== Architecture ==
The theatre faces southwest diagonally on a street corner. It is built of concrete. The facade features a large chevron pattern divided by vertical stripes. A metal-constructed marquee hangs in front of the theatre, supported from the upper facade by wires.

== Reception ==
In 2018, Justin Much of the Statesman Journal included Palace Theatre in his list of "7 essentials to Silverton's unique appeal".
