= Stu Rasmussen =

American politician (1948–2021)

Mayor of Silverton, Oregon
- In office January 2009 – January 2015
- Preceded by: Ken Hector
- Succeeded by: Rick Lewis

Silverton City Councilor
- In office January 2004 – January 2008

Silver Falls Library Board
- In office 1997–2001

Silverton City Councilor
- In office January 1992 – January 1996

Mayor of Silverton, Oregon
- In office January 1988 – January 1992

Silverton City Councilor
- In office January 1984 – January 1988

Personal details
- Born: September 9, 1948 Silverton, Oregon, U.S.
- Died: November 17, 2021 (aged 73) Silverton, Oregon, U.S.
- Party: Democratic (since 1996)
- Other political affiliations: Independent (before 1996)

Stu Rasmussen (September 9, 1948 – November 17, 2021) was an American politician. She (Note: Rasmussen used both "she/her" and "he/him" pronouns.) became the nation's first openly transgender mayor when she was elected as the mayor of Silverton, Oregon in November 2008.

== Early life and career ==
Stu Rasmussen was born on September 9, 1948 in Silverton, Oregon to Nan and Albert Rasmussen. Albert was a Danish immigrant and Stu was the couple's only child. Nan worked as a homemaker, and Albert ran a local movie theater, the Palace, as well as working in gold panning and mail delivery.

In 1971, Rasmussen graduated from Chemeketa Community College with an associate degree in electrical engineering. She then moved to Beaverton, Oregon, working as a video engineer and producer for Tektronix. Later, she moved back to Silverton and started a business setting up cable TV in the city during the 1970s. Rasmussen also contracted for different companies like Garmin, Intel, and Sonic Blue. She created the game Bogus Trivia and a machine called the KissMeter and Relationship Analyzer.

In 1974 Rasmussen became the co-owner of Silverton's Palace Theatre along with Roger Paulson. The theater was built in 1936 and under Rasmussen's management shifted to showing first-run movies. In the 1990s, Rasmussen began dressing as characters from new movies to promote them. Later during Rasmussen's gender transition, her theater lost some business and was targeted for harassment by teenagers. However, she ran the theater with Paulson until 2020, stopping when the COVID-19 pandemic reached the region.

== Political career ==
Rasmussen served on Silverton's City Council in the 1980s. In 1988, she became the city's mayor, serving for two two-year terms. She also served on the Silver Falls Library Board. She described herself as a fiscal conservative and social liberal. She belonged to the American Civil Liberties Union and the National Rifle Association.

Rasmussen unsuccessfully ran for a seat in the Oregon House of Representatives in 1994 as an independent, and a seat in the Oregon State Senate in 1996 as a Democrat. She ran for the House again in 1998 as a Democrat, losing with 41% of the vote.

After publicly coming out as trans, Rasmussen won a 2004 election to a third term on the city council. In 2008, she ran for mayor, narrowly defeating Ken Hector, an eight-term incumbent. Hector and Rasmussen had already had frequent conflicts in local politics. Once, Hector had imposed a dress code on the city council while Rasmussen served there, aiming to force Rasmussen to stop wearing feminine clothes at work. Some locals explained that people in the town had already accepted Rasmussen's identity, having known her for years, and it did not strongly affect the race. However, others later recounted that they were upset by Rasmussen's identity or did not want to elect a transgender mayor. The race largely revolved around local policy issues, including town growth, installing two new traffic lights, and making the town's dam resilient to earthquakes. Rasmussen claimed to have spent about $2,000 on her campaign.

With her 2008 election, Rasmussen became the first known openly trans mayor in the U.S. She was the subject of international news coverage for this accomplishment. The second openly trans mayor in the U.S. came out publicly in 2017 while in office: Jess Herbst, mayor of New Hope, Texas.

Several weeks after Rasmussen's victory, four members of the Westboro Baptist Church in Topeka, Kansas traveled to Silverton to protest Rasmussen's election. Around 200 Silverton residents decided to counterprotest across the street with opposing signs, and many protestors decided to cross-dress. Rasmussen later recounted that she had tried to tell people to ignore the Westboro protest rather than counterprotesting, and was overwhelmed by how supportive the town was on her behalf.

Rasmussen's mayoral politics focused on slowing Silverton's growth and maintaining its historic charm, under the slogan "Keep Silverton Silverton". She sometimes clashed with a more development-oriented city council. In one case, she opposed a proposal to close the city's Main Street to traffic for the creation of a pedestrian shopping area. She remained mayor until 2014, when she lost re-election to Rick Lewis. During her tenure, she built a skate park and senior center for the city, as well as creating an early-warning system for the city's dam.

== Personal life ==
Rasmussen began dating Victoria Sage in 1974 after meeting at Portland's 5th Avenue Cinema. Rasmussen was fixing its projectors and Sage worked as a popcorn vendor. They became partners and married in 2014.

Rasmussen described herself as a "gender anarchist", and used both he/him and she/her pronouns. She sometimes went by the name Carla Fong.

Rasmussen began exploring her gender identity as a teenager. In 1975, she saw The Rocky Horror Picture Show, and was strongly influenced by its portrayal of a man in drag. She later recounted that the film the first time she had heard words like "transvestite" and "transsexual". During the 1990s, she began publicly transitioning and gradually experimented with her gender expression. She began doing her nails and would dress up as characters, often women, to advertise movie premieres. She later began wearing bras under masculine clothing on errands to test if she "could survive with breasts", and she had breast augmentation surgery at 52 years old. She originally thought this would end her political career, but she continued serving on the library board during her transition. She later advised Claire Hall on her own transition while in public office, saying that it would be tough and require a lot of internal work, but externally, most people would not care beyond some resistant constituents. In a 2015 interview, Rasmussen reflected on her experience in Silverton:

A lot of people who are transgender think, 'I can't be myself here. I have to go somewhere else, go to Portland or to San Francisco, and let the other side of me come out' [...] I transitioned in place. And the community came along with me.

Rasmussen died from prostate cancer on November 17, 2021, at the age of 73. For several weeks before, she had remained at home under hospice care.

== Legacy and recognition ==
Rasmussen often spoke about her experiences with LGBTQ publications and universities.

In 2013 a musical about Rasmussen, Stu for Silverton, premiered at Seattle's Intiman Theatre.

== See also ==
- List of transgender public officeholders in the United States
