= Silverton High School (Oregon) =

Location
- 1456 Pine Street; Silverton, (Marion County), Oregon 97381; United States; 45.0143831°N 122.7982544°W

Information
- Type: Public
- School district: Silver Falls School District
- Principal: Sione Thompson
- Teaching staff: 63.60 (FTE)
- Grades: 9-12
- Enrollment: 1,243 (2021-2022)
- Student to teacher ratio: 19.54
- Colors: Orange, Black, and Silver
- Athletics conference: OSAA 5A-3 Mid-Willamette Conference
- Mascot: Fox
- Team name: Foxes
- Website: Silverton High School website

Silverton High School is a public high school located in the rural town of Silverton, Oregon, United States. It is a part of the Silver Falls School District and is the only high school in the district.

== History ==
Silverton High School started as a 6-room high school named "Washington Irving (High School)" It was built in 1890 and opened in 1907. The old building burned down in 1924 and a new Silverton High School was built in 1939 on Schlador Street. However, the building was deemed seismically unsafe, and a new and current Silverton High School was built on Pine Street; the school was later moved to a new building nearby.

== Academics ==
In 2008, 83% of the school's seniors received a high school diploma. Of 291 students, 241 graduated, 37 dropped out, four received a modified diploma, and nine were still in high school the following year.

In 2022, 89% of the school's seniors received a high school diploma. Of 317 students, 285 graduated, and 32 dropped out.

== Athletics ==
Silverton High School Athletic teams compete in the OSAA 5A-3 Mid-Willamette Conference. The athletics director is Andrew Jones, and the athletics secretary is Valerie Martinson.

State championships:

- Boys Basketball: 2015
- Boys Track and Field: 2022
- Choir: 2019
- Dance/Drill: 1998, 1999, 2000, 2014, 2023
- Football: 1991, 2021, 2025
- Girls Basketball: 1989, 1994, 2016, 2024
- Girls Golf: 1993
- Speech: 2008, 2009
- Wrestling: 1972

== Notable alumni ==
- Scott Gragg, 1990, football player
- Howard Hesseman, actor
- Don Pettit, 1973, astronaut
- Henk Schenk, 1963, former wrestler
