= Silverton, Oregon =

- City
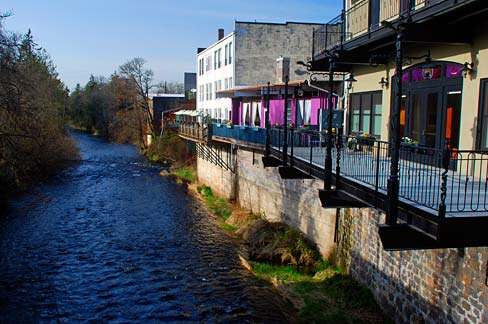
- Cafes, coffee shops, and restaurants overlook Silver Creek from North Water Street in downtown Silverton.

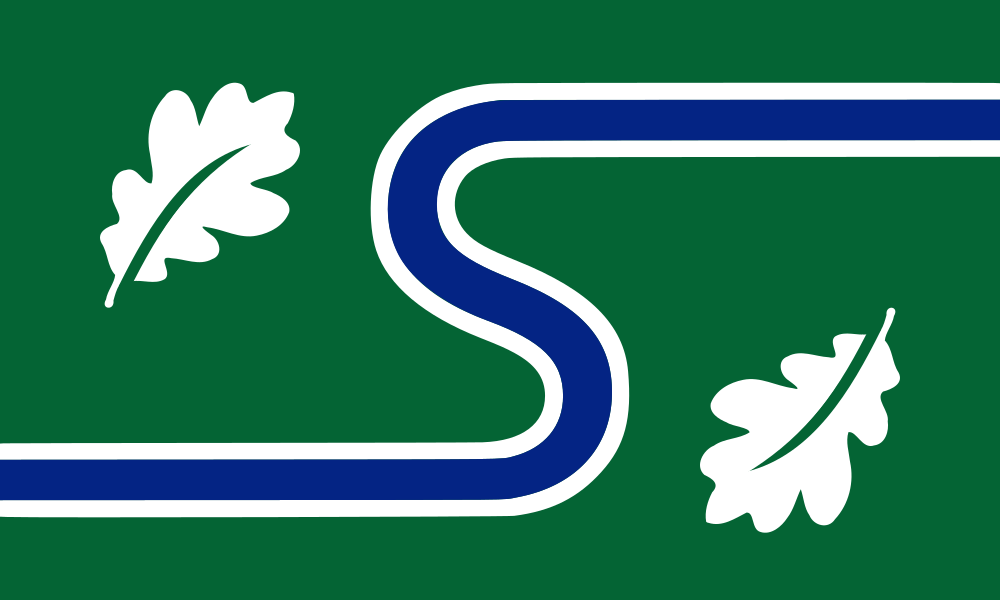
- Flag
- Nickname: Gateway to Silver Falls
- Motto: Oregon's Garden City
- Location in Oregon
- Coordinates: 45°00′10″N 122°46′50″W
- Country: United States
- State: Oregon
- County: Marion
- Incorporated: 1854

Government
  - Mayor: Jason Freilinger

Area
  - Total: 3.54 sq mi (9.18 km^{2})
  - Land: 3.51 sq mi (9.08 km^{2})
  - Water: 0.039 sq mi (0.10 km^{2})
- Elevation: 266 ft (81 m)

Population (2020)
  - Total: 10,484
  - Density: 2,989.5/sq mi (1,154.25/km^{2})
- Time zone: UTC-8 (Pacific)
  - Summer (DST): UTC-7 (Pacific)
- ZIP Code: 97381
- Area code: 503
- FIPS code: 41-67650
- GNIS feature ID: 2411902
- Website: www.silverton.or.us

Silverton is a city in Marion County, Oregon, United States. The city is situated along the 45th parallel about 14 miles (23 km) northeast of Salem, in the eastern margins of the broad alluvial plain of the Willamette Valley. The city is named after Silver Creek, which flows through the town from Silver Falls into the Pudding River, and thence into the Willamette River. The community of Milford was founded in 1846 with a sawmill, store and several other buildings two miles upstream from the present location of Silverton. In about 1853 a second sawmill was built on Silver Creek near where the Silverton city hall now stands. In 1854 the town of Silverton was platted and registered with Marion County. Human habitation of the Silverton area extends back approximately 6,000 years before the present. In historical times, the region was dominated by the Kalapuya and Molala peoples, whose seasonal burns of the area made it plow-ready and attractive to early 19th century Euro-American settlers. Farming was Silverton's first major industry, and has been a dominant land-use activity in and around Silverton since the mid-19th century.

Silverton is part of the Salem Metropolitan Statistical Area, and the population core of the Silver Falls School District. The population was 10,484 at the time of the 2020 census, up from 9,222 in 2010.

== Geography ==
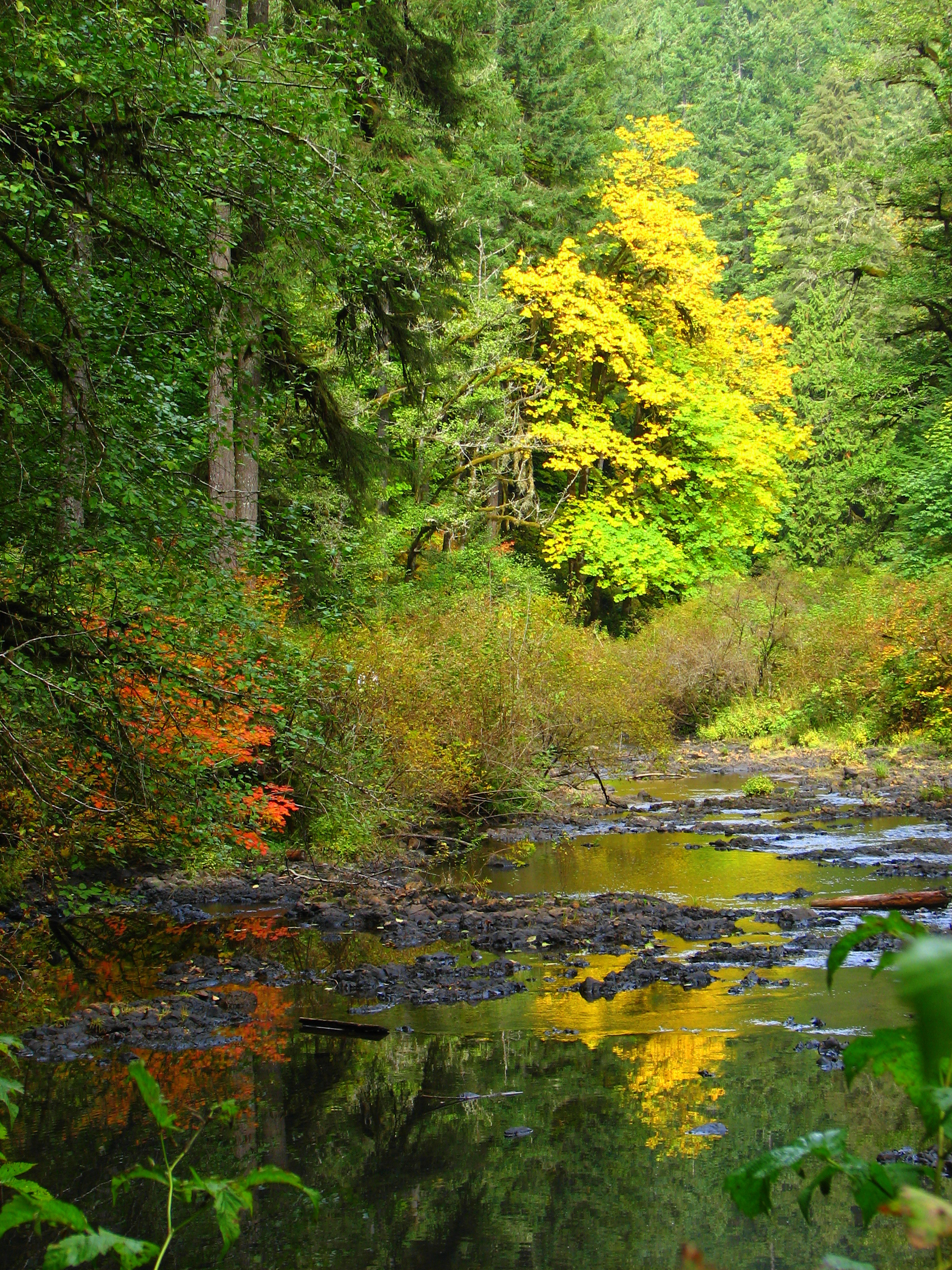
Silver Creek in autumn

Silverton is situated on the eastern edge of the Willamette Valley, a fertile alluvial plain which stretches from the western foothills of the Cascade Range on the east, known as the Waldo Hills, to the eastern foothills of the Oregon Coast Range on the west. Silverton lies on either side of Silver Creek, a tributary of the Pudding River, which joins the Molalla River before emptying into the northward-flowing Willamette River. Abiqua Creek also empties into the Pudding River; it flows across the eastern valley north of Silverton, further draining the land around the city.

Silverton's elevation is between 200 and 250 feet (61 and 76 m) above mean sea level with the steep-sided, heavily-wooded Waldo Hills to the south rising an additional 200 feet (61 m). The agricultural richness of the environs is due to massive and repeated floods from prehistoric Lake Missoula in western Montana. Beginning approximately 13,000 years before the present, repeated flooding from Lake Missoula scoured eastern Washington and Oregon, carved out the Columbia River Gorge, and periodically swept down the Columbia River; when floodwaters met ice jams in southwest Washington, the backed-up water spilled over and filled the entire Willamette Valley to a depth of 300 to 400 feet (91 to 122 m) above current sea level, creating a body of water known as Lake Allison. The gradual receding of Lake Allison's waters left layered sedimentary volcanic and glacial soils to a height of about 180 to 200 feet (55 to 61 m) above current sea level throughout the Tualatin, Yamhill and Willamette Valleys.

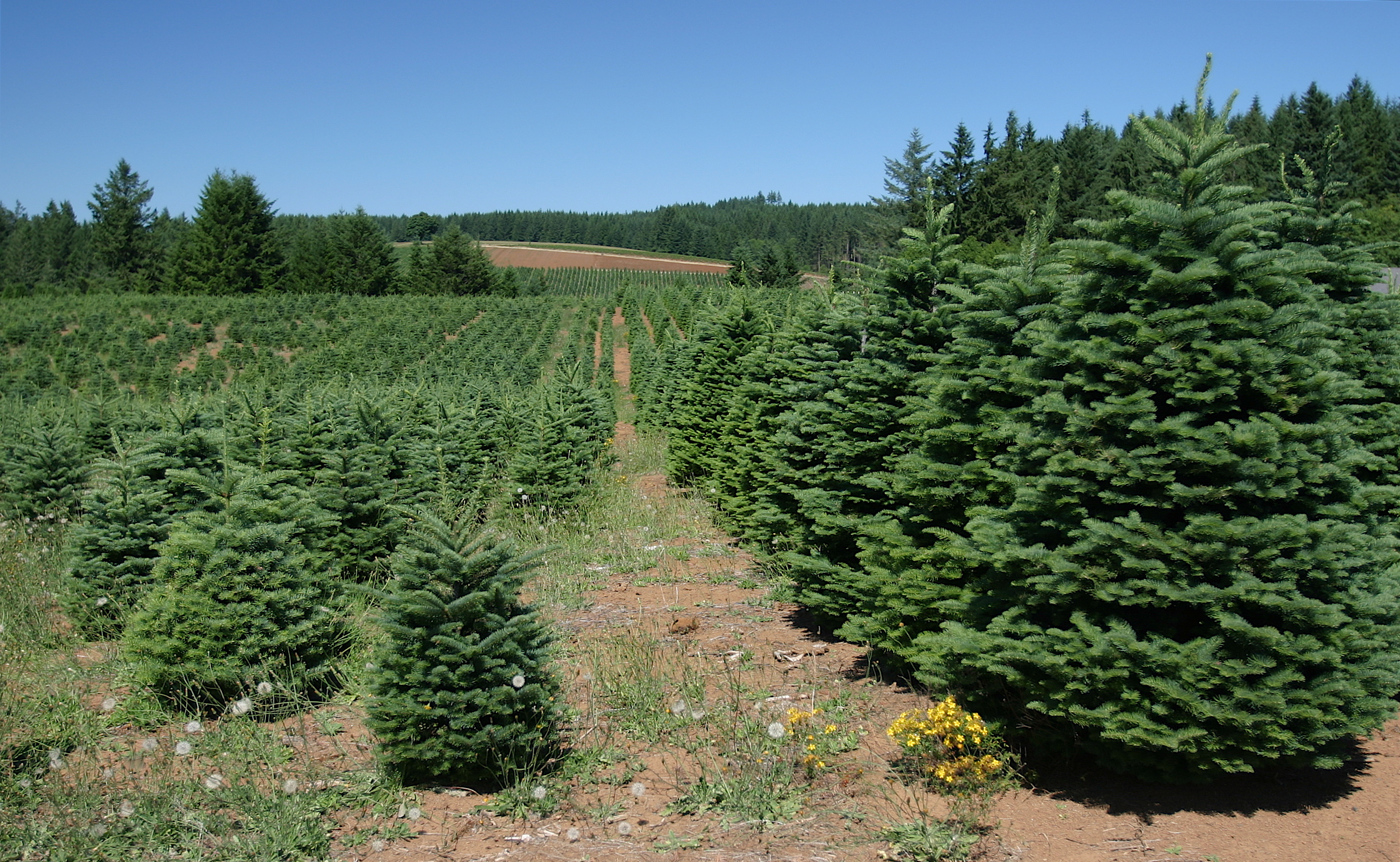
A Christmas tree farm near Silverton

Until the mid-19th century, the Silverton area was a broad, open grassland with small stands of Oregon white oak, ponderosa pine and Douglas fir. Stands of Oregon white oak, red alder, big leaf maple, and black cottonwood lined streams and river banks. While these tree species are extant today, widespread farming in the Willamette Valley between 1850 and 1870 altered the land through the discontinuation of widespread seasonal burning in the valley plains previously employed by the Kalapuya people. Large stands of Douglas fir and western red cedar, mixed with Oregon white oak, remain in the Silverton area, especially on eastern ridge tops and on the slopes of the Waldo Hills to the south. Due to decades of intensive timber extraction, mature second- and third-growth trees comprise existing evergreen stands.

According to the United States Census Bureau, the city has a total area of 3.54 square miles (9.17 km^{2}), of which 3.51 square miles (9.09 km^{2}) are land and 0.04 square miles (0.10 km^{2}), or 1.04%, are water.

=== Climate ===
This region experiences warm (with occasional hot spells) and dry summers, but with no average monthly temperatures above 71.6 °F (22.0 °C). According to the Köppen Climate Classification system, Silverton has a warm-summer Mediterranean climate, abbreviated "Csb" on climate maps. The climate is relatively mild, considering Silverton's northern latitude, and temperature fluctuations are generally small. Precipitation, primarily in the form of fall and winter rain, ranges between 40 and 50 inches (1,000 and 1,300 mm) annually. Silverton's climate and its soil have made the area well suited for a variety of crops and for livestock grazing.

Climate data for Silverton
Month	Jan	Feb	Mar	Apr	May	Jun	Jul	Aug	Sep	Oct	Nov	Dec	Year
Record high °F (°C)	66 (19)	71 (22)	74 (23)	86 (30)	102 (39)	100 (38)	103 (39)	104 (40)	103 (39)	91 (33)	72 (22)	66 (19)	104 (40)
Mean daily maximum °F (°C)	46.0 (7.8)	50.6 (10.3)	54.7 (12.6)	59.0 (15.0)	65.8 (18.8)	71.5 (21.9)	78.7 (25.9)	79.2 (26.2)	74.1 (23.4)	62.9 (17.2)	52.0 (11.1)	45.6 (7.6)	61.7 (16.5)
Mean daily minimum °F (°C)	33.8 (1.0)	35.4 (1.9)	38.0 (3.3)	40.6 (4.8)	45.5 (7.5)	50.6 (10.3)	54.2 (12.3)	54.5 (12.5)	50.6 (10.3)	44.0 (6.7)	38.6 (3.7)	33.9 (1.1)	43.3 (6.3)
Record low °F (°C)	4 (−16)	6 (−14)	19 (−7)	28 (−2)	32 (0)	37 (3)	42 (6)	40 (4)	34 (1)	23 (−5)	13 (−11)	0 (−18)	0 (−18)
Average precipitation inches (mm)	6.83 (173)	4.85 (123)	5.11 (130)	3.69 (94)	2.83 (72)	1.94 (49)	0.69 (18)	0.87 (22)	1.77 (45)	3.63 (92)	7.08 (180)	7.52 (191)	46.82 (1,189)
Average precipitation days	20	17	19	17	13	9	4	4	7	13	21	21	165

== Demographics ==
Historical population
Census	Pop.	Note	%±
1880	229		—
1890	511		123.1%
1900	656		28.4%
1910	1,588		142.1%
1920	2,251		41.8%
1930	2,462		9.4%
1940	2,925		18.8%
1950	3,146		7.6%
1960	3,081		−2.1%
1970	4,301		39.6%
1980	5,168		20.2%
1990	5,635		9.0%
2000	7,433		31.9%
2010	9,222		24.1%
2020	10,484		13.7%
U.S. Decennial Census

=== 2020 census ===
As of the 2020 census, Silverton had a population of 10,484. The median age was 39.2 years. 25.4% of residents were under the age of 18 and 19.3% of residents were 65 years of age or older. For every 100 females there were 92.7 males, and for every 100 females age 18 and over there were 89.2 males age 18 and over.

98.3% of residents lived in urban areas, while 1.7% lived in rural areas.

There were 3,983 households in Silverton, of which 34.2% had children under the age of 18 living in them. Of all households, 52.7% were married-couple households, 13.4% were households with a male householder and no spouse or partner present, and 27.2% were households with a female householder and no spouse or partner present. About 24.1% of all households were made up of individuals and 13.4% had someone living alone who was 65 years of age or older.

There were 4,173 housing units, of which 4.6% were vacant. Among occupied housing units, 67.2% were owner-occupied and 32.8% were renter-occupied. The homeowner vacancy rate was 1.8% and the rental vacancy rate was 4.6%.

Racial composition as of the 2020 census
Race	Number	Percent
White	8,532	81.4%
Black or African American	63	0.6%
American Indian and Alaska Native	106	1.0%
Asian	70	0.7%
Native Hawaiian and Other Pacific Islander	14	0.1%
Some other race	604	5.8%
Two or more races	1,095	10.4%
Hispanic or Latino (of any race)	1,425	13.6%

=== 2010 census ===
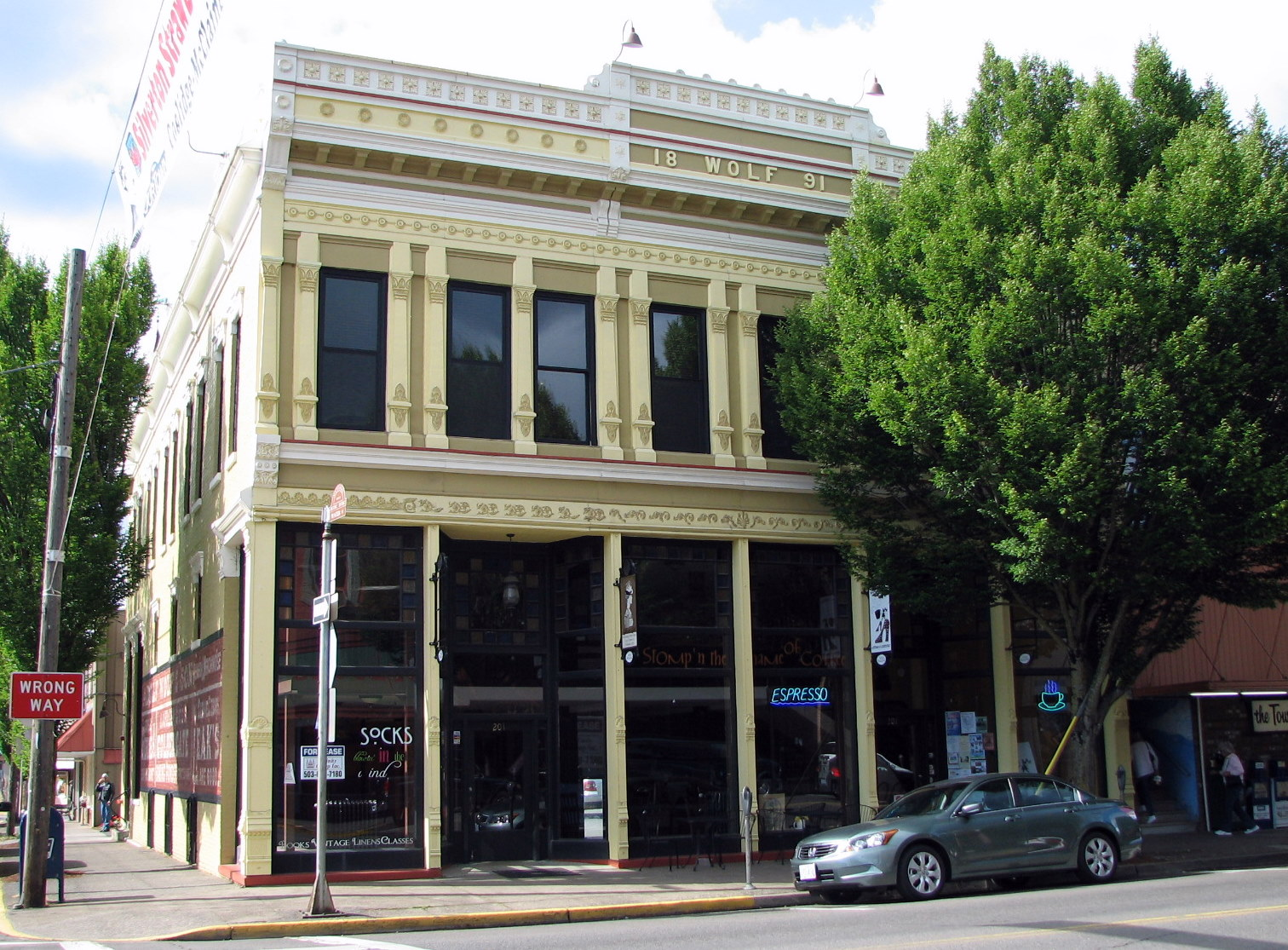
The historic Wolf Building (built 1891), located at the corner of Water and Main Streets, lies within the Silverton Commercial Historic District.

As of the census of 2010, there were 9,222 people, 3,452 households, and 2,442 families residing in Silverton. The population density was 2,691.8 inhabitants per square mile (1,039.3/km^{2}). There were 3,477 housing units, 18.1% of which were housing units in multi-unit structures. The homeownership rate was 64.3% and the median value of owner-occupied housing units was $229,700. The racial makeup of the city was 84.1% White, 12.7% Hispanic or Latino of any race, 1.7% from other races, 1.0% Asian, 0.7% Native American, 0.2% African American, and 0.1% Pacific Islander.

Of the 3,452 households in Silverton, 34.6% had children under the age of 18 living with them. 54% were married couples living together, 12.6% had a female householder with no husband present, 4.1% had a male householder with no wife present, and 29.3% were non-families. 24.3% of all households were made up of individuals, and 25.2% had someone living alone who was 65 years of age or older. The average household size was 2.65 and the average family size was 3.15.

The median age in Silverton was 35.8 years. 28.4% of residents were under the age of 18; 17.2% were 62 years of age or older. Silverton's gender makeup was 47.6% male and 52.4% female. 91.7% were high school graduates, and 29.1% held bachelor's or higher degrees. The median household income was $51,687. 16.1% of the population lived at or below the poverty level.

=== 2000 census ===
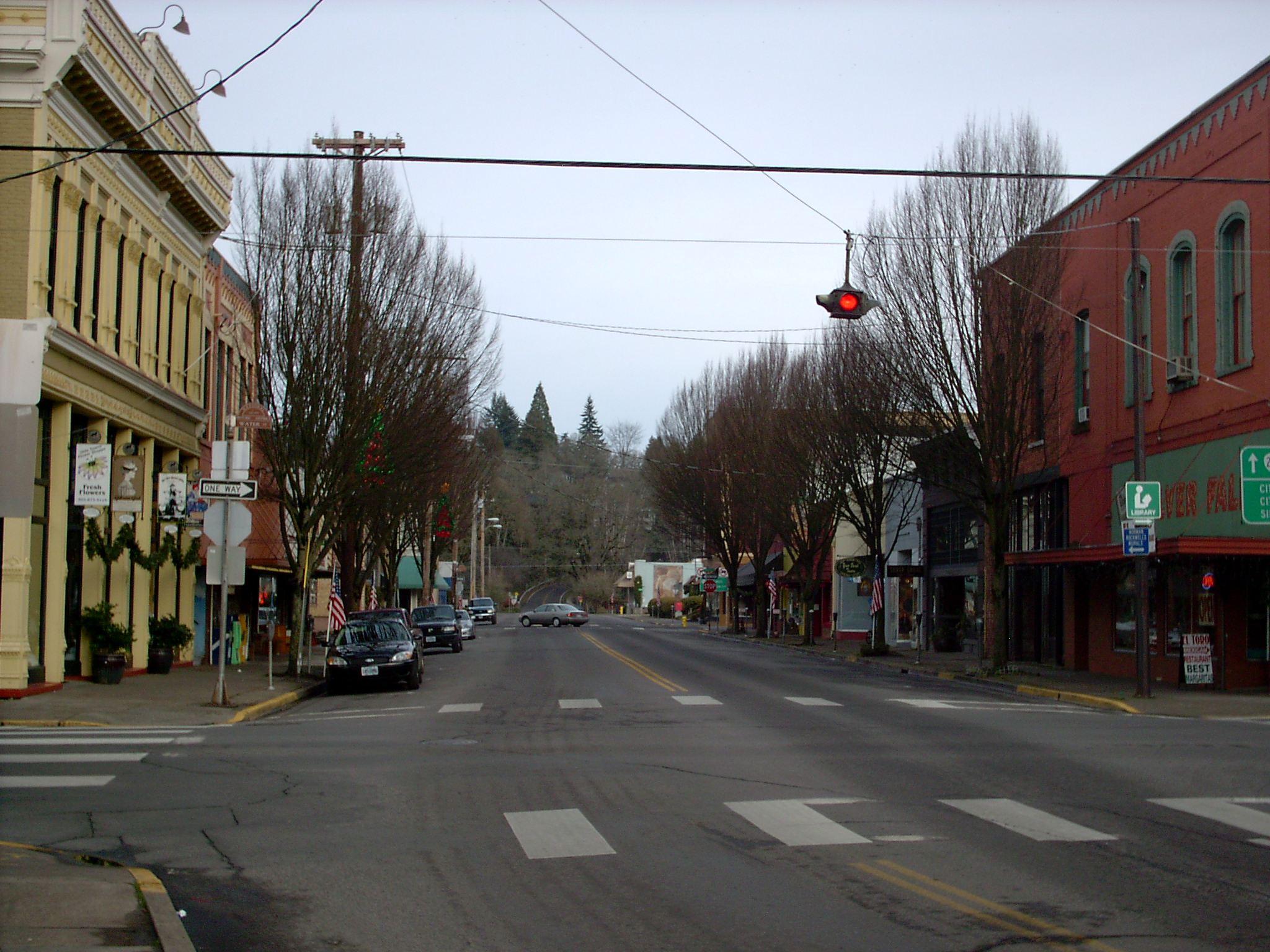
East Main Street, downtown Silverton

As of the census of 2000, there were 7,414 people, 3,452 households, and 2,442 families residing in Silverton. There were 2,865 housing units, and the population density was 2,716.3 inhabitants per square mile (1,048.8/km^{2}). Silverton's homeownership rate was 60.7%, while 39.9% of occupied housing units were rented. The median value of owner-occupied housing units was $148,800. The racial makeup of Silverton was 89.4% White, 11.6% Hispanic or Latino of any race, 1.09% Native American, 0.43% Asian, 0.21% African American, and 8.83% other races.

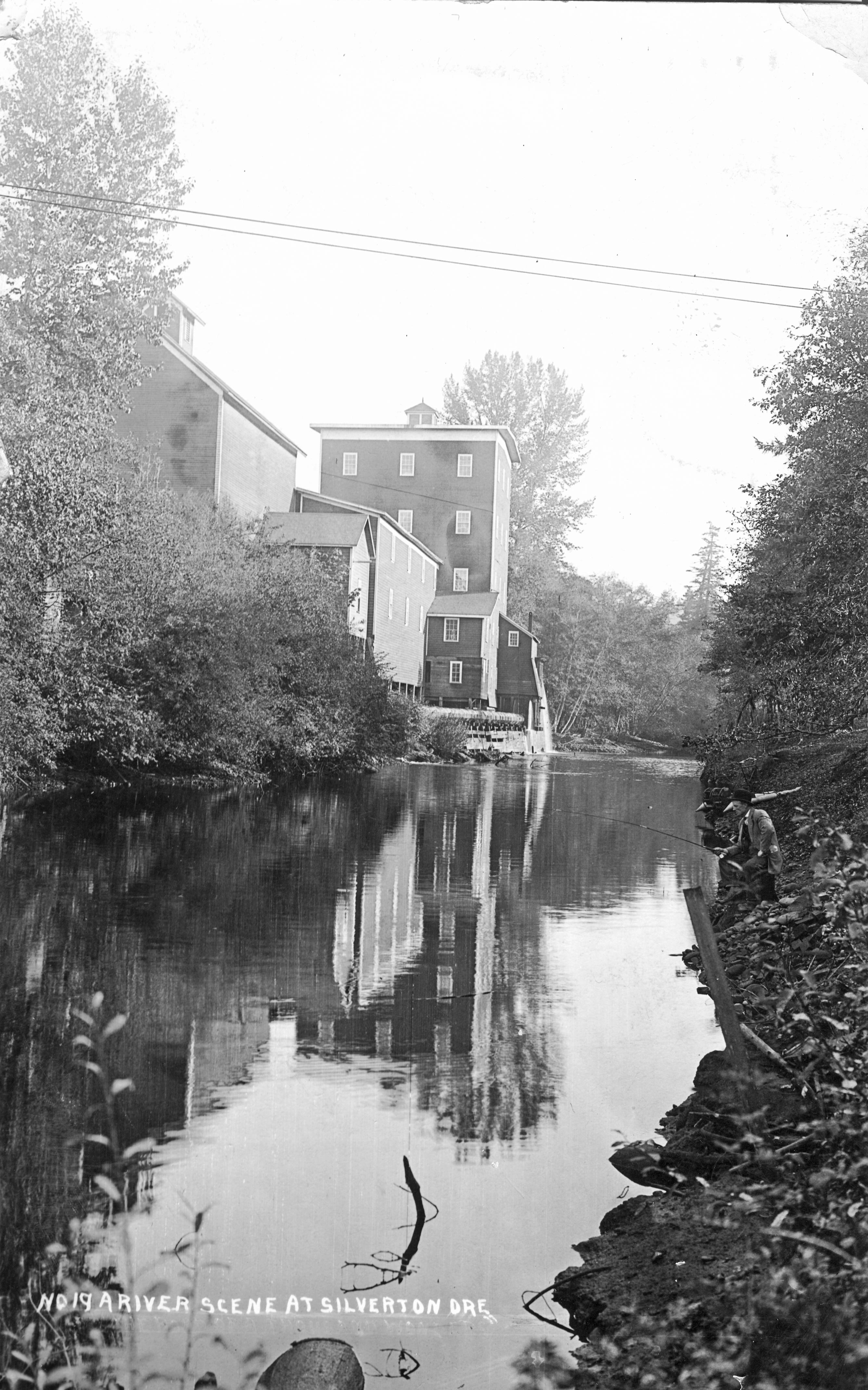
Fischer's Mill on Silver Creek in Silverton, c.1908

The median age in Silverton was 33 (31 for males and 35 for females). 37.7% were under the age of 18, 13.4% were 65 years of age or older, 47% were male and 53% female. Of the population 25 years of age and older, 7.1% possessed a graduate or professional degree, 15.3% held a bachelor's degree, 5.2% held an associate degree, 28% had some college education but no degree, while an additional 28.8% had graduated from high school or its equivalent but had not received any college education. 15.6% failed to complete high school.

The median salary for a male was $34,707 while the median for a female was $24,479. Major employers in Silverton in 2000 included the Silver Falls School District (400+ employees), Silverton Hospital (402), Champion Homes (200+), Brucepac (100+), and Mallorie's Dairy (90). The median household income was $38,429. 11.7% of Silverton households earned less than $10,000 per year, while 2.5% earned $150,000 or more. About 10.4% of families and 13.0% of the population were below the poverty line, including 18.7% of those under age 18 and 6.0% of those age 65 or over.

== Education ==
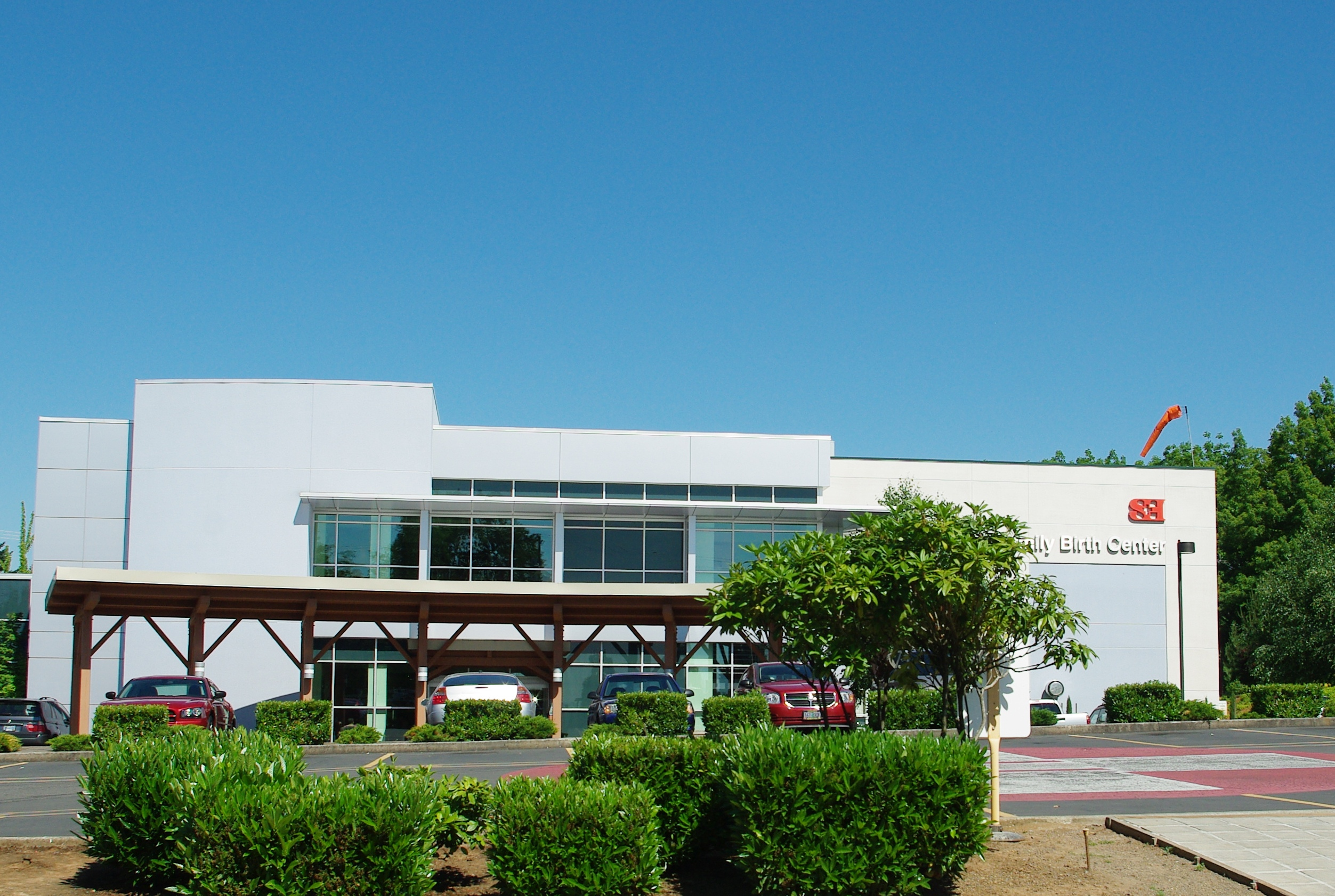
Silverton Hospital birthing center in Silverton

Silverton is the population core of the Silver Falls School District, which, in addition to Silverton, serves nearby Scotts Mills in as well as communities in the surrounding foothills up to Silver Falls State Park. Currently there are twelve elementary schools in the district, and the campus of Silverton High School on Pine Street, which was completed in 2009. Voters passed a bond levy in 1994 for construction of a new high school to be completed in two phases. The first phase of the new high school was completed in 1997, with a capacity for 500 students. The second phase was not completed until the summer of 2009, after voters passed a new bond levy in November 2006. In autumn 2009, students at the high school's old campus moved into the new campus at 802 Schlador Street. As of October 2014, the School District was seeking proposals from architectural firms for completion of the Middle School Schlador Campus Reconstruction in Silverton.

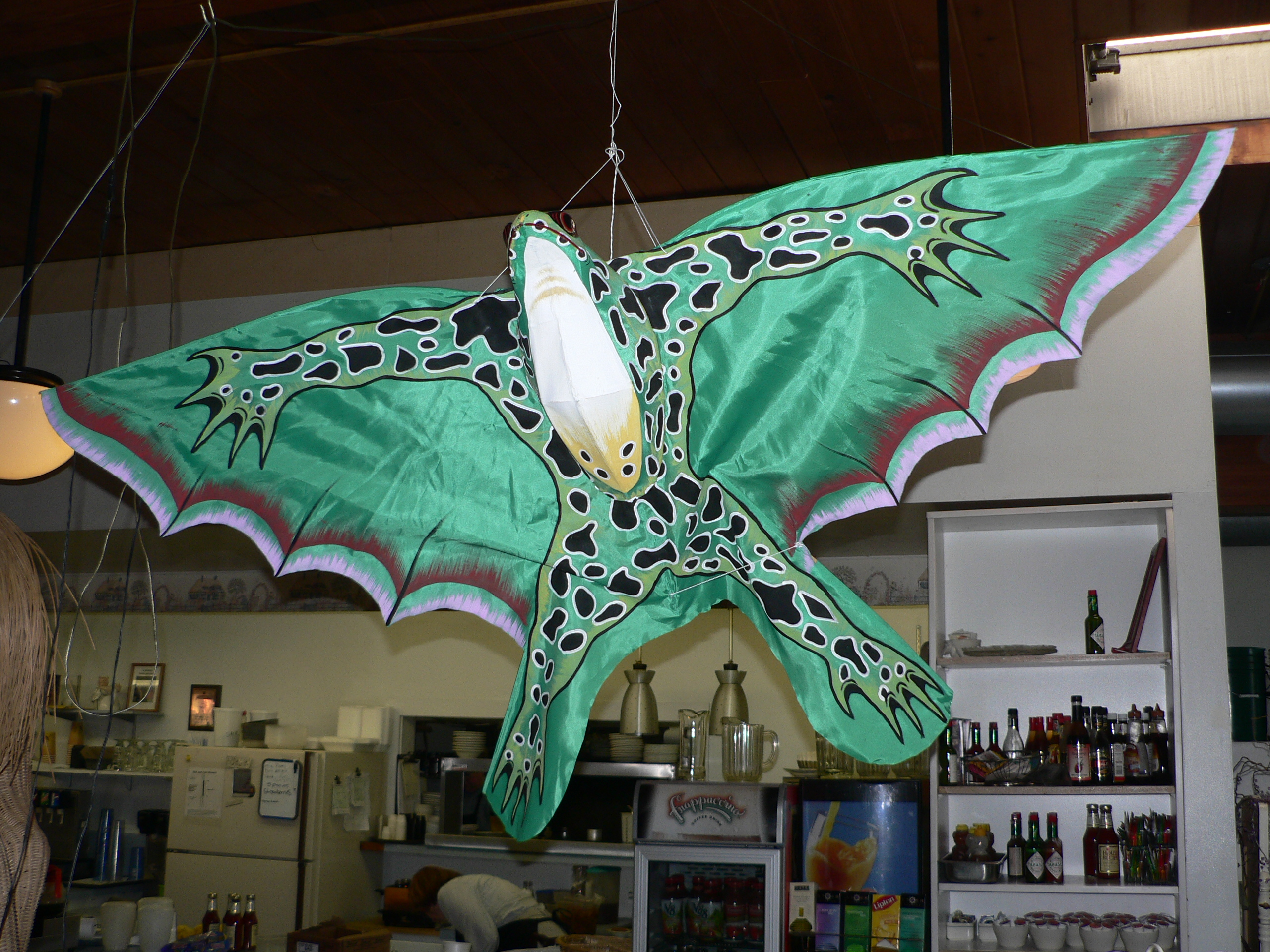
A frog kite hangs from the ceiling of O'Briens, a coffee house on Water Street

In 2006, Silverton and Silver Falls School District formed a partnership to support, maintain, and operate Silverton's local access cable channel, SCAN-TV.

In 2014, Silverton High School's enrolled students numbered 1,196. Of those students, 39% were judged to be economically disadvantaged. 36.9% were entitled to receive a free or reduced-rate lunch. 14% of the student population were disabled, 11% were English language learners. Compared to other similar high schools, Silverton High School students' scholastic achievements rated above average. The racial makeup of the school was 81.7% White, 14.5% Hispanic, 0.9% African-American, 0.6% Native American, 0.5% Asian. 1.9% were Other/Unknown.

== History ==
The first white settlers arrived at Silver Creek in the 1800s. Two settlers, James Smith and John Barger created a sawmill along the creek in 1846. The town was originally known as Milford. In 1854, the town was abandoned and the settlers moved downstream to the current spot of Silverton. The town was first known as Silver Creek but the name was changed a year later. The town expanded and grew and was incorporated in 1885. The town now housed about 229 people. The town continued to grow until now, where it now has over 10,000 people.

=== Killing of Andrew Hanlon ===
In June 2008, Silverton came to international attention when an unarmed Irish citizen, Andrew James (AJ) Hanlon, aged 20, was killed by a police officer, Tony Gonzalez, in controversial circumstances. Gonzalez, who was responding to a reported disturbance of the peace, shot the unarmed Hanlon five times, although Hanlon's sister recalled seeing seven bullets in her brother's body.

The death, which Hanlon's sister described as the only shooting in Silverton in the past twenty years, was greeted with shock there as well as in Ireland, particularly when it emerged that Hanlon had been experiencing psychological issues and had most probably gotten lost on his way home to his sister's house in Silverton. Complaints were made by Hanlon's family that it took six hours for the police to inform his sister of her brother's death, despite her living only a mile away, and questions were asked why the police had not used a tazer, which was available to them. Requests for transparency were greeted by obfuscation and secrecy and claims that, in Andrew Hanlon's mother's words, the city's establishment "had closed ranks on" the Hanlon family to protect Gonzalez. while the Consulate in San Francisco of the Government of Ireland registered concern over the killing. Protests outside Silverton City Hall were also ignored. On 24 July 2008, a Marion County grand jury found that because Gonzalez had testified that he believed that Andrew James Hanlon was armed, his killing was justified. Eight days later, on August 1, 2008, and just over a month after Andrew was killed on the 30th of June, Gonzalez resigned from Silverton's police department. He had been arrested in July and charged with child abuse. On December 7, 2008, Gonzalez was sentenced to 6 years and 3 months imprisonment when he pleaded guilty to sexually abusing a teenage girl.

== Points of interest ==
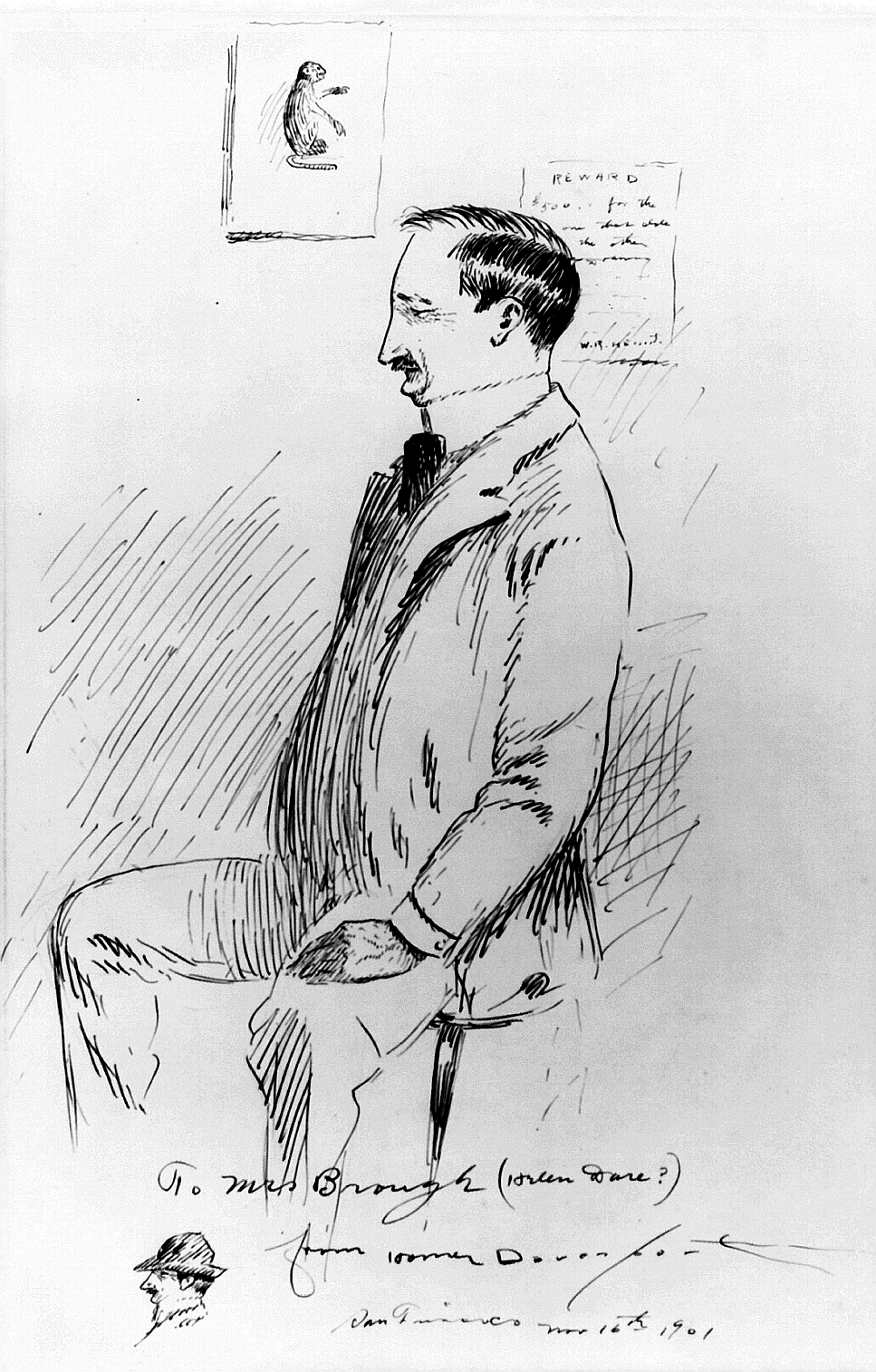
Political cartoonist Homer Davenport's self-portrait, November 1901

- Silverton is the gateway to Silver Falls State Park, Oregon's largest state park. Town Square Park in downtown is a small park with a footbridge crossing Silverton Creek and a war memorial.
- The Oregon Garden, a 130-acre (53 ha) botanical park, is in Silverton.
- Shrine of Bobbie the Wonder Dog replica of Bobbie and his 1920s era doghouse
- Gordon House, located on the grounds of Silverton's Oregon Garden, is the only house in the Pacific Northwest designed by Frank Lloyd Wright which is open to the public. Gordon House was one of the last of Lloyd Wright's famed Usonian designs.
- Silverton has a number of outsized murals, including Norman Rockwell's The Four Freedoms originally painted on the side of a building located at 402 Main Street in Silverton, and visible from Second Street In 2015, the original building was razed and, after abandoning hopes to salvage them, the murals were destroyed during demolition. However, community efforts replaced them with a new replica at 990 N. First St.
- Every August, the Homer Davenport Community Festival celebrates Silverton's most famous citizen—writer, political cartoonist, and Arabian horse breeder Homer Davenport (1867–1912)—with exhibits, entertainment, an arts and crafts fair, rides, races, contests, a cartooning competition, a party, and a parade.
- The Palace Theater in Silverton's Commercial Historic District is a movie theater constructed in the early 1900s. Originally called the Opera House, it has been showing motion pictures to the public since at least 1909. The Palace Theater has survived two fires, one in 1935 that destroyed a large portion of downtown, and the other in April 2012. The 2012 fire was mostly limited to the concession area, although the smoke damage was extensive and caused at least one other business to temporarily close. The theater was later co-owned by the former mayor, Stu Rasmussen, the first openly transgender mayor in the United States.

== Notable people ==
- Greg Craven, climate change activist who produced a viral video on YouTube
- Homer Davenport, political cartoonist
- Debi Farr, member of the Oregon legislature
- Scott Gragg, NFL tackle
- Bill Grier, college basketball coach, formerly head coach at University of San Diego
- Donald Pettit, astronaut
- Stu Rasmussen, first openly transgender mayor in the United States

== Media ==
- The Appeal
- The first bank robbery and chase scene in the movie Bandits was filmed in Silverton.
- Fire! was shot partially in Silverton.
