= Murals of Silverton, Oregon =

Series of public artworks in Silverton, Oregon, U.S.

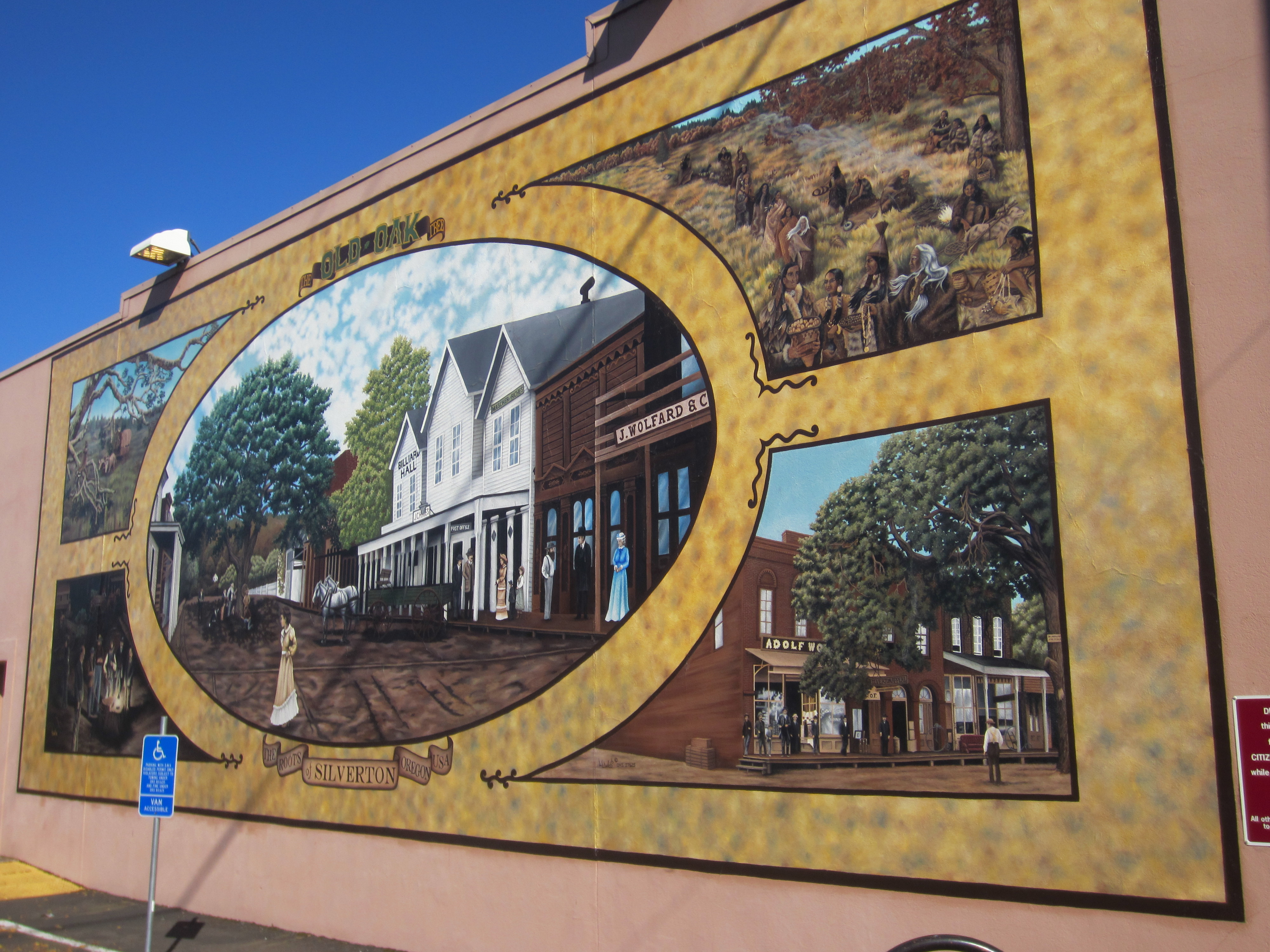
One of Silverton, Oregon's murals in 2020

The city of Silverton, Oregon, has more than 30 murals displayed in public spaces. Many have been funded and maintained by the Silverton Mural Society, established in 1992. The artworks focus on local history and people, such as Homer Davenport, Donald Pettit, and Bobbie the Wonder Dog. Norman Rockwell's Four Freedoms (1943) series was reproduced in Silverton in 1994.

== History ==
The Silverton Mural Society, established in 1992, has supported the installation of 30 approximately murals, as of early 2018. The group's formation was inspired by Chemainus, British Columbia's mural program and accompanied the creation of the Silverton Murals Beautification Team. The murals are well-maintained, costing the Silverton Mural Society approximately $10,000–$12,000 annually, as of 2017.

== Works ==
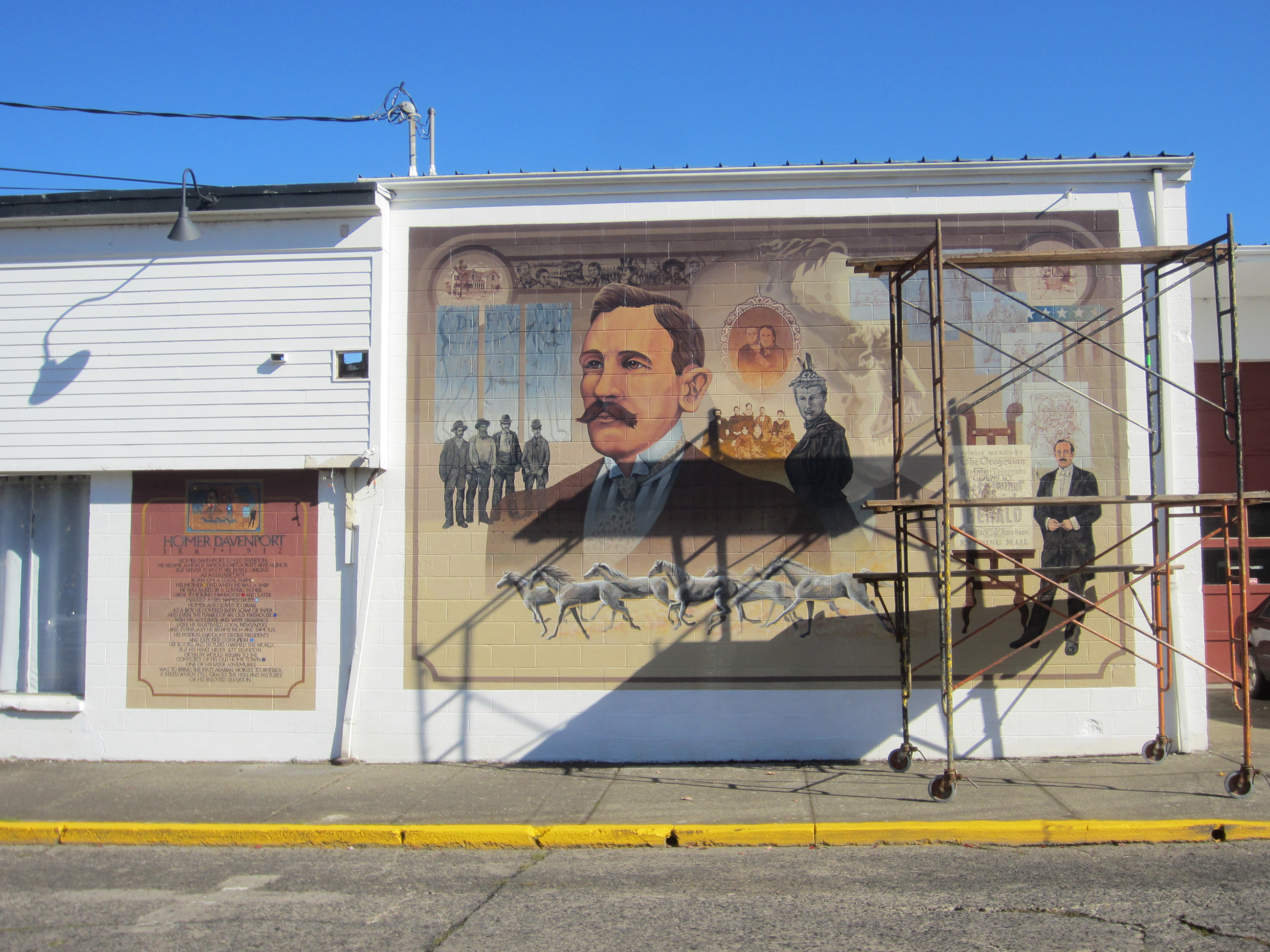
Mural depicting Homer Davenport, 2020

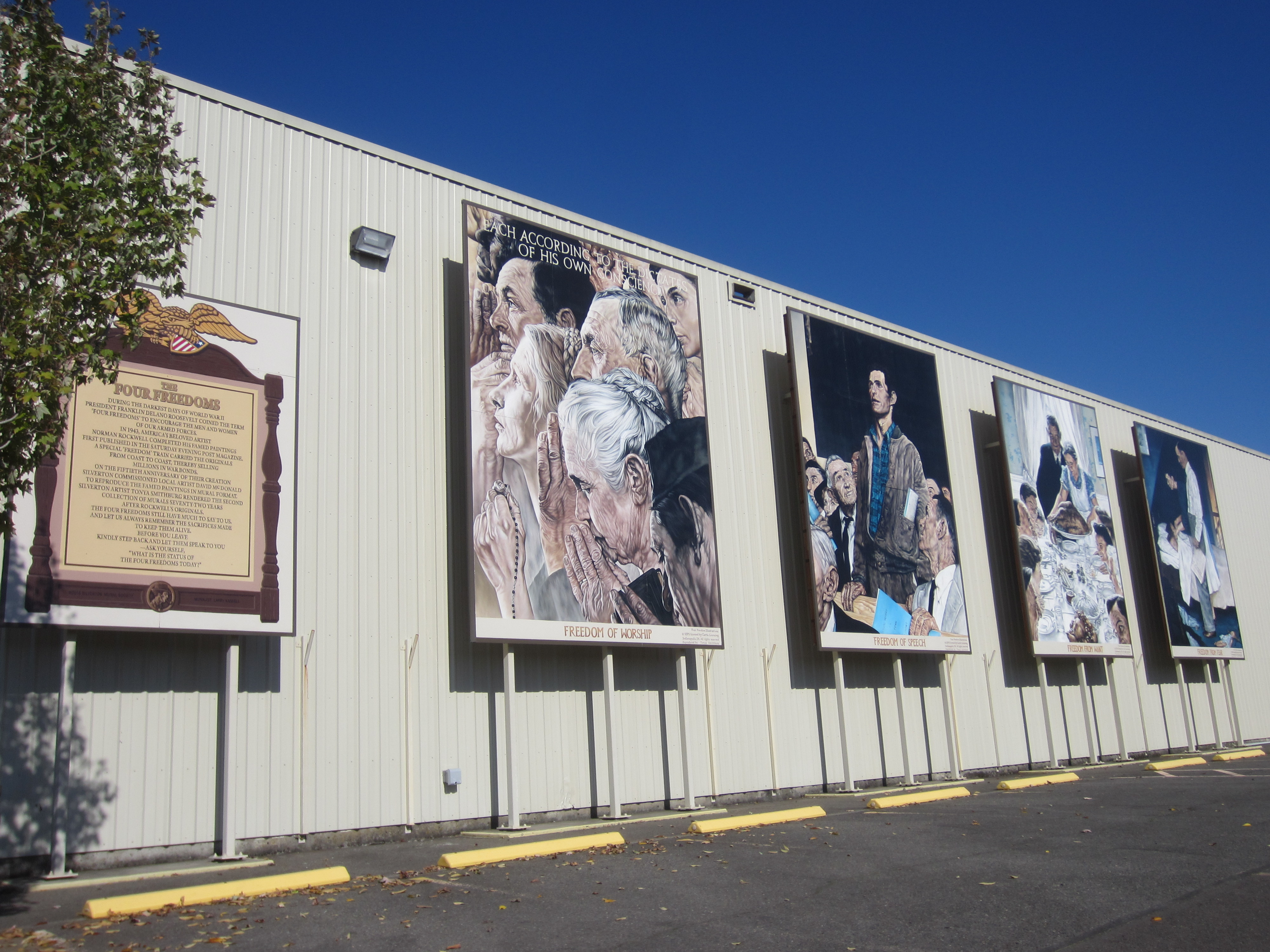
Depiction of Norman Rockwell's Four Freedoms (1943) series in 2020

Silverton has "an usually high number of murals" displayed on the exteriors of buildings in downtown, focused on local history and people. The city's murals use oil-based paints, as opposed to water-based acrylics, and are coated with ultraviolet protection. Artworks depict Homer Davenport, Donald Pettit, and Bobbie the Wonder Dog, as well as Norman Rockwell's Four Freedoms (1943) series.

The 70-foot (21 m) long mural of Bobbie is installed along Town Square Park. The reproduced Four Freedoms series was completed by David McDonald in 1994. Mammoth and The Oregon Trail are the city's oldest artworks, installed in 1992.

The iPhone app Silverton Murals describes the history of specific artworks to users.

== Reception ==
According to The Oregonian's Terry Richard and Mike Davis, "Silverton's decade-long affair with murals has been good for business, getting some visitors out of their cars and gives them an excuse to walk around town." Justin Much of the Statesman Journal has said the murals are "one of the drawing points that helps maintain Silverton as a magnet for many visitors annually".

== See also ==
- Murals of Estacada, Oregon
