= Ralph Carey Geer =

American politician

Member of the Oregon Territorial Legislature
- In office 1854–1855
- Constituency: Marion County

County Clerk
- In office July 1868 – June 1870
- Constituency: Marion County

Personal details
- Born: March 13, 1816 Willimantic, Connecticut
- Died: January 9, 1895 (aged 78) Waldo Hills, Oregon
- Spouse: Mary Catherine Willard
- Relations: Homer Davenport

Ralph Carey Geer (March 13, 1816 – January 9, 1895) was an American farmer and politician in what became the state of Oregon. A native of Connecticut, he lived in Ohio and Illinois before taking the Oregon Trail west to Oregon where he started a nursery and later raised livestock and grew flax. At times a Republican and later a Democrat, he served in the Oregon House of Representatives and as the clerk for the county. He was related to both Homer Davenport and T. T. Geer.

== Early life ==
Ralph C. Geer was born to Joseph Carey Geer, Sr. and Mary Johnson Geer on March 13, 1816, in Willimantic, Connecticut, a former city now located in the town of Windham in Windham County, Connecticut. The family moved to Madison County, Ohio, when he was still a boy. On January 8, 1837, he married Mary Catherine Willard in London, Ohio, and later moved to Farmington in Knox County, Illinois. In 1847, Geer and his family immigrated to the Oregon Country over the Oregon Trail. The couple had six children in all with two of them born in Oregon. Mary Geer was born September 8, 1851, and the youngest of them Angeline, was born on October 8, 1853, dying at two and half years of age on March 23, 1856.

Geer settled east of Salem in the Waldo Hills and began building a nursery using the apple and pear seedlings he carried with him across the plains to Oregon. Geer spent time as a teacher, imported English sheep to Oregon in 1858, and was a pioneer of flax growing in the Willamette Valley.

== Cayuse War ==
The Whitman Massacre contributed greatly to the environment that resulted into what is known as the Cayuse War with Native Americans. Several companies of men were organized in response to the war and in 1848 Geer served as Captain of one assigned to protecting the Willamette Valley. In March of that year, he led his troops into the Battle of Abiqua Creek.

== Political career ==
In 1854, he was elected to the Oregon Territorial Legislature to represent Marion County. He served during the 1854 to 1855 session in the lower House of Representatives. In July 1868 he was elected Clerk of Marion County and served a single two-year term, leaving office in June 1870.

== Later years and family ==
Ralph Geer was the uncle of Oregon Governor Theodore Thurston Geer. He was also the grandfather of political cartoonist Homer Davenport. Ralph Carey Geer died in the Waldo Hills on January 9, 1895, at the age of 79 and was buried at Mt. Hope Pioneer Cemetery east of Salem in the Waldo Hills. Geer's house, still located on his original Donation Land Claim is listed on the National Register of Historic Places as the R. C. Geer Farmhouse.

== See also ==
- Theodore Thurston Geer § Family history and legacy
