= Murals of Estacada, Oregon =

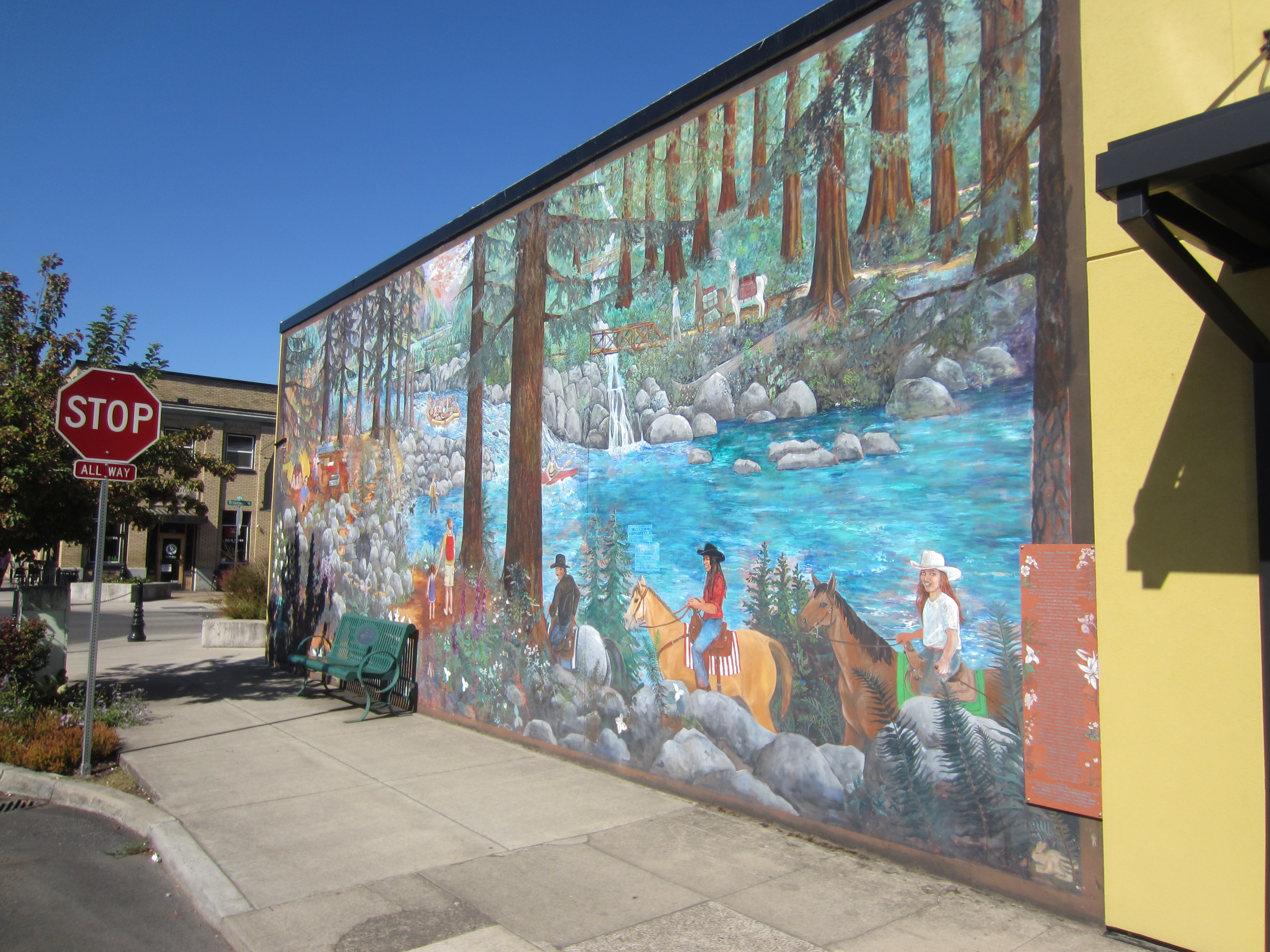
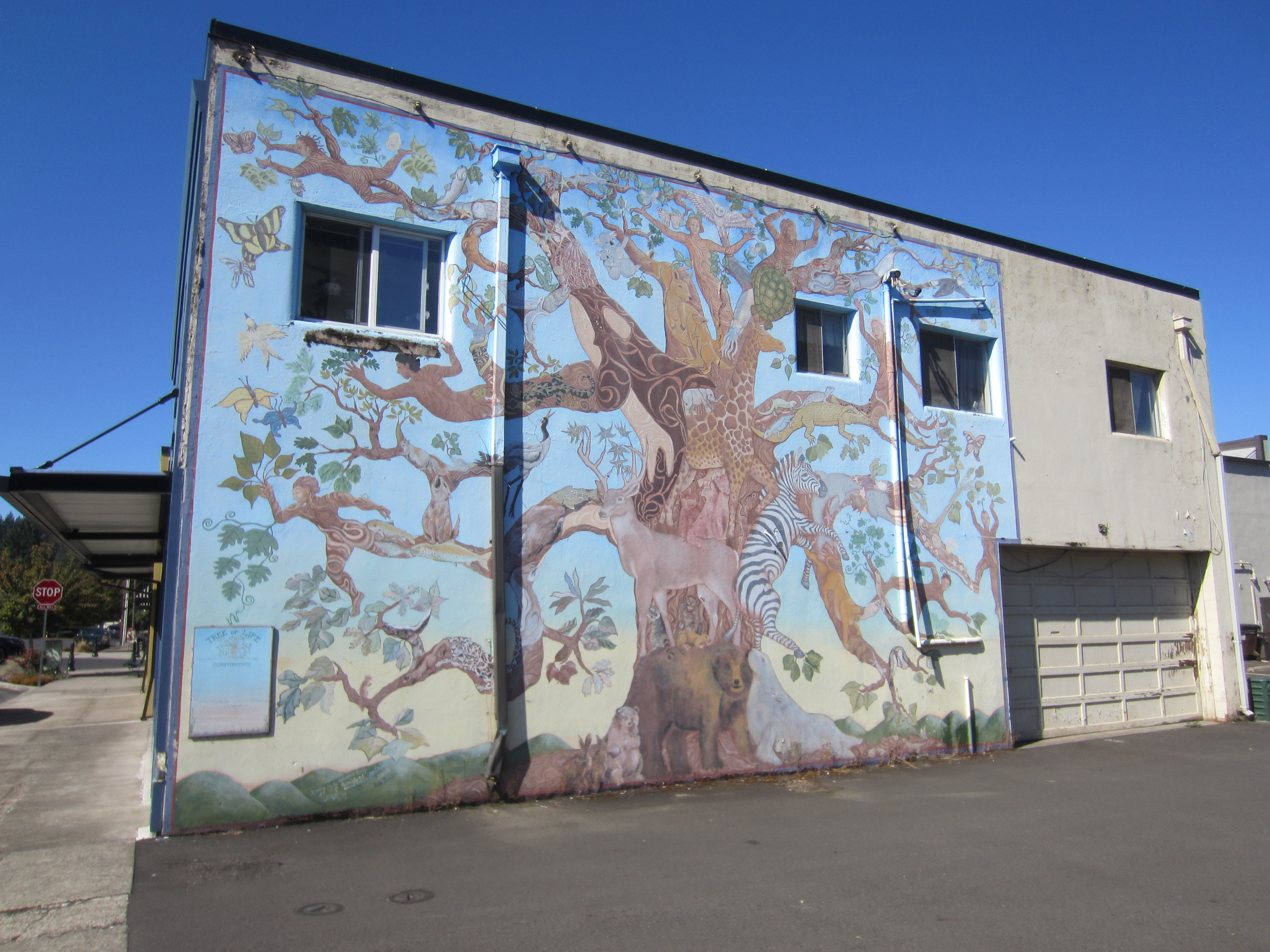
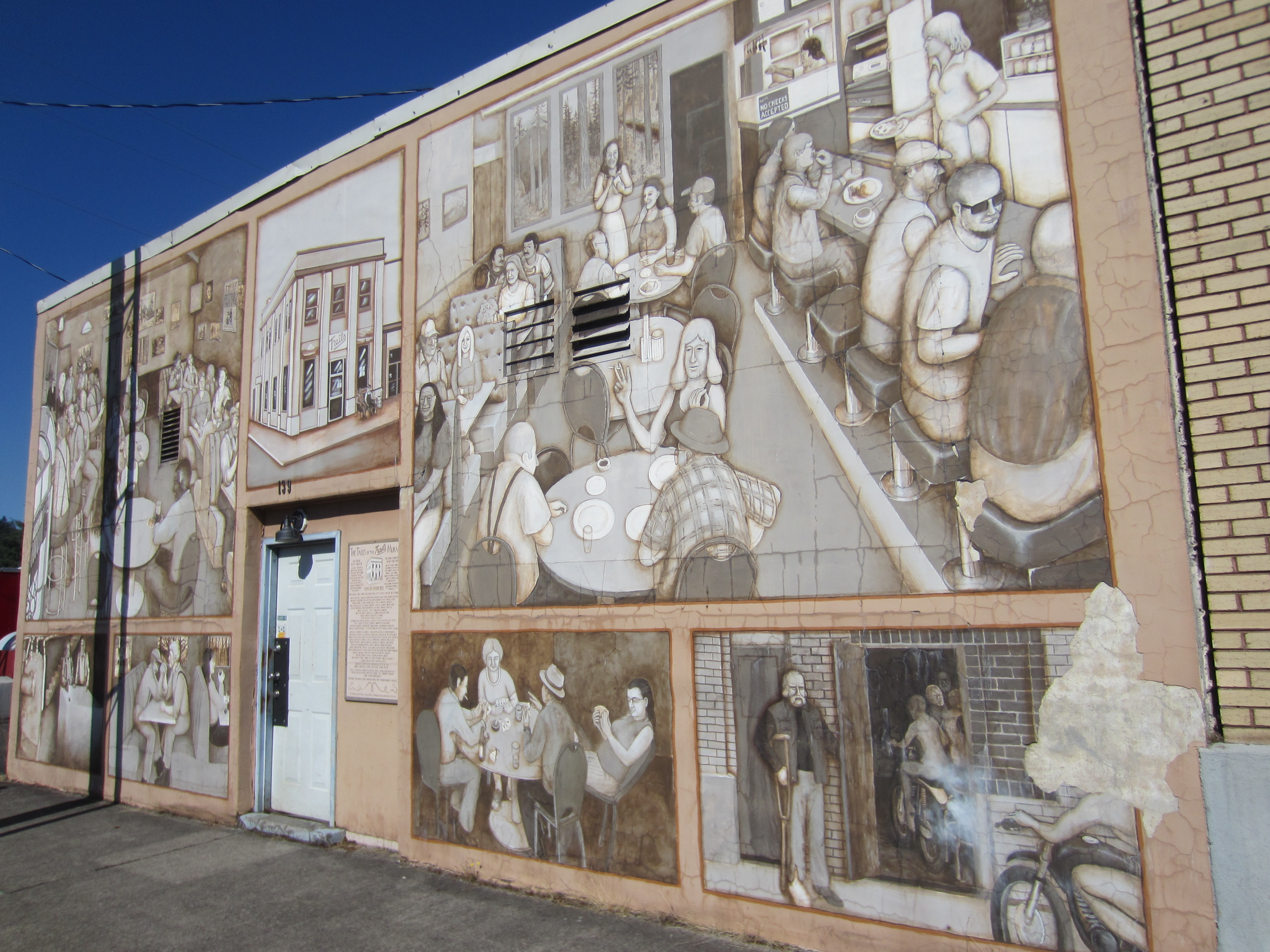
Murals in 2021

Estacada, Oregon has an extensive collection of public murals. According to 1859's Catie Joyce-Bulay, the city displayed 21 murals, as of 2018. Among them are paintings depicting a Native American tribe fishing at Celilo Falls, a person foraging mushrooms in a forest, and Chinese Americans harvesting ginseng.

== History ==
Many of the murals have been painted by a group known as the Artback Artists Cooperative, or simply Artback. The group was founded and completed its first mural, Fishing the Clackamas, in 1994. Members have included Kolieha Bush, Joe Cotter, and Jenny Joyce. The group also works for restore old murals.

In 2020, Francesca Bryk, Mesa Pivirotto and Sage Pivirotto—children of the group's founding members—created The Natural World on the exterior of a Dollar General store. According to Estacada News' Emily Lindstrand, the mural is the city's first to depict subjects other than people and "follows the artistic style of tarot cards".

== Works ==
- Fishing the Clackamas (1994)
- Kinzy Faire Garden (Am Griswold, 2000)
- The Natural World (2020)

== See also ==
- Murals of Silverton, Oregon
