= Salem Hills =

Range of hills near Salem, Oregon, United States

Coordinates: 44.843176°N 123.068429°W

- Location within Oregon

The Salem Hills are a range of hills spanning from southern Salem, Oregon, United States, south to Jefferson, west to the Willamette River and east to Turner and Marion.

They have also been called the Ankeny Hills, Chemeketa Hills, Illahee Hills, Red Clay Hills, Red Hills, and the South Salem Hills.

The Salem Hills have an elevation of between 600 and 700 feet.

== Geology ==
In 1945, the State of Oregon Department of Geology and Mineral Industries researched the composition of the Salem Hills, and found bauxite. At the time, there was an expectation that the post-war demand for aluminum would decrease, so additional study into the area was not done. In 1953, as demand for bauxite continued to grow, there was an additional survey done, which found that basaltic lava created the deposits of ferruginous bauxite, believed to be of the Miocene age. The area was never mined.

== See also ==
- Eola Hills
- Waldo Hills
