= Waldo Hills =

Range of hills in the Willamette Valley, Oregon, U.S.

Coordinates: 44.89583°N 122.86056°W

The Waldo Hills are a range of hills in the Willamette Valley of Oregon, United States. Encompassing an area of around 50 square miles (130 km^{2}), the hills are located east of Salem. The hills are named after pioneer Daniel Waldo.

== Geology ==
The hills stretch out from Mill Creek in a northeasterly direction. These hills were formed by a cuesta of Columbia River Basalt Group. Rocks of the hills include Tertiary volcanic bedrock, sedimentary bedrock, and Plio-Pleistocene sedimentary basin fill shaped by elongate domical folds. The Waldo Hills form part of the divider between the upper and lower Willamette Valley. Additionally, the Waldo Hills as part of a larger fault system of low-lying hills in the mid-valley, are the largest geological structure in the mid-Willamette Valley. Along with the Silverton Hills, these hills form the foothills to the Cascade Mountains to the east.

== Settlement ==
Euro-American settlement of the Waldo Hills began in 1843 when Daniel Waldo settled a land claim there and began farming. Later settlers included Homer Davenport and Samuel L. Simpson, along with Waldo's sons John and William. In 1846, the hills were the site of the formation and drilling of the Oregon Rangers, a militia formed by the Provisional Government of Oregon.

== See also ==
- Eola Hills
- Howell Prairie
- Salem Hills
- Theodore Thurston Geer
