= Theodore Thurston Geer =

10th Governor of Oregon

Theodore T. Geer
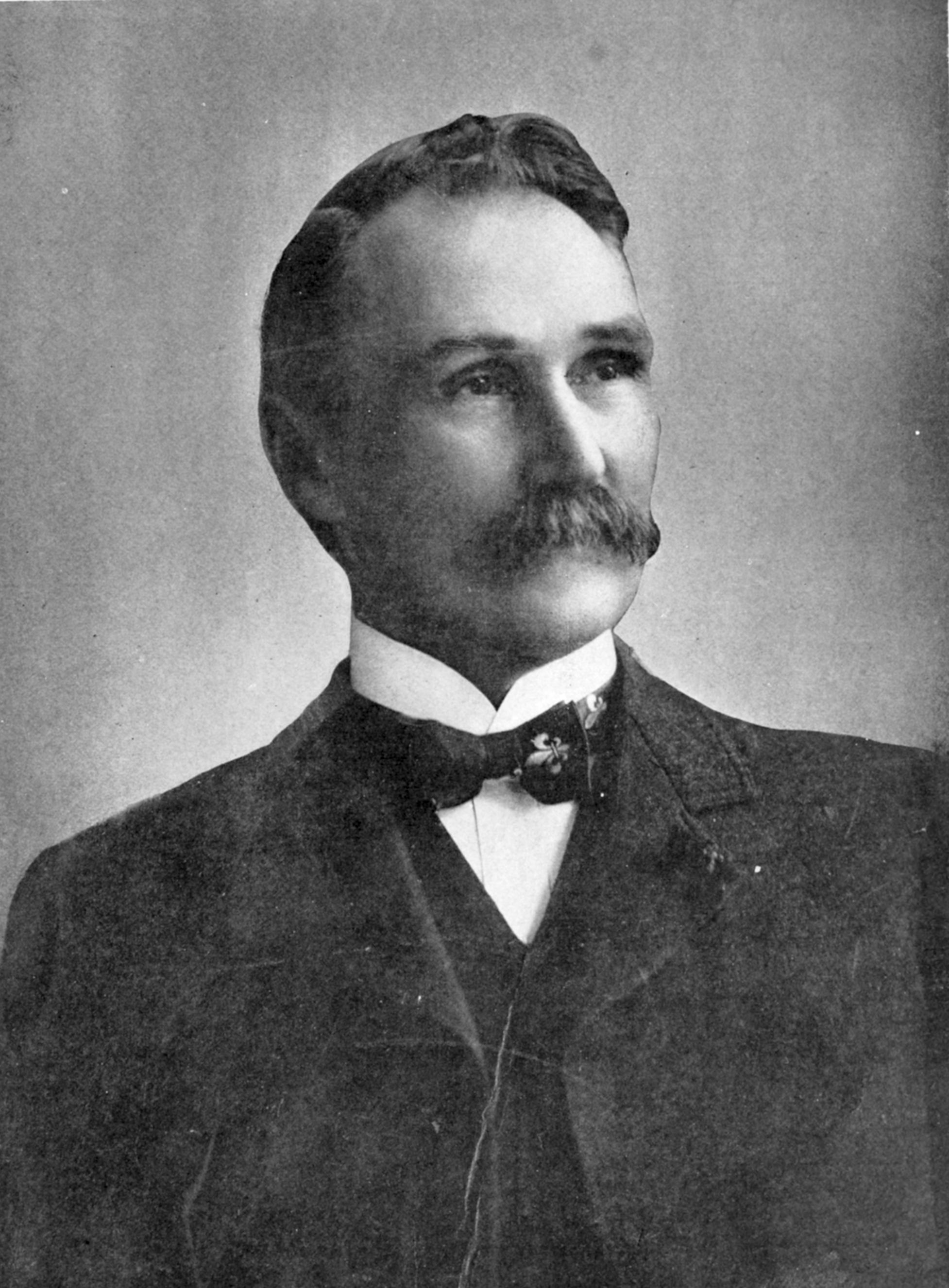

10th Governor of Oregon
- In office January 9, 1899 – January 14, 1903
- Preceded by: William Paine Lord
- Succeeded by: George Earle Chamberlain

17th Speaker of the Oregon House of Representatives
- In office 1891–1892
- Preceded by: E. L. Smith
- Succeeded by: W. P. Keady
- Constituency: Marion County

Personal details
- Born: March 12, 1851 Waldo Hills, Oregon Territory
- Died: February 21, 1924 (aged 72) Portland, Oregon, US
- Party: Republican
- Spouse(s): Nancy Batte Duncan; Isabelle Trullinger
- Profession: Journalist, farmer
- Office information

Theodore Thurston Geer (March 12, 1851 – February 21, 1924) was the tenth governor of Oregon (the first born in the territory of the state), serving from January 9, 1899, to January 14, 1903. The Republican politician was in office when the legislature adopted the "Oregon System", Oregon's system of initiative and referendum. He also served in the Oregon House of Representatives, including time as its Speaker.

== Biography ==
=== Early life ===
Theodore Geer was born on March 12, 1851, in the Waldo Hills east of Salem, in what was then the Oregon Territory. His parents, Heman Johnson Geer and Cynthia Ann Eoff, separated when Theodore was 14 years old. Geer was educated in the Salem schools and at Willamette University in Salem.

After his parents separated he began working, and in 1866 he moved to the Grande Ronde Valley with his father. While living in Eastern Oregon, Geer wrote letters to the Blue Mountain Times newspaper. In 1877, he returned to the Willamette Valley and the Waldo Hills where he farmed.

=== Political career ===
In 1880, Geer was elected to the Oregon Legislative Assembly, representing Marion County in the House of Representatives. He returned to the House in 1889, serving through the 1893 legislative session, and serving as Speaker of the House in 1891. He served as a Presidential Elector in 1897.

Theodore Geer was elected as the 10th Governor of Oregon in 1898 to replace William Paine Lord, defeating Democrat and Populist party nominee W. R. King. A Republican governor, he served one term from January 9, 1899, until January 14, 1903. Geer was the tenth governor since statehood, but the first native Oregonian to hold that position.

Geer supported the first amendment to the 1857 Oregon Constitution that instituted the initiative and referendum system of legislation in Oregon. The amendment was passed by the Oregon Legislative Assembly in 1899 and 1901, and approved by the Oregon voters in 1902. Geer did not win re-nomination for a second term and left the office in 1903.

=== Bicycling ===
Geer was known for being an enthusiastic participant in the 1890s bicycle craze, and the governor-elect signed the 1899 "cycle path" legislation passed by the State Legislature that was to create a statewide network of bicycle paths. Governor Geer regularly bicycled from his home in Macleay to the Capitol.

=== Final years ===
After leaving political office, he worked as the editor of the Oregon Statesman newspaper from 1903 to 1905, and then owned the Pendleton Tribune from 1905 until 1908. In 1908, Geer moved to Portland, Oregon, where he published Fifty Years in Oregon in 1911. Theodore Thurston Geer then worked in real estate before dying on February 21, 1924, in Portland.

=== Family history and legacy ===
In 1870, Geer married Nancy Batte Duncan, and they had three children together. Geer was married a second time in 1900, to Miss Isabelle Trullinger.

There are several places in Marion County named for the Geer family, who settled in the Waldo Hills and on Howell Prairie. The "Geer Branch" off the Southern Pacific railroad's main Willamette Valley line once ran from the Salem station to Geer station on the prairie. The line was later used by the Willamette Valley Railway. The Waldo Hills home of Ralph Carey Geer, an uncle of T. T. Geer and a member of the Oregon Territorial Legislature, is listed on the National Register of Historic Places as the R. C. Geer Farmhouse. It is located on R. C. Geer's original Donation Land Claim.

For 155 years, Geer ancestors have lived on the same farm pioneered by R. C. Geer, who in 1847 was among the first people to travel to the Willamette Valley via the Barlow Road portion of the Oregon Trail. The farm, known today as GeerCrest (formerly Vesper Geer Rose Ranch), is now run as a teaching farm. The farm is also known as the childhood home of Silverton political cartoonist Homer Davenport, whose mother, Florinda, was a member of the Geer family.

GeerCrest is the location of a large black cottonwood tree, known as the "Riding Whip Tree", which grew from a stick used as a horseback-riding whip and later pushed into the ground by 15-year-old Florinda Geer in 1854. It is listed as an Oregon Heritage Tree. Geer Community Park in Salem is also named for the Geer family, and is located near a former section of the Geer Branch that was abandoned and later decommissioned.

== Works ==
- Fifty Years in Oregon. New York: Neal Publishing Co., 1912.

Party political offices
Preceded by William Paine Lord	Republican nominee for Governor of Oregon; 1898	Succeeded by W. J. Furnish
Political offices
Preceded by William Paine Lord	Governor of Oregon; 1899–1903	Succeeded by George Earle Chamberlain
