= Eola Hills =

Range of hills northwest of Salem, Oregon, United States

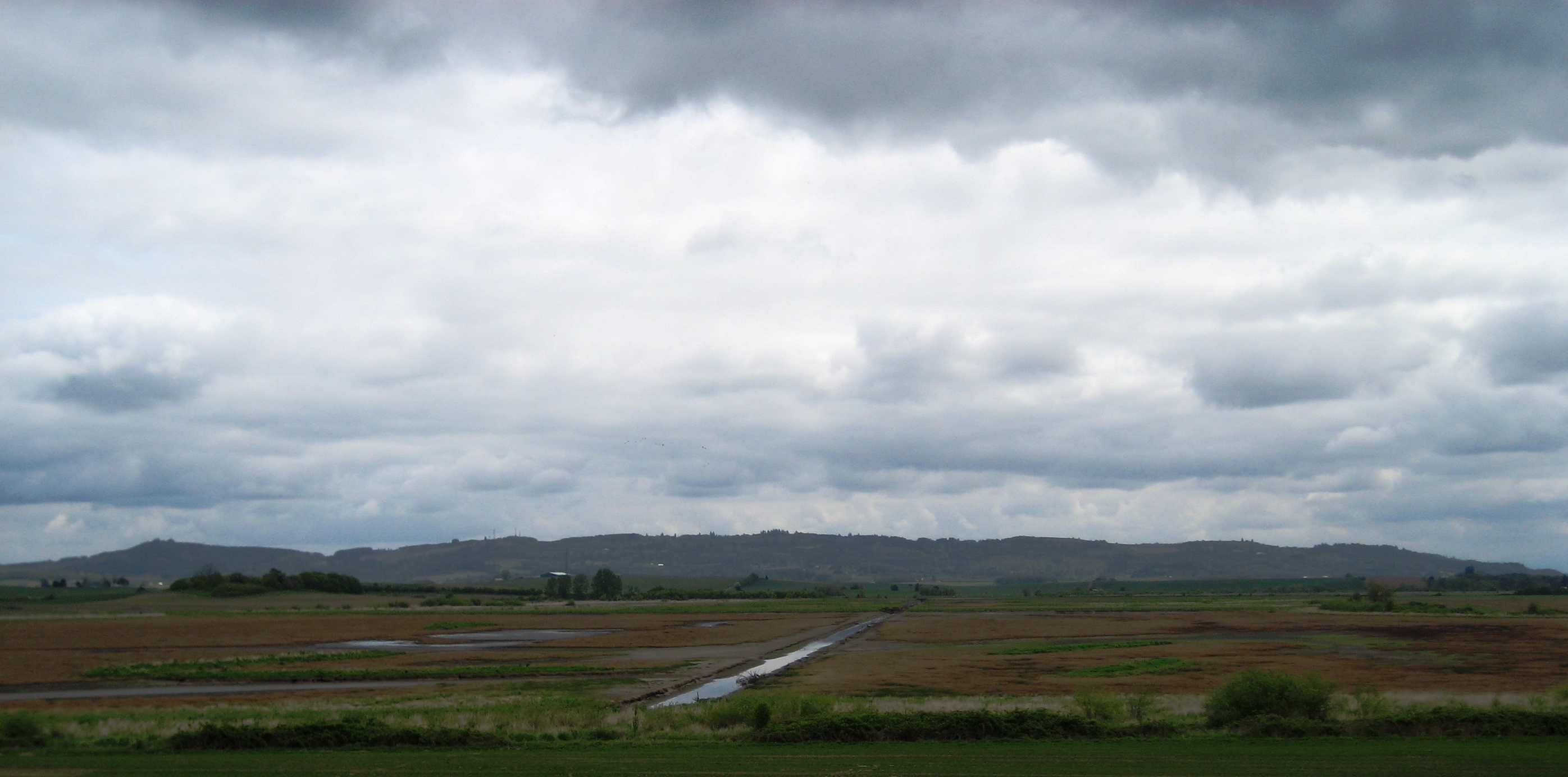
- Eola Hills

Highest point
- Elevation: 1,170 ft (360 m)

Geography
- Location within Oregon
- Country: United States
- State: Oregon
- County: Yamhill County
- Range coordinates: 45°4′31.425″N 123°7′25.362″W
- Topo map: USGS Mission Bottom

The Eola Hills are a range of hills northwest of Salem, Oregon, United States. They stretch from the community of Eola about 10 miles (16 km) north to Yamhill County.

They are divided from the Salem Hills by the Willamette River at Eola.

== See also ==
- Eola-Amity Hills AVA
- Bethel Heights Vineyard, one of the first vineyards planted on the Eola Hills
