= List of waterfalls in Oregon =

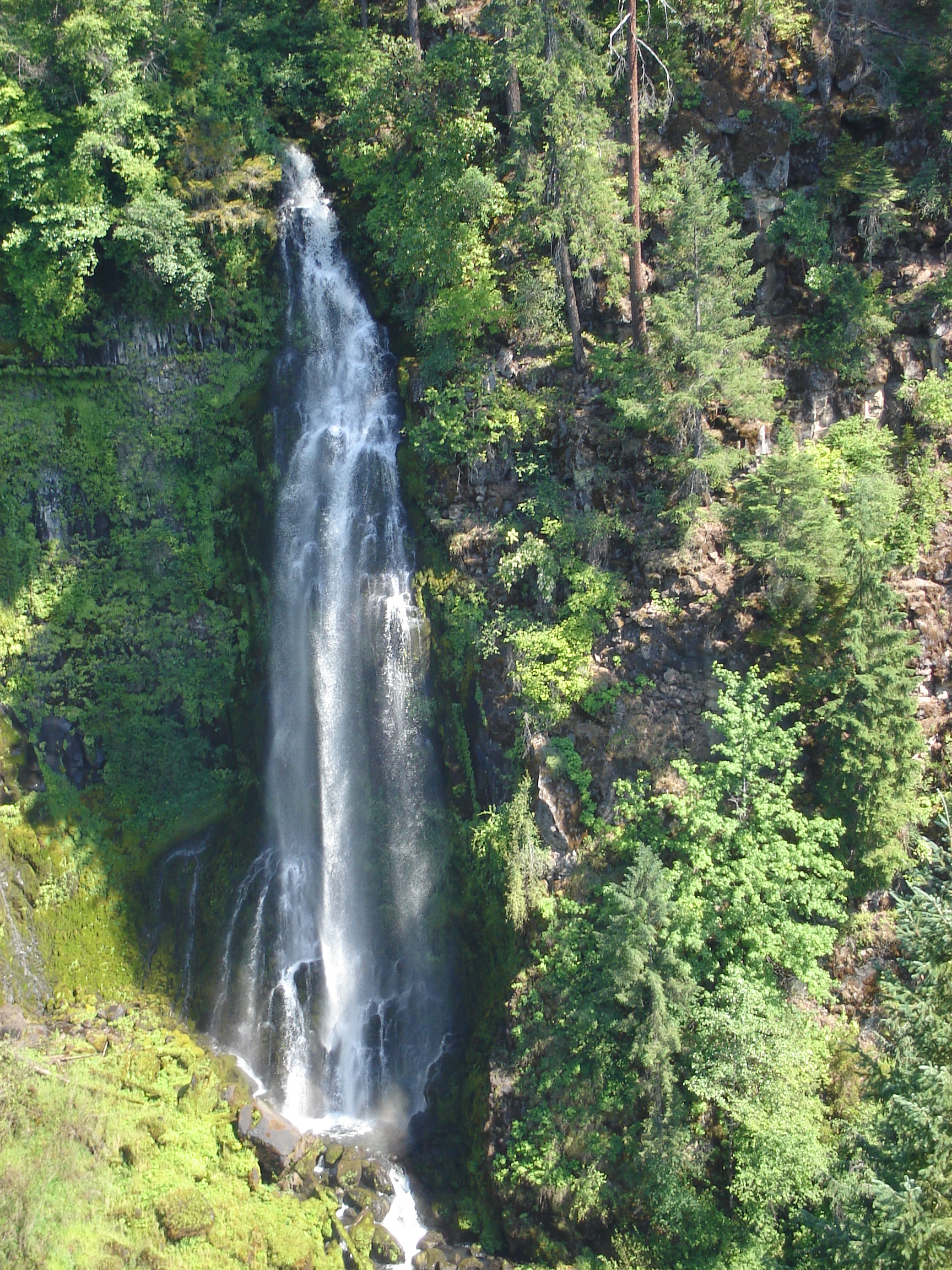
Barr Creek Falls in southern Oregon

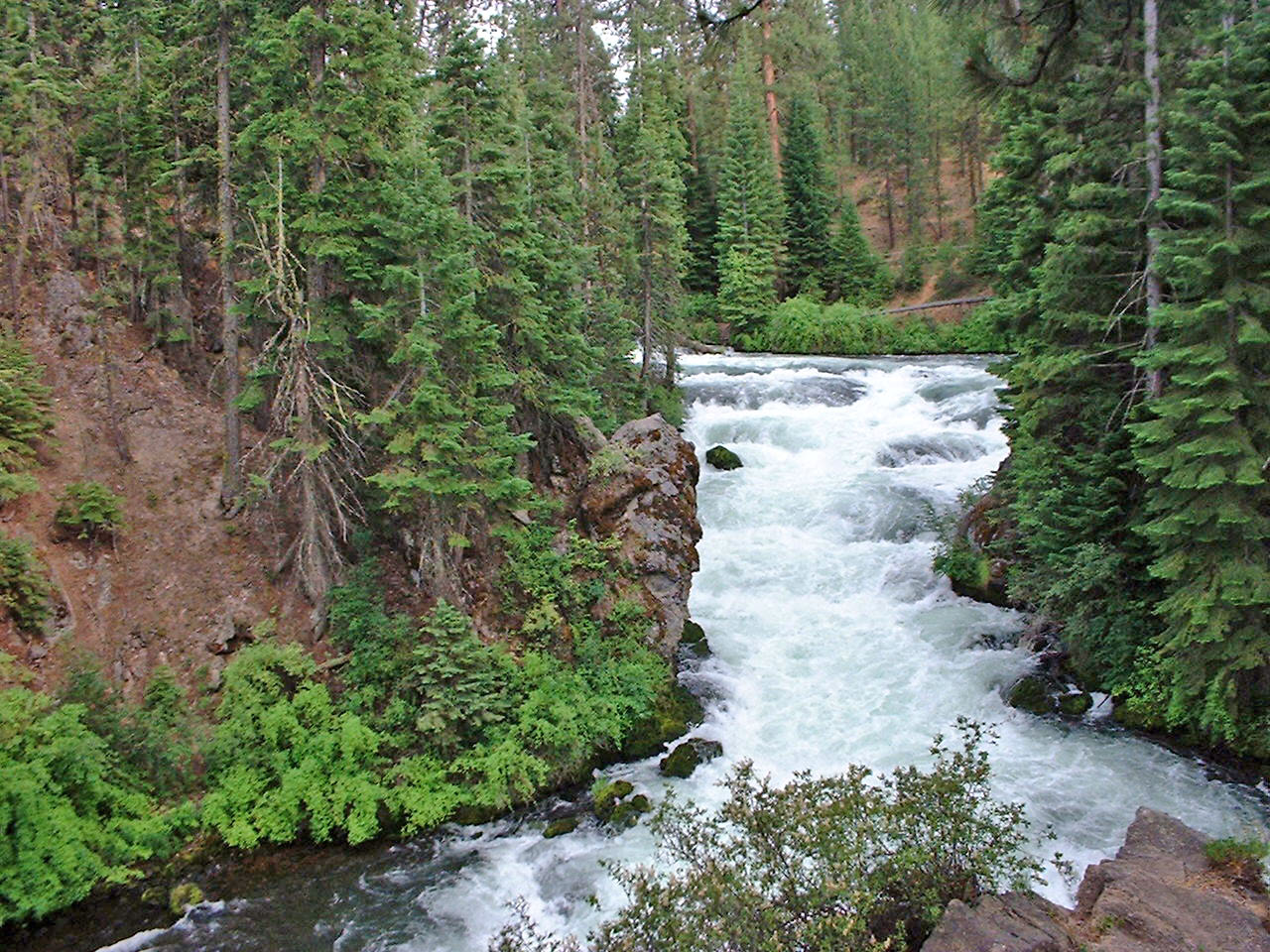
Benham Falls on the Deschutes River

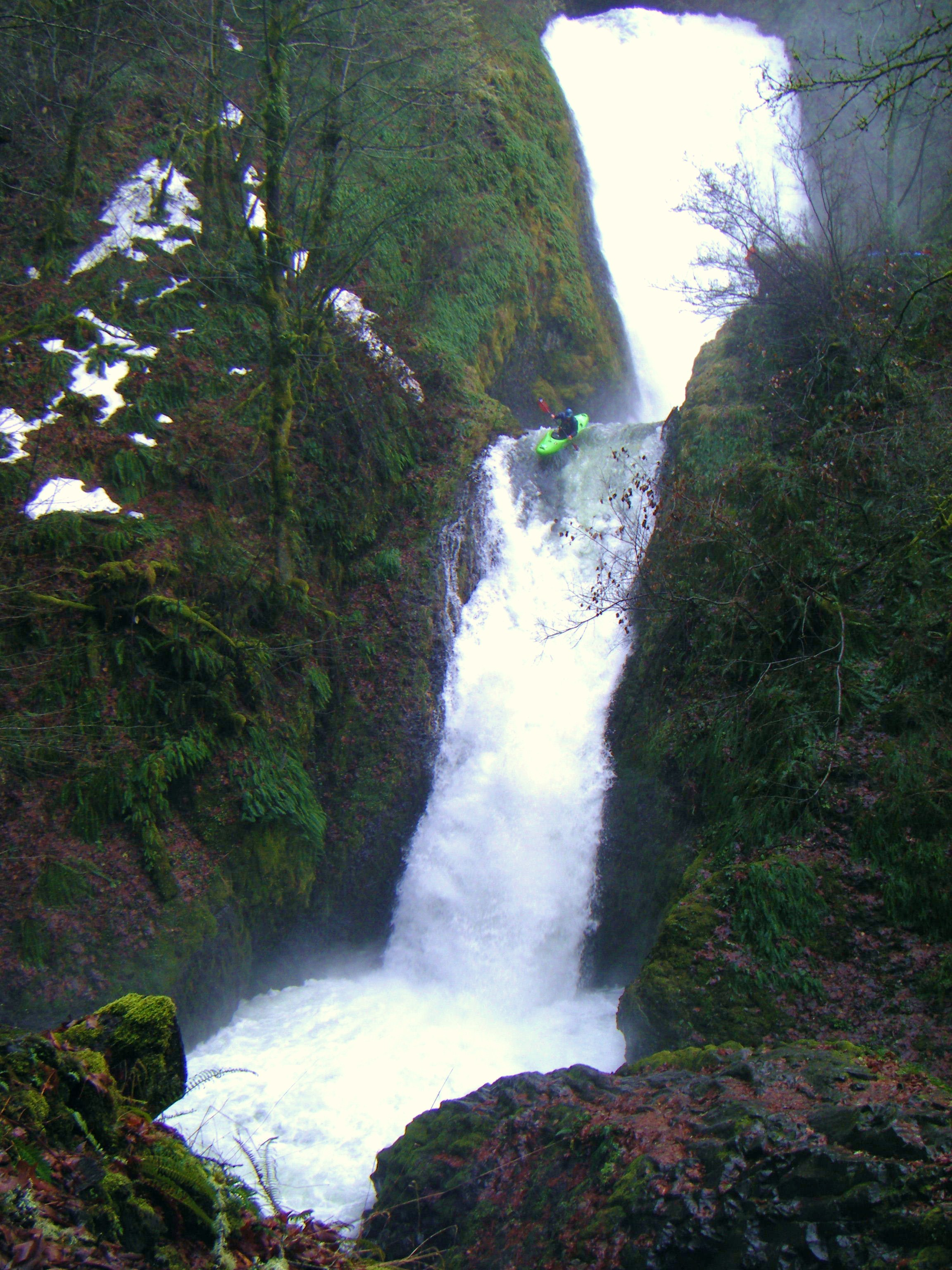
Kayaker heading over Bridal Veil Falls (Oregon) on Bridal Veil Creek in the Columbia Gorge

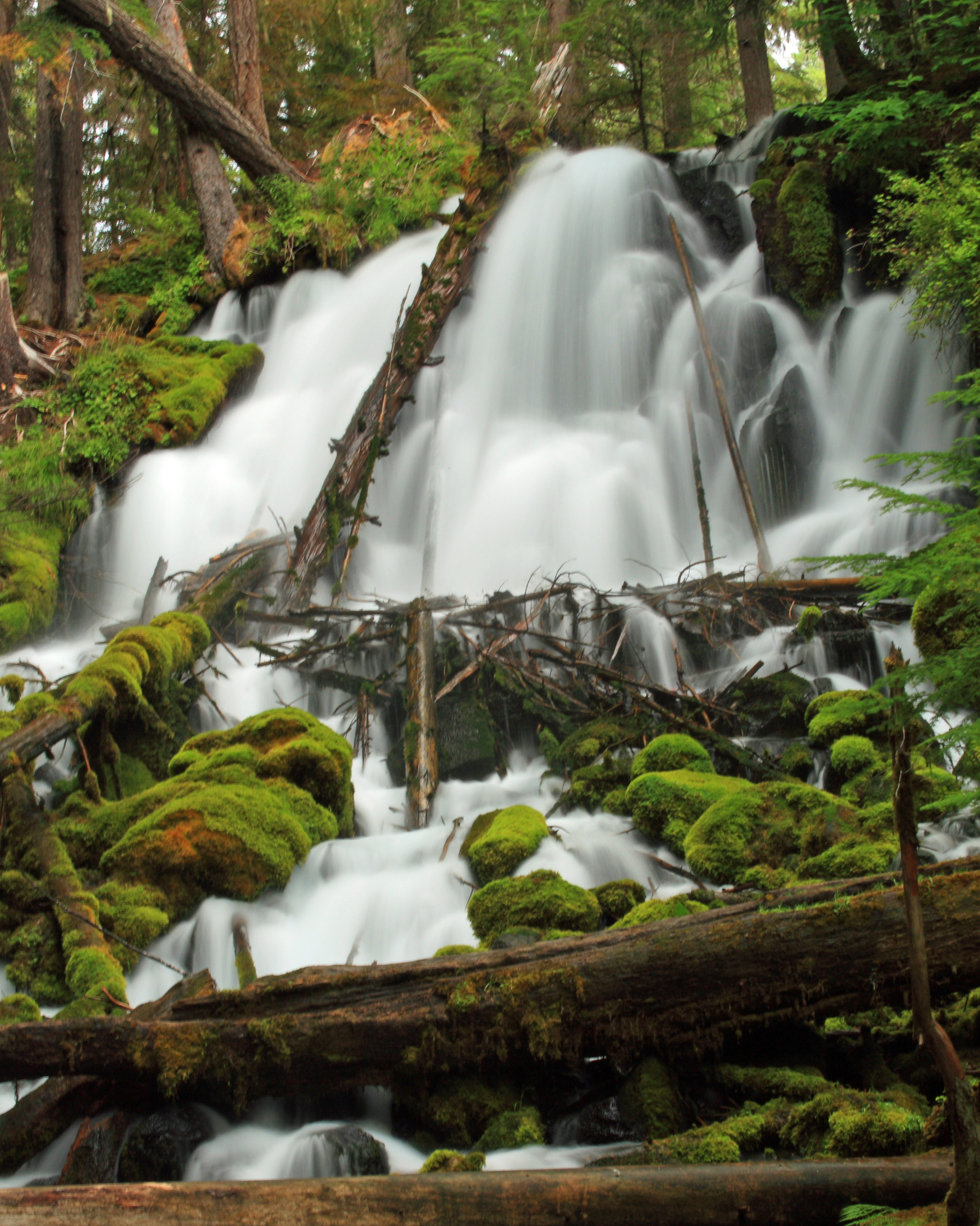
Clearwater Falls on the Clearwater River in Douglas County

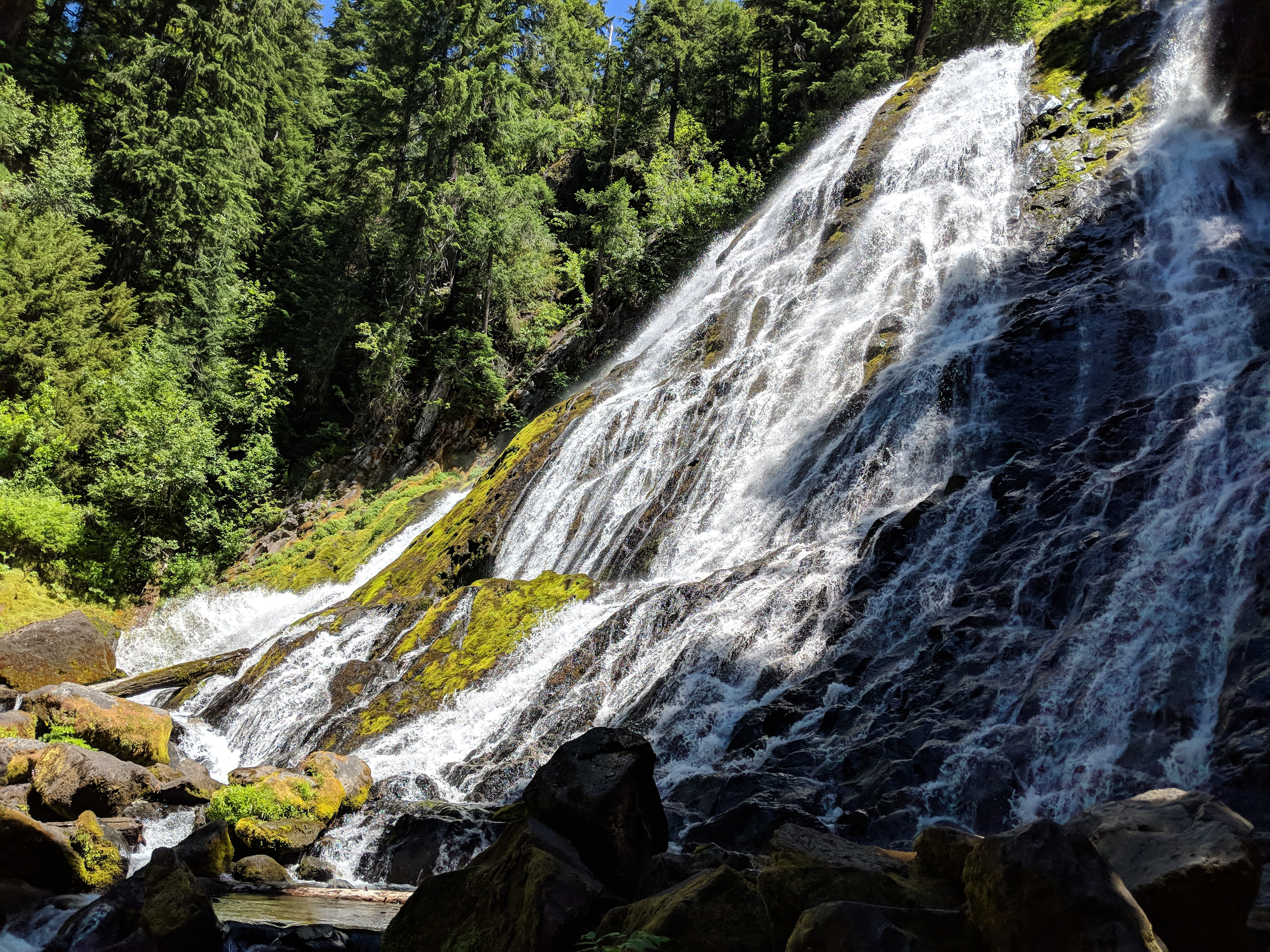
Diamond Creek Falls

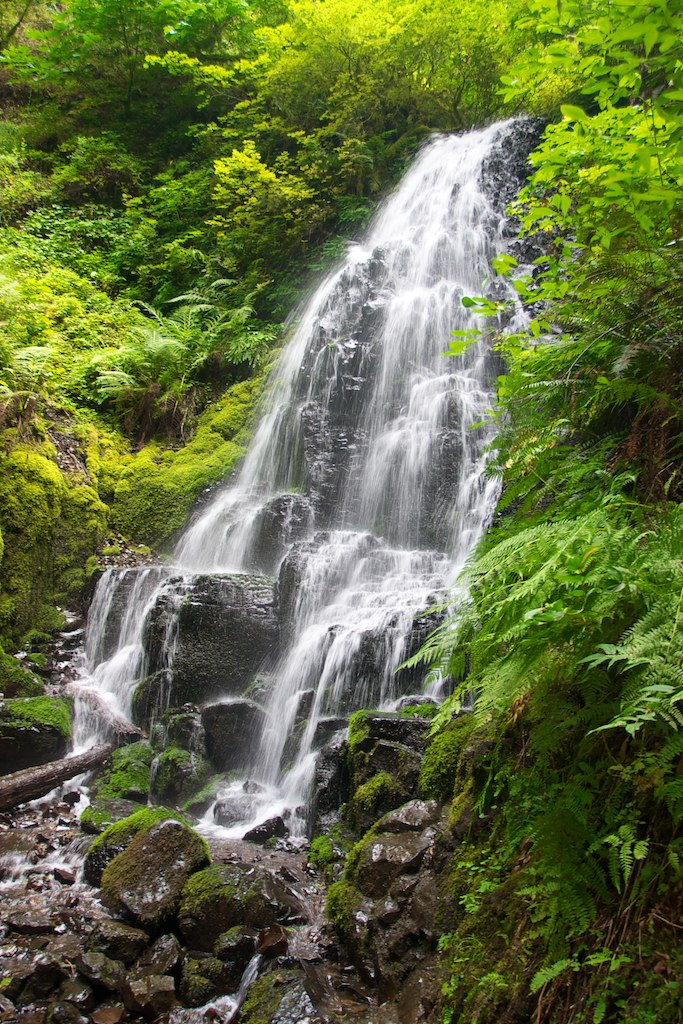
Fairy Falls on Wahkeena Creek in the Columbia River Gorge

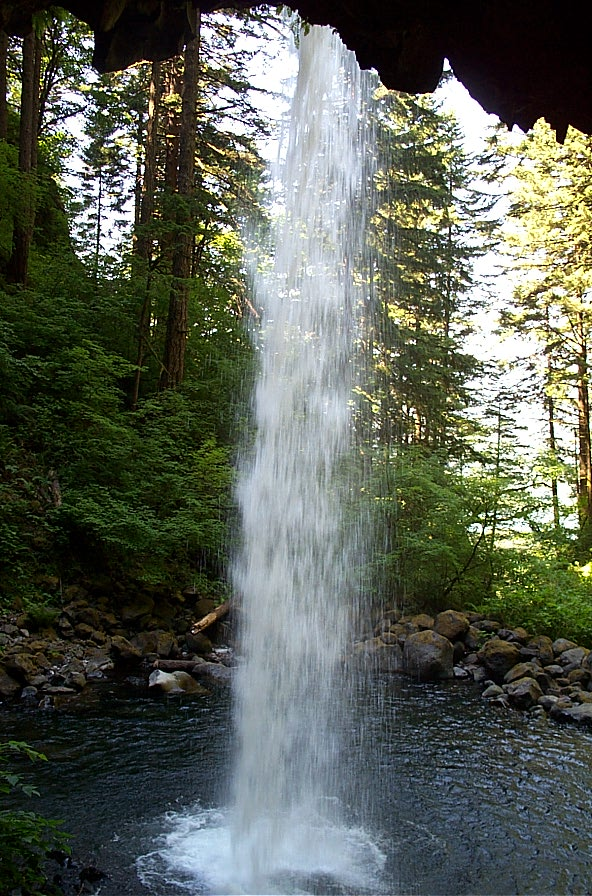
Upper Horsetail Falls, also in the gorge

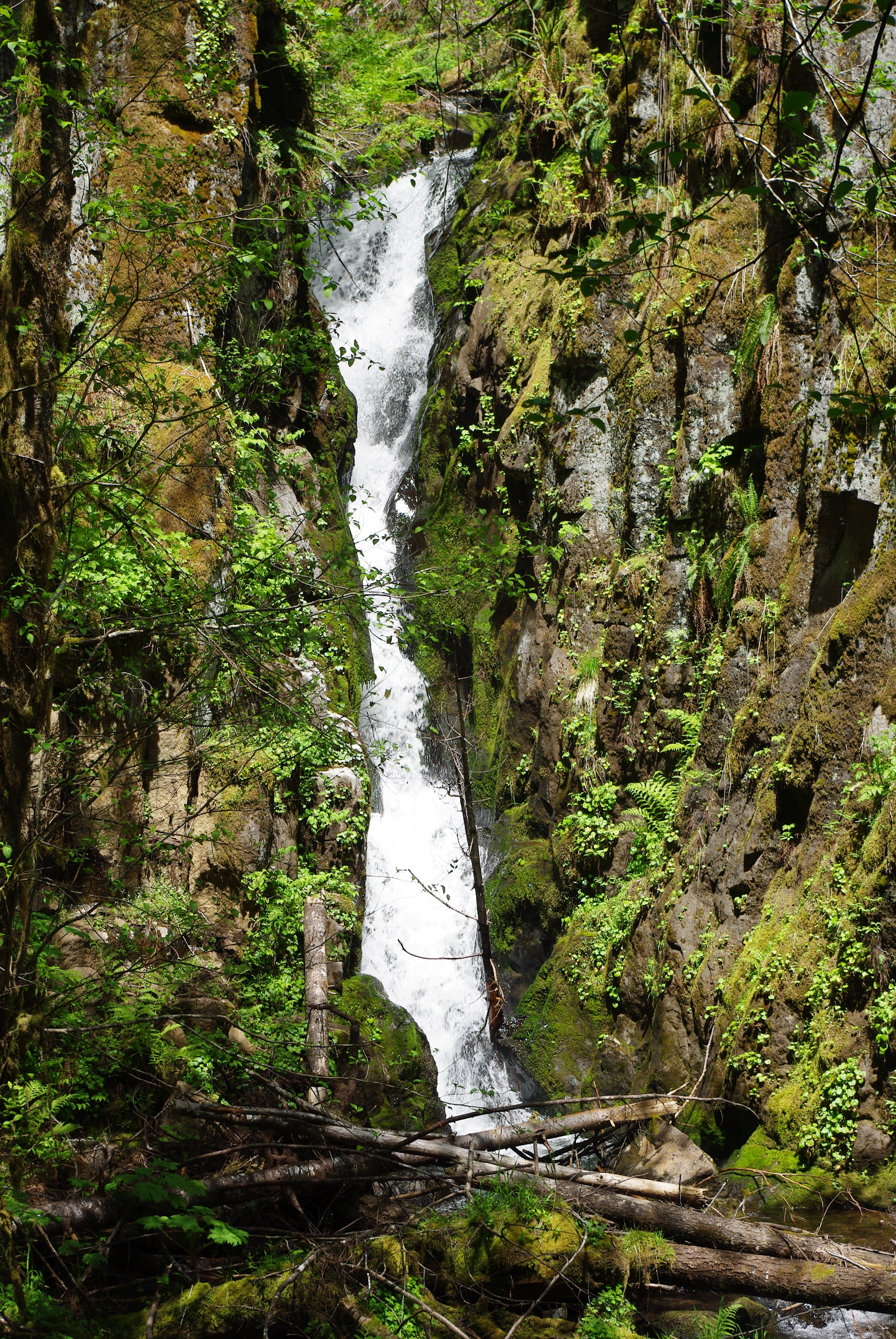
Ki-a-Kuts Falls on the Tualatin River

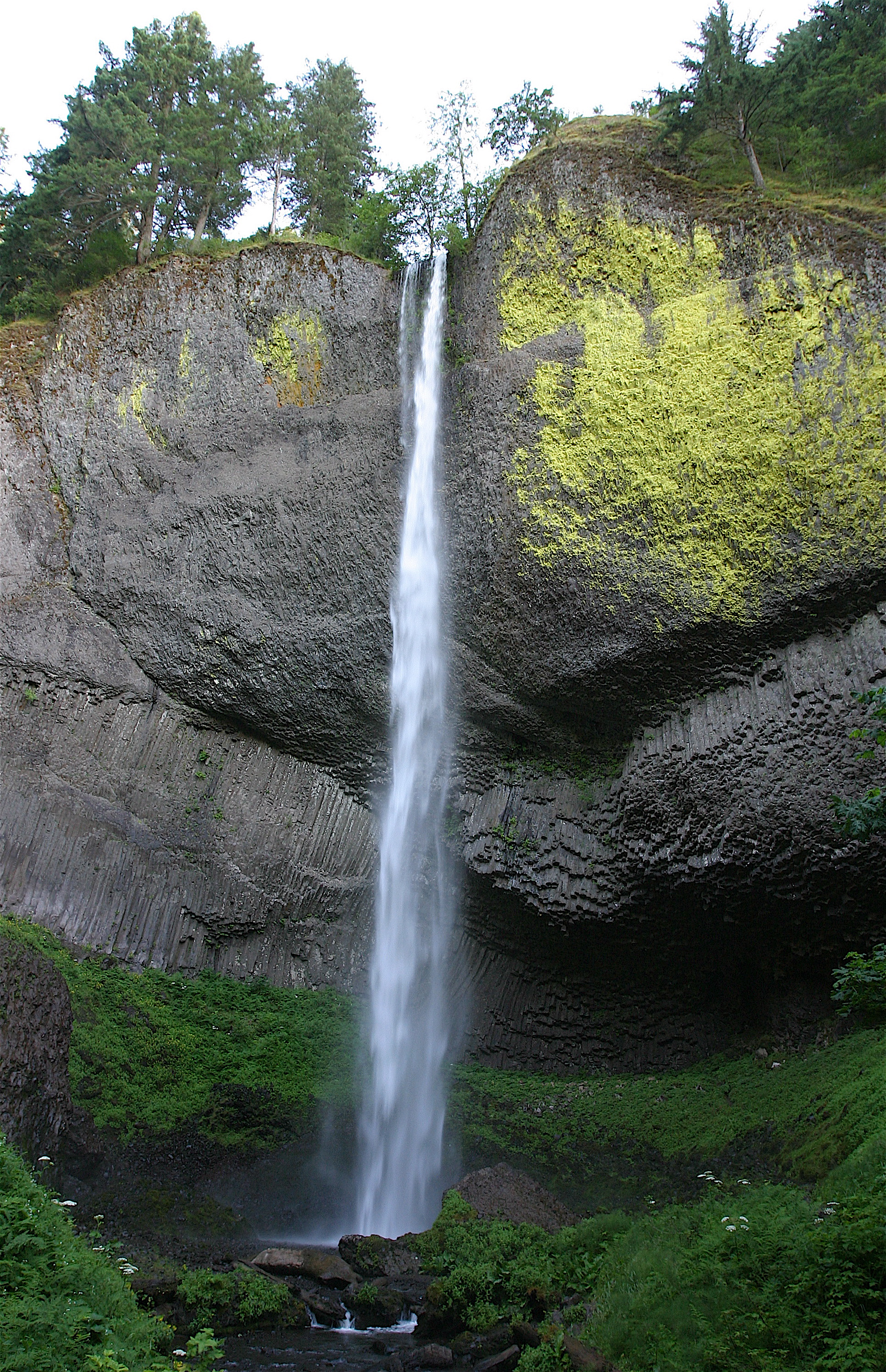
Latourell Falls in the gorge

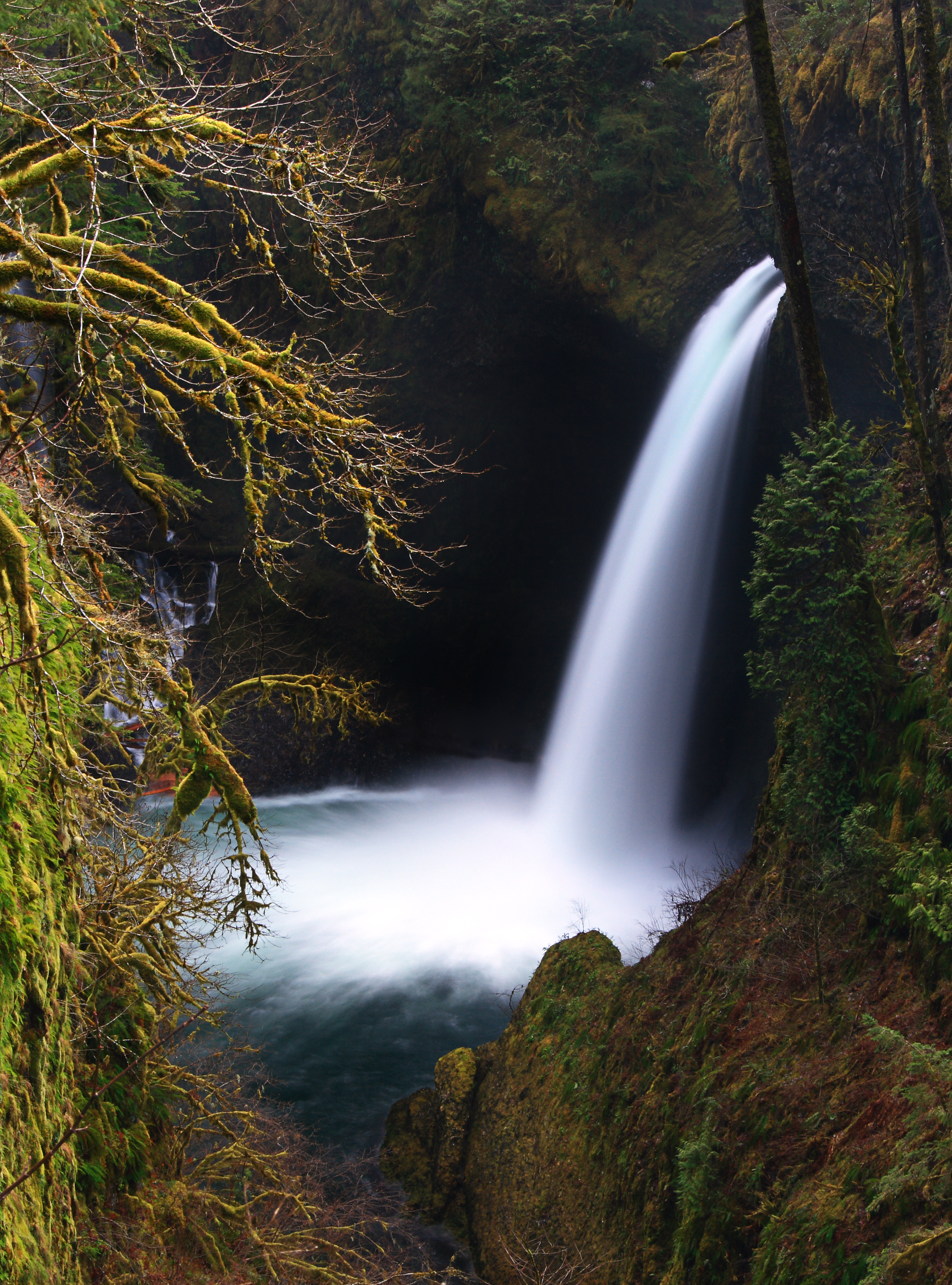
Metlako Falls on Eagle Creek, also in the gorge

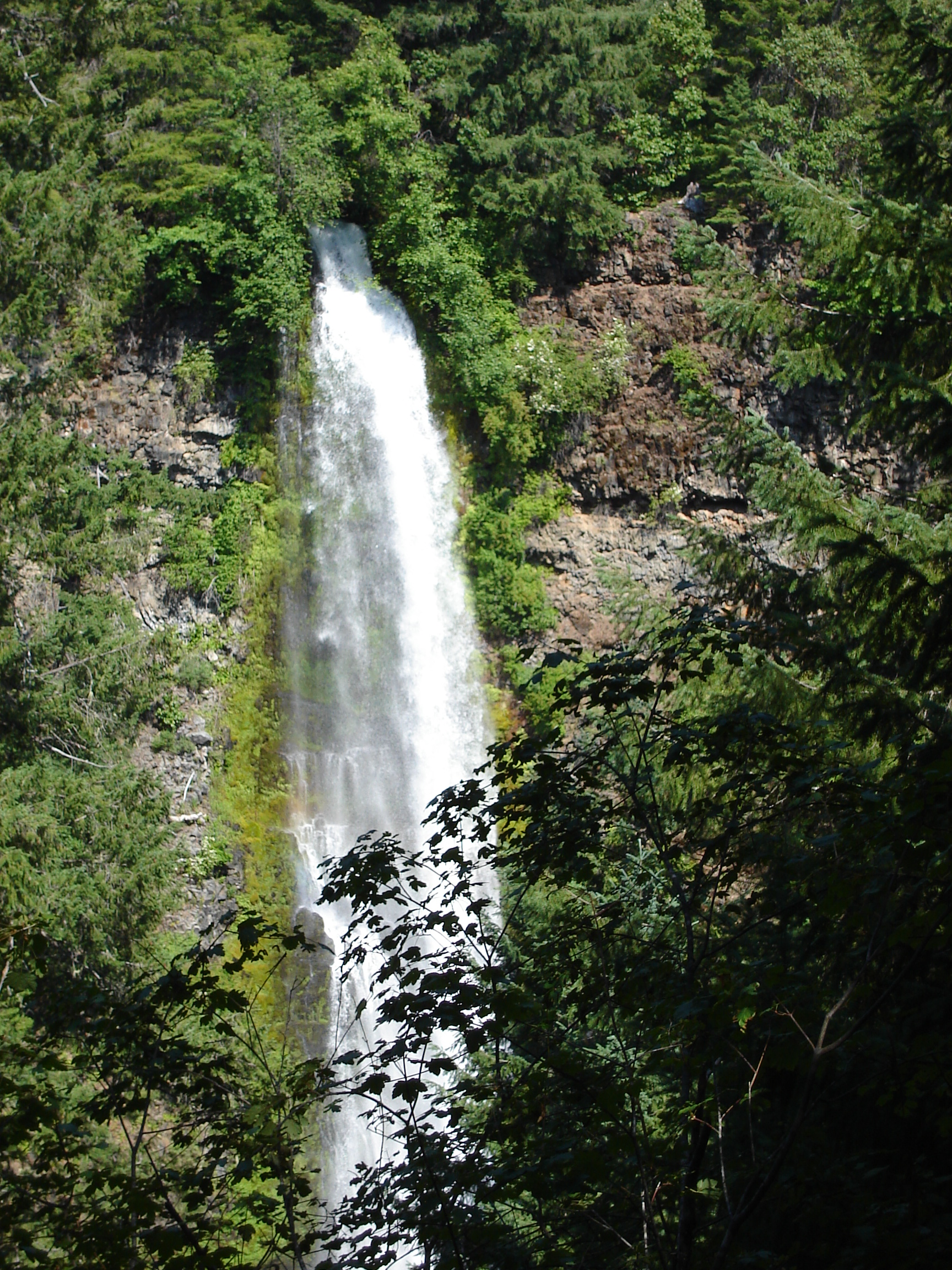
Mill Creek Falls at Prospect State Scenic Viewpoint in southern Oregon

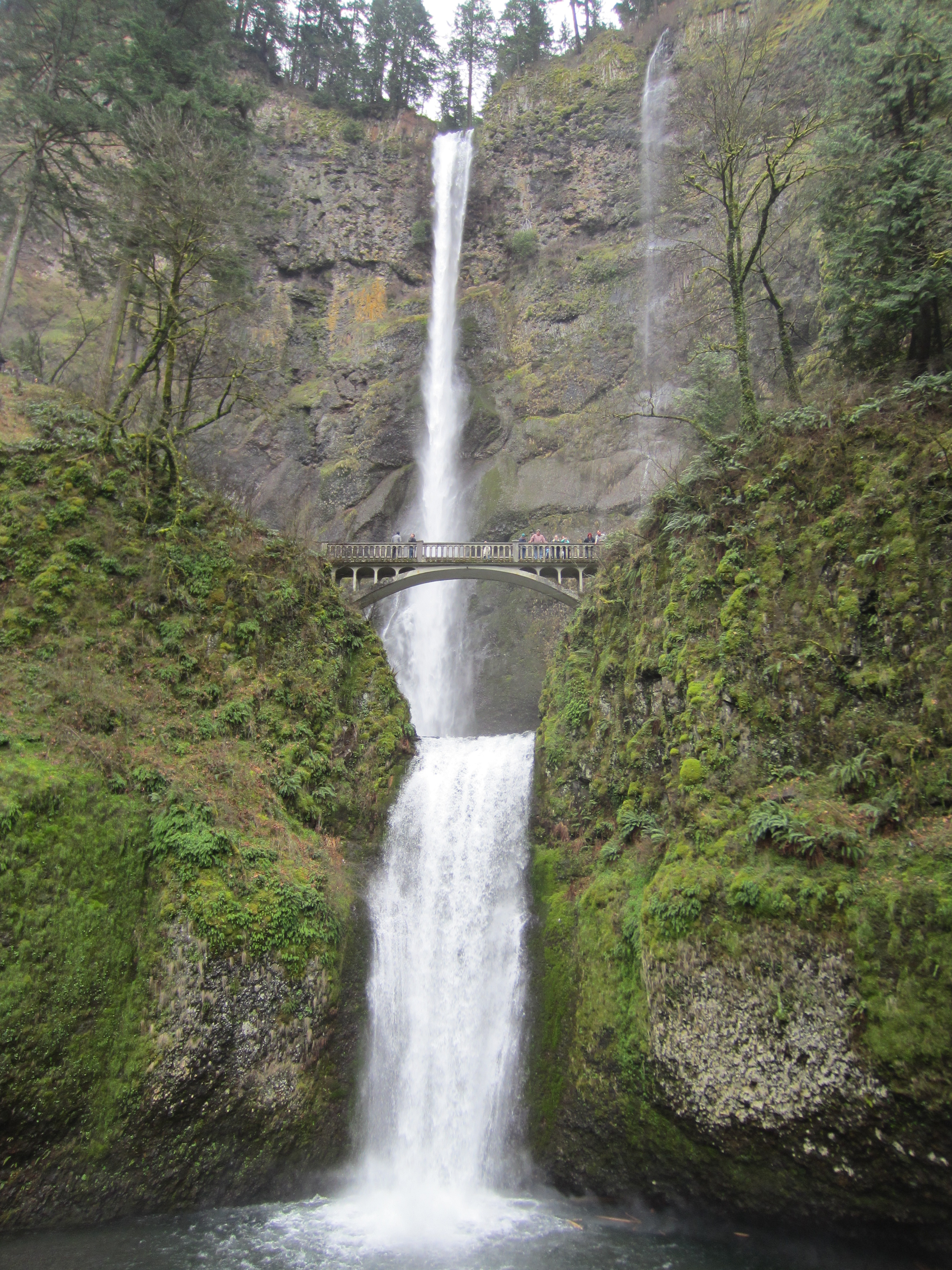
Multnomah Falls in the gorge

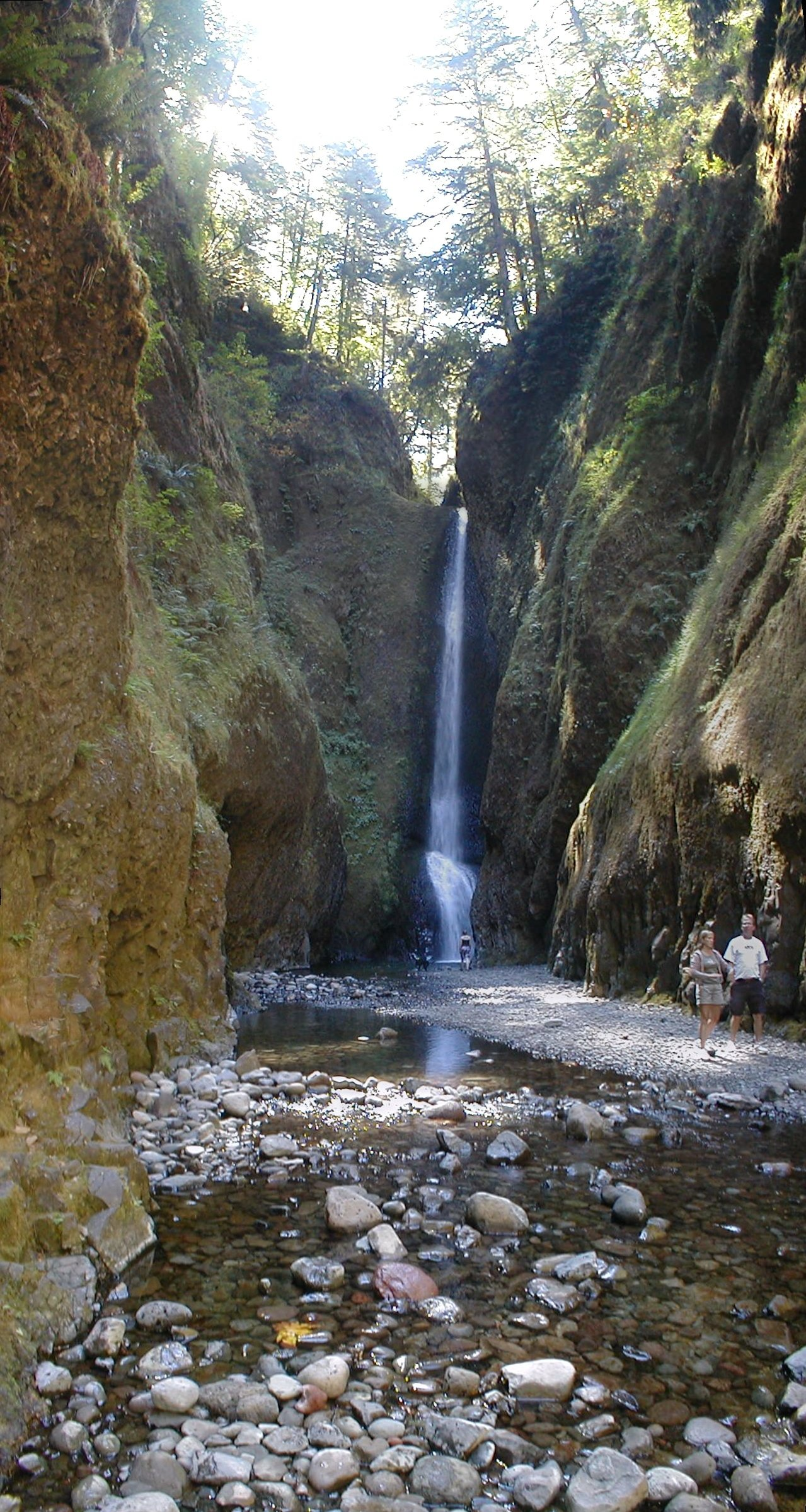
Lower Oneonta Falls in the gorge

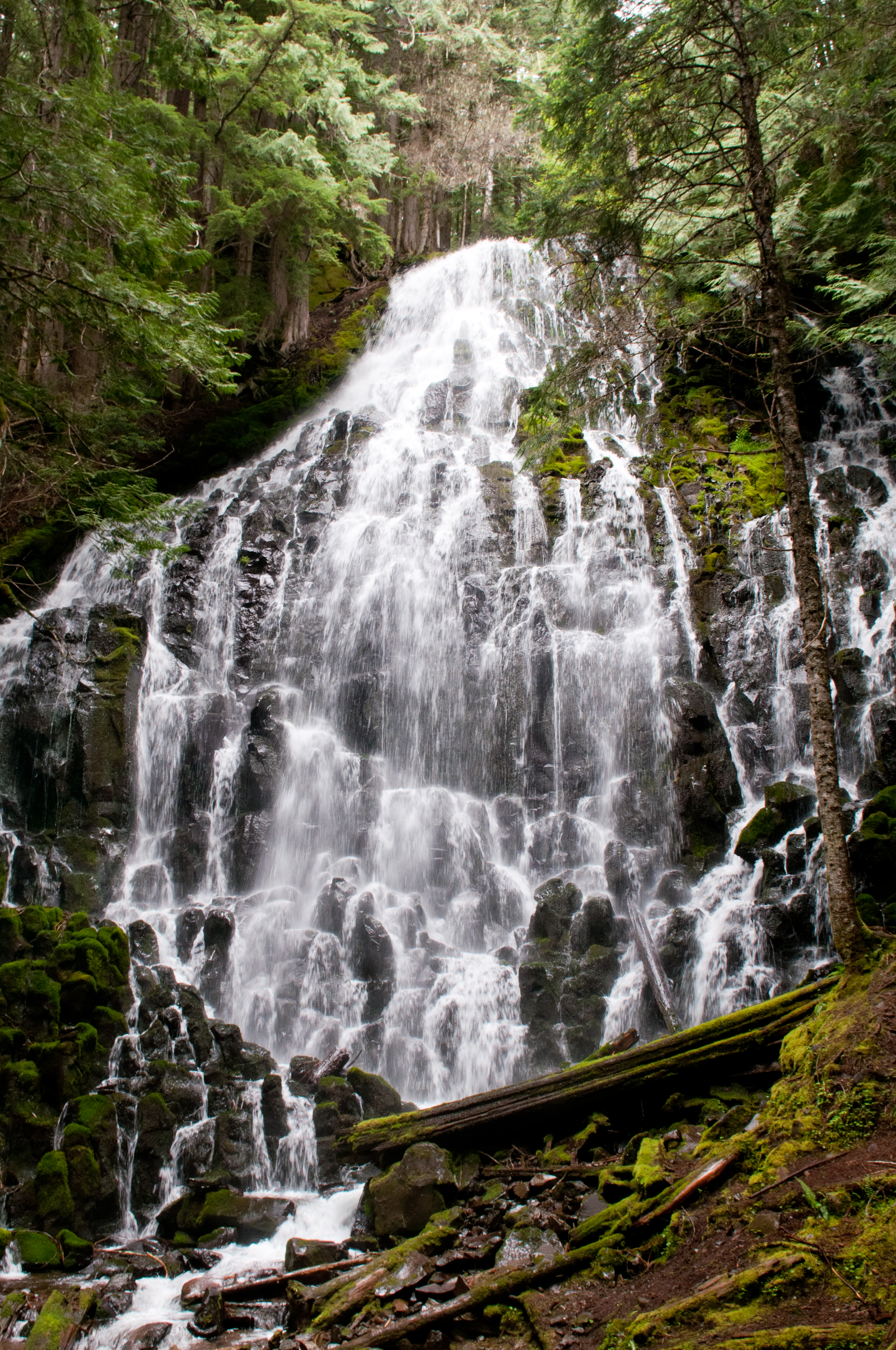
Ramona Falls on the Sandy River west of Mount Hood

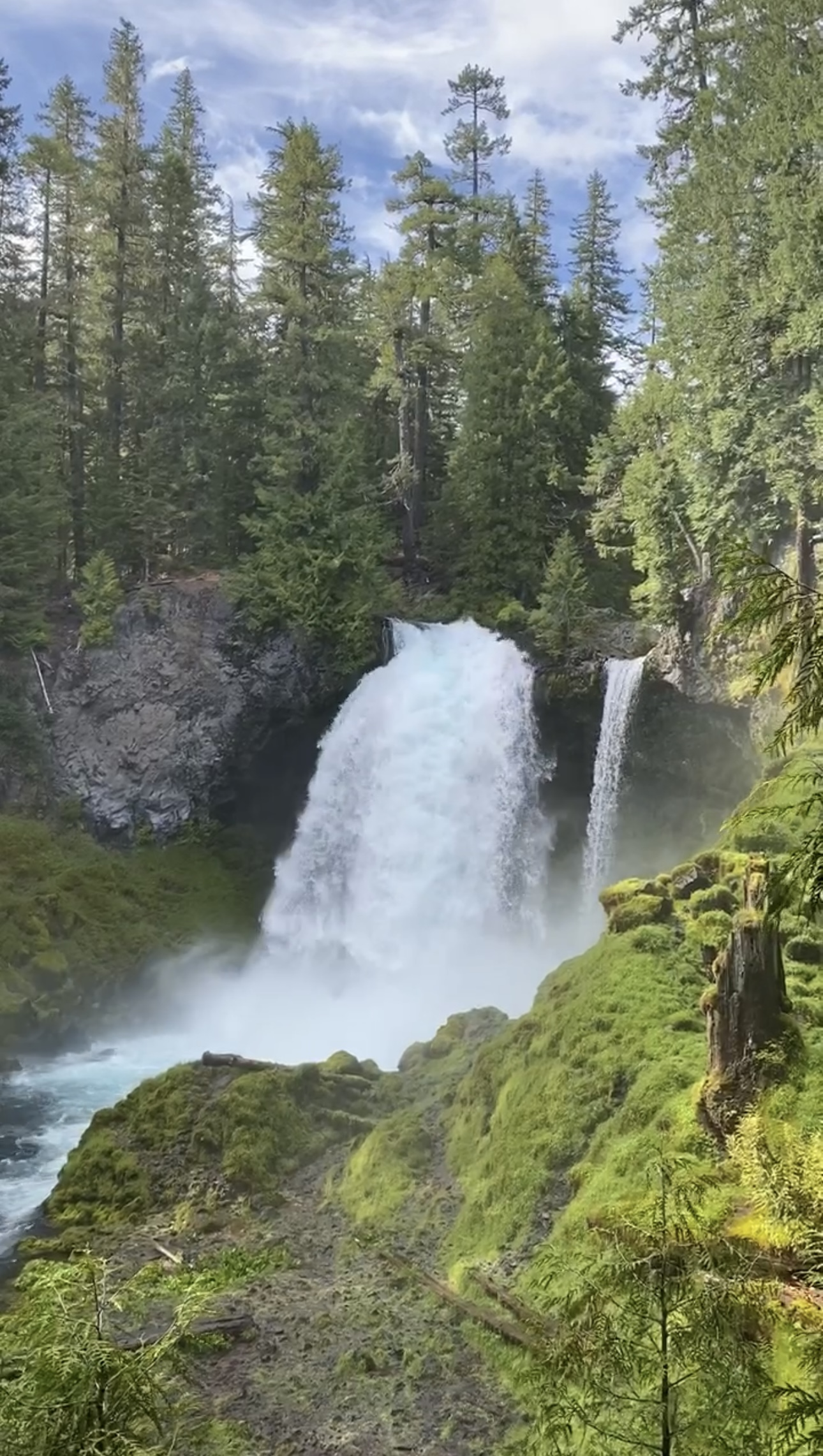
Sahalie Falls near Santiam Pass

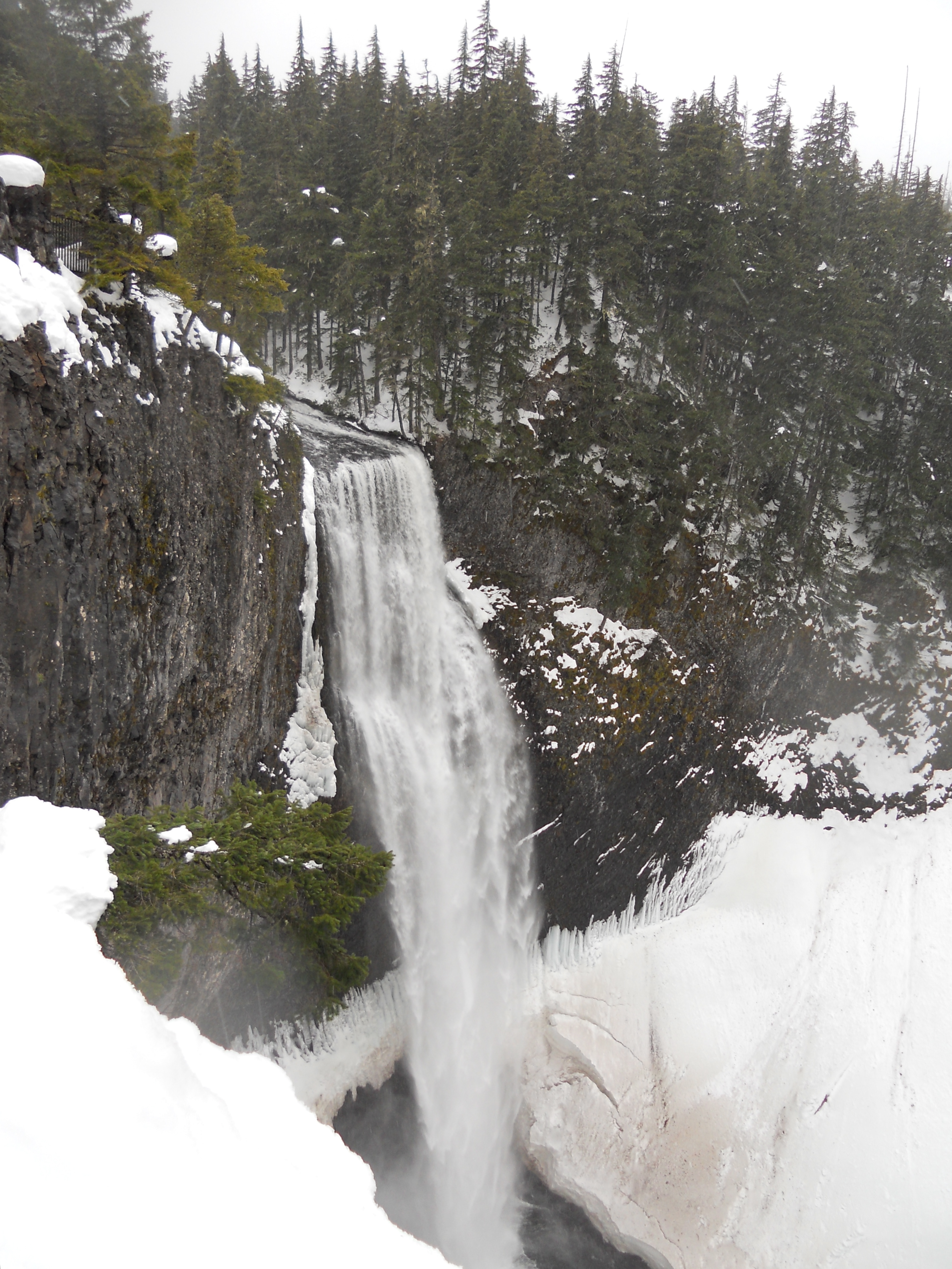
Salt Creek Falls near Willamette Pass

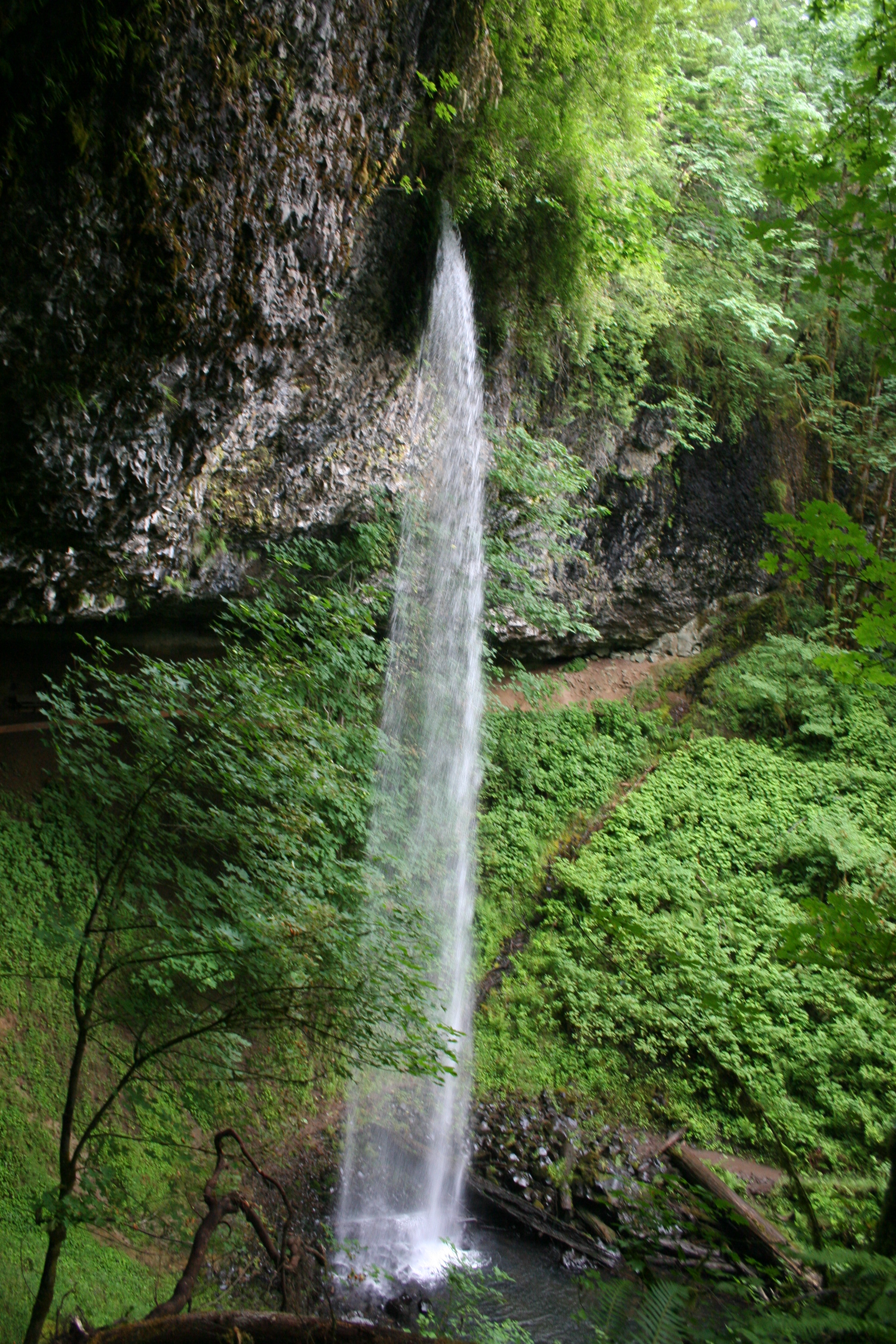
Shellburg Falls in the Santiam State Forest

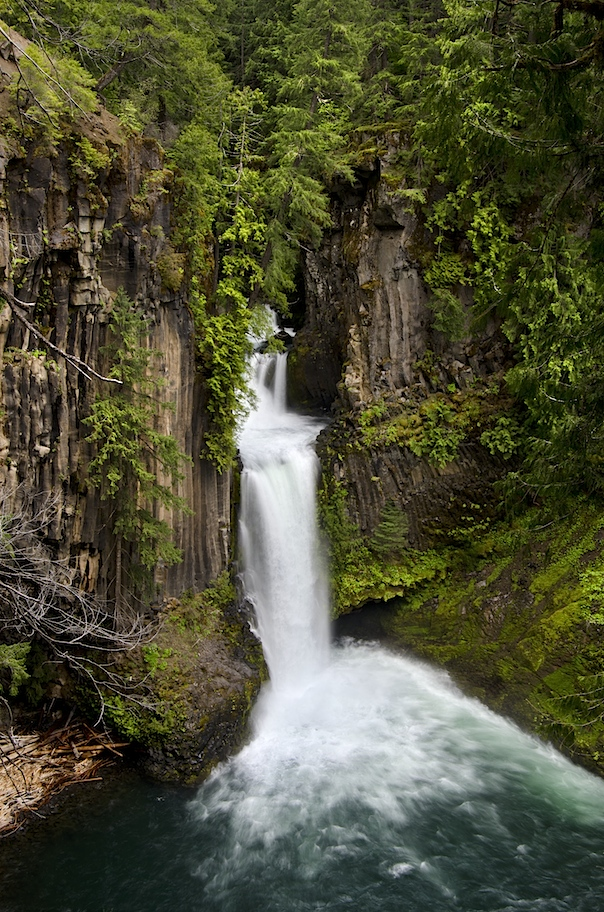
Toketee Falls on the North Umpqua River

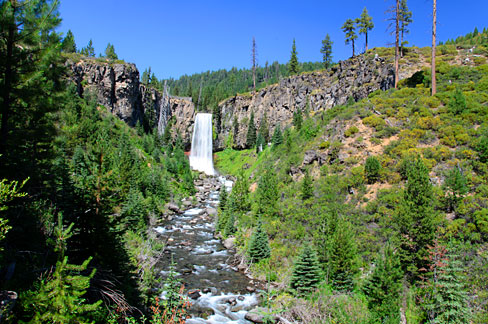
Tumalo Falls in the Deschutes National Forest west of Bend

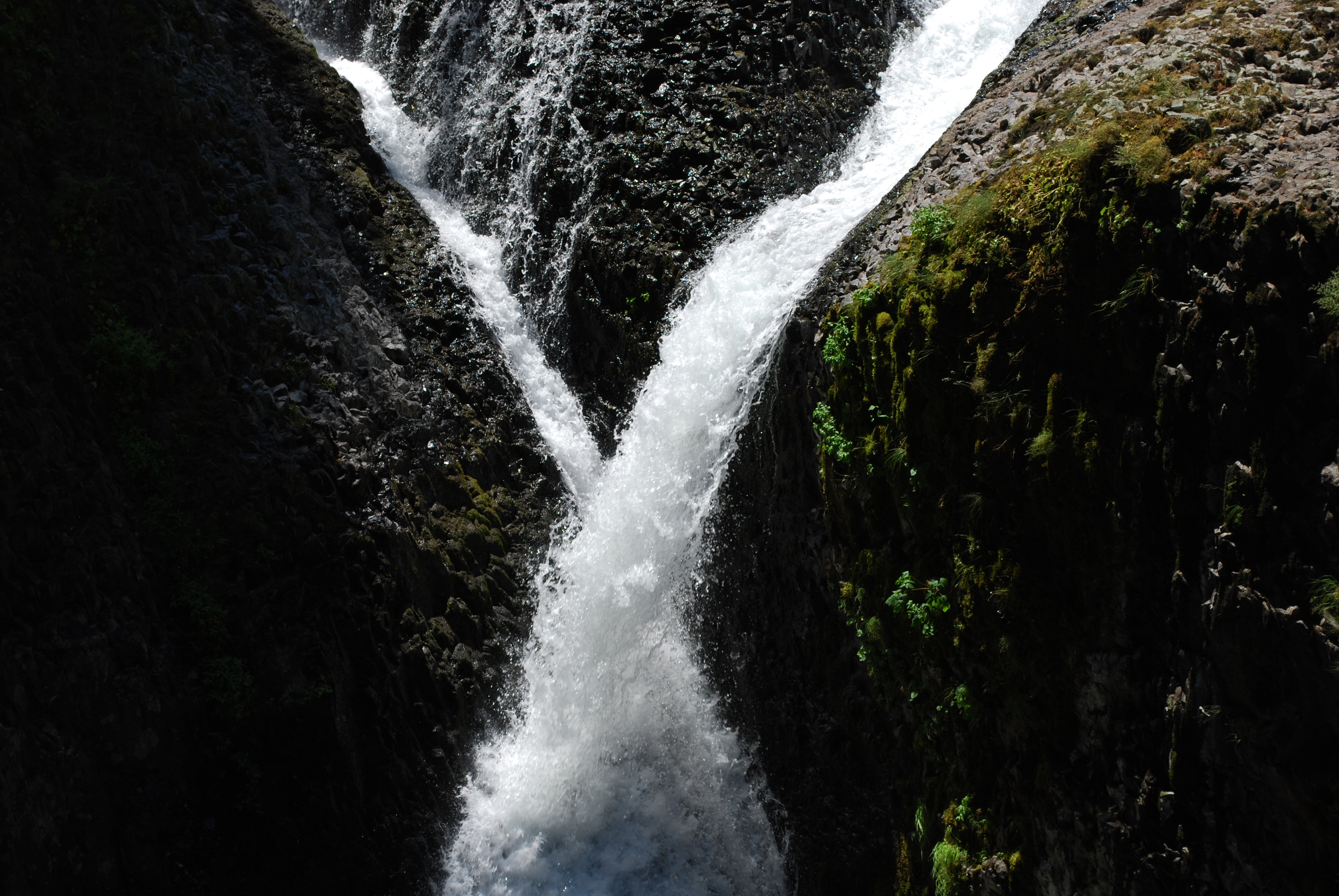
Twister Falls on Eagle Creek in the Columbia River Gorge

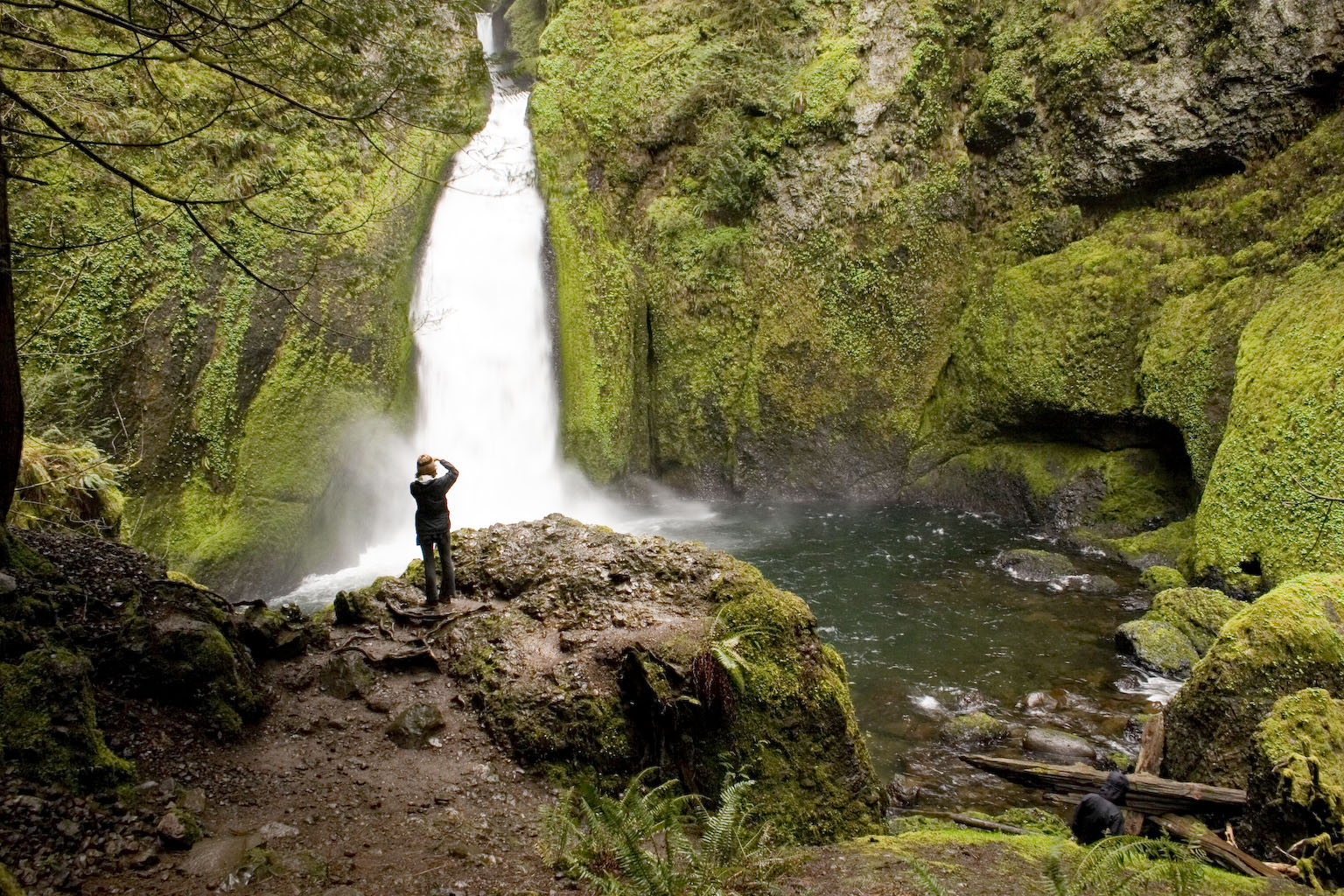
Wahclella Falls in the gorge

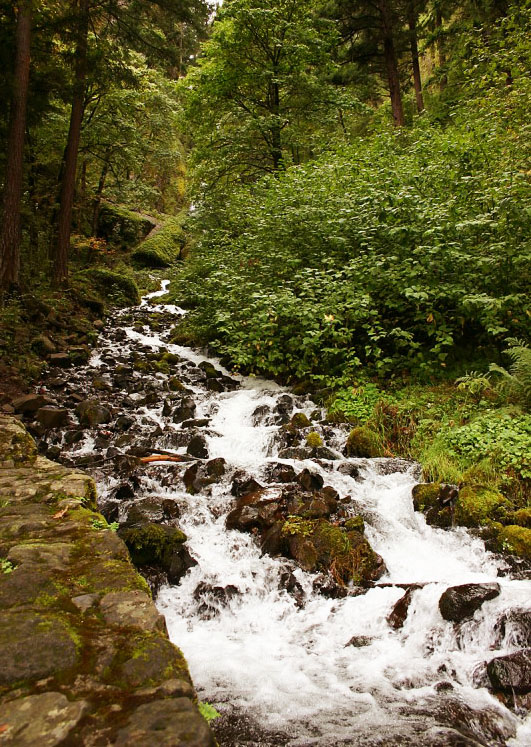
Wahkeena Falls near Multnomah Falls, again in the gorge

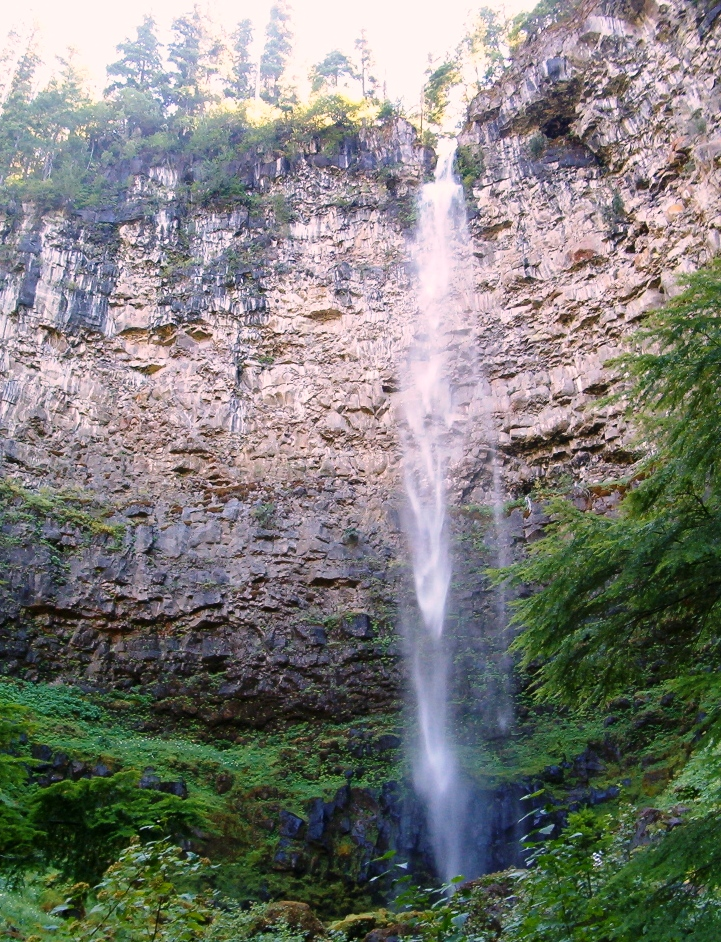
Watson Falls in the North Umpqua drainage in Douglas County

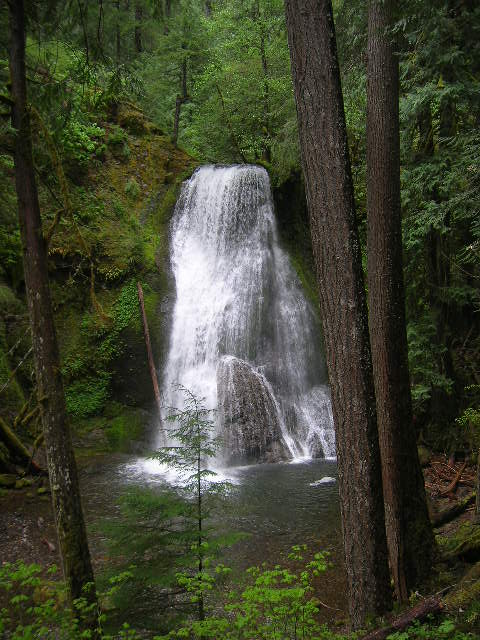
Yakso Falls on the Little River, a tributary of the North Umpqua

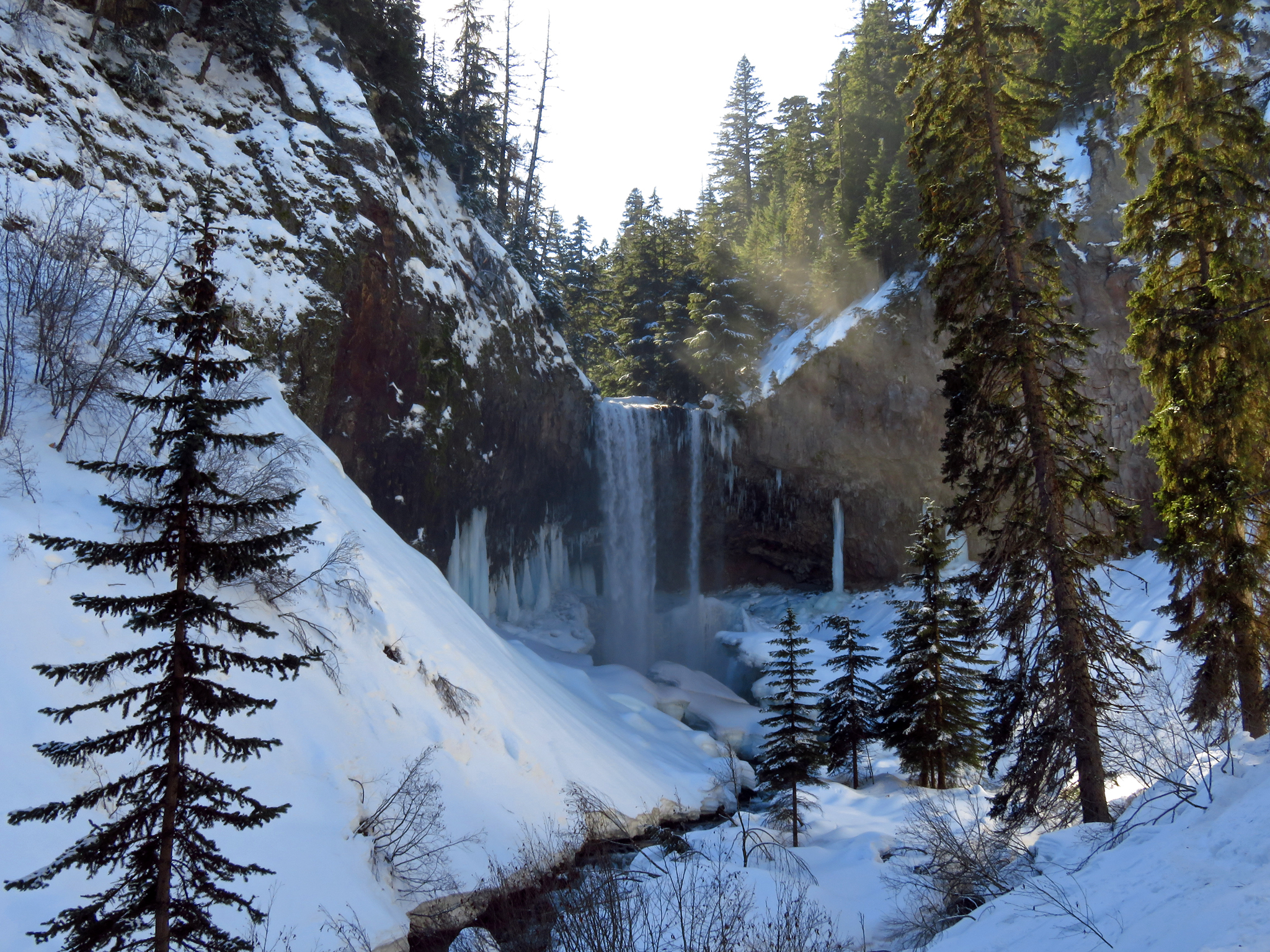
Tamanawas Falls near Mt. Hood

There are at least 238 waterfalls in the U.S. state of Oregon.

name	elevation	coordinate	USGS Map	GNIS ID
Abiqua Falls	1,263 ft (385 m)	44.92639°N 122.56722°W	Elk Prairie	1162805
Alkali Falls	5,200 ft (1,600 m)	43.06417°N 122.36389°W	Rogue–Umpqua Divide Wilderness	
Alsea Falls	732 ft (223 m)	44.32833°N 123.49972°W	Glenbrook	1130736
Annie Falls	5,276 ft (1,608 m)	42.81639°N 122.10944°W	Maklaks Crater	1154266
Awbrey Falls	3,058 ft (932 m)	44.19472°N 121.29444°W	Tumalo	1117103
Ayers Creek Falls	1,444 ft (440 m)	44.81194°N 122.58833°W	Lyons	1131500
Baker Creek Falls	856 ft (261 m)	45.25944°N 123.34556°W	Fairdale	1161003
Barr Creek Falls	2,529 ft (771 m)	42.74611°N 122.49556°W	Prospect South	1157109
Barth Falls	305 ft (93 m)	46.06222°N 123.68722°W	Green Mountain	1117271
Beaver Creek Falls	610 ft (190 m)	43.94222°N 123.89222°W	Goodwin Peak	1135596
Beaver Falls	230 ft (70 m)	46.10361°N 123.12111°W	Delena	1117445
Benham Falls	4,131 ft (1,259 m)	43.93778°N 121.41167°W	Benham Falls	1137918
Berry Creek Falls	1,089 ft (332 m)	44.85639°N 123.47000°W	Falls City	1117554
Big Butte Creek Falls	2,358 ft (719 m)	42.54500°N 122.56194°W	Butte Falls 7 1/2"	
Big Falls	2,480 ft (760 m)	44.37139°N 121.29250°W	Cline Falls	1117620
Bonnie Falls	344 ft (105 m)	45.80417°N 122.93778°W	Chapman	1117932
Boxcar Rapids		45.152984°N 121.108955°W		
Bridal Veil Falls	177 ft (54 m)	45.55444°N 122.18028°W	Bridal Veil	1138603
Bridge Creek Falls	5,285 ft (1,611 m)	44.03028°N 121.58028°W	Tumalo Falls 7 1/2	
Buck Falls	3,504 ft (1,068 m)	45.12444°N 119.64972°W	Chapin Creek	1138785
Butte Creek Falls	1,781 ft (543 m)	44.92333°N 122.51222°W	Elk Prairie	1131493
Butte Falls	2,415 ft (736 m)	42.54583°N 122.56194°W	Butte Falls	1155403
Camp Benson Falls		45.6862°N 121.72823°W		
Campbell Falls	1,407 ft (429 m)	43.05167°N 122.78083°W	Dumont Creek	1139284
Cascade Falls	1,175 ft (358 m)	44.54583°N 122.42861°W	Yellowstone Mountain	1134867
Cascade Falls	213 ft (65 m)	44.31917°N 123.85528°W	Five Rivers	1153579
Cavitt Creek Falls	781 ft (238 m)	43.02056°N 123.20389°W	Dodson Butte	1155250
Celilo Falls	161 ft (49 m)	45.64972°N 120.97889°W	Wishram	1161648
Chichester Falls	1,115 ft (340 m)	43.97028°N 122.53778°W	Saddleblanket Mountain	1139627
Chitwood Falls	686 ft (209 m)	45.07389°N 123.99361°W	Neskowin	1153478
Chocolate Falls	3,215 ft (980 m)	42.02250°N 122.63333°W	Mount Ashland	1156606
Chush Falls	5,007 ft (1,526 m)	44.14972°N 121.68306°W	Trout Creek Butte	2080916
Clearwater Falls	4,242 ft (1,293 m)	43.24861°N 122.22833°W	Diamond Lake	1139811
Cline Falls	2,831 ft (863 m)	44.27667°N 121.25917°W	Cline Falls	1158168
Clover Falls	3,576 ft (1,090 m)	43.20611°N 122.71583°W	Quartz Mountain	2576278
Coopey Falls	417 ft (127 m)	45.56222°N 122.16472°W	Bridal Veil	1140085
Copper Creek Falls	6,017 ft (1,834 m)	45.09444°N 117.38611°W	Bennet Peak	1119271
Coquille River Falls	1,237 ft (377 m)	42.71750°N 124.02139°W	Illahe	1155748
Cushing Falls	121 ft (37 m)	45.61167°N 121.11972°W	Petersburg	1119646
Deep Creek Falls	4,865 ft (1,483 m)	42.17417°N 119.94944°W	Adel	1119797
Deer Lick Falls	2,408 ft (734 m)	43.12750°N 122.58278°W	Twin Lakes Mountain	1140855
Diamond Creek Falls	4,160 ft (1,270 m)	43.60722°N 122.14361°W	Diamond Peak	2676218
Dillon Falls (Deschutes River)	4,003 ft (1,220 m)	43.95750°N 121.41167°W	Benham Falls	1141031
Dillon Falls (Rogue River)	1,093 ft (333 m)	42.45806°N 123.02528°W	Gold Hill	1135718
Double Falls	1,217 ft (371 m)	44.89194°N 122.64500°W	Drake Crossing	1120038
Drake Falls	1,063 ft (324 m)	44.88972°N 122.64583°W	Drake Crossing	1120071
Drift Creek Falls	984 ft (300 m)	44.89889°N 122.70722°W	Drake Crossing	1162950
Duwee Falls	6,001 ft (1,829 m)	42.86639°N 122.15111°W	Union Peak	1154279
Eagle Creek Upper Falls	968 ft (295 m)	45.27750°N 122.19556°W	Cherryville	1154927
East Fork Falls	6,158 ft (1,877 m)	45.04361°N 117.17611°W	Cornucopia	1116548
Echo Falls	98 ft (30 m)	44.88667°N 123.93222°W	Devils Lake	1141662
Elk Creek Falls	499 ft (152 m)	42.81556°N 124.01167°W	China Flat	1134568
Elowah Falls	505 ft (154 m)	45.61167°N 121.99444°W	Tanner Butte	1141845
Emile Falls	2,631 ft (802 m)	43.25167°N 122.83306°W	Mace Mountain	1141867
Estell Falls	112 ft (34 m)	43.47750°N 124.04000°W	Allegany	1132590
Euchre Falls	292 ft (89 m)	44.80056°N 123.86972°W	Euchre Mountain	1153651
Fairy Falls	951 ft (290 m)	45.5705°N 122.1246°W	Bridal Veil	
Fall Creek Falls (Clackamas County, Oregon)	1,942 ft (592 m)	44.96722°N 122.53972°W	Elk Prairie	1120611
Fall Creek Falls (Douglas County, Oregon)	1,361 ft (415 m)	43.31889°N 122.83972°W	Mace Mountain 7 1/2	
Fall Creek Falls (Lane County, Oregon)	4,787 ft (1,459 m)	43.59278°N 122.13833°W	Diamond Peak	1141989
Fall Creek Falls (Lincoln County, Oregon)	180 ft (55 m)	44.39167°N 123.73972°W	Grass Mountain	1153623
Fall River Falls (Deschutes County, Oregon)	4,183 ft (1,275 m)	43.79444°N 121.52778°W	Pistol Butte	1141998
Fern Rock Falls	1,079 ft (329 m)	45.60722°N 123.43722°W	Woods Point	2014047
Final Falls	1,837 ft (560 m)	45.25028°N 121.90389°W	Rhododendron	1158872
Fishhawk Falls	807 ft (246 m)	45.96028°N 123.58611°W	Vinemaple	1120784
Frustration Falls	1,850 ft (560 m)	45.24972°N 121.90278°W	Rhododendron	1158873
Gatch Falls	3,993 ft (1,217 m)	44.56778°N 121.87583°W	Marion Lake	1153028
Glutton Falls	3,527 ft (1,075 m)	45.13583°N 119.68722°W	Hardman	1121174
Gnat Creek Falls	1,522 ft (464 m)	46.11889°N 123.48139°W	Nicolai Mountain	1162749
Golden Falls	574 ft (175 m)	43.48500°N 123.92778°W	Golden Falls	1121219
Gooch Falls	3,015 ft (919 m)	44.57611°N 121.91361°W	Marion Forks	1121074
Grave Creek Falls	636 ft (194 m)	42.64972°N 123.59278°W	Mount Reuben	1159006
Green Peak Falls	755 ft (230 m)	44.33583°N 123.49444°W	Glenbrook	1134167
Grotto Falls	2,956 ft (901 m)	43.24917°N 122.82194°W	Taft Mountain	1154249
Groundhog Falls	4,764 ft (1,452 m)	42.67583°N 117.14694°W	Whitehorse Butte	1121455
Grouse Mountain Falls	4,380 ft (1,340 m)	43.56722°N 122.61556°W	Bearbones Mountain	1143133
Gunaldo Falls	584 ft (178 m)	45.10389°N 123.77389°W	Dolph	1638893
Haines Falls	594 ft (181 m)	45.46556°N 123.32028°W	Turner Creek	1121508
Hemlock Falls	2,825 ft (861 m)	43.21583°N 122.72806°W	Quartz Mountain	1158880
Henline Falls	1,952 ft (595 m)	44.84917°N 122.33944°W	Elkhorn	1162736
Henrys Falls	315 ft (96 m)	43.49694°N 124.00306°W	Allegany	1121762
Hewett Falls (Coos County, Oregon)	843 ft (257 m)	43.45528°N 123.91944°W	Golden Falls	1157232
Hideaway Falls	2,464 ft (751 m)	45.22917°N 121.88194°W	High Rock	1158879
Hole-in-the-Wall Falls	220 ft (67 m)	45.68607°N 121.7018°W		
Honey Creek Falls	3,809 ft (1,161 m)	44.08722°N 121.89444°W	Substitute Point	1131993
Horseshoe Falls (Sherman County, Oregon)	1,470 ft (450 m)	45.38750°N 120.58556°W	Harmony	1122040
Horseshoe Falls (Marion County, Oregon)	1,532 ft (467 m)	44.81028°N 122.58667°W	Lyons	1132445
Horsetail Falls	282 ft (86 m)	45.58944°N 122.06861°W	Multnomah Falls	1143820
Hunter Falls	5,141 ft (1,567 m)	45.33361°N 117.40417°W	North Minam Meadows	1638060
Imnaha Falls	5,220 ft (1,590 m)	45.10722°N 117.10750°W	Deadman Point	1122191
Indian Hole Falls	4,797 ft (1,462 m)	44.09083°N 121.86667°W	South Sister	1154153
Jack Falls	1,247 ft (380 m)	43.31778°N 122.69139°W	Steamboat	1155268
Jackson Falls	407 ft (124 m)	45.62306°N 122.93750°W	Hillsboro	1122359
Kelsey Falls	436 ft (133 m)	42.69750°N 123.77194°W	Kelsey Peak	1158886
Ki-a-Kuts Falls	1,257 ft (383 m)	45.46639°N 123.38778°W	Gobblers Knob	1844264
Kilchis Falls	1,332 ft (406 m)	45.60528°N 123.65111°W	Cedar Butte	1132194
Klamath Falls	4,114 ft (1,254 m)	42.23056°N 121.79944°W	Klamath Falls	1135525
Koosah Falls	2,657 ft (810 m)	44.34389°N 122.00056°W	Clear Lake	1122837
Lancaster Falls	413 ft (126 m)	45.68472°N 121.70583°W	Mount Defiance	1144805
Latourell Falls	367 ft (112 m)	45.53694°N 122.21806°W	Bridal Veil	1144859
Lava Island Falls	3,924 ft (1,196 m)	43.98694°N 121.39722°W	Benham Falls	1144875
Laverne Falls	161 ft (49 m)	43.25667°N 124.02722°W	Daniels Creek	1122998
Lee Falls	387 ft (118 m)	45.46528°N 123.28472°W	Turner Creek	1123020
Lemolo Falls	3,740 ft (1,140 m)	43.34556°N 122.21972°W	Lemolo Lake	1144937
Lillian Falls	3,983 ft (1,214 m)	43.69806°N 122.09194°W	Waldo Lake	1145063
Linton Falls	4,314 ft (1,315 m)	44.15972°N 121.88444°W	Linton Lake	1123114
Little Falls (Clatsop County, Oregon)	299 ft (91 m)	45.79944°N 123.61806°W	Elsie	1123189
Little Falls (Douglas County, Oregon)	1,178 ft (359 m)	43.35528°N 122.71444°W	Steamboat	1145166
Little Illinois River Falls	1,197 ft (365 m)	42.23917°N 123.68000°W	Cave Junction	1155694
Little Lee Falls	308 ft (94 m)	45.45139°N 123.26417°W	Turner Creek	1123223
Little Niagara Falls	2,162 ft (659 m)	45.24194°N 121.88611°W	High Rock	1154255
Little Zigzag Falls		45.3125°N 121.799444°W		
Lookingglass Falls	2,562 ft (781 m)	45.73472°N 117.86417°W	Rondowa	1145456
Loowit Falls	712 ft (217 m)	45.60833°N 121.88556°W	Tanner Butte	1145490
Lost Creek Falls	1,542 ft (470 m)	43.15833°N 123.73250°W	Mount Gurney	1123497
Lower Black Bar Falls	512 ft (156 m)	42.65583°N 123.73111°W	Bunker Creek	1158889
Lower Falls	3,865 ft (1,178 m)	44.19333°N 120.14750°W	Committee Creek	1157534
Lower Falls Little Minam River	3,976 ft (1,212 m)	45.34444°N 117.65111°W	Mount Fanny	1129515
Lower Kentucky Falls	1,017 ft (310 m)	43.93139°N 123.81583°W	Baldy Mountain	2435990
Lower North Falls	1,030 ft (310 m)	44.89167°N 122.64667°W	Drake Crossing	1131478
Lower Parker Falls	2,671 ft (814 m)	43.63583°N 122.60667°W	Holland Point	2576236
Lower Shellburg Falls	1,184 ft (361 m)	44.81028°N 122.60833°W	Lyons	1131499
Lower Soda Falls	1,358 ft (414 m)	44.40778°N 122.47528°W	Cascadia	1145640
Lower South Falls	1,289 ft (393 m)	44.87861°N 122.65833°W	Drake Crossing	1163113
Lower Trestle Creek Falls	2,182 ft (665 m)	43.64722°N 122.65750°W	Rose Hill	2576234
Marion Falls	3,999 ft (1,219 m)	44.56639°N 121.87556°W	Marion Forks	1123761
Martin Falls	164 ft (50 m)	44.67056°N 124.03722°W	Newport North	1132499
McNabb Falls	2,224 ft (678 m)	44.52722°N 122.21944°W	Chimney Peak	1134014
Meadow Brooks Falls	3,271 ft (997 m)	44.96333°N 118.95861°W	Dale	1116596
Metlako Falls	223 ft (68 m)	45.62833°N 121.89889°W	Bonneville Dam	1146115
Middle Creek Falls (Coos County, Oregon)	164 ft (50 m)	43.21500°N 124.01083°W	McKinley	1132609
Middle Falls	682 ft (208 m)	45.29500°N 122.25667°W	Estacada	1160977
Middle North Falls	1,125 ft (343 m)	44.88861°N 122.64306°W	Drake Crossing	1162311
Mill Creek Falls (Wasco County, Oregon)	1,398 ft (426 m)	45.51889°N 121.33778°W	Brown Creek	1124168
Mill Creek Falls	2,365 ft (721 m)	42.74028°N 122.49528°W	Prospect South	1155397
Minam Falls	3,940 ft (1,200 m)	45.31167°N 117.56500°W	Jim White Ridge	1153023
Mist Falls	676 ft (206 m)	45.57389°N 122.13167°W	Bridal Veil	1146368
Moffett Falls	115 ft (35 m)	45.62194°N 121.97389°W	Tanner Butte	1132100
Moon Falls	3,022 ft (921 m)	43.73583°N 122.61111°W	Holland Point	1155385
Moose Creek Falls	1,073 ft (327 m)	44.40389°N 122.44000°W	Cascadia	1153404
Muir Creek Falls	3,966 ft (1,209 m)	43.06639°N 122.34694°W	Hamaker Butte	1156835
Multnomah Falls	348 ft (106 m)	45.57583°N 122.11556°W	Multnomah Falls	1802919
Munson Creek Falls	1,197 ft (365 m)	45.36167°N 123.76083°W	Beaver	1155952
National Creek Falls	3,863 ft (1,177 m)	43.031417°N 122.344667°W	Hamaker Butte 7 1/2"	
Nehalem Falls	79 ft (24 m)	45.72722°N 123.77278°W	Foley Peak	1124639
Nenamusa Falls	758 ft (231 m)	45.24278°N 123.59694°W	Springer Mountain	1153331
North Falls	1,463 ft (446 m)	44.88500°N 122.62389°W	Elk Prairie	1135497
North Fork Falls (Douglas County, Oregon)	965 ft (294 m)	43.93222°N 123.81778°W	Baldy Mountain	1146953
North Fork Falls (Clatsop County, Oregon)	305 ft (93 m)	45.81083°N 123.74972°W	Hamlet	1162745
Obsidian Falls	6,611 ft (2,015 m)	44.16861°N 121.81778°W	North Sister	1116608
Odin Falls	2,671 ft (814 m)	44.32250°N 121.25639°W	Cline Falls	1124938
Oneonta Falls	404 ft (123 m)	45.58250°N 122.07278°W	Multnomah Falls	1147227
Painter Falls	2,575 ft (785 m)	44.55306°N 122.45139°W	Yellowstone Mountain	1952542
Paulina Creek Falls	6,266 ft (1,910 m)	43.71222°N 121.28222°W	Paulina Peak	1147501
Pegleg Falls	2,106 ft (642 m)	44.95889°N 122.15917°W	Bagby Hot Springs	1157880
Pidgeon Falls	95 ft (29 m)	43.47556°N 124.05000°W	Allegany	1125363
Pinard Falls	2,497 ft (761 m)	43.70944°N 122.61528°W	Holland Point	2576238
Plaikni Falls	6,656 ft (2,029 m)	42.909389°N 122.049111°W		
Pringle Falls	4,232 ft (1,290 m)	43.74306°N 121.60833°W	La Pine	1148006
Prospect Falls		42.7378°N 122.4954°W		
Proxy Falls	3,176 ft (968 m)	44.16167°N 121.92778°W	Linton Lake	1125684
Punch Bowl Falls	377 ft (115 m)	45.62167°N 121.89472°W	Tanner Butte	1148046
Punchbowl Falls	833 ft (254 m)	45.60250°N 121.63611°W	Dee	1148047
Rainbow Falls (Lane County, Oregon)	3,012 ft (918 m)	44.13139°N 122.00000°W	Linton Lake	1133215
Rainbow Falls (Linn County, Oregon)	1,463 ft (446 m)	44.37556°N 122.46833°W	Cascadia	1148171
Rainie Falls	591 ft (180 m)	42.65000°N 123.61722°W	Mount Reuben	1125787
Ramona Falls	3,560 ft (1,090 m)	45.38000°N 121.77611°W	Bull Run Lake	1148191
Red Blanket Falls	5,007 ft (1,526 m)	42.79306°N 122.22861°W	Union Peak	1135277
Sahale Falls	4,596 ft (1,401 m)	45.31861°N 121.64028°W	Mount Hood South	1148946
Sahalie Falls	2,854 ft (870 m)	44.34889°N 121.99694°W	Clear Lake	1126447
Salmon Falls (Lane County, Oregon)	1,480 ft (450 m)	43.76139°N 122.37444°W	Huckleberry Mountain	1148979
Salmon Falls (Marion County, Oregon)	1,142 ft (348 m)	44.83167°N 122.36889°W	Elkhorn	1148980
Salt Creek Falls	3,963 ft (1,208 m)	43.61167°N 122.12833°W	Diamond Peak	1149001
Shadow Falls	2,080 ft (630 m)	43.15111°N 122.95111°W	Red Butte	1158937
Shellburg Falls	1,332 ft (406 m)	44.81250°N 122.60861°W	Lyons	1126862
Sherars Falls	686 ft (209 m)	45.26222°N 121.03250°W	Sherars Bridge	1129783
Silver Falls (Coos County, Oregon)	689 ft (210 m)	43.48833°N 123.93444°W	Golden Falls	1126968
Silver Falls (Polk County, Oregon)	2,733 ft (833 m)	44.90306°N 123.58500°W	Laurel Mountain	1126969
Silver Falls (Josephine County, Oregon)	1,818 ft (554 m)	42.47528°N 123.78000°W	York Butte	1149494
Siuslaw Falls	574 ft (175 m)	43.85361°N 123.36444°W	Letz Creek	1127012
Slide Falls	6,808 ft (2,075 m)	44.29694°N 118.66028°W	Strawberry Mountain	1152962
Smith Falls	2,585 ft (788 m)	43.61639°N 122.64278°W	Fairview Peak	1155370
Smith River Falls	171 ft (52 m)	43.78806°N 123.81861°W	Smith River Falls	1149765
South Falls	1,142 ft (348 m)	44.87889°N 122.65889°W	Drake Crossing	1127252
South Fork Falls	3,566 ft (1,087 m)	44.18472°N 119.52472°W	Suplee Butte	1116667
South Umpqua Falls	1,644 ft (501 m)	43.05444°N 122.68639°W	Acker Rock	1150088
Spirit Falls	1,936 ft (590 m)	43.73083°N 122.64167°W	Rose Hill	1155386
Split Falls	2,306 ft (703 m)	45.22944°N 121.87556°W	Wolf Peak	1158934
Squaw Falls	3,645 ft (1,111 m)	45.90222°N 117.66139°W	Elbow Creek	1127492
Stair Creek Falls	515 ft (157 m)	42.69667°N 123.89944°W	Marial	1150322
Stasel Falls	1,335 ft (407 m)	44.80861°N 122.60056°W	Lyons	1127544
Starvation Creek Falls	483 ft (147 m)	45.687000°N 121.688361°W		
Steamboat Falls	1,401 ft (427 m)	43.37361°N 122.64000°W	Steamboat	1150375
Steelhead Falls	2,290 ft (700 m)	44.41639°N 121.28972°W	Steelhead Falls	1150390
Stein Falls	2,638 ft (804 m)	45.22444°N 121.86722°W	Wolf Peak	1158936
Stout Creek Falls	1,699 ft (518 m)	44.81389°N 122.57389°W	Lyons	1131501
Strawberry Falls	6,634 ft (2,022 m)	44.29639°N 118.69333°W	Strawberry Mountain	1150482
Stuart Falls	5,440 ft (1,660 m)	42.79917°N 122.21278°W	Union Peak	1135276
Stulls Falls	443 ft (135 m)	43.51083°N 123.99556°W	Elk Peak	1127675
Sullivan Creek Falls	2,044 ft (623 m)	44.84056°N 122.26556°W	Elkhorn	2559134
Susan Creek Falls	2,159 ft (658 m)	43.33167°N 122.89278°W	Old Fairview	1156872
Sweet Creek Falls	427 ft (130 m)	43.94639°N 123.90306°W	Goodwin Peak	1135595
Switchback Falls	4,478 ft (1,365 m)	45.31417°N 121.66056°W	Mount Hood South	1150794
Tamanawas Falls	3,455 ft (1,053 m)	45.40139°N 121.58917°W	Dog River	1150851
Tamolitch Falls (historical)	2,405 ft (733 m)	44.31167°N 122.02611°W	Tamolitch Falls	1127881
Tanner Creek Falls	433 ft (132 m)	45.61778°N 121.95139°W	Tanner Butte	1154338
Taylor Creek Falls	3,307 ft (1,008 m)	42.46806°N 123.60667°W	Onion Mountain	1159176
The Fall	486 ft (148 m)	45.32361°N 122.30000°W	Estacada	1127965
The Horn	236 ft (72 m)	44.06500°N 123.79000°W	Mapleton	1153682
Thompson Falls	4,117 ft (1,255 m)	45.02083°N 119.19222°W	Thompson Flat	1151102
Ti'lomikh Falls	1,073 ft (327 m)	42.44333°N 123.04306°W	Gold Hill	2652256
Toketee Falls	2,457 ft (749 m)	43.26306°N 122.43139°W	Toketee Falls	1151298
Tumalo Falls	5,072 ft (1,546 m)	44.03389°N 121.56694°W	Tumalo Falls	1151492
Tumwater Falls	318 ft (97 m)	45.65833°N 120.50278°W	Quinton	1160615
Tunnel Falls	1,155 ft (352 m)	45.58500°N 121.85222°W	Wahtum Lake	1151516
Turner Drop	2,976 ft (907 m)	42.86528°N 122.50111°W	Whetstone Point	2497002
Twin Falls	1,243 ft (379 m)	44.88528°N 122.63722°W	Drake Crossing	1128343
Twister Falls		45.582°N 121.852°W		
Umbrella Falls	5,262 ft (1,604 m)	45.32944°N 121.66028°W	Mount Hood South	1151638
University Falls	1,601 ft (488 m)	45.59972°N 123.39389°W	Woods Point	1163316
Upper Black Bar Falls	499 ft (152 m)	42.65194°N 123.72972°W	Bunker Creek	1158947
Upper Butte Creek Falls	1,827 ft (557 m)	44.923083°N 122.51167°W	Tumalo Falls 7 1/2	
Upper Chush Falls	5,630 ft (1,720 m)	44.14306°N 121.68500°W	Trout Creek Butte	1150263
Upper Falls (Crook County, Oregon)	4,121 ft (1,256 m)	44.25500°N 120.10056°W	Keys Creek	1151675
Upper Falls Deschutes River	3,950 ft (1,200 m)	43.97861°N 121.40833°W	Benham Falls	1153030
Upper Kentucky Falls	1,444 ft (440 m)	43.92806°N 123.80250°W	Baldy Mountain	2435969
Upper Latourell Falls	679 ft (207 m)	45.53028°N 122.22111°W	Bridal Veil	1134666
Upper North Falls	1,562 ft (476 m)	44.88306°N 122.62333°W	Elk Prairie	1163596
Upper Parker Falls	2,756 ft (840 m)	43.63750°N 122.60389°W	Holland Point	2576237
Upper Soda Falls	1,857 ft (566 m)	44.41472°N 122.47167°W	Cascadia	1151706
Upper Trestle Creek Falls	2,585 ft (788 m)	43.65139°N 122.65139°W	Rose Hill	2576235
Valsetz Falls	738 ft (225 m)	44.86222°N 123.73389°W	Valsetz	1132250
Vanishing Falls	2,096 ft (639 m)	45.24361°N 121.89417°W	High Rock	1158948
Wah Gwin Gwin Falls	292 ft (89 m)	45.71194°N 121.55361°W	Hood River	1157080
Wahclella Falls	308 ft (94 m)	45.61806°N 121.95139°W	Tanner Butte	1851757
Wahe Falls	548 ft (167 m)	45.61583°N 121.96528°W	Tanner Butte	1151807
Wahkeena Falls	574 ft (175 m)	45.57361°N 122.12694°W	Bridal Veil	1151809
Wallalute Falls	4,879 ft (1,487 m)	45.41139°N 121.65639°W	Mount Hood North	1151854
Wallowa Falls	4,662 ft (1,421 m)	45.26778°N 117.21611°W	Joseph	1158571
Warren Creek Falls	190 ft (58 m)	45.68639°N 121.70194°W	Mount Defiance	1153233
Watson Falls	3,353 ft (1,022 m)	43.24139°N 122.39000°W	Fish Creek Desert	1151968
Whitehorse Falls	3,661 ft (1,116 m)	43.24750°N 122.30472°W	Garwood Butte	1134229
Wiesendanger Falls	1,066 ft (325 m)	45.57333°N 122.10778°W	Multnomah Falls	1765041
Wildwood Falls	1,004 ft (306 m)	43.69972°N 122.81889°W	Culp Creek	1135735
Willamette Falls	59 ft (18 m)	45.35111°N 122.62194°W	Oregon City	1156769
Wilson Falls	469 ft (143 m)	45.57056°N 123.57056°W	Jordan Creek	1132207
Winter Falls	1,365 ft (416 m)	44.88444°N 122.64083°W	Drake Crossing	1129244
Wizard Falls	2,762 ft (842 m)	44.51861°N 121.63222°W	Candle Creek	1152565
Wolf Creek Falls	1,936 ft (590 m)	43.21917°N 122.93028°W	Red Butte	1155229
Wolf Hollow Falls	1,608 ft (490 m)	45.37889°N 120.07583°W	Wolf Hollow Falls	1129283
Wy'east Falls		45.5927°N 121.8644°W		
Yakso Falls	3,133 ft (955 m)	43.22472°N 122.73250°W	Quartz Mountain	1158952
Yocum Falls	3,353 ft (1,022 m)	45.30694°N 121.79306°W	Government Camp	1152735
Youngs River Falls	85 ft (26 m)	46.06694°N 123.78972°W	Olney	1129400

== See also ==
- List of waterfalls
- Lists of Oregon-related topics
