= Campbell Falls (Oregon) =

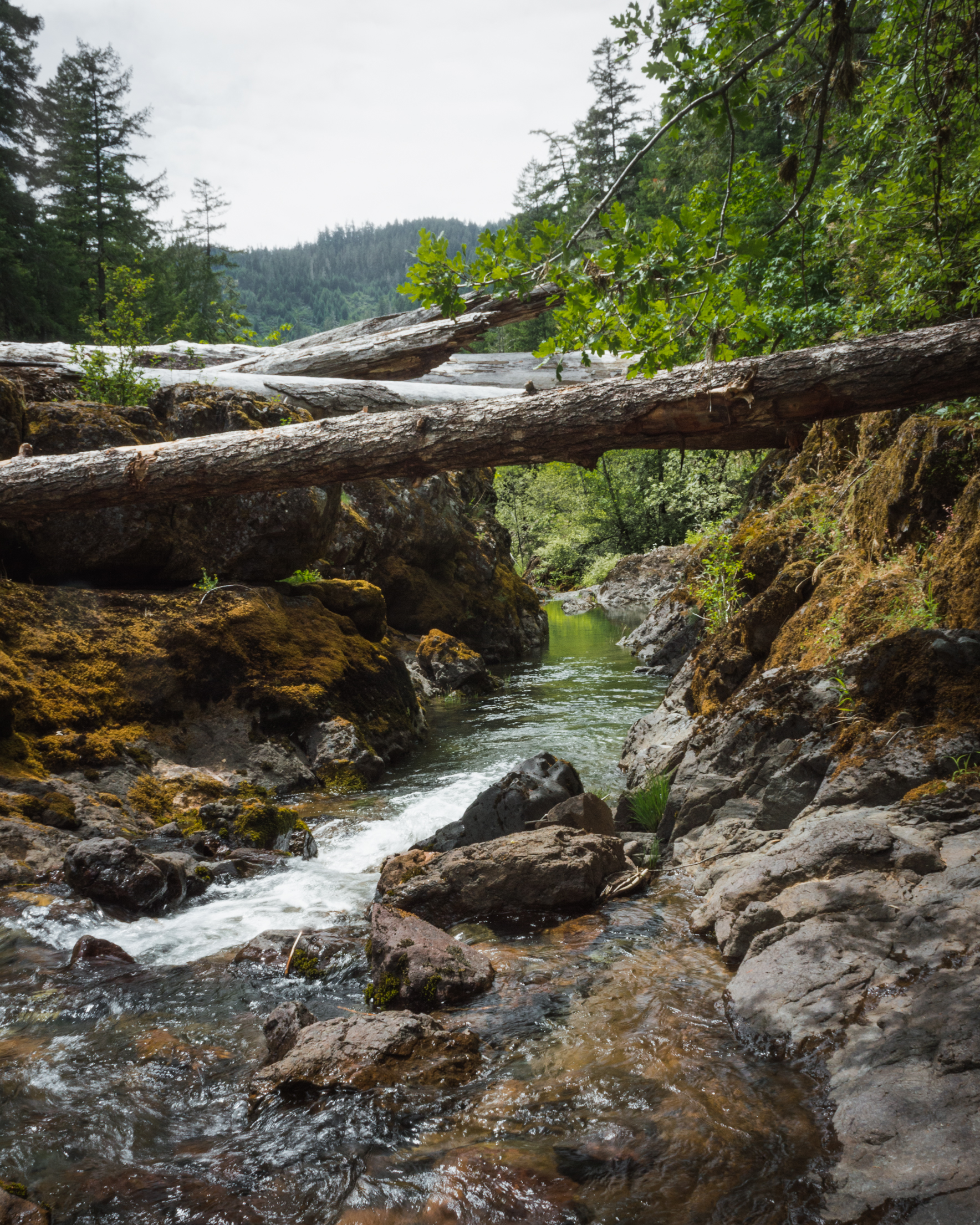
- Interactive map of Campbell Falls
- Location: Umpqua National Forest
- Coordinates: 43.0523°N 122.77073°W
- Elevation: 1,425 ft (434 m)
- Total height: Unrated

Campbell Falls is a waterfall from the South Fork of the Umpqua River east of Canyonville, Oregon, some 12 miles upstream from Tiller, which is 25 miles east of Interstate 5 between Roseburg and Grants Pass. The waterfall is known for being the start point for river rafting the South Umpqua River and is the centerpiece attraction of the Boulder Creek Campground.

== History ==
The waterfall was named in 1949 after Robert G Campbell, killed in action in 1944 while allowing his crew to escape enemy fire. Prior to enlisting, Campbell Campbell served as Assistant Ranger for the forest region that surrounds the waterfall. A commemorative bronze plaque was placed on a large bolder in the center of an island along the middle of the South Umpqua River.

== See also ==
- List of waterfalls in Oregon
