= Camp Benson Falls =

Waterfall in Oregon, United States

Coordinates: 45.6862°N 121.72823°W

Camp Benson Falls is a 90-foot waterfall on Summit Creek in Lindsey Creek State Park, Hood River County, Oregon, United States. Its elevation is 369 feet (112 m).

Summit Creek is a tributary of the Columbia River and enters it about 11 miles (18 km) west of the city of Hood River. The falls are located about 600 metres (2,000 ft) from the terminus of Summit Creek.

== See also ==
- List of waterfalls
- List of waterfalls in Oregon
