= Barth Falls =

- Interactive map of Barth Falls
- Coordinates: 46.06305°N 123.6826°W
- Type: Plunge
- Elevation: 349 ft (106 m)
- Total height: 8 ft (2.4 m)
- Average flow rate: 75 cu ft/s (2.1 m^{3}/s)

Barth Falls, is a small waterfall located along the North Fork Klaskanine River in Clatsop County, Oregon. The waterfall is known for a three-step fish ladder that bypasses the waterfall to assist fish navigate the waterfall.

== Location ==
Barth Falls is located off of Highway 202 between Jewell and Astoria.

== See also ==
- List of waterfalls in Oregon
