= Deer Lick Falls (Oregon) =

- Interactive map of Deer Lick Falls
- Location: Umpqua National Forest
- Coordinates: 43.1275°N 122.58389°W
- Elevation: 2,279 ft (695 m)
- Total height: Unrated

Deer Lick Falls is a small waterfall from the Black Rock fork of the South Umpqua River in Douglas County, Oregon. Access to Deer Lick Falls is from Forest Road 28, approximately 4 miles northeast of South Umpqua Falls.

== See also ==
- List of waterfalls in Oregon
