= National Creek Falls =

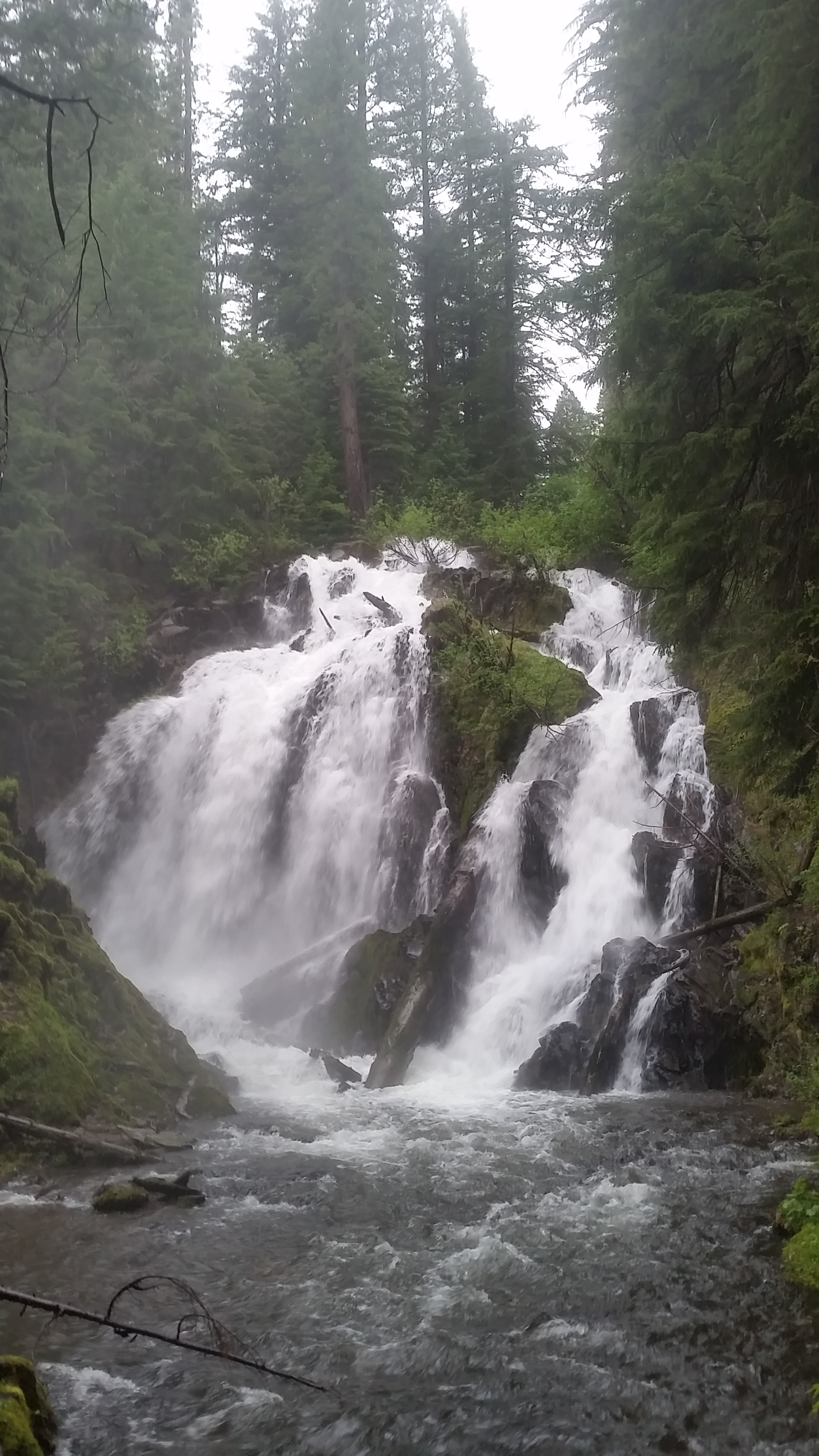
- National Creek Falls
- Interactive map of National Creek Falls
- Location: Douglas County, Oregon
- Coordinates: 43.03141°N 122.34466°W
- Type: Cascade, Plunge
- Elevation: 3,863 ft (1,177 m)
- Total height: 40 ft (12 m)
- Number of drops: 1
- Average width: 30 ft (9 m)
- Average flow rate: 150 cu ft/s (4.2 m^{3}/s)

National Creek Falls is a waterfall from National Creek, that plunges into a grotto surrounded by a meadow of mosses on the west skirt of the Crater Lake National Park, north of Union Creek, Oregon.

== History ==
National Creek Falls lays adjacent to Diamond Lake Road off US Route 62. The road was once a wagon route used for travel from the Rogue Valley to the newly discovered gold mines in the John Day Valley. The drainage of National Creek was then a popular layover site for miners and stock-men travelers that passed at Lake West towards the John Day Valley. After a fire devastated the area in the early 1860s the route was reopened in 1910 by the Forest Service, now known as Diamond Lake Road.

== Trail ==
National Creek Falls is located on pumice flanks of Mount Mazama with basalt outcropping that diverges the creek into a wide waterfall. The National Creek Falls trail starts off Crater Lake Highway and descends through a shaded, mixed conifer forest, ending at the base of National Creek Falls, totaling 0.75 mi (1.21 km).

== See also ==
- List of waterfalls in Oregon
