= Chitwood Falls =

Waterfall in Tillamook County, Oregon, US

- Interactive map of Chitwood Falls
- Location: Cascade Head Scenic Research Area
- Coordinates: 45.07499°N 124.00547°W
- Elevation: 138 ft (42 m)
- Total height: Unrated

Chitwood Falls is a waterfall from the Chitwood Creek, just before it empties into the Cascade Head North Marine Protected Area, in Tillamook County, Oregon. Access to Chitwood Falls is from Forest Road 1861.

== Trail ==
The trail to Chitwood Falls crosses a foot bridge approximately half mile into the trail. The trail ends at a bench overlooking the ocean. After this point there is no groomed path, at the end of the headland and evergreen trees, the waterfall can be seen at the backdrop of the coastal inlet to the left of the meadow.

== See also ==
- List of waterfalls in Oregon
