= Bonnie Falls =

- Interactive map of Bonnie Falls
- Coordinates: 45.80404°N 122.9376°W
- Type: Plunge
- Elevation: 383 ft (117 m)
- Total height: 15 ft (4.6 m)
- Average flow rate: 75 cu ft/s (2.1 m^{3}/s)

Bonnie Falls, also called Scappoose Falls is a small waterfall located in Columbia County, in the U.S. state of Oregon. The waterfall is known for a fish ladder that bypasses the waterfall to assist fish navigate the waterfall.

Bonnie Falls is located off of Highway 30, west of the small town of Scappoose.

== See also ==
- List of waterfalls in Oregon
