= Big Falls (Oregon) =

- Interactive map of Big Falls
- Location: Deschutes River
- Coordinates: 44.37136°N 121.29236°W
- Elevation: 2,470 ft (750 m)
- Total height: 30 ft (9.1 m)

Big Falls is a waterfall located near the town of Terrebonne in Deschutes County, in the U.S. state of Oregon. Big Falls is a mandatory portage on the right of the cascade. The main channel should not be approached by water craft because of the rocky nature of the riverbed.

== See also ==
- List of waterfalls
- List of waterfalls in Oregon
