= Awbrey Falls =

- Interactive map of Awbrey Falls
- Location: Deschutes River
- Coordinates: 44.1946°N 121.2943°W
- Type: Plunge
- Elevation: 3,058 ft (932 m)
- Average flow rate: 150 cu ft/s (4.2 m^{3}/s)

Awbrey Falls, is a waterfall located along Deschutes River in Deschutes County, in the U.S. state of Oregon. The waterfall is known for a long lava tube beneath the cascade.

The mandatory portage for Awbrey Falls is on the right. The main channel should not be approached because of the high current over the waterfall.

Approximately one mile before Awbrey Falls is a difficulty 2+ graded, low ledge rapids called Pot Hole. Immediately after Awbrey Falls is White Mile rapids with a difficulty of 3 that increases downstream.

== See also ==
- List of waterfalls in Oregon
