= Eagle Creek Upper Falls =

Upper Eagle Creek Falls
- Location within Oregon
- Location: Clackamas County, Oregon, United States
- Coordinates: 45.27762°N 122.19474°W
- Elevation: 955 ft (291 m)

Eagle Creek Upper Falls, also called Upper Eagle Creek Falls, is a small waterfall located in Clackamas County, in the U.S. state of Oregon. The waterfall is known for a fish ladder that bypasses the waterfall to assist fish navigate the waterfall. Eagle Creek is known for being a point for fishing chinook salmon, bull trout, and steelhead trout.

Upper Eagle Creek Falls is located upstream from the Eagle Creek National Fish Hatchery, a popular spot to start kayaking downstream Eagle Creek.

== See also ==
- List of rivers of Oregon
- List of waterfalls in Oregon
- Punch Bowl Falls
- Twister Falls
