= Baker Creek Falls =

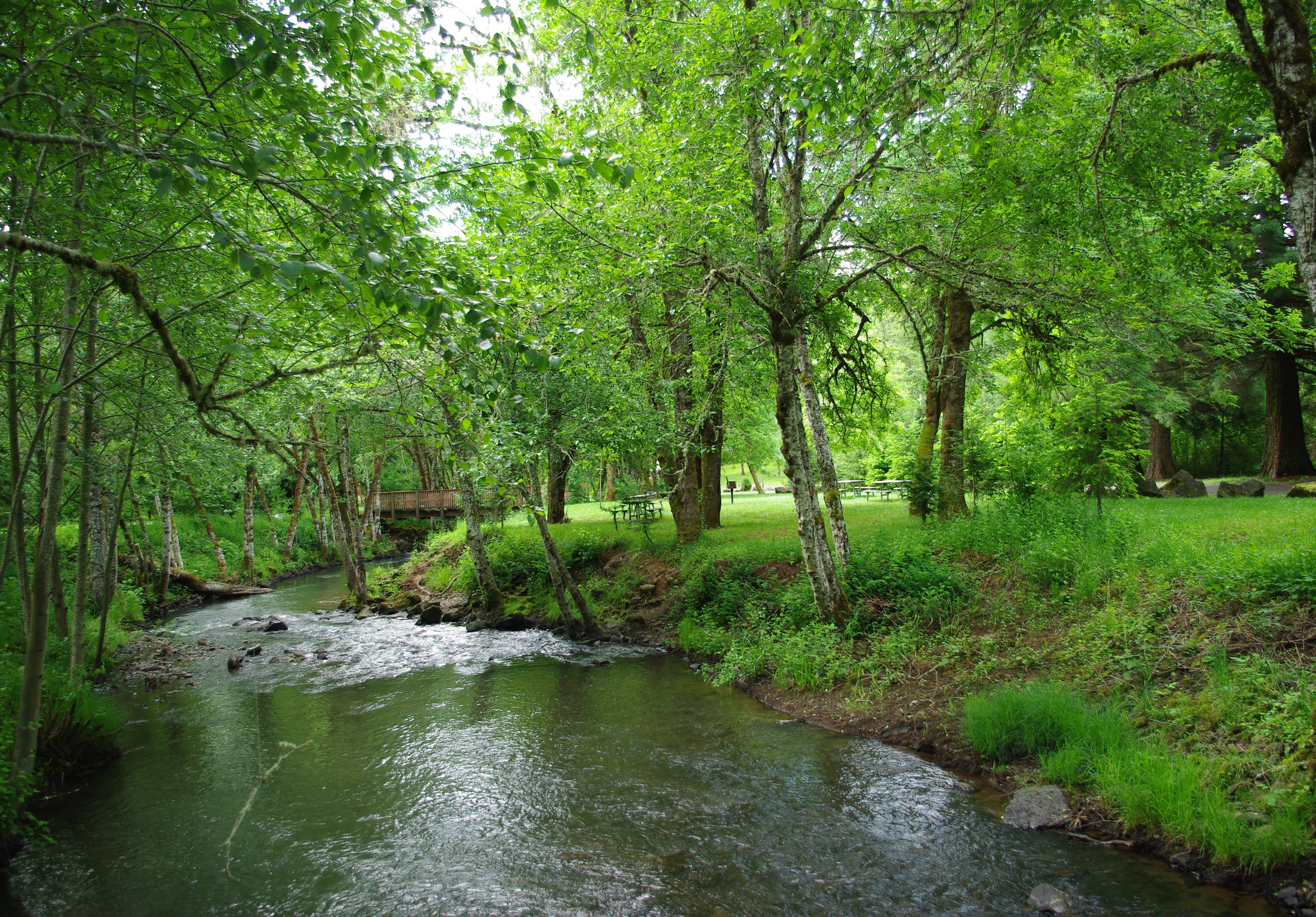
- Baker Creek and bridge at Ed Grenfell Park, 5 miles downstream from Baker Creek Falls
- Interactive map of Baker Creek Falls
- Location: Willamette Valley
- Coordinates: 44.87878°N 122.65886°W
- Type: Plunge
- Elevation: 827 ft (252 m)
- Total height: unconfirmed

Baker Creek Falls is a waterfall located at the east end of the city of McMinnville, in Yamhill County, in the U.S. state of Oregon. It is located off Baker Creek Road on the north skirt of Slide Mountain, five miles upstream from Ed Grenfell Park and the Miller Woods Conservation Area. Other waterfalls surround Baker Creek, including Burton Creek Falls, Slide Mountain Falls and Gilbert Creek Falls; all of difficult access or located within private properties.

== See also ==
- List of waterfalls in Oregon
