= Copper Creek Falls (Oregon) =

Waterfall in Union County, Oregon

- Interactive map of Copper Creek Falls
- Location: Wallowa-Whitman National Forest
- Coordinates: 45.09389°N 117.38528°W
- Elevation: 6,046 ft (1,843 m)
- Total height: Unrated

Copper Creek Falls is a waterfall from Copper Creek, just before it empties into Eagle Creek at Bench Canyon, in Union County, Oregon, United States. Access to Copper Creek Falls is from a trail that parallels the river for over 15 mi (24 km).

== See also ==
- List of waterfalls in Oregon
