= Wolf Creek Falls (Oregon) =

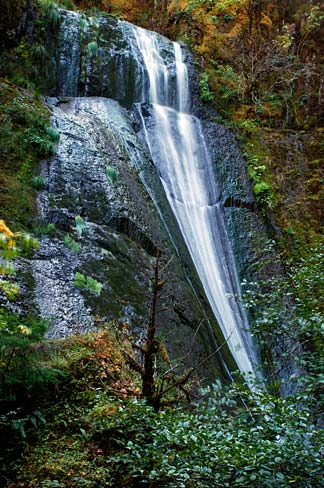
- Wolf Creek Falls in the fall
- Interactive map of Wolf Creek Falls
- Location: Umpqua National Forest
- Coordinates: 43.21828°N 122.94758°W
- Type: Tiered
- Elevation: 1,315 ft (401 m)
- Total height: 125 ft (38 m)
- Number of drops: 2

Wolf Creek Falls, is a two tier waterfall located on the west skirt of the Umpqua National Forest, in Douglas County, in the U.S. state of Oregon. It is located in a privileged area where rivers of the forest create several waterfalls: Cavitt Creek Falls, and Shadow Falls are within five miles of Wolf Creek Falls. Grotto Falls is further to the east off Little River Road and National Forest Road 2703.

== Trail ==
Wolf Creek Falls totals 125 ft (38 m) fall in two wide cascades and is the centerpiece attraction of the Wolf Creek Falls trailhead and Recreation Site. A foot trail loops out and back for a total of approximately 2.3 mi (3.7 km) starting near Glide, Oregon. The first mile of the trail is wheelchair accessible with view points of the dense conifer forests.

== See also ==
- List of waterfalls in Oregon
