= Chocolate Falls (Jackson County, Oregon) =

- Interactive map of Chocolate Falls
- Location: Klamath National Forest
- Coordinates: 42.02222°N 122.63444°W
- Elevation: 3,111 ft (948 m)
- Total height: Unrated

Chocolate Falls is a waterfall in the Bear Gulch valley, east side of the Klamath National Forest, south of Ashland in Jackson County, Oregon. Access to Chocolate Falls is from Colestin Road, south of the Trashi Chöling Buddhist Center and Temple Garden. Bear Gulch valley and its surrounding Mudusa Flat forest has several caves, as well as meadows and old-growth sugar pine. The Pacific Crest Trail passes just north of Chocolate Falls.

== See also ==
- List of waterfalls in Oregon
