= Wildwood Falls =

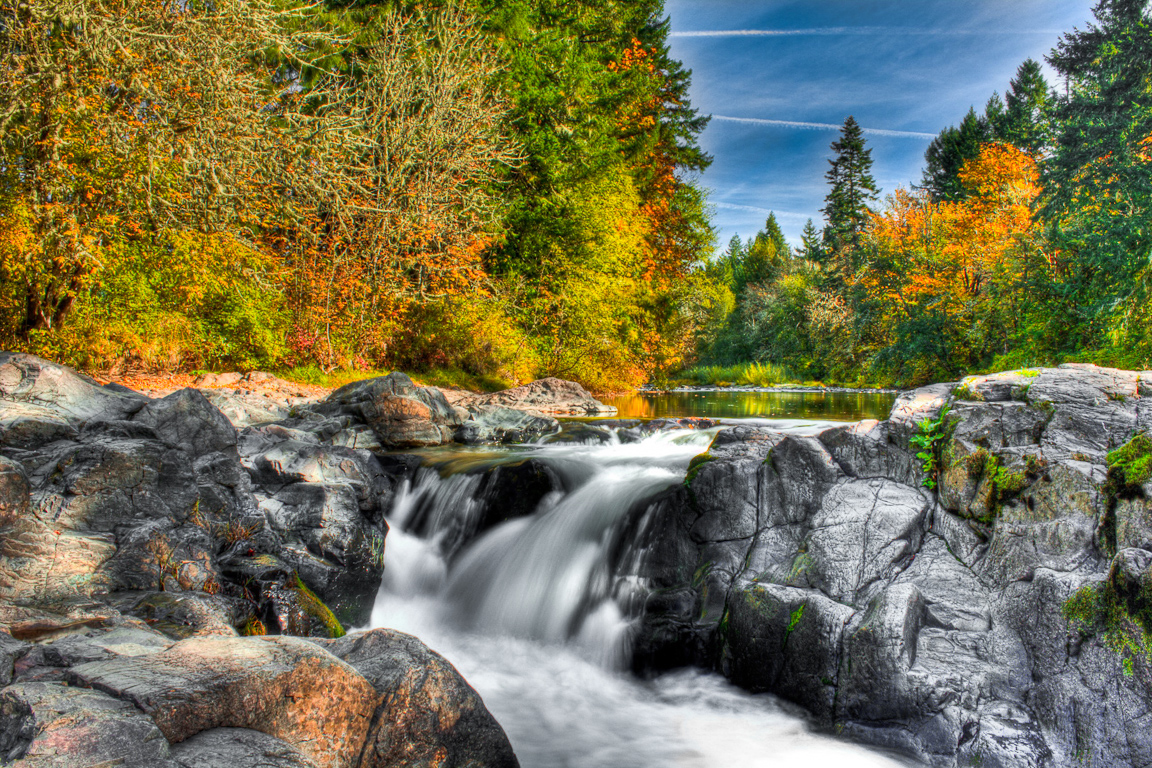
- Wildwood Falls basalt cliff and hardrock
- Interactive map of Wildwood Falls
- Location: Umpqua National Forest
- Coordinates: 43.6998°N 122.81865°W
- Type: Segmented Plunges
- Elevation: 1,005 ft (306 m)
- Total height: 15 ft (4.6 m)
- Number of drops: 1

Wildwood Falls, also known as Row River Falls, is a waterfall located in Lane County, in the U.S. state of Oregon. A day or annual pass is required from Lanecounty.org. Don't expect to get cell service here.

It has 2 sites on both sides of the falls, Lassels D Stewart Country Park on Row River Rd and Wildwood falls on Bryce Creek.

The Lassels D Stewart side offers gradual trails, available parking, and a more open space.

The Wildwood side offers cliff-jumping in warm seasons, two rougher trails down the falls, and farther away from the fall a steep trail which follows the creek bed back to the falls. Often good rock hounding has been noted as the other side contains little to no rocks.

== Trail ==
Wildwood Falls totals 15 ft (4.6 m) fall in a wide cascade and is the centerpiece attraction of the Wildwood Falls trailhead and Recreation Site. A foot trail loops out and back for a total of approximately 2.3 mi (3.7 km) starting near Culp Creek, Oregon.

== See also ==
- List of waterfalls in Oregon
