= Buck Falls (Oregon) =

- Interactive map of Buck Falls
- Location: Willamette Valley
- Coordinates: 45.12426°N 119.64973°W
- Elevation: 3,629 ft (1,106 m)
- Total height: unconfirmed

Buck Falls is a waterfall located at the east end of historical Hardman, in Morrow County, in the U.S. state of Oregon. It is located off Hepner-Spray Highway, formed by a spring creek on the north skirt of Buck Canyon.

== See also ==
- List of waterfalls in Oregon
