= Moon Falls =

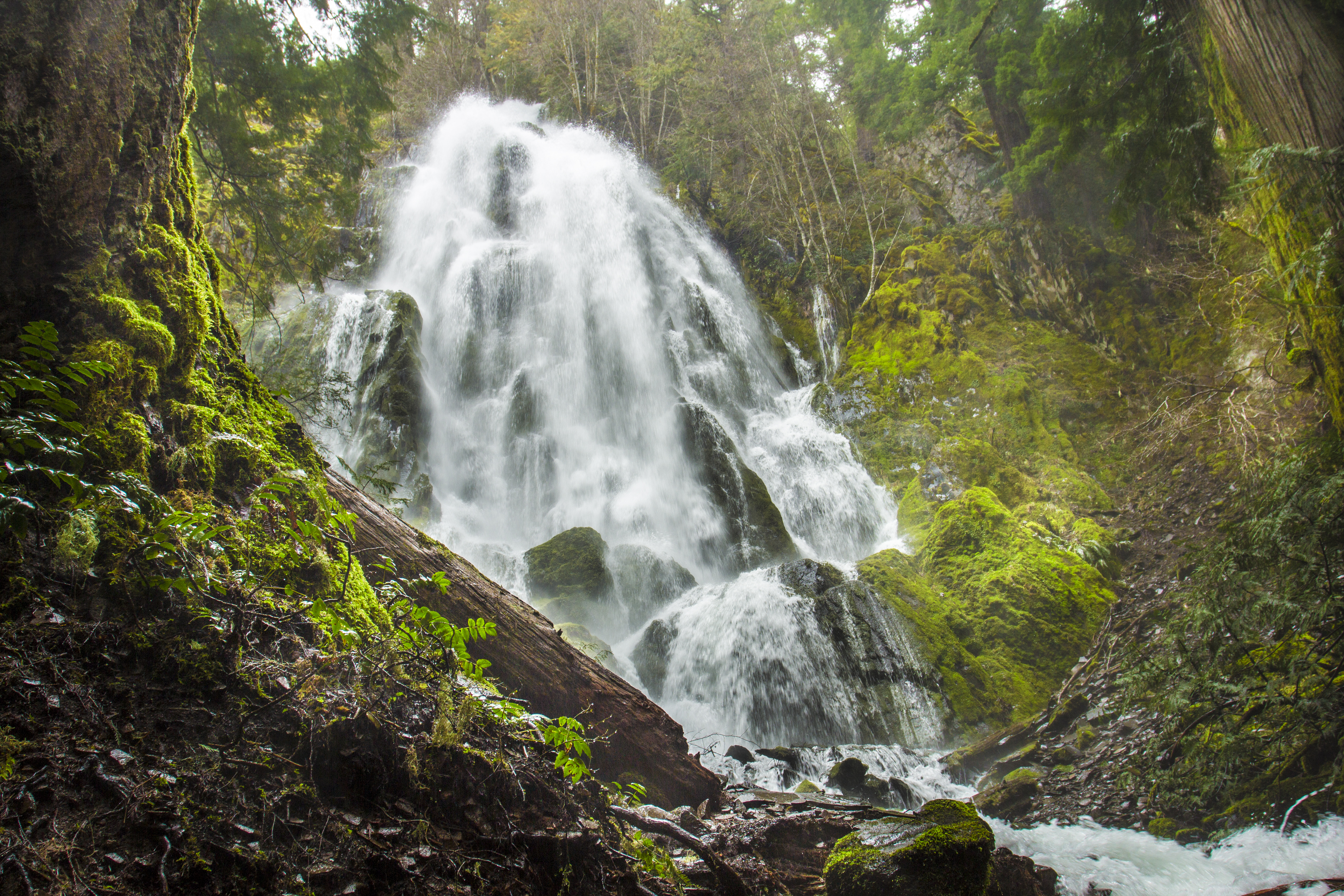
- Moonfalls in the winter
- Interactive map of Moon Falls
- Location: Umpqua National Forest Cottage Grove Ranger District
- Coordinates: 43.73562°N 122.61111°W
- Type: Horsetail
- Elevation: 3,025 ft (922 m)
- Total height: 100 ft (30 m)

Moon Falls, also spelled Moonfalls, is a waterfall located on the west edge of the Umpqua National Forest in Lane County, in the U.S. state of Oregon. It totals 100 feet fall in one wide veiling cascade and is 1.5 miles from Spirit Falls trailhead.

== Description ==
The falls drops in a wide cascade down approximately 100 feet (30 m) over a sharp protrusion of basalt which causes veiling of the cascade the entire distance to the pool. Alex Creek, from which the waterfall is produced, mostly flows during the winter months, hence it loses much of its volume later in the Summer.

== Trails ==
A paved foot trail loops through mixed forest stands that starts at the trailhead off spur route #1702-203, approximately 50 mi from the town of Oakridge. It totals 1 miles out and back of easy hiking. Moonfalls trail is located in the Layng Creek Municipal Watershed and overnight camping is not allowed.

== See also ==
- List of waterfalls in Oregon
