= Paulina Creek Falls =

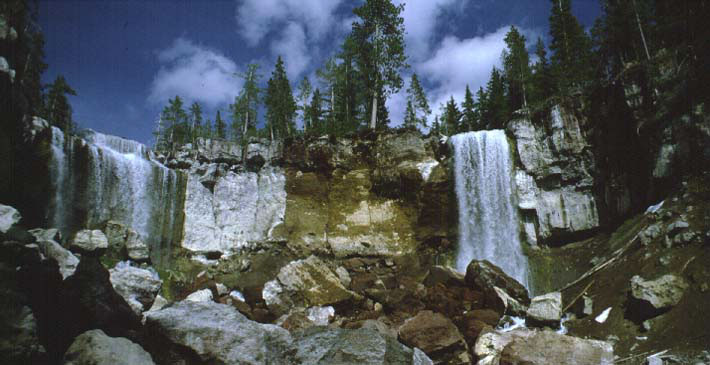
- Paulina Creek Falls in the Summer
- Interactive map of Paulina Creek Falls
- Location: Deschutes County, Oregon
- Coordinates: 43°42′45″N 121°16′57″W
- Type: Cascade, Plunge
- Elevation: 6,232 ft (1,900 m)
- Total height: 80 ft (24 m)
- Number of drops: 1
- Average width: 40 ft (12 m)
- Average flow rate: 50 cu ft/s (1.4 m^{3}/s)

Paulina Creek Falls is a cascade and plunge waterfall from a streambed draining from Paulina Lake in Newberry National Volcanic Monument, south of Bend, Oregon. The waterfall is notable for its side-by-side drop of 80 feet (24 m) that surrounds a small island at the edge of the cliff.

== Trails ==
A paved foot out and back trail leads to Paulina Falls starting at the trailhead located at the Paulina Falls Day Use Area off Paulina Lake Road (Hw 21). The trail leads to the bottom and the top of the waterfall. Road 21 into Newberry Caldera with access to Monument summer trails is closed in the winter due to snow.

== See also ==
- List of waterfalls in Oregon
