= Annie Falls =

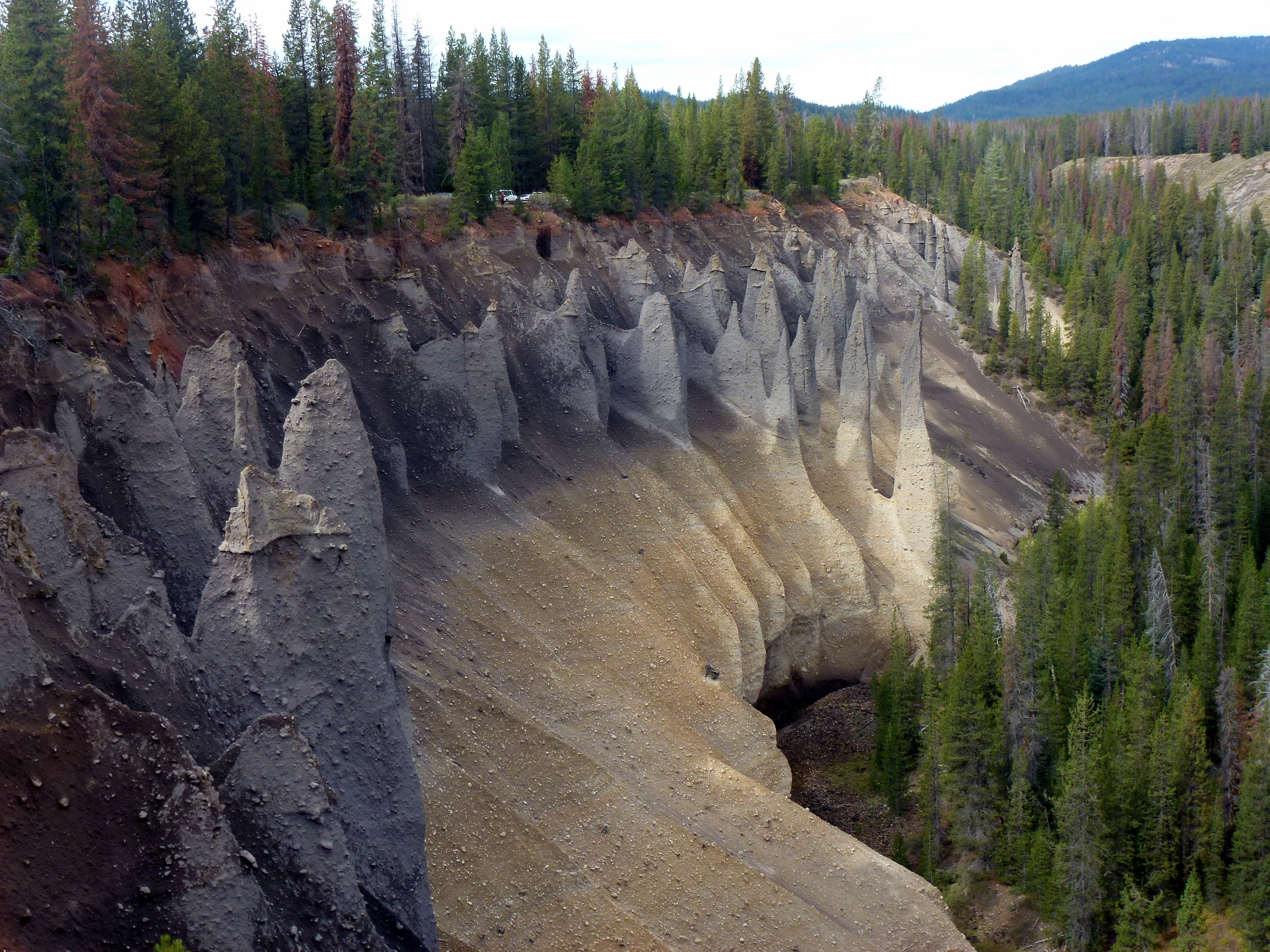
- Crater Lake Pinnacles and Annie Creek Canyon
- Interactive map of Annie Falls
- Location: Crater Lake National Park
- Coordinates: 42.81748°N 122.11403°W
- Type: Plunge
- Elevation: 5,100 ft (1,600 m)
- Total height: 53 ft (16 m)
- Average flow rate: 150 cu ft/s (4.2 m^{3}/s)

Annie Falls, is the tallest of three waterfalls so named, located along Annie Creek in the Crater Lake National Park at the south end of Rim Village Historic District, in Klamath County, in the U.S. state of Oregon. It is located in a steep canyon area surrounded by walls of petrified volcanic ash as a consequence of the Mount Mazama eruption. The location of Annie Creek Falls deep in the Annie Creek canyon makes it very difficult to reach the waterfall. Partial views of the cascade can be seen from a picnic area off the Volcanic Legacy Scenic Byway south of Crater Peak. Access to Annie Creek is available at the USFS snow park, both the creek and the waterfall possess a high water flow.

== See also ==
- List of waterfalls in Oregon
