= Wilson Falls (Oregon) =

- Interactive map of Wilson Falls
- Location: Tillamook State Forest
- Coordinates: 45.57002°N 123.57282°W
- Type: Steep cascade
- Elevation: 720 ft (220 m)
- Total height: 200 ft (61 m)

Wilson Falls, is a waterfall located in Tillamook County, in the U.S. state of Oregon. It is located in a secluded area on the heart of the Tillamook State Forest, just south of Smith Homestead Forest and north of the community of Jordan Creek. The waterfall follows the Wilson River Trail and the Footbridge Trailhead, a short distance from Oregon Route 6.

== See also ==
- List of waterfalls in Oregon
