= Chichester Falls =

Waterfall in Lane County, Oregon, US

- Interactive map of Chichester Falls
- Location: Willamette National Forest
- Coordinates: 43.97028°N 122.53778°W
- Elevation: 1,114 ft (340 m)
- Total height: Unrated

Chichester Falls is a waterfall from the Andy Creek, just east of Fall Creek Lake, in Lane County, Oregon. Access to Chicester Falls is from Forest Road 18, known as Big Fall Creek Road, approximately a half mile from Bedrock Campground.

== See also ==
- List of waterfalls in Oregon
