= Cushing Falls =

Waterfall along Fifteenmile Creek

Cushings Falls
- Interactive map of Cushings Falls
- Location: South Fork Coquille River
- Coordinates: 45.61167°N 121.11972°W
- Type: Staircase
- Elevation: 128 ft (39 m)
- Total height: 8 ft (2.4 m)
- Number of drops: 2
- Average flow rate: 330 cu ft/s (9 m^{3}/s)

Cushing Falls, is a waterfall located south of Seufert County park on the shore of the Columbia River, just east of The Dalles, in Wasco County, in the U.S. state of Oregon. It totals 8 feet waterfall along the course of Fifteenmile Creek surrounded by a dryer natural environment than the western flank of the Columbia Gorge.

== Location ==
The waters of the Fifteenmile Creek and Cushing Falls as well as Petersburg Falls further upstream, are located at a point where the Rain Shadow effect downside of the Columbia Gorge. The trail that leads to the waterfall spins off the left side of SE Frontage road.

== See also ==
- List of waterfalls in Oregon
