= Cascade Falls (Linn County, Oregon) =

Waterfall in Oregon, United States

- Interactive map of Cascade Falls
- Location: Middle Santiam Wilderness
- Coordinates: 44.54571°N 122.42864°W
- Elevation: 1,177 ft (359 m)
- Total height: Unrated

Cascade Falls is a waterfall from the Quartzville Creek in Linn County, Oregon. The waterfall is known for being a point for river rafting through the Quartzville corridor and is the centerpiece attraction of the Dogwood Recreation Site.

== See also ==
- List of waterfalls in Oregon
