= Wallalute Falls =

Coordinates: 45.411418°N 121.656282°W

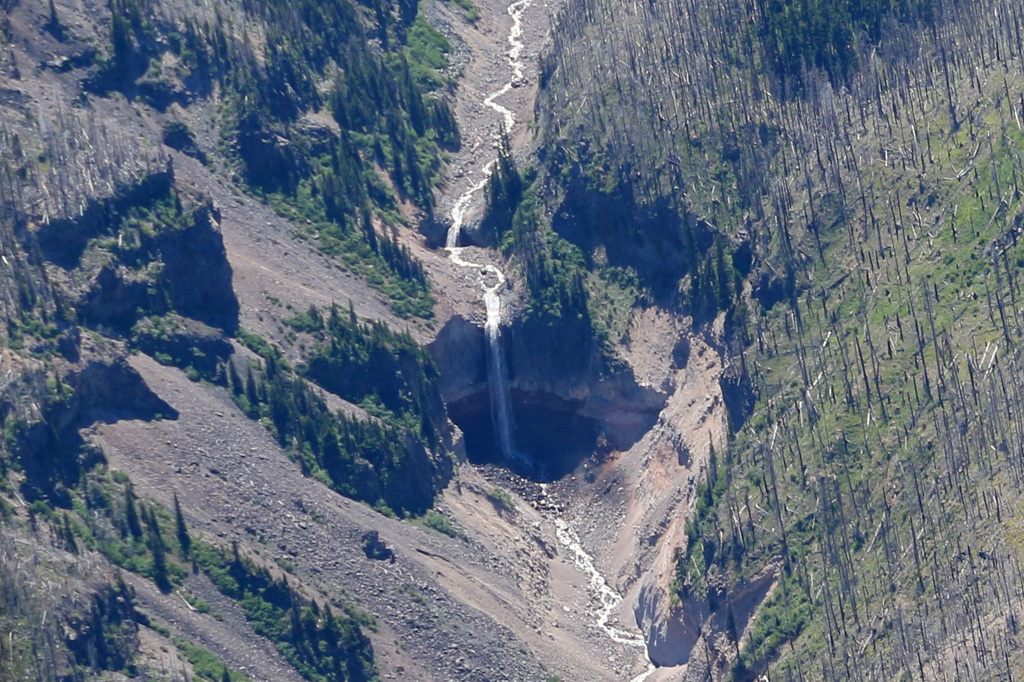
An aerial view of Wallalute Falls, June 2015

Wallalute Falls is a large waterfall located on Compass Creek on the north slopes of Mount Hood in the Hood River County, Oregon, at an elevation of 4,879 feet (1,487 m). For many years maps have mislabeled the location of Wallalute Falls locating it on the Eliot Branch of the West Fork Hood River, one canyon over from Compass Creek where it is still labeled on maps today. Historical documentation in Jack Grauer's book A Complete History of Mt Hood, however, provides 1890s-era photos of two waterfalls located in this area, one labeled Wallalute and one labeled "Strawnahans" (a misspelling of the last name of Oscar Stranahan, a local pioneer), where only "Strawnahans" Falls is a photographic match to the actual waterfall located on the Eliot Branch visible from the Cloud Cap road at Inspiration Point.

The name Wallalute is a local Native American name meaning "strong water" and was chosen as the name for the large falls on Compass Creek by local pioneer Ann Lang.

The actual height of Wallalute Falls on Compass Creek is as yet unknown. There is another smaller waterfall just downstream of the original Wallalute historically named Canon Balls Falls located adjacent to a place referenced as "Adam's Hole". Shortly after the 2011 explorations of Compass Creek's canyon, The Dollar Lake Fire burned most of this area.
