= Duwee Falls =

- Interactive map of Duwee Falls
- Location: Crater Lake National Park
- Coordinates: 42.86445°N 122.14725°W
- Type: Tiered Cascade
- Elevation: 5,950 ft (1,814 m)
- Total height: 100 ft (30 m)
- Number of drops: 1
- Average width: 15 ft (5 m)
- Watercourse: Munson Creek
- Average flow rate: 50 cu ft/s (1.4 m^{3}/s)

Duwee Falls is a steep tiered waterfall on Munson Creek, a tributary of the Klamath River, that plunges into a gaping canyon within the Crater Lake National Park in the U.S. state of Oregon. The waterfall is notable for its main drop of 100 feet (30 m) which makes it the highest plunge waterfall in Crater Lake Park.
