= Abiqua Creek =

River in Oregon, United States of America

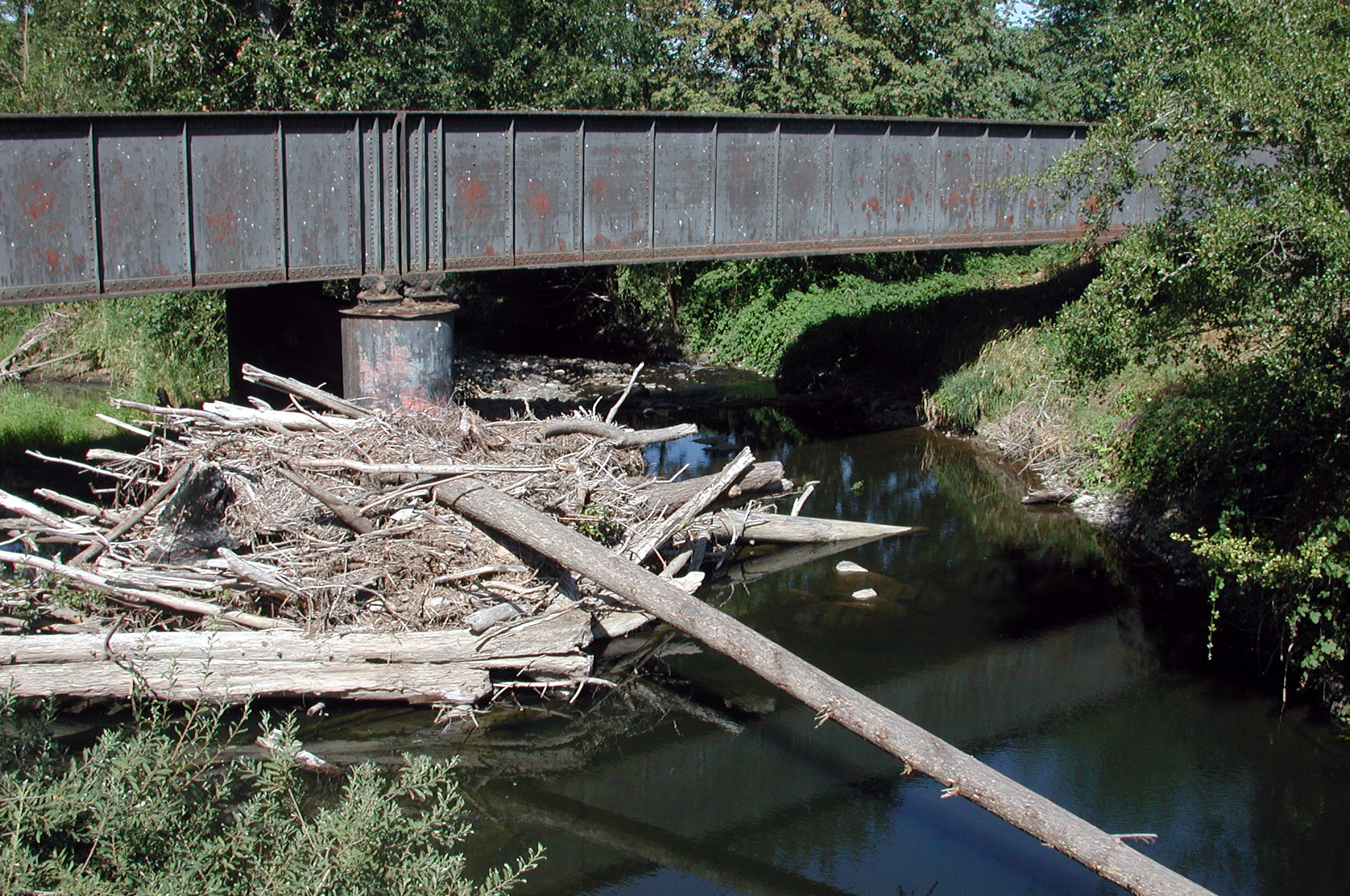
- Abiqua Creek from Oregon Route 214

- Location of the mouth of Abiqua Creek in Oregon
- Etymology: Possibly from a Kalapuyan word for "hazelnut"

Location
- Country: United States
- State: Oregon
- County: Marion

Physical characteristics
- Source
  - location: Cascade Range foothills
  - coordinates: 44°52′32″N 122°24′29″W
  - elevation: 3,331 ft (1,015 m)
- Mouth: Pudding River
  - location: near Silverton
  - coordinates: 45°02′10″N 122°49′56″W
  - elevation: 154 ft (47 m)
- Length: 29 mi (47 km)
- Basin size: 78 sq mi (200 km^{2})

Abiqua Creek (/ˈæbɪkwə/ AB-ih-kwə) is a tributary of the Pudding River in the U.S. state of Oregon. The creek originates near Lookout Mountain in the foothills of the Cascade Range in the northwestern part of the state. It flows northwest for about 29 miles (47 km) to its confluence with the Pudding, about 2 miles (3.2 km) west of Silverton, in the Willamette Valley. About 20 miles (32 km) north of Silverton, the Pudding River meets the Molalla River, which meets the Willamette River less than 1 mile (1.6 km) later near Canby.

The creek is the main source of drinking water for Silverton, which operates a diversion dam upstream. The city, the Pudding River Watershed Council, and the Oregon Department of Fish and Wildlife are working to improve fish passage on the creek and are studying the effectiveness of the dam's fish ladder. Abiqua Creek has historically supported the largest steelhead spawning populations in the Pudding River watershed.

== Course ==
The creek begins in the Abiqua Basin about 5 miles (8 km) north-northeast of Silver Falls State Park and flows down a canyon. Ridges on the north and south separate its watershed from Silver Creek on the south and Butte Creek on the north. Named tributaries include Sweet Spring Creek, entering from the left about river mile (RM) 26 or river kilometer (RK) 42; Wildcat Creek, from the left about 2 miles (3.2 km) later; Trinity Falls Creek from the right about 21 miles (34 km) from the mouth, and over the next 2 miles (3.2 km) Bucket Creek from the right, Homestead Creek from the left, Johnson Creek from the right, and Goober Creek from the right, in that order.

=== Abiqua Falls ===
Just below Goober Creek near Santiam State Forest, the stream plunges 101 feet (31 m) over Abiqua Falls. The United States Geological Survey (USGS) places the falls at coordinates 44.9265111°N 122.5667521°W at an elevation of 1,358 feet (414 m) above sea level. Abiqua Falls is accessible 0.35 miles from the Abiqua Falls trailhead. Downstream of the falls, the creek runs close by Milk Ranch Road and then Abiqua Road, both on the right. At about RM 12 (RK 19), Abiqua Creek receives Hammond Creek, and shortly thereafter Echo Creek, and about 4 miles (6.4 km) later, Powers Creek, all from the left.

=== Gallon House Bridge ===
About 4.5 miles (7.2 km) from the mouth, the stream passes under Oregon Route 213 between Silverton and Molalla, and about 1 mile (1.6 km) from the mouth it goes under Oregon Route 214 between Silverton and Mount Angel. Shortly thereafter, it passes under Gallon House Road, which is carried by the covered Gallon House Bridge. It crosses under Mount Angel Highway before reaching the Pudding River, 45.7 miles (73.5 km) by river from its confluence with the Molalla River.

=== Discharge ===
The Marion Soil and Water Conservation District operates a stream monitor on Abiqua Creek at Gallon House Road about 0.5 miles (0.8 km) from the mouth. District calculations based on data from the monitor suggest that the flow of the creek there varies from near zero to about 250 cubic feet per second (7.1 m^{3}/s). These figures do not include readings near flood stage because the district's monitor cannot safely measure the highest flows.

== Reservoir and fish ladder ==
Abiqua Creek is the main water supply for the city of Silverton, which also gets water from Silver Creek and stores water in Silverton Reservoir. The Abiqua Creek water reaches the city from a diversion dam in the Cascade Range foothills at RM 10.4 (RK 16.7). The diversion dam's higher elevation above sea level allows water to flow to the Silverton water treatment plant without pumping.

In 2007, the city of Silverton, the Pudding River Watershed Council, and the Oregon Department of Fish and Wildlife (ODFW) began a project to improve fish passage on Abiqua Creek. The first stage of the project involves evaluating the effectiveness of the fish ladder on the city's diversion dam, built in 1916. The creek supports native populations of winter steelhead and has the potential to support spring chinook salmon. Abiqua Creek has historically supported the largest steelhead spawning populations in the Pudding River watershed. A catch-and-release fishing season for coastal cutthroat trout begins at the end of May, but the creek is closed to salmon and steelhead fishing.

== See also ==
- List of rivers of Oregon
