= Shellburg Falls =

Waterfall in Oregon

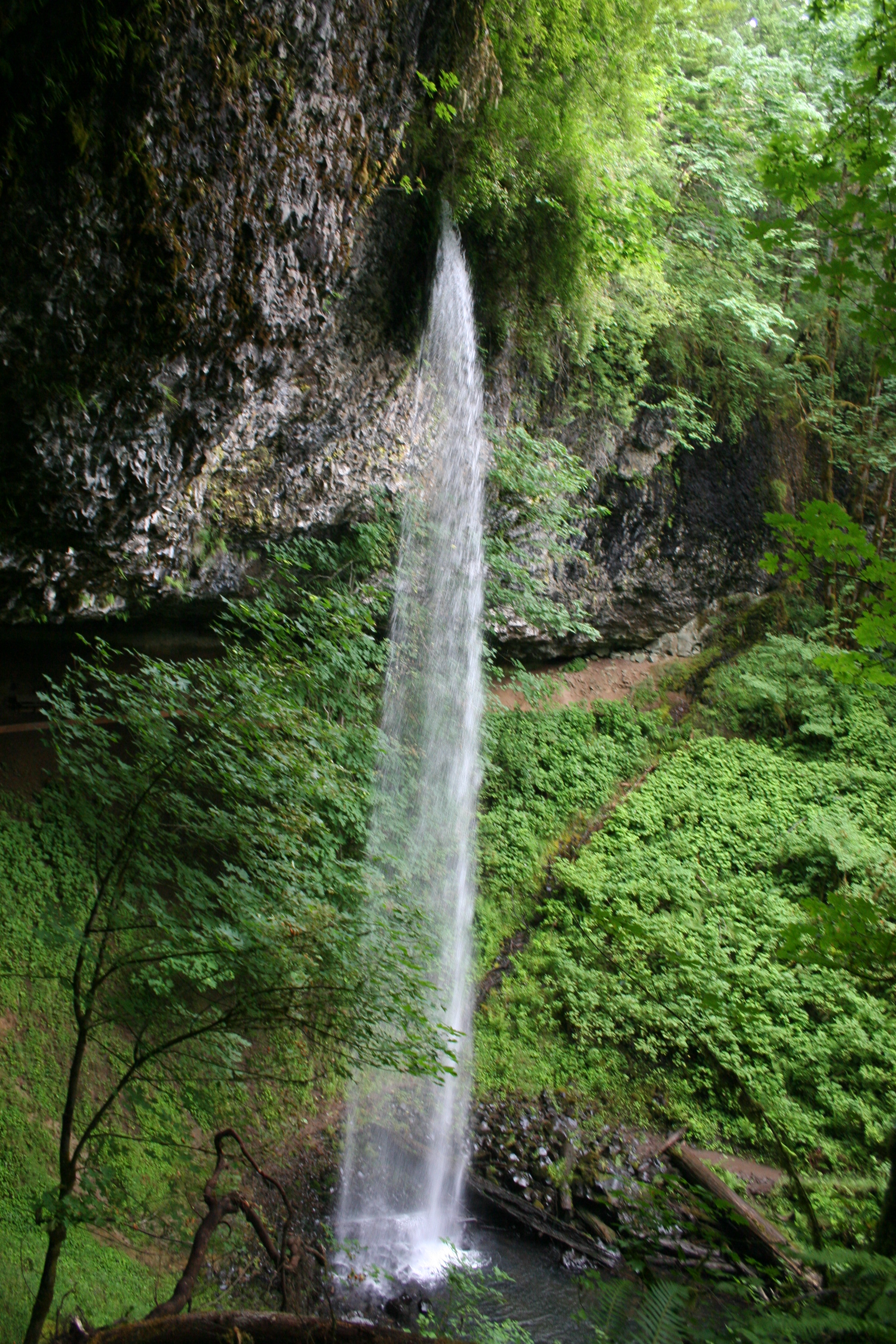
- Shellburg Falls
- Interactive map of Shellburg Falls
- Location: Santiam State Forest
- Coordinates: 44.8125°N 122.60856°W
- Type: Plunge
- Elevation: 1,362 ft (415 m)
- Total height: 100 ft (30 m)
- Average flow rate: 20 cu ft/s (0.6 m^{3}/s)

Shellburg Falls is a waterfall located in the Santiam State Forest along the Stout Creek canyon in Oregon. The waterfall sits about 2.5 miles north of Lyons, Oregon. Shellburg Falls is 100 feet tall and is about 10 feet wide on average. Shellburg Falls sits upstream from Lower Shellburg Falls and is only half a mile from Stasel Falls. The waterfall sits along Shellburg Creek which relies on rainfall to flow. This means that in the summers Shellburg Falls is very weak. Shellburg Falls is also located close to Mulkey Creek Falls, Ayers Creek Falls, Silver Falls State Park, and many other waterfalls.
