= Stasel Falls =

Waterfall in Oregon, US

- Stasel Falls
- Interactive map of Stasel Falls
- Location: 2.5 miles N of Lyons, Oregon
- Coordinates: 44.8086737°N 122.600567°W
- Type: Tiered Horsetails
- Elevation: 1,257 ft (383 m)
- Total height: 125 ft (38 m)
- Number of drops: 2
- Average flow rate: 15 cu ft/s (0.4 m^{3}/s)

Stasel Falls is a waterfall located on private property, not accessible to the public near Santiam State Forest, Oregon, United States. The waterfall is 125 feet tall. The waterfall has two drops that are each about 60 feet tall. It is located near two other waterfalls, Shellburg Falls and Lower Shellburg Falls. The river that supplies the waterfall is Stout Creek.
