= Santiam State Forest =

State forest in Oregon, United States

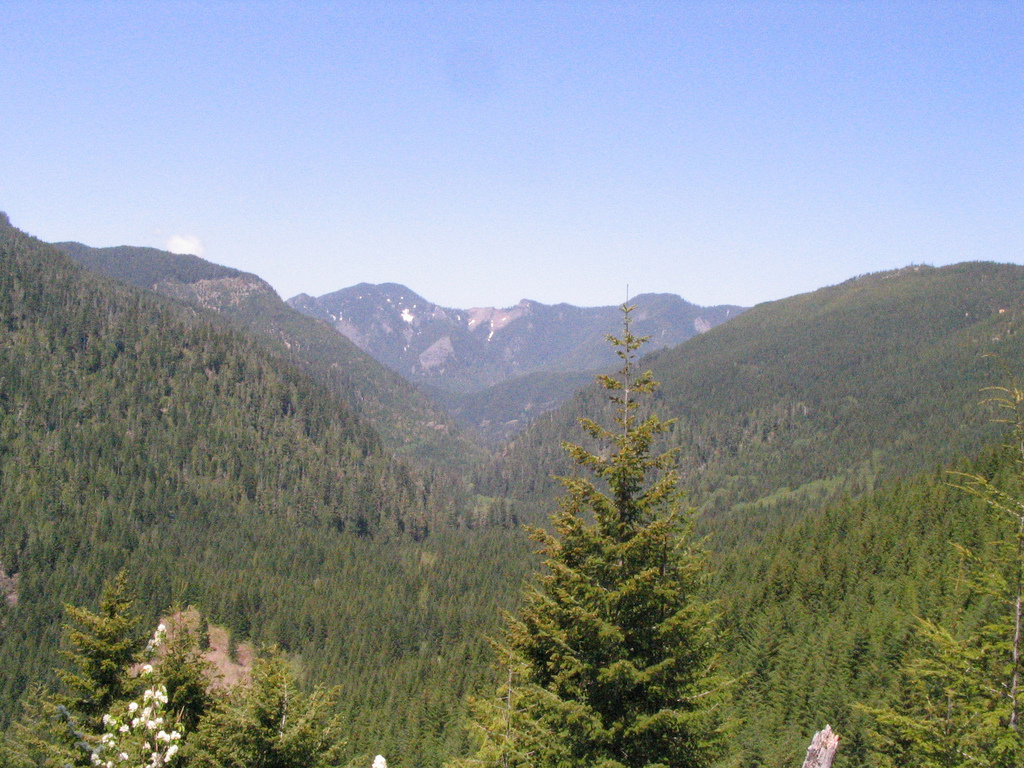
- Santiam State Forest, May 2009
- Interactive map of Santiam State Forest
- Type: Public, state
- Location: Clackamas, Linn, and Marion counties in Oregon, United States
- Coordinates: 44.71651°N 122.41786°W
- Area: 47,871 acres (193.73 km^{2})
- Operator: Oregon Department of Forestry

Santiam State Forest is one of six state forests managed by the Oregon Department of Forestry. The forest is located approximately 25 miles (40 km) southeast of Salem, Oregon, and includes 47,871 acres (193.73 km^{2}) on the western slope of the Cascade Mountains in three Oregon counties: Clackamas, Linn, and Marion. It is bounded on the east by the Willamette National Forest and Mount Hood National Forest. Silver Falls State Park is located west of the forest. The rest of the land surrounding the forest belongs to the Bureau of Land Management or is privately owned. The forest is managed as part of the Department of Forestry's North Cascade District.

== Forest ownership ==
Oregon state forests consist of two types of land, Oregon Board of Forestry lands and Common School Forest Lands. These lands were acquired from two sources, are controlled by two different state entities and each has a distinct legal mandate that guides its management.

Board of Forestry lands were acquired either through direct purchase or through ownership transfer from Oregon counties in exchange for a portion of the land’s timber revenue. The Department of Forestry manages these forest lands under the direction of the Board of Forestry. By law, these lands are managed to achieve a healthy, productive, and sustainable forest ecosystems that provides the people of Oregon a full range of economic, social, and environmental benefits. The majority of the forest revenue is distributed to Oregon counties and local taxing districts. In the Santiam State Forest, 46,827 acres (189.50 km^{2}) i.e. about 98 percent of the land belongs to the Board of Forestry.

When Oregon was granted statehood in 1859, it received 3,500,000 acres (14,000 km^{2}) of grazing and forest lands from the Federal Government specifically to support public schools. These lands are known as Common School Forest Lands and are owned by the Oregon State Land Board. The board consists of the Governor of Oregon, the Oregon Secretary of State, and the Oregon State Treasurer. The Department of Forestry manages Common School Forest Lands under a contract with the State Land Board. The purpose of these lands are to generate the greatest amount of revenue over the long run for the Common School Fund consistent with sound land and timber management practices. In the Santiam State Forest, only 887 acres (3.59 km^{2}) i.e. about 2 percent are owned by the State Land Board.

== History ==
Most of the land that makes up the Santiam State Forest was originally owned by large timber companies, often associated with railroads. The forest was heavily logged between 1880 and 1930. Most landowners did not reforest the logged areas, leaving the land to regenerate naturally. Forest fires burned large areas as well.

During the Great Depression, many owners saw little value in these lands and stopped paying taxes on their properties. As a result, counties acquired the land because of delinquent taxes or purchased the land for minimal amounts prior to foreclosure. Soon after these transactions occurred, the Oregon state legislature began allowing counties to turn their forest lands over to the state Board of Forestry. In exchange, the counties receive a portion of the timber revenue from the land.

Santiam State Forest land in Linn County was acquired by the Board of Forestry between 1939 and 1949. Marion County lands were acquired between 1940 and 1953, and Clackamas County lands were deeded to the state between 1942 and 1950. From 1943 to 1952, the state acquired additional forest land from private land owners through purchases and charitable donations.

By the time ownership passed to the state, natural regeneration had successfully reforested most of the forest. However, a large fire in 1951 burned nearly half the Santiam forest. The Department of Forestry quickly replanted the burned area. Prior to 1968, forest management activities were conducted by workers operating out of the department’s Salem office. In 1968, a new forest headquarters was built in Mehama, Oregon.

A large forest fire in late summer 2020 has led to much of the forest being closed including the Shellbrook falls trailhead etc.

== Topography ==
Santiam State Forest geologic history began 40 million years ago with the eruption of a chain of volcanoes, today’s Cascade Mountains. During the Miocene era, 15 million years ago, the area was tilted and cracked resulting in many new lava flows. The rocks that result from this geologic activity are mostly basalt, andesitic flows, volcanic breccia, and tuff with smaller amounts of other igneous rocks.

Elevations in Santiam State Forest range from 1,000 to 5,000 feet (1,500 m) above sea level. The terrain is characterized by long, steep slopes leading to broad ridge tops. Stream channels are common, and in most cases, have cut deeply into the hills. Higher elevations are rocky, especially on very steep slopes and ridge crests.

== Water resources ==
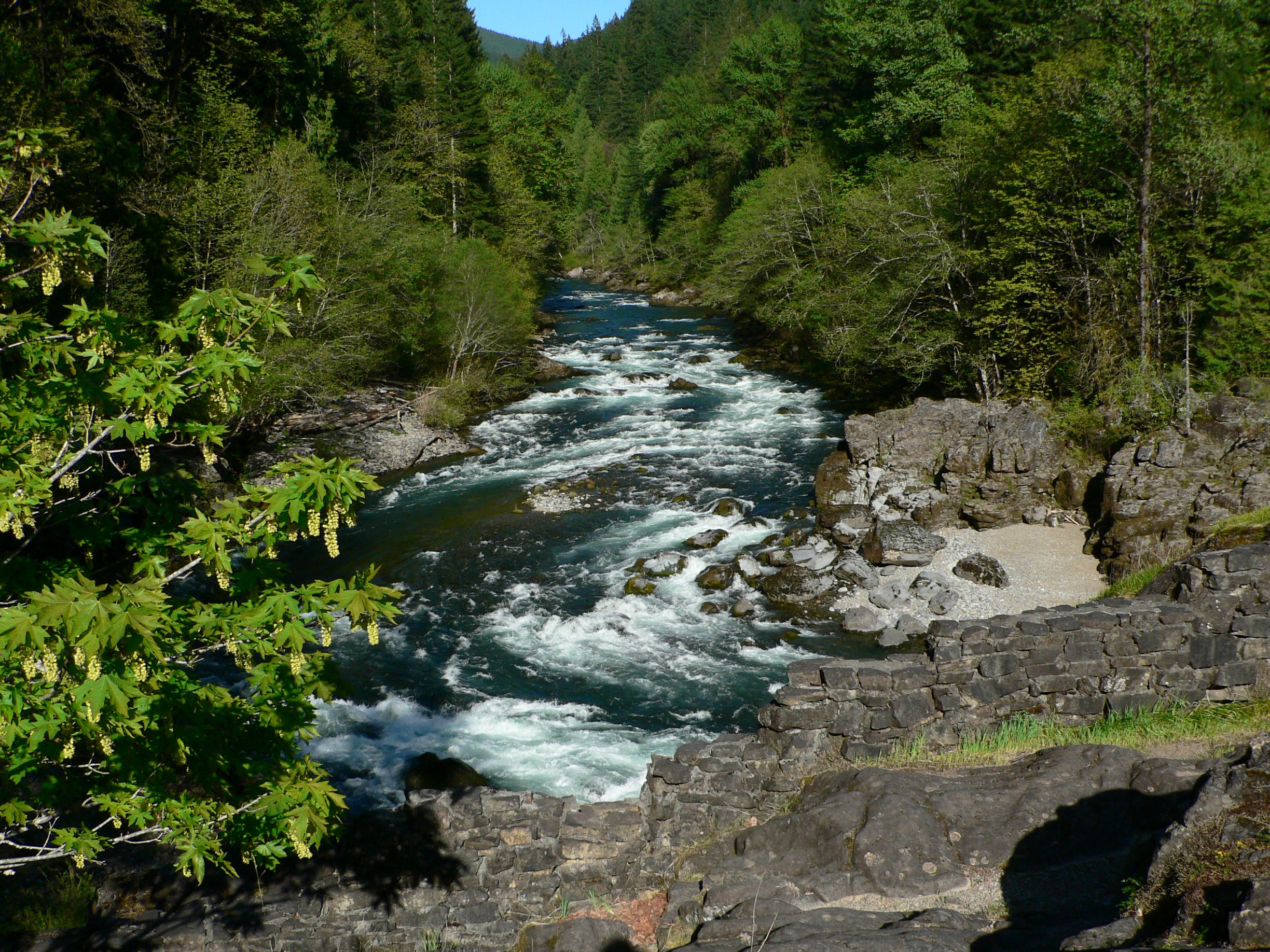
North Santiam River near Green and Mad Creek basins

The Santiam State Forest has a temperate mountain climate. Late fall and winter seasons are normally wet, receives approximately 70 inches (1,800 mm) of precipitation per year. In winter, snow accumulation is not heavy except at the highest elevations. Summers are generally dry and warm. Extremely hot days are rare.

Portions of the Santiam State Forest are located within the community watershed areas for a number of Oregon cities including Detroit, Gates, Mehama, Lyons, Mills City, Salem, Stayton, Scotts Mill, and Silverton. In the southern area of the forest, the major streams are Rock Creek, Mad Creek, Snake Creek, Sardine Creek, and Stout Creek, which all flow into the North Santiam River. Major streams in the north are Butte Creek, Abiqua Creek, Cedar Creek, and Silver Creek. These creeks all flow into the Pudding River. In addition, Gawley Creek flows into the Molalla River.

The Santiam State Forest contains a few scattered wetlands, all smaller than 10 acres (40,000 m^{2}). There are four high elevation lakes located within the Butte Creek Basin. These lakes provide important wildlife habitat, but are also popular recreation sites.

== Wildlife ==
The forests of northwest Oregon provide habitat for hundreds of species of fish and wildlife. A total of 270 species including 63 mammals, 147 birds, 32 amphibians and reptiles, and 28 fish species are known to live in or near state forest lands. Many of these species have ranges that include the Santiam State Forest.

The Santiam State Forest is home to large, healthy populations of deer, elk, cougar, and bear. The North Cascade District conducts an annual spotted owl survey in the Santiam State Forest to monitor the owl population and habitat. The results of the survey show a small, but stable population of spotted owls are located within the forest.

There are 63 miles (101 km) of fish bearing streams located on the Santiam State Forest with an additional 78 miles (126 km) of streams that have not yet been classified. The North Cascade District is currently conducting fish presence surveys in order to classify the remaining streams. Completed stream inventories show the presence of both rainbow and coastal cutthroat trout. The lower reaches of Rock Creek, Mad Creek, and Stout Creek also support populations of wild winter steelhead.

== Forest management ==
North Cascade District operates under a forest management plan that included timber harvesting at a rate of 2,000 acres (8.1 km^{2}) to 3,000 acres (12 km^{2}) per year. Clear cut harvesting is limited to 200 acres (0.81 km^{2}) per year. Two important factors that influence the timber harvest are restrictions for spotted owl habitat and the emerging market for smaller-diameter saw-logs and veneer material.

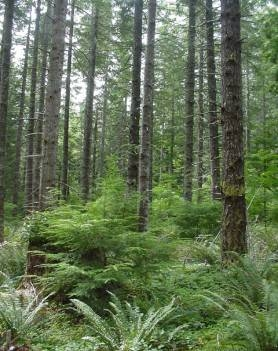
Even-aged conifer stand typical of Santiam area

Douglas-fir is the primary tree species in the Santiam State Forest. In some areas, the Douglas-fir stands are mixed with western hemlock, western red cedar, red alder, and bigleaf maple. A few Pacific yew can also be found at the lower elevations. Mountain hemlock, noble fir, silver fir, and western white pine are found in the higher elevations. Douglas-fir areas that have been recently cut and reforested are characterized by even-aged layers of seedlings or saplings. Stands cut more than 15 years ago have grown into closed canopy stands. These areas have a dense, even-aged layer of rapidly growing Douglas fir trees. The forest also has some older stands that naturally regenerated prior to the establishment of the state forest. These areas are typically mixed conifer stands that include Douglas-fir, hemlock, western red cedar, and noble fir. The forest has only a few layered stands, approximately 8,500 acres (34 km^{2}). These are the result of a selective cutting program during the 1970s and 1980s. These stands normally have an over-story of large Douglas-fir trees. There are ten separate patches of old-growth forest, totaling 380 acres (1.5 km^{2}). These stands range in age from 120 to 500 years.

The Santiam State Forest has seven management basins delineated by major stream drainage areas and related land forms. The Butte Creek Basin has 10,074 acres (40.77 km^{2}), and is located southeast of Silverton. The Cedar Creek Basin has 4,229 acres (17.11 km^{2}), and is northeast of Silver Falls State Park. The Crabtree Basin has 1,890 acres (7.6 km^{2}), and is located east of Lebanon, Oregon. The Green Basin has 6,905 acres (27.94 km^{2}), and is northeast of Gates. The Mad Creek Basin has 6,737 acres (27.26 km^{2}), and is located southeast of Mill City. The Rock Creek Basin has 12,603 acres (51.00 km^{2}), and is located south of Mill City adjacent to the Mad Creek Basin. There is also a forest unit designated as the Scattered Basin. That unit has 5,276 acres (21.35 km^{2}) located in scattered parcels throughout Clackamas, Marion, and Linn counties. These areas drain into the North Santiam River, South Santiam River, or the Pudding River.

== Recreation ==
Santiam State Forest is used for a wide range recreation activities including camping, hunting, fishing, mountain biking, and horseback riding. The forest has five campgrounds, a number of maintained day-use areas, and 21 miles (34 km) of hiking trails. One of the most popular sites is Shellburg Falls, located off Highway 22 near the town of Mehama. It has a quarter-mile hiking trail leading to the falls. It also has a one-half mile mountain bike trail constructed in 2006. Green Basin has two primitive hiking trails. One trail leads to the peak of Rocky Top Mountain where a fire lookout was once located. The other trail leads to a natural rock arch. Both of these trails are about one-half mile long. In the Butte Creek management area a short trail leads to Butte Creek Falls. The North Cascade District posts hiking information on kiosks at all the trailheads.

Oregon State Police troopers conduct vehicle patrols and provide law enforcement on the Santiam State Forest lands. Patrols enforce fish and wildlife, trespass, vandalism, and other state laws as well as fire regulations. Department of Forestry officers also patrol recreation areas and provide visitor assistance during high use periods.
