= Lower Shellburg Falls =

Waterfall in Santiam State Forest, Oregon

- Lower Shellburg Falls
- Interactive map of Lower Shellburg Falls
- Location: Santiam State Forest
- Coordinates: 44.81006°N 122.60829°W
- Type: Tiered Plunges
- Elevation: 1,225 ft (373 m)
- Total height: 40 ft (12 m)
- Number of drops: 2
- Average flow rate: 20 cu ft/s (0.6 m^{3}/s)

Lower Shellburg Falls is located in Santiam State Forest, Oregon, United States.The Waterfall is 40 feet tall. It is located near two other waterfalls: Shellburg Falls and Stasel Falls. Shellburg Creek supplies the waterfall.
