= Butte Creek Falls =

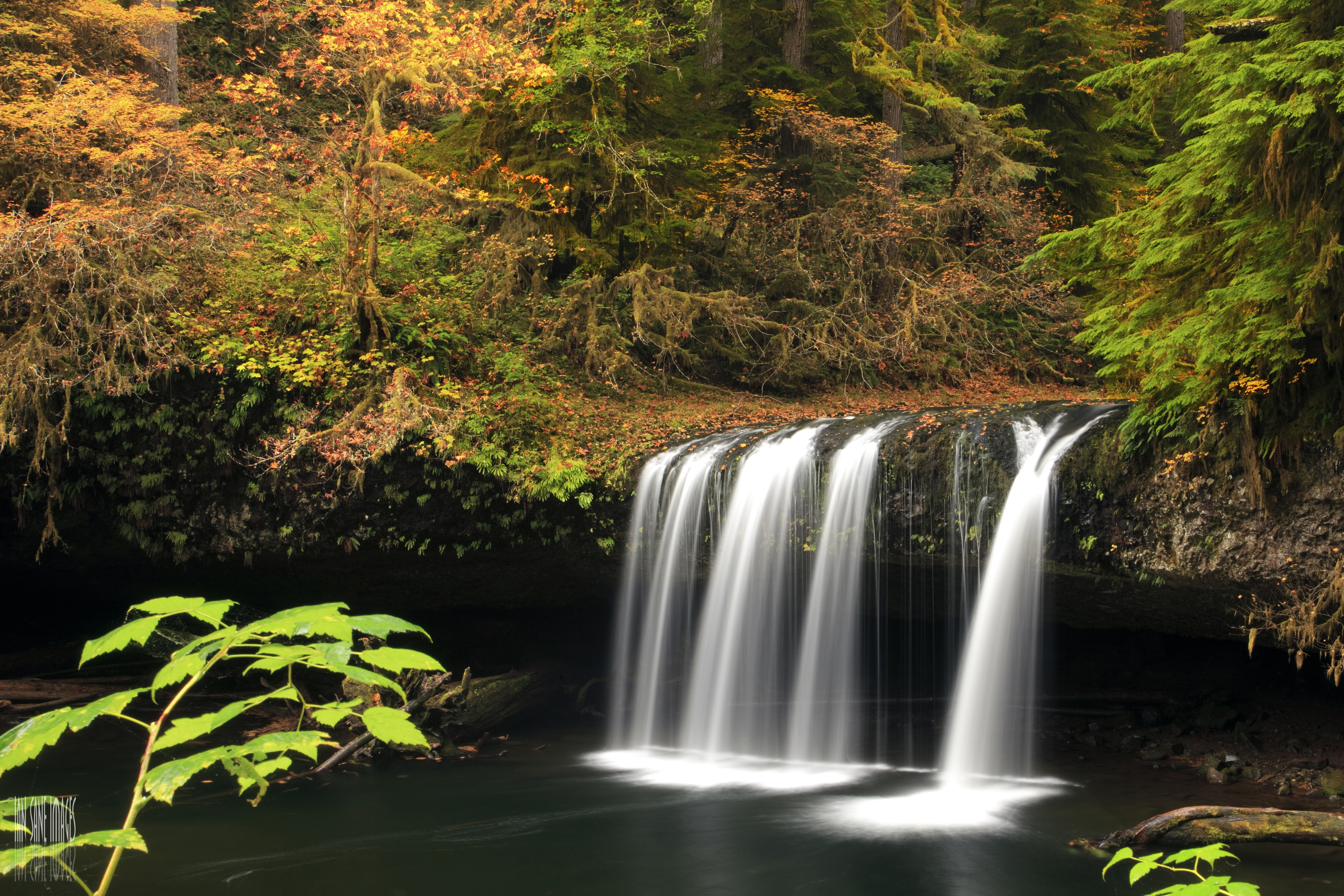
- Upper Butte Creek Falls
- Interactive map of Butte Creek Falls
- Location: Butte Creek
- Coordinates: 44.92389°N 122.51222°W
- Type: Curtain
- Elevation: 1,771 ft (540 m)
- Total height: 78 ft (24 m)
- Average flow rate: 150 cu ft/s (4.2 m^{3}/s)

Butte Creek Falls, is a waterfall located on the south east of Scotts Mills, in Marion County, in the U.S. state of Oregon. It totals 78 feet fall in one wide cascade and is the centerpiece attraction of the Butte Creek Falls trailhead and Recreation Site.

== See also ==
- List of waterfalls
- List of waterfalls in Oregon
