= Upper Butte Creek Falls =

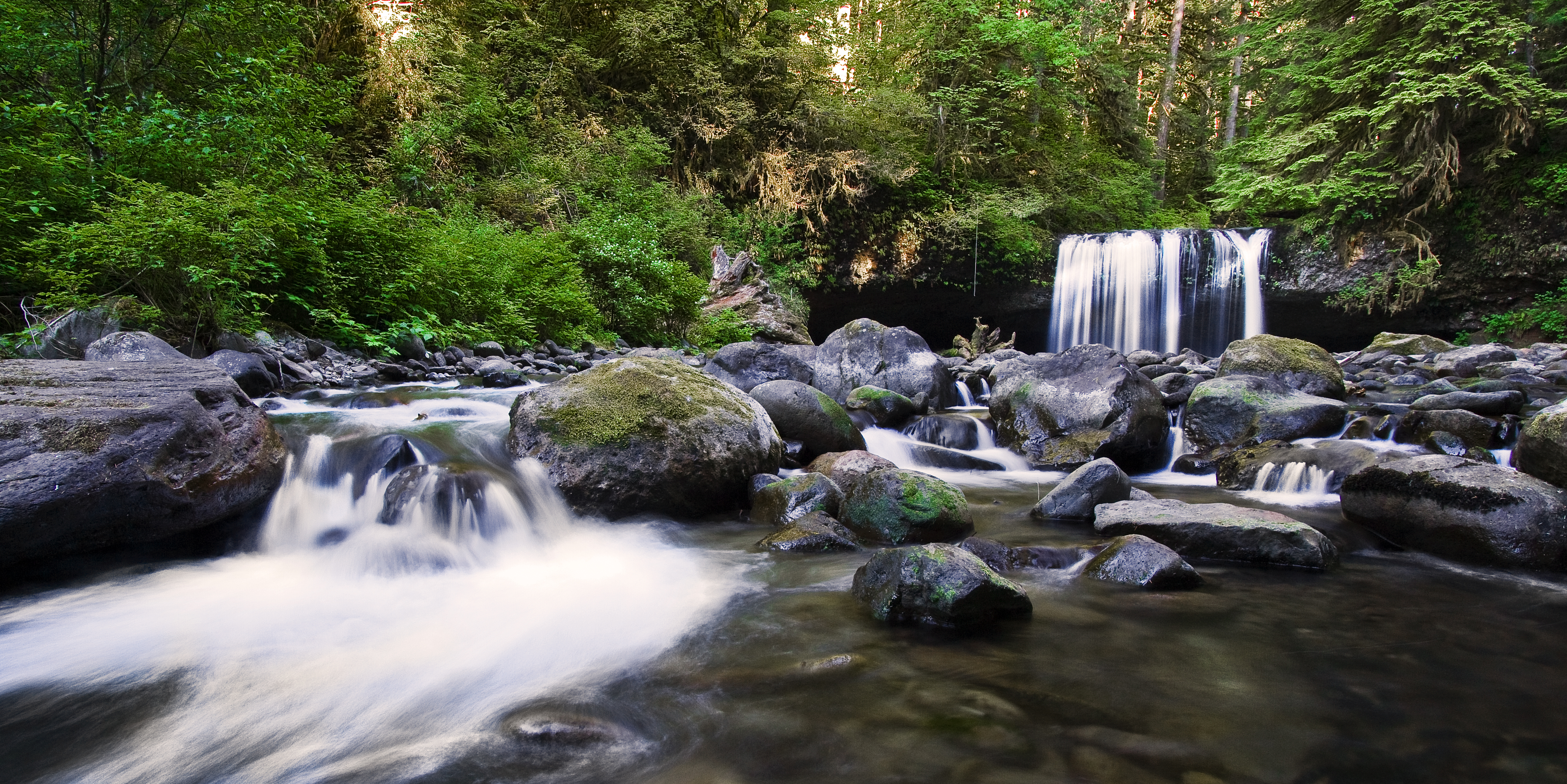
- Upper Butte Creek Falls in July
- Interactive map of Upper Butte Creek Falls
- Location: Butte Creek
- Coordinates: 44.92308°N 122.51167°W
- Type: Plunge
- Elevation: 1,827 ft (557 m)
- Total height: 26 ft (7.9 m)
- Average flow rate: 150 cu ft/s (4.2 m^{3}/s)

Upper Butte Creek Falls, is a waterfall located in the south edge of the Table Rock Wilderness at the east end of the city of Salem, in Marion County, in the U.S. state of Oregon. It is located in a privileged area on the east foothills of Drake Crossing. Several prominent rivers and waterfalls are located in the Butte Creek Falls trail system.

== Trails ==
A paved foot trail loops through mixed forest stands that starts at the trailhead and totals approximately 1 mile of easy hiking.

== See also ==
- List of waterfalls in Oregon
