= Butte Creek (Oregon) =

Stream in Oregon, United States of America

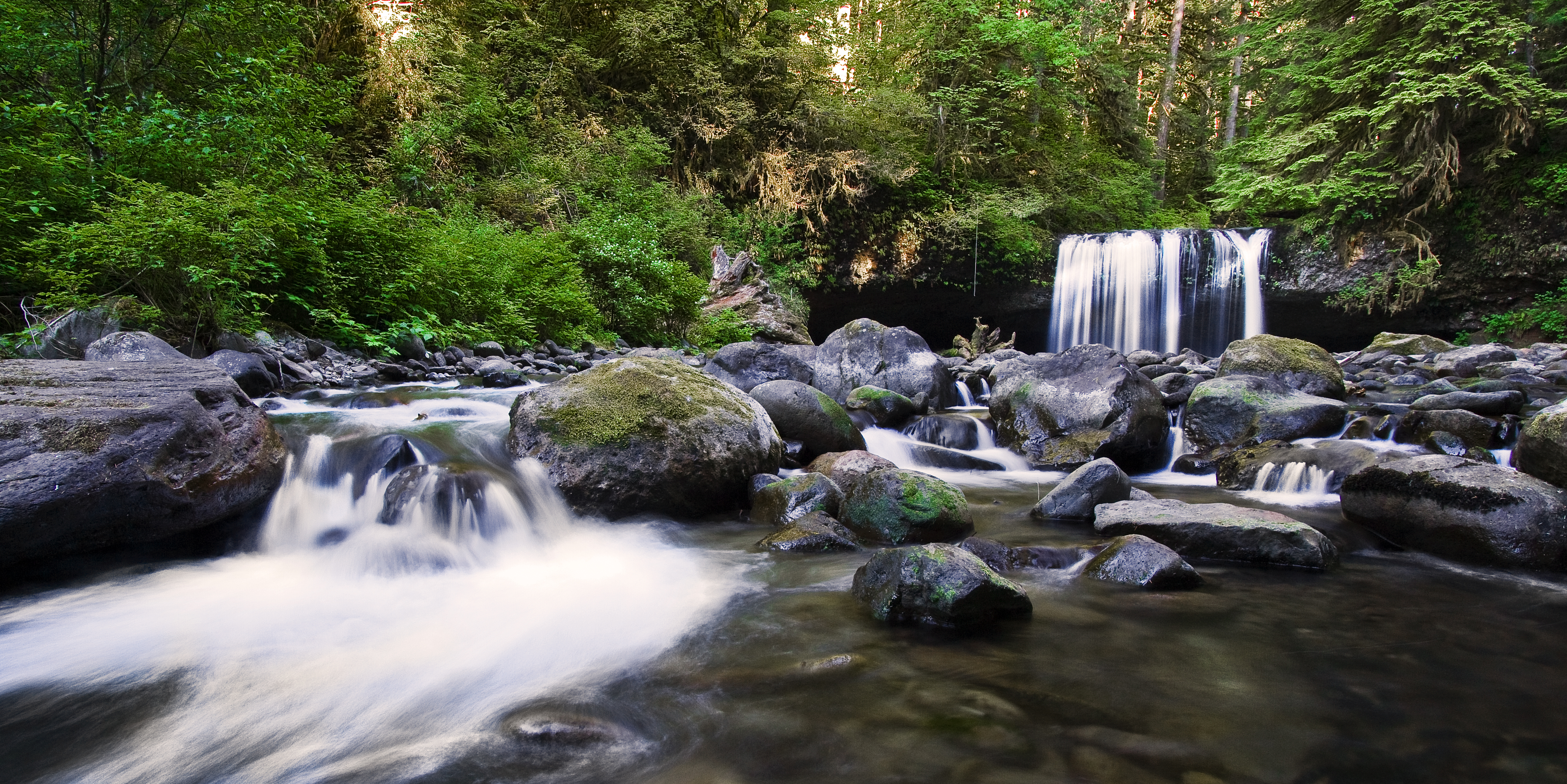
- Upper Butte Creek Falls

- Location of the mouth of Butte Creek in Oregon
- Etymology: Probably for Graves Butte, also known as Lone Tree Butte and, later, Mount Angel

Location
- Country: United States
- State: Oregon
- County: Marion, Clackamas

Physical characteristics
- Source: Cascade Range
  - location: Butte Basin, Santiam State Forest, Marion County, Oregon
  - coordinates: 44°53′06″N 122°23′55″W
  - elevation: 3,550 ft (1,080 m)
- Mouth: Pudding River
  - location: near Woodburn, Clackamas County, Oregon
  - coordinates: 45°09′38″N 122°46′23″W
  - elevation: 102 ft (31 m)
- Length: 33 mi (53 km)
- Basin size: 69 sq mi (180 km^{2})

Butte Creek is a stream in the U.S. state of Oregon, a tributary of the Pudding River. It is approximately 33 miles (53 km) long and, for all of its course, defines part of the northeastern boundary of Marion County and the southern boundary of Clackamas County.

== Course ==
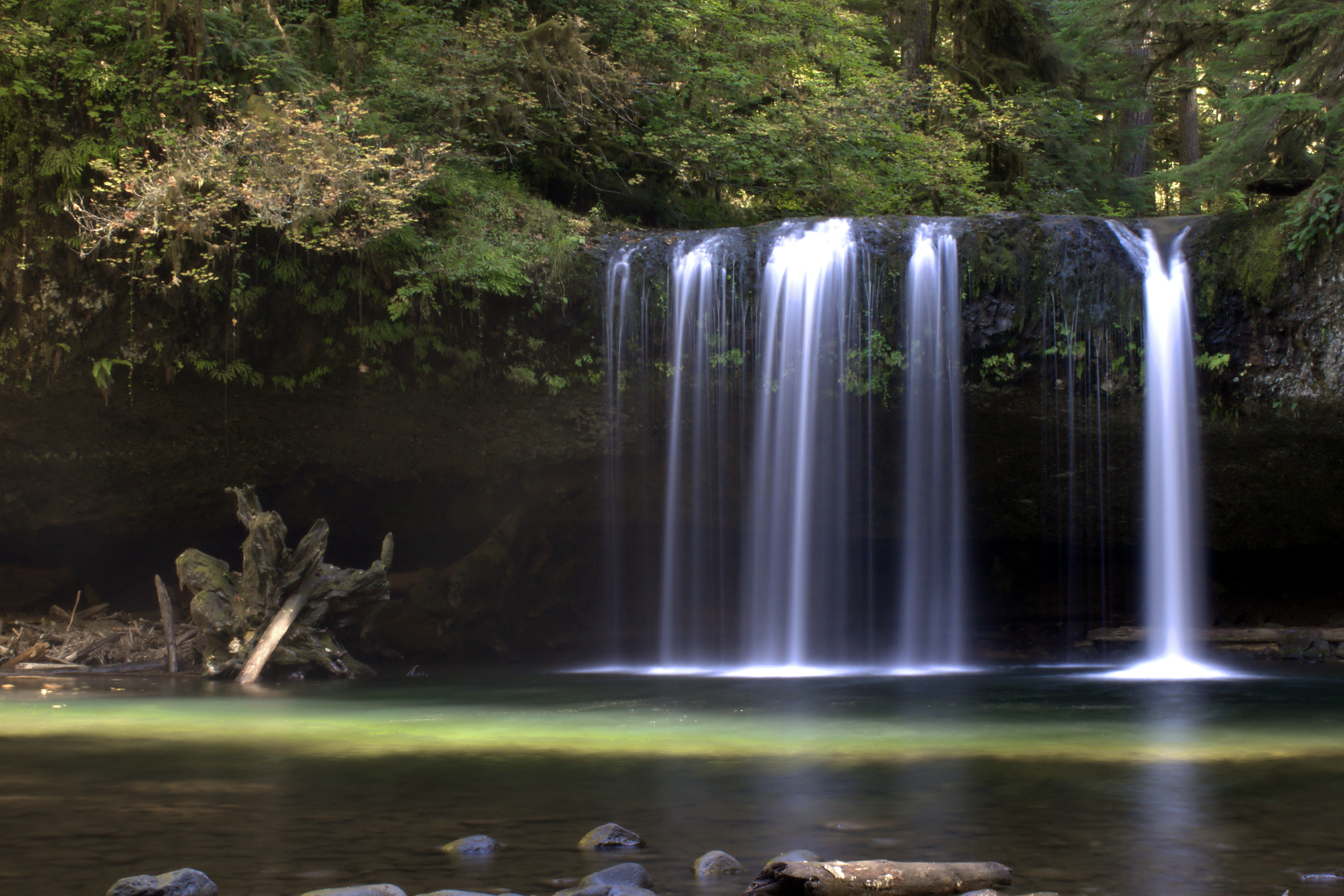
Butte Creek Falls

Originating from the Panther Rock Ridge, its source is a remote portion of the Cascade Range designated as Santiam State Forest in Butte Basin, about 8 miles (13 km) north of Gates. Butte Basin contains Copper Lake and Butte Lakes at elevation 3,533 feet (1,077 m). The stream meanders slightly northwest through steep mountainous and heavily forested terrain for about two-thirds of its length.

It receives Camp Creek from the right at river mile 32.9, then Fill Creek (right, RM 32.6). It turns due west for the next two miles (3 km) and parallels South Gawley Ridge to the north and receives Rhody Creek (left, RM 31.8) which drains Rhody Lake, then Fibre Creek (left, RM 31.3) which drains Fibre Lake. Shortly before resuming a northwesterly course, it receives South Fork (left, RM 30.7). At river mile 29.3 it receives a short unnamed creek from the right at about elevation 2,450 feet (750 m). Butte Creek turns WSW for about a mile where it receives a two-mile (3 km) long unnamed creek from the left (RM 27.2), Kirk Creek (left, RM 26.8), then turns directly northwest. About a half mile later it drops over Butte Creek Falls, elevation 1,900 feet (580 m).

Over the next mile, it receives three small creeks all from the right including Looney Creek (RM 25.8). It passes over a gravel bar, then receives three small creeks in succession from the left in a fairly steep forest canyon. Afterward, the canyon widens somewhat, and a small creek which drains an agricultural plateau to the west enters from the left at RM 24.8, followed by Fall Creek (right, RM 23.9) where the canyon becomes a gentle valley. Between RM 20 and 21.3, the creek passes over a succession of sand or gravel bars, and at RM 19.5, the creek turns northward—except for a few small zigzags—for the next 4.5 miles (7.2 km). It receives Coal Creek (right, RM 17.5) by which time the creek is surrounded by moderately gentle, 1,000-foot (300 m) hills.

Unnamed creeks enter at RM 16.6 (right), RM 16.3 (left), RM 16.1 (right), RM 15.9 (left), 15.7 (left), 15.6 (right), and 14.8 (right). By this point, the designated state forest is sparse islands and most of the land is agricultural or private forest. An unnamed creek (possibly named Crooked Finger Creek for a road which parallels it) enters at RM 13.2 (left) in an impoundment formed by a dam just east of Scotts Mills.

Unnamed creeks enter at RM 10.8 (left) and RM 10.3 (left) near Jacks Bridge which carries Oregon Route 213 across Butte Creek at RM 10.2 and elevation 300 feet (91 m). For the rest of its course, the creek meanders gently in mild rolling terrain which has hills less than about 200 feet (61 m) high. A river gaging station in Monitor is at RM 5.9. An unnamed creek enters from the right at RM 5.4, and the outlet of two reservoirs southeast of Woodburn is carried by an aqueduct entering from the left at RM 2.8. Oregon Route 211 crosses at approximately RM 1.5. Butte Creek enters the Pudding River at the latter's RM 20.1. The Marion/Clackamas County line follows the Pudding River downstream until Arndt Road.

The mouth is about 6 miles (9.7 km) north of Mt. Angel and 3 miles (4.8 km) east of Woodburn at 45.160768°N 122.773569°W.

== See also ==
- List of rivers of Oregon
- List of waterfalls in Oregon
- Butte Creek Volcanic Sandstone
