= Gallon House Bridge =

Covered bridge in Oregon, US

- U.S. National Register of Historic Places
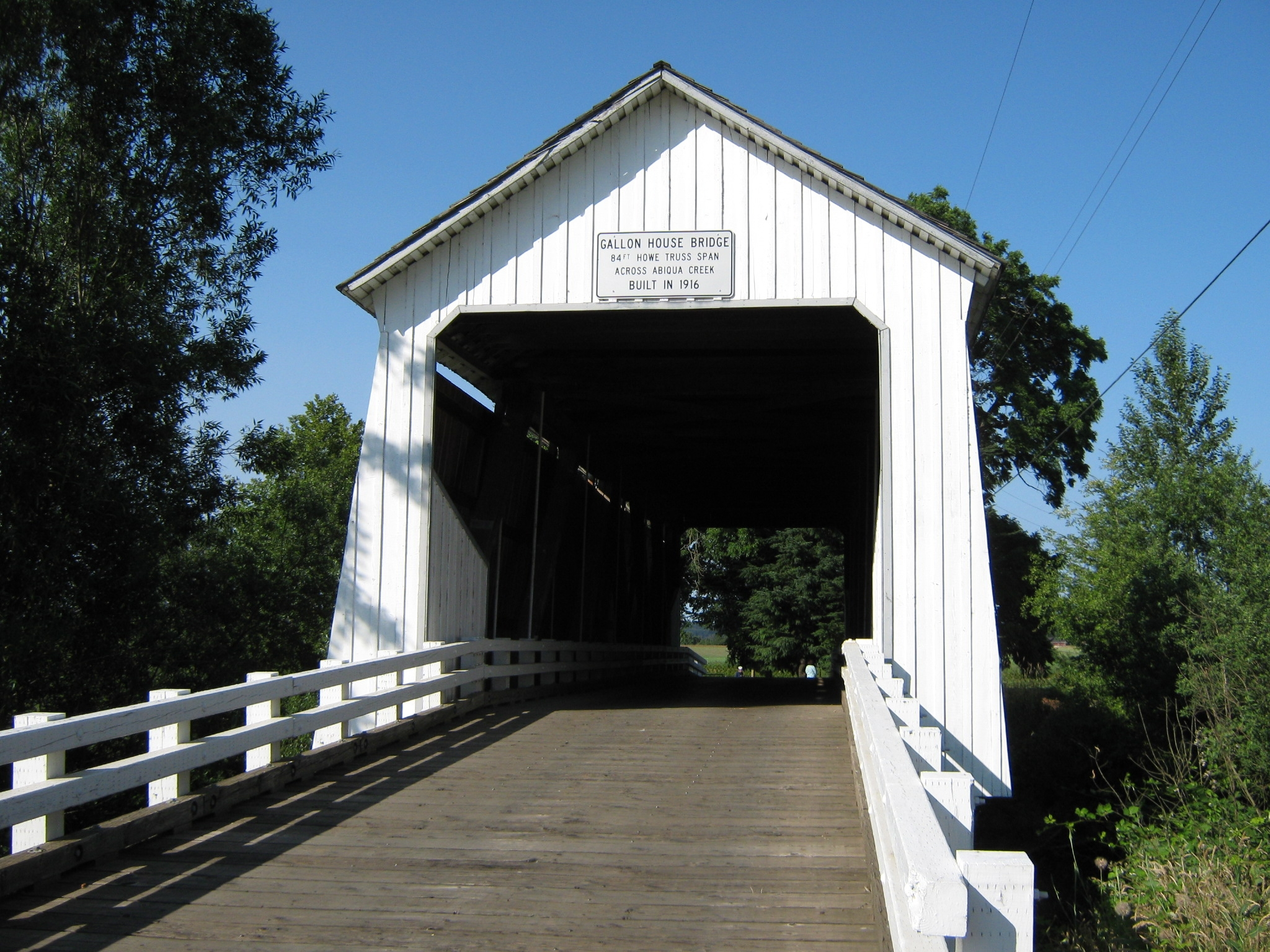
- Location: Silverton, Oregon vicinity
- Coordinates: 45.03215°N 122.79814°W
- NRHP reference No.: 79002124
- Added to NRHP: 1979

Gallon House Bridge (also Gallonhouse Bridge) is a wooden covered bridge spanning Abiqua Creek in rural Marion County, Oregon, United States, built in 1916. The 84-foot-long (26 m) bridge derived its name during prohibition when it was a meeting place for bootleggers and moonshiners. The bridge was swept off its footings in the December 1964 flood, but was restored immediately after. Gallon House Bridge is about 2 miles (3 km) north-northwest of the city of Silverton west of Oregon Route 214 on Gallon House Road.

== See also ==
- List of bridges documented by the Historic American Engineering Record in Oregon
- List of bridges on the National Register of Historic Places in Oregon
- List of Oregon covered bridges
