= Silver Creek (Marion County, Oregon) =

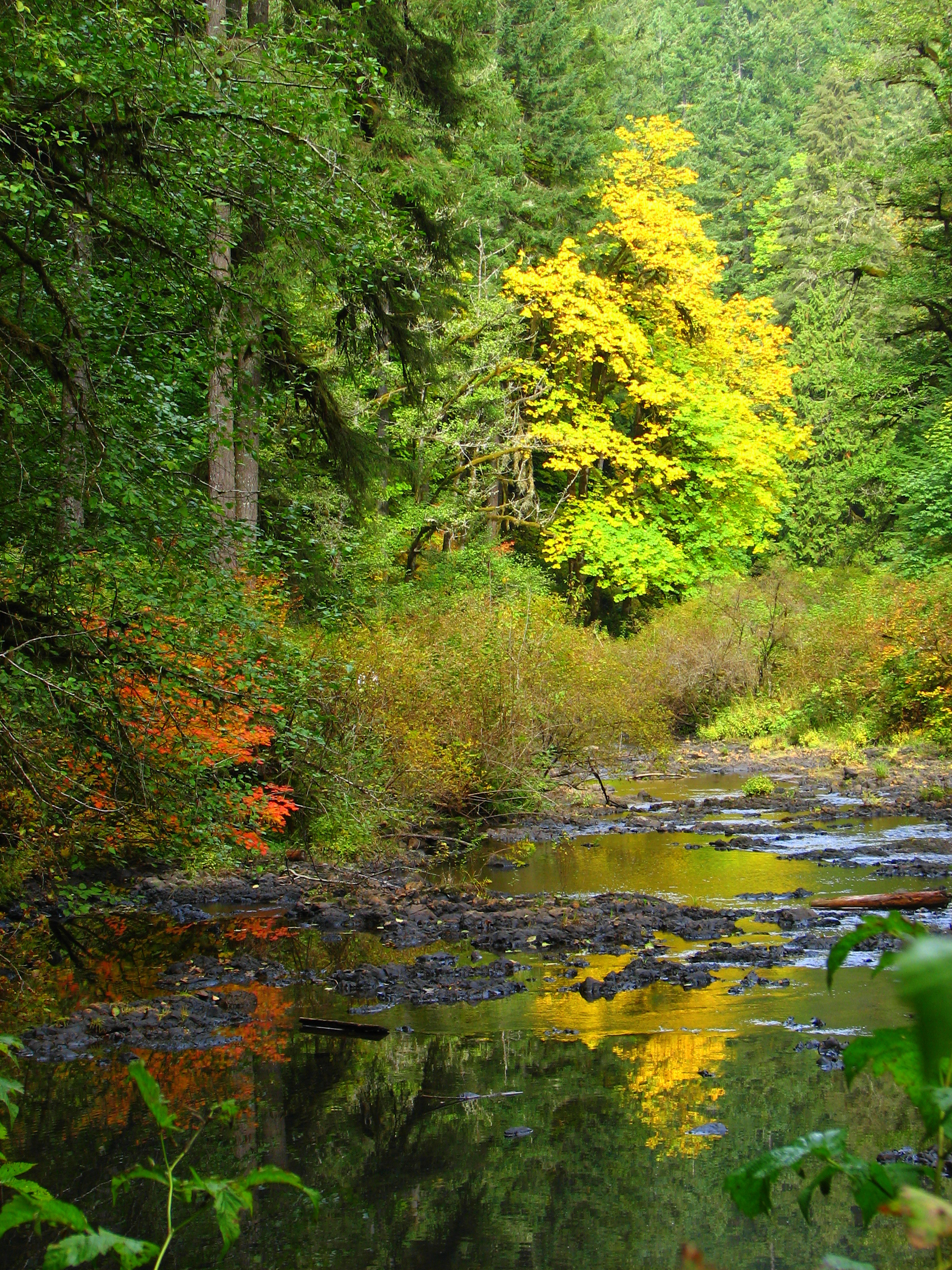
- Creek at Silver Falls State Park

- Location of Silver Creek in Marion County, Oregon

Location
- Country: United States
- State: Oregon
- County: Marion

Physical characteristics
- Source
  - location: Cascade Range foothills, Marion County, Oregon
  - coordinates: 44°53′20″N 122°39′47″W
  - elevation: 963 ft (294 m)
- Mouth: Pudding River
  - location: Silverton, Marion County, Oregon
  - coordinates: 45°00′01″N 122°50′27″W
  - elevation: 157 ft (48 m)
- Length: 16 mi (26 km)
- Basin size: 54.4 sq mi (141 km^{2})

Silver Creek is a stream, about 16 miles (26 km) long, in Marion County, Oregon, United States. It is a tributary of the Pudding River and originates in Silver Falls State Park in the Cascade foothills above the cities Silverton and Stayton.

== Course ==
Silver Creek originates in the northwestern part of Silver Falls State Park at the confluence of its North and South Forks. From there the stream flows 9.5 miles (15.3 km) north-northwest through Silver Creek Canyon and into the Silverton Reservoir. It continues out of the canyon from that point for 2.5 miles (4.0 km) and through the city of Silverton, running parallel to Oregon State Highway 214 until it veers due west at North Water Street in Silverton. It runs for another 3.2 miles (5.1 km) to its confluence with the Pudding River.

== See also ==
- List of rivers of Oregon
- Oregon Garden, which was designed, in part, to divert Silverton's sewage effluent from the creek.
