= Liberal, Oregon =

Unincorporated community in the state of Oregon, United States

Liberal
- Unincorporated community
- Location within the state of Oregon Liberal (the United States)
- Coordinates: 45°11′34″N 122°35′08″W
- Country: United States
- State: Oregon
- County: Clackamas
- Elevation: 253 ft (77 m)
- Time zone: UTC-8 (Pacific (PST))
  - Summer (DST): UTC-7 (PDT)
- ZIP code: 97038
- Area codes: 503 and 971
- GNIS feature ID: 1123065

Liberal is an unincorporated community in Clackamas County, Oregon, United States. It lies on Oregon Route 213 between Mulino and Molalla.

The community of Liberal grew up three miles south of Mulino on the south side of the Molalla River. The Liberal crossroads is located at the mutual corners of the donation land claims established in the 1840s by Harrison Wright, William Russell, W. D. Woodcock, James Barnard and Francis Jackson. As the original land claims began to be parceled out, the area was settled in the mid-19th century, primarily by Swiss and German families.

According to local tradition, the community was named after the "liberal" credit practices of the founder of the Liberal Store.

Liberal currently includes the historic Liberal Store, an active sawmill, a chicken feed mill, a multi-generational family farm, and the Evangelical Community Chapel, a church that has continuously held weekly meetings since its founding in 1900.

== Economy ==
The largest employer in Liberal is the RSG Sawmill, a division of the privately held Kalama, Washington-based, RSG Forest Products, Inc. The community's second largest employer is the Victory Seed Company, which operates on the Dunton Family Farm. Satrum-Dybvad Milling, a chicken feed mill, supplies Willamette Egg Farms.
