= Ogle Creek =

- Location of Ogle Creek mouth in Oregon
- Etymology: Bob Ogle, a prospector from Molalla

Location
- Country: United States
- State: Oregon
- County: Marion, Clackamas

Physical characteristics
- Source: Cascade Range
  - location: near Ogle Mountain
  - coordinates: 44°53′08″N 122°20′10″W
  - elevation: 3,081 ft (939 m)
- Mouth: Molalla River
  - location: river mile 46 (km 74) on the Molalla, Clackamas County
  - coordinates: 44°54′52″N 122°19′51″W
  - elevation: 1,847 ft (563 m)

Ogle Creek is a headwaters tributary, about 2 miles (3 km) long, of the Molalla River in the northwestern part of Oregon in the United States. From its source in the Cascade Range, it flows north from far-northern Marion County into Clackamas County near Ogle Mountain. From there it continues north into the river about 46 miles (74 km) above its confluence with the Willamette River.

Ogle Creek was named for Bob Ogle, a Molalla prospector who found gold along the creek in 1862. An Oregon City Mining Company employee had found placer gold along the upper Molalla in 1860. Over the next 40 years, many others filed mining claims in the Molalla watershed. The biggest claimant, the Ogle Mountain Mining Company, operated the Ogle Mountain Mine between 1903 and 1915. Limited mining continued here until 1953, when Weyerhaeuser bought the land for timber.

== See also ==
- List of rivers of Oregon
