= Molalla River State Park =

State park in Oregon, United States

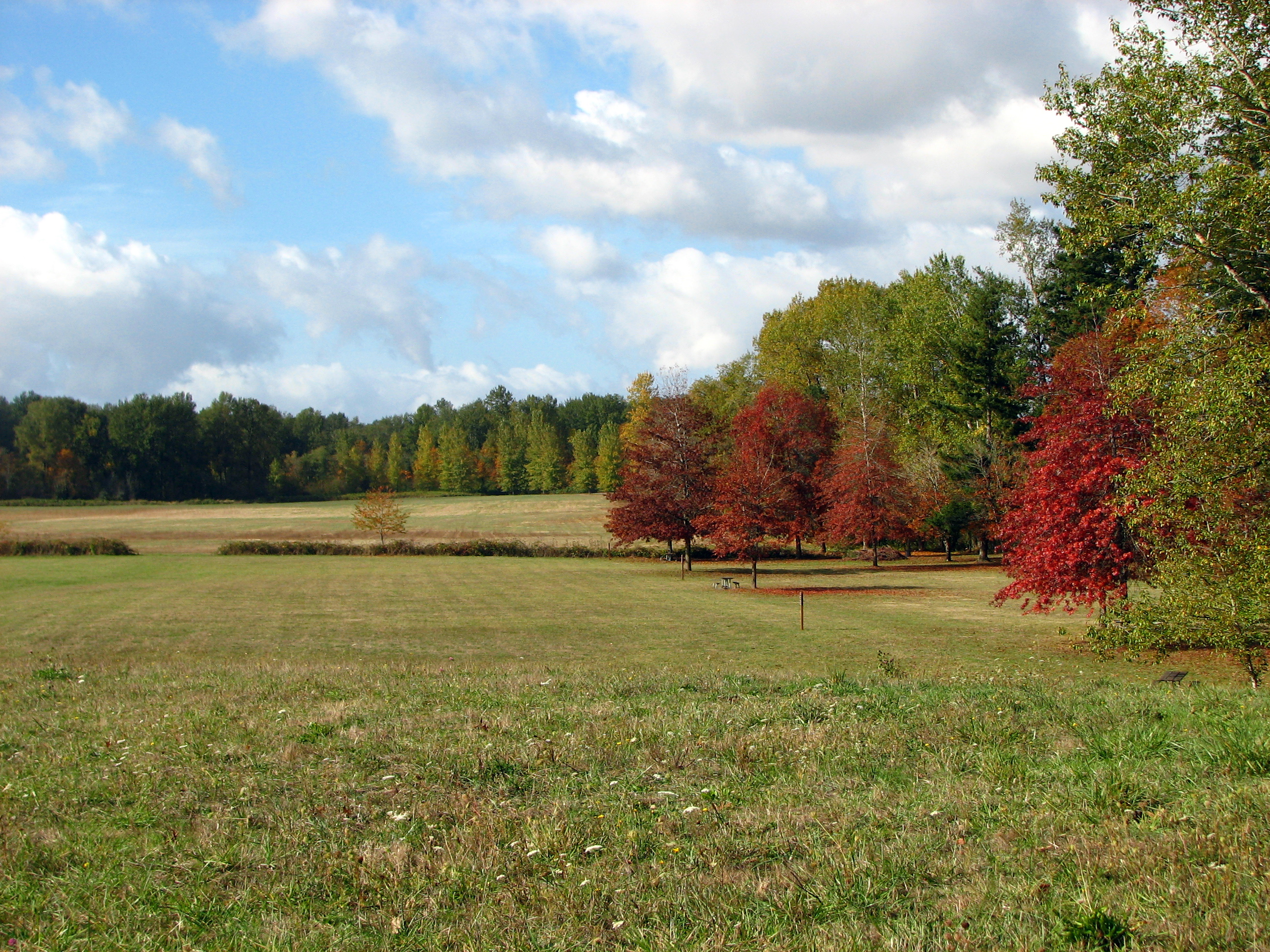
- Grassy meadow along the walking trail

- Location within Oregon Location within the United States
- Type: Public, state
- Location: Clackamas County, Oregon
- Nearest city: Canby
- Coordinates: 45°17′44″N 122°42′09″W
- Area: 567 acres (229 ha)
- Operator: Oregon Parks and Recreation Department
- Status: Day use only, year-round

The Molalla River State Park is located in U.S. state of Oregon. It is a few miles north of Canby, and half a mile from the Canby Ferry. The park is south of the Willamette River and east of the Molalla River, at the confluence of the Pudding, Molalla and Willamette rivers. The Pudding River flows into the Molalla from the west, just before the Molalla joins the Willamette. The floodplains of these rivers provide important habitat for waterfowl, wading birds, deer, small mammals, reptiles and amphibians. A blue heron rookery, one of the largest in the Willamette Valley, is located in Molalla River State Park.

== Gallery ==
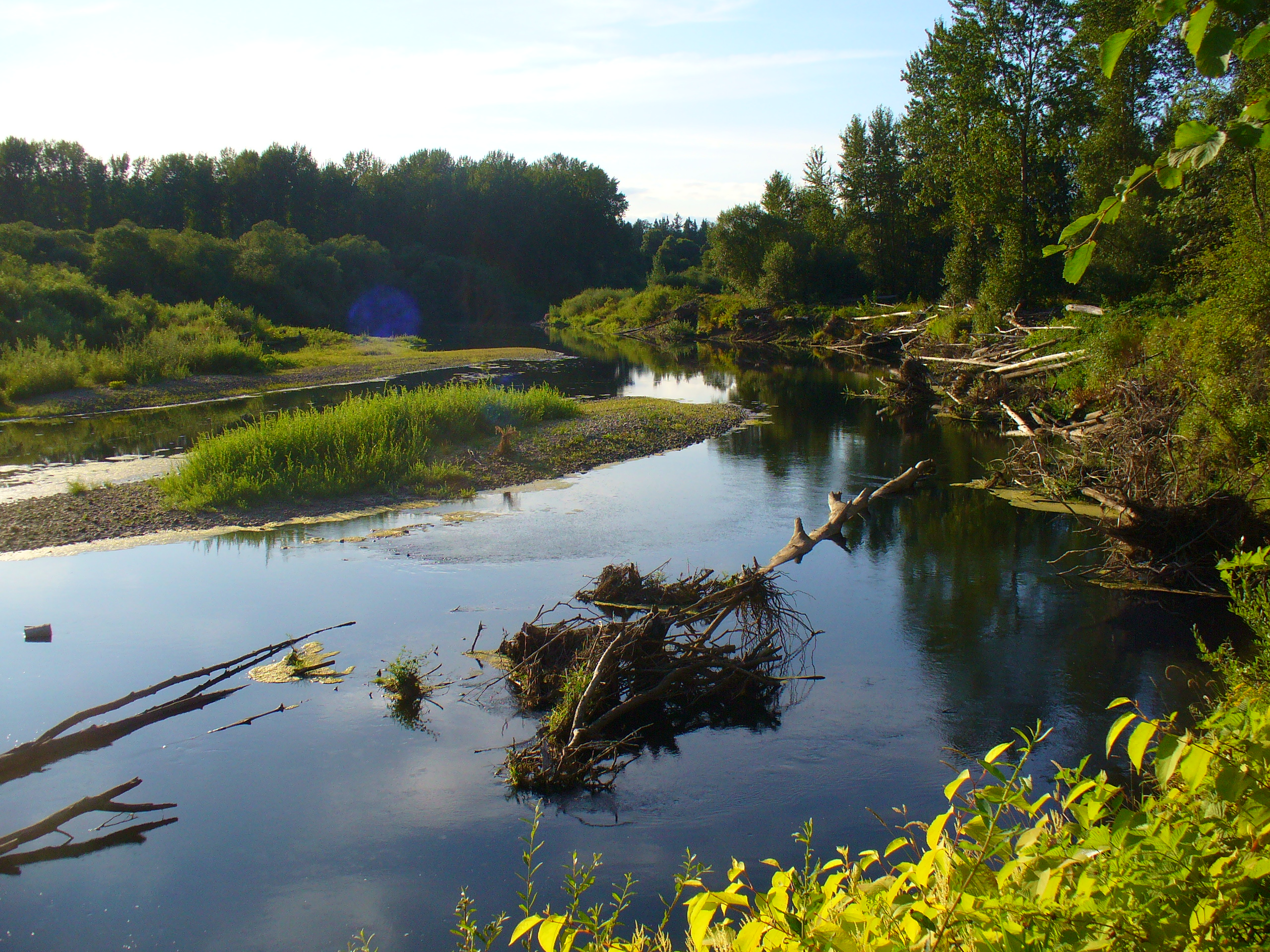
View of Molalla River from the walking trail

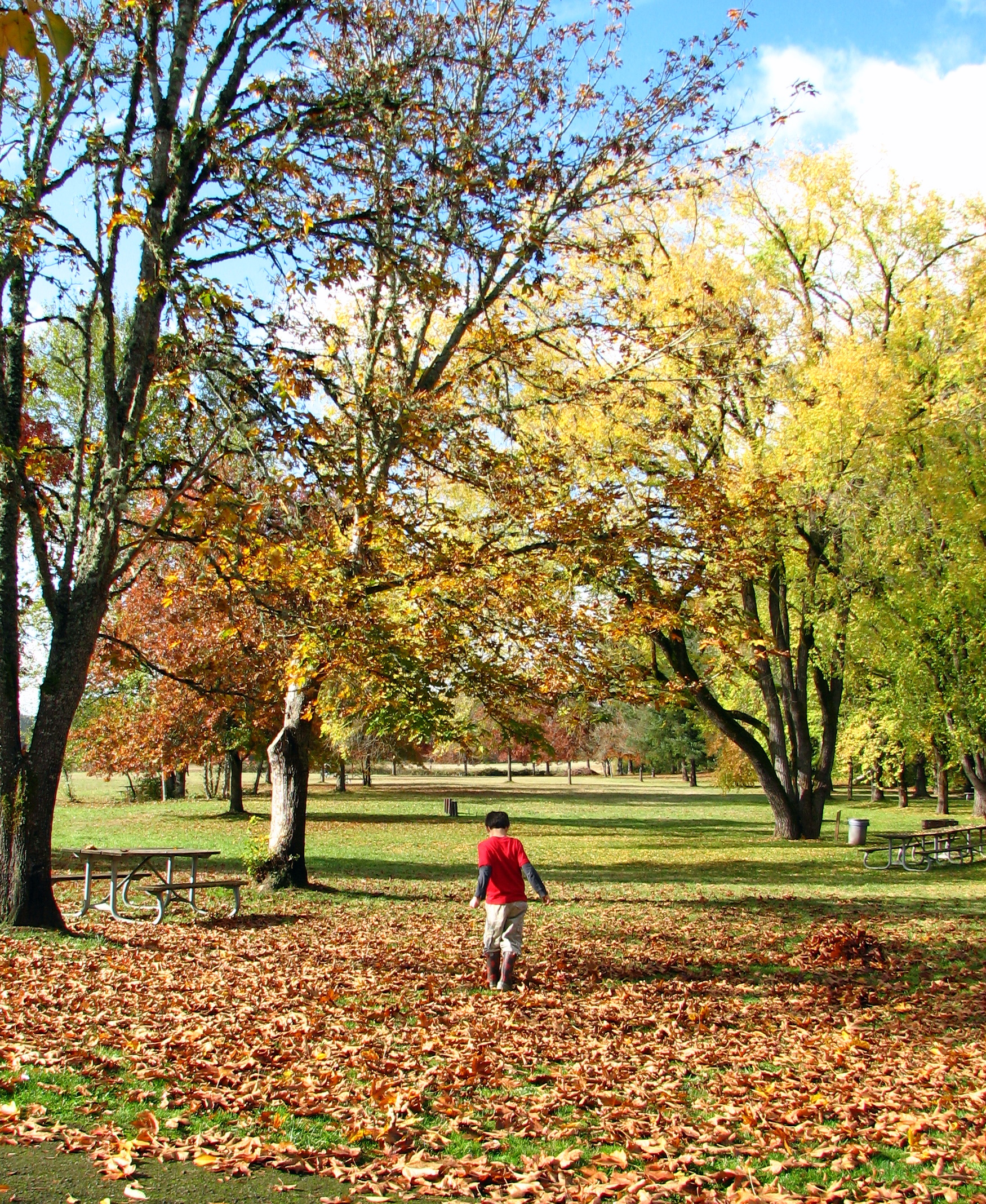
Playing in the autumn leaves

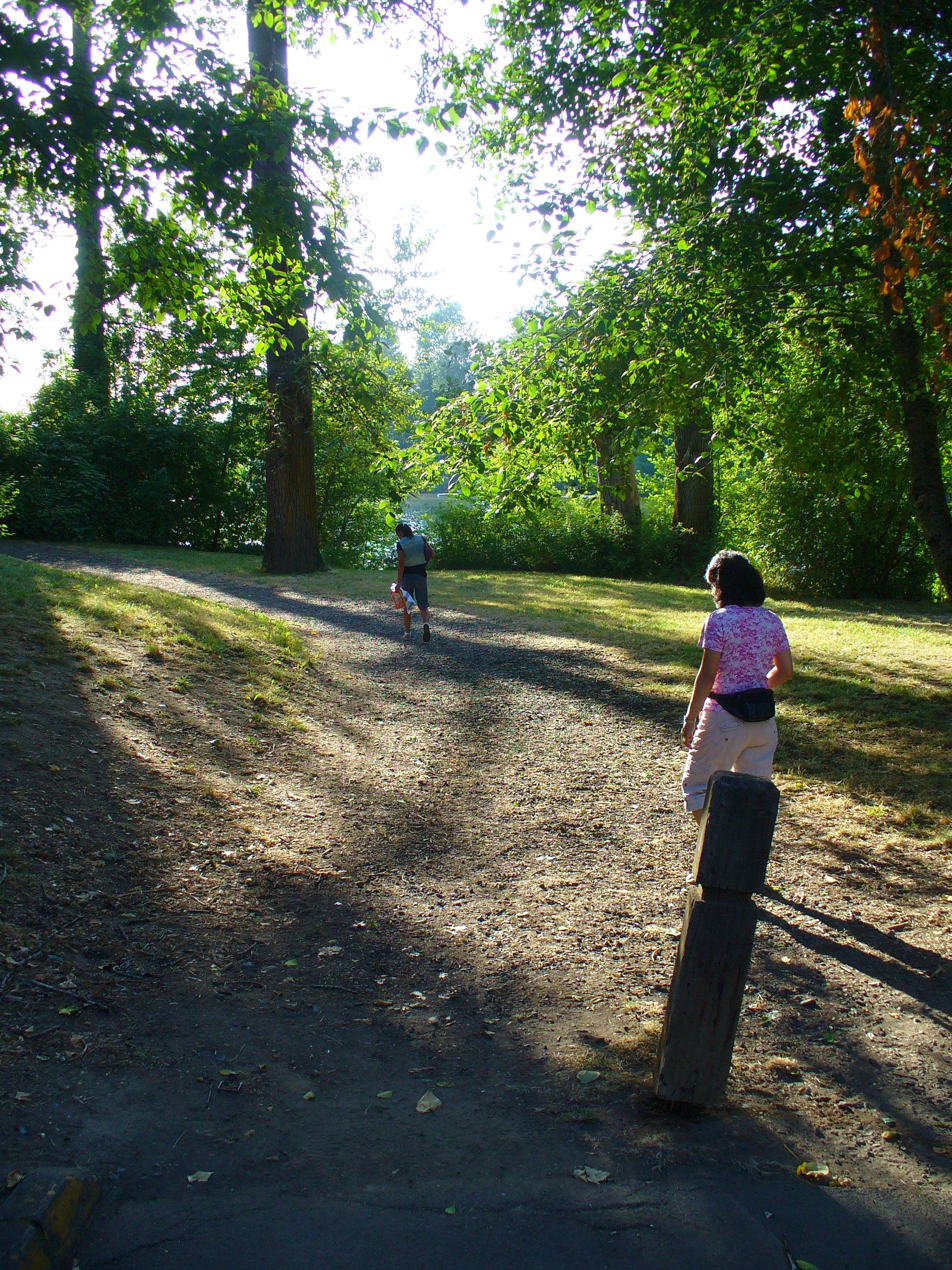
Beginning of the walking trail, at parking lot

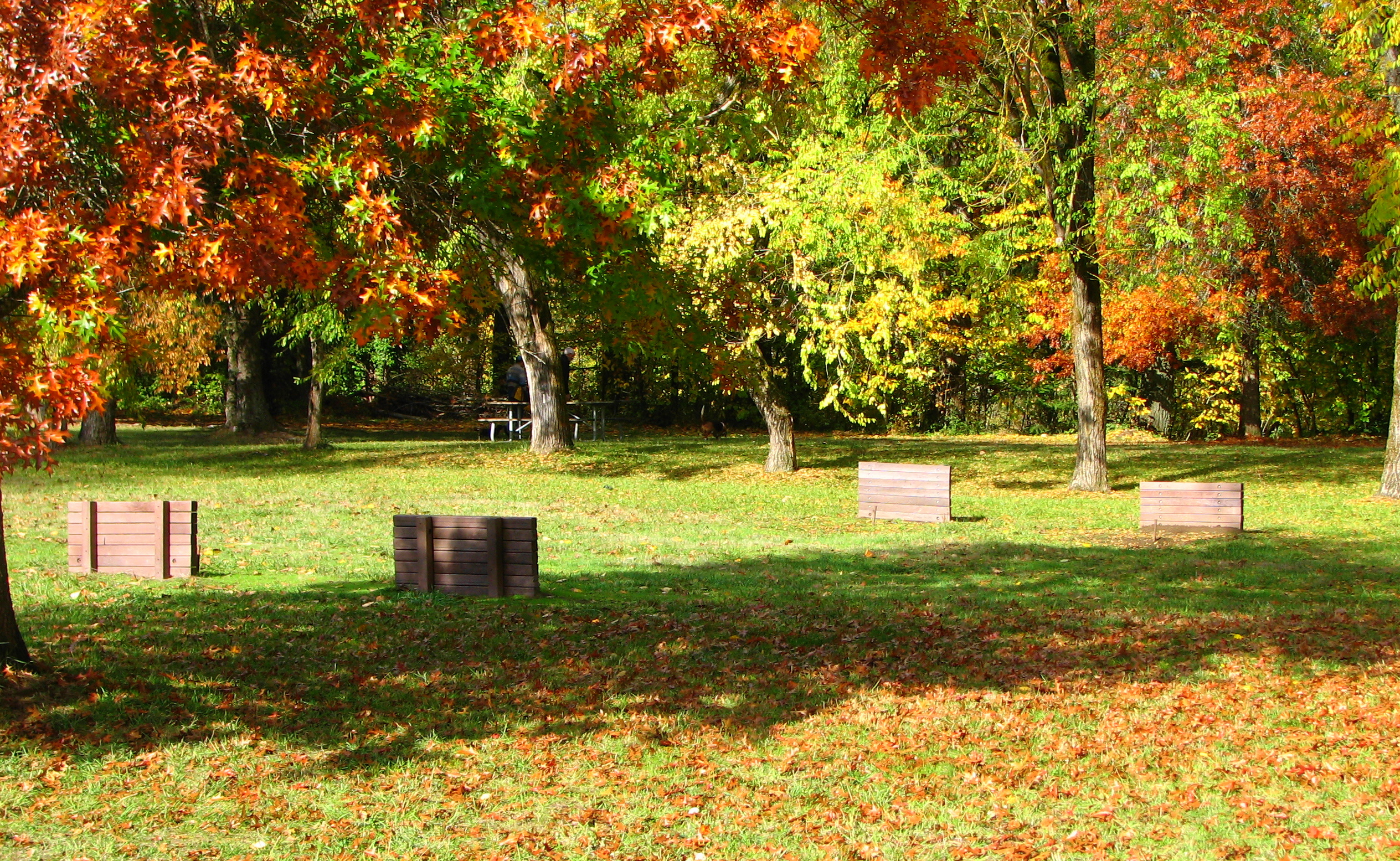
Horseshoe pits

== See also ==
- List of Oregon state parks
- List of rivers in Oregon
