= Pudding River =

River in Clackamas and Marion counties in Oregon, United States

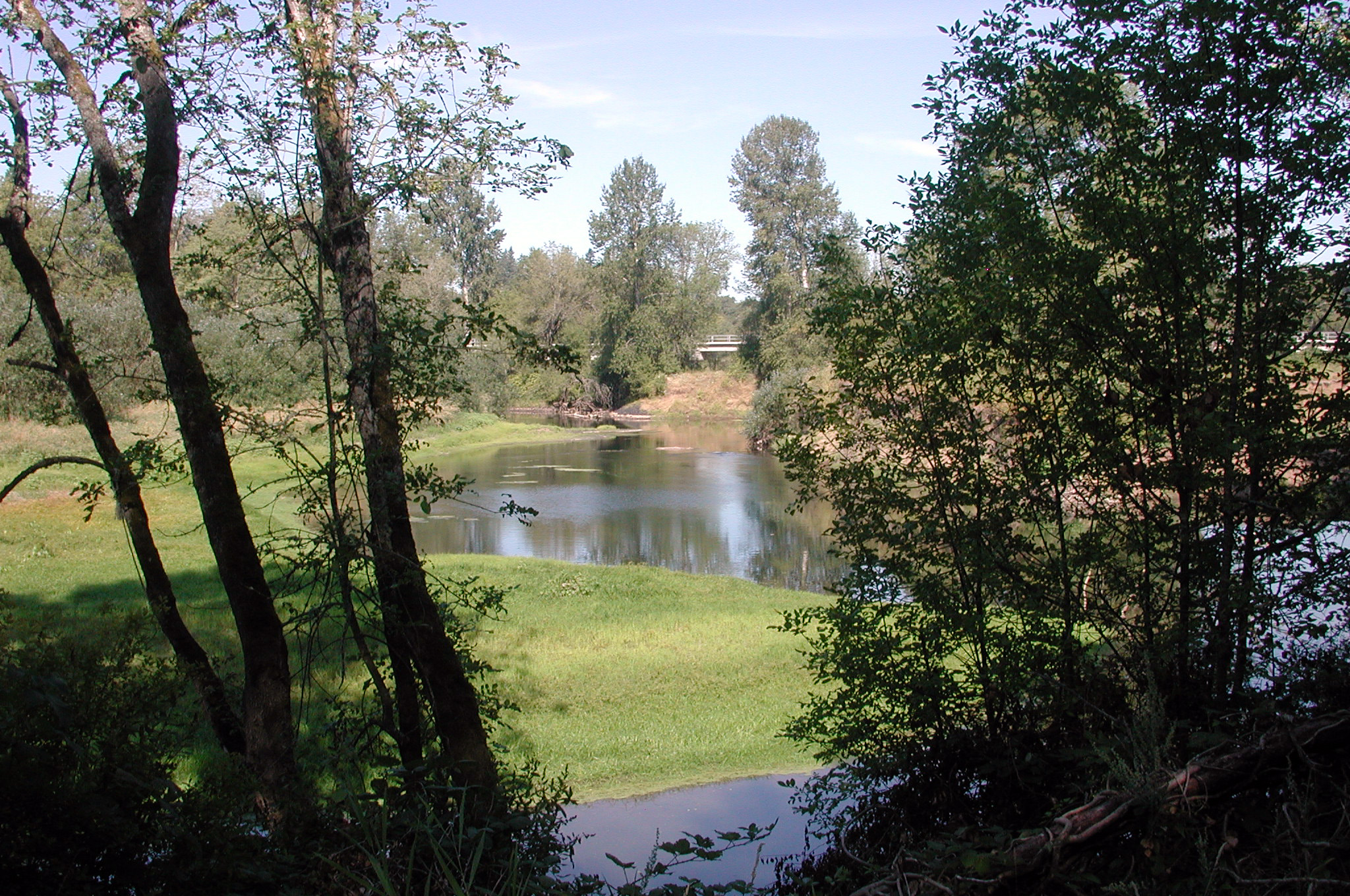
- Pudding River near Aurora, August 2009

- Location of the mouth of the Pudding River in Oregon
- Etymology: From Riviere au Boudin, given by French fur trappers in the early 19th-century to commemorate a blood pudding made from elk they shot near the river

Location
- Country: United States
- State: Oregon
- County: Marion, Clackamas

Physical characteristics
- Source: Waldo Hills
  - location: east of Salem, Marion County
  - coordinates: 44°53′51″N 122°44′42″W
  - elevation: 953 ft (290 m)
- Mouth: Molalla River
  - location: near Canby, Clackamas County
  - coordinates: 45°17′54″N 122°43′07″W
  - elevation: 69 ft (21 m)
- Length: 62 mi (100 km)
- Basin size: 528 sq mi (1,370 km^{2})
- Discharge
  - location: Aurora, 8.11 miles (13.05 km) from the mouth
  - average: 1,237 cu ft/s (35.0 m^{3}/s)
  - minimum: 3.5 cu ft/s (0.099 m^{3}/s)
  - maximum: 43,700 cu ft/s (1,240 m^{3}/s)

The Pudding River is a 62-mile (100 km) tributary of the Molalla River in Clackamas and Marion counties in Oregon, United States. Its drainage basin covers 528 square miles (1,368 km^{2}). Among its tributaries are Silver Creek, Butte Creek, Abiqua Creek, and the Little Pudding River.

Historically, the Pudding River flowed directly into the Willamette River, and aerial photos dating back to 1936 provide evidence of the Willamette River's confluence with the Pudding River mainstem channel. Currently, it flows directly into the Molalla River near River Mile 1 before joining the Willamette River. Anadromous and resident salmonids use the Lower Pudding River main stem and key tributaries that support the basin's ecosystems.

== Geology ==
About 24 million years ago at the end of the Oligocene, Oregon had started to look how it is today and the Willamette Bay finally became the Willamette Valley by drying up and being raised above sea level, after assuming a shape much like today's Puget Sound.

== Course ==
The Pudding River Basin's complex of headwater creeks originates from the western edge of the Cascade Mountains along a snowpack-limited ridgeline (i.e. no glaciers are present) that forms a critical linkage from the Mount Hood National Forest and Table Rock Wilderness to Silver Falls State Park and the rolling Waldo Hills east of Salem. Peak ridgeline elevations vary from 3,750 to 4,250 feet (1,140 to 1,300 m). After emerging from the Cascade Mountain foothills of the Panther Rock Ridge and its unique forested upper-elevation wetlands and lakes, the key tributaries of the watershed like ecologically important Butte Creek converge near Woodburn into the meandering Pudding River. Passing through and within the Pudding River Valley, the numerous subwatersheds of the Pudding Basin represent a vital part of fertile agricultural lands of the Lower Willamette Valley sub-basin. Two forks of the Pudding join between the cities of Silverton and Mt. Angel, at 45.036368°N 122.833275°W, as the river continues its course northward where it receives Abiqua Creek from the right at about 2 miles (3.2 km) northwest of Silverton. North of Mt. Angel, Butte Creek, which comes down from the Cascade Range foothills past Scotts Mills, empties into the Pudding River at 45.160768°N 122.773569°W. The river continues northward past the town of Aurora. For most of its course, Butte Creek and the Lower Pudding River mainstem defines the boundary between Marion and Clackamas Counties.

The Pudding River flows into the Molalla River, at 45.282375°N 122.716856°W, just before the Molalla joins the Willamette River in a floodplain that is part of the Molalla River State Park.

== Fishing ==
The upper river offers catch-and-release fishing for wild trout, while the lower river has bass and panfish. Although the Pudding River is not stocked with hatchery fish, coastal cutthroat trout and rainbow trout enter the upper main stem from Drift, Butte, Silver, and Abiqua creeks. Fishing is restricted to artificial flies and lures and is not allowed for winter-run steelhead (anadromous rainbow trout) that spawn in the tributaries. The extreme lower reaches of the river are navigable by boat when the stream flow is sufficient, sometimes as late as June.

== See also ==
- List of rivers of Oregon
- List of longest streams of Oregon
