= Silver Creek Reservoir =

Reservoir in Silverton, Oregon, United States

- Location within Oregon Location within the United States
- Location: Marion County, Oregon
- Coordinates: 44°58′59″N 122°44′46″W
- Type: Reservoir
- Primary inflows: Silver Creek
- Primary outflows: Silver Creek
- Basin countries: United States
- Surface area: 65 acres (26 ha)
- Surface elevation: 417 ft (127 m)

Silver Creek Reservoir also known as Silverton Reservoir is a 65-acre (26 ha) impoundment on Silver Creek located in the Cascade foothills 2.5 miles (4.0 km) southeast of the city of Silverton, Oregon, United States on Oregon Route 214. The reservoir serves the purpose of flood control on the creek.

The lake is popular in the spring and summer as a recreation area. Stocked with roughly 20,000 hatchery trout each spring and early summer, the lake also provides opportunities to catch bullhead catfish. Swimming is also quite popular on warm summer days as well as recreational boating, though no gas motors are allowed on the lake.

Since the reservoir was created in 1960, there has been fear in Silverton that Silver Creek Dam might someday give way. Though structural engineers have declared the dam safe and deemed the conditions for a dam breach to be almost out of the realm of possibility, US Army Corps of Engineers studies have found that a collapse of the dam would be catastrophic to the city below.

== See also ==
- List of lakes in Oregon
