= Table Rock Wilderness =

Wilderness area in Oregon, United States

- IUCN category Ib (wilderness area)
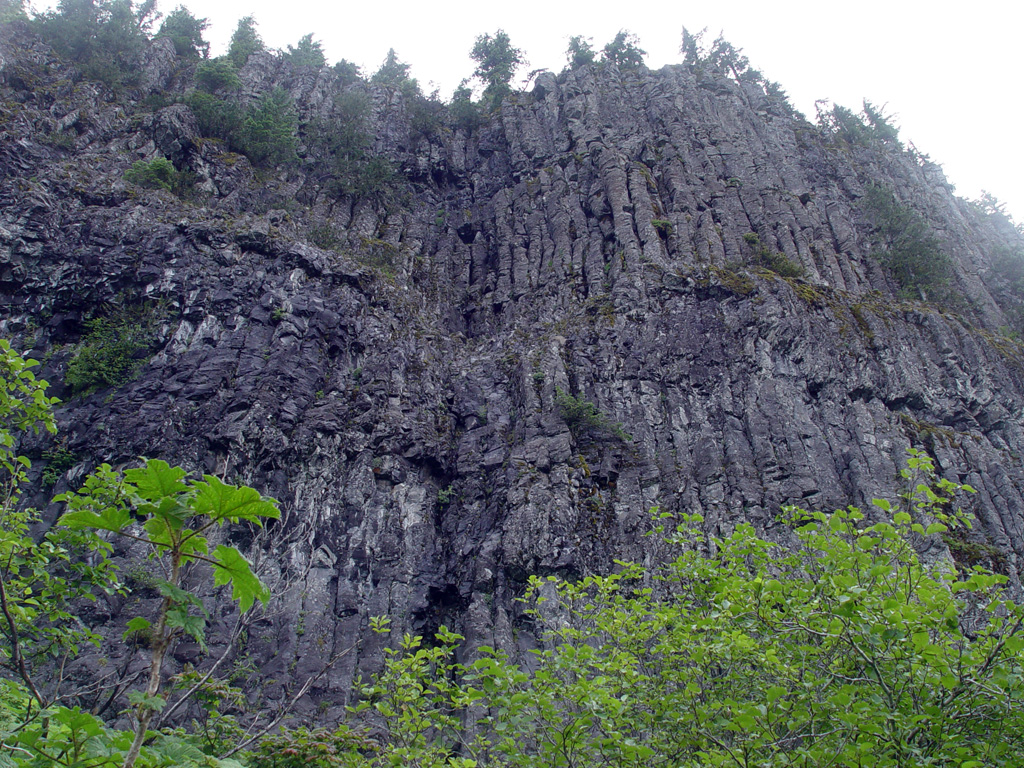
- Interactive map of Table Rock Wilderness
- Location: Clackamas County, Oregon, United States
- Nearest city: Molalla, Oregon
- Coordinates: 44°57′45″N 122°20′36″W
- Area: 5,500 acres (2,200 ha)
- Established: 1984
- Governing body: Bureau of Land Management

The Table Rock Wilderness is a small pocket wilderness designated in 1984 in the western Cascade Mountains in northwestern Oregon, United States. The wilderness area protects 5,500 acres (2,200 ha) of forest in the historic Molalla River–Pudding River drainage basin, some 19 miles (31 km) southeast of Molalla, Oregon and 50 miles (80 km) southeast of Portland. Somewhat unusual for a wilderness in this area is that it is on BLM land rather the nearby Mount Hood National Forest.

== Topography ==
The wilderness is in the densely forested and lower western Cascades, with the highest point being the namesake Table Rock which rises to an elevation of 4,881 feet (1,488 m). Table Rock offers interesting examples of columnar basalt.

== Vegetation ==
The rugged Table Rock Wilderness is home to a forest of old-growth Douglas fir and western hemlock, with noble fir at higher elevations and crowds of rhododendron on many of the upper slopes. By August huckleberry and salmonberry ripen on the slopes of Table and Rooster Rock. The rock slide on the north facing side of Table Rock is surrounded by a profusion of salmonberry. At least two endangered plants bloom here – Sullivantia oregana and Gorman's aster.

== Trails ==
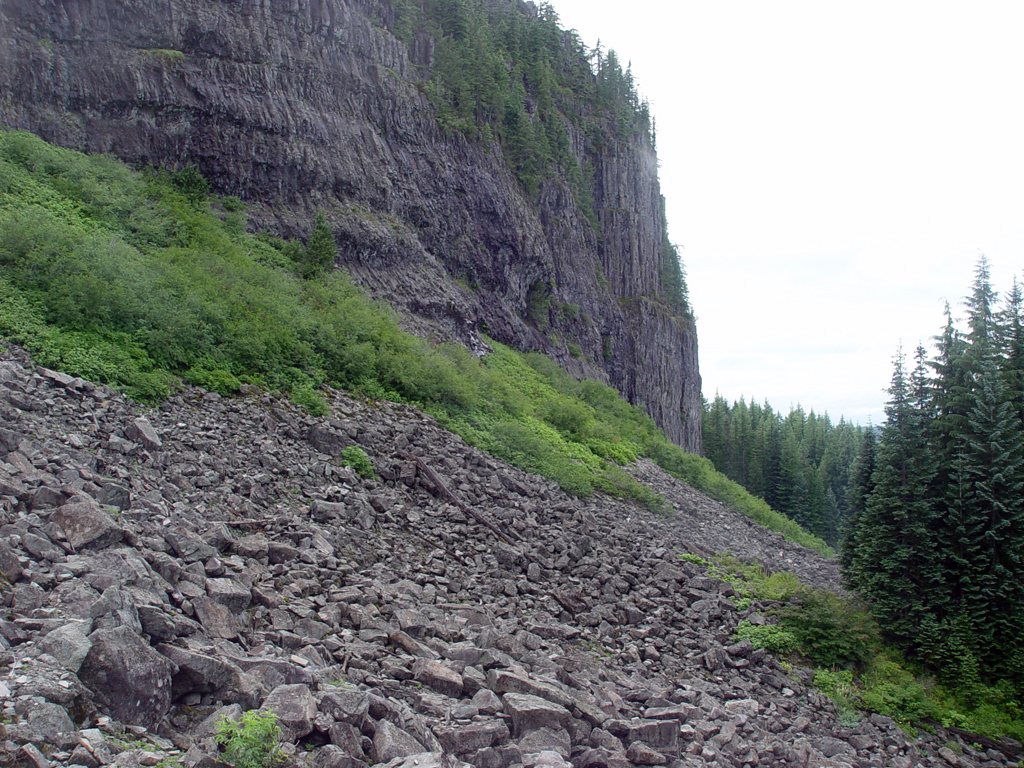
Rock field beneath Table Rock

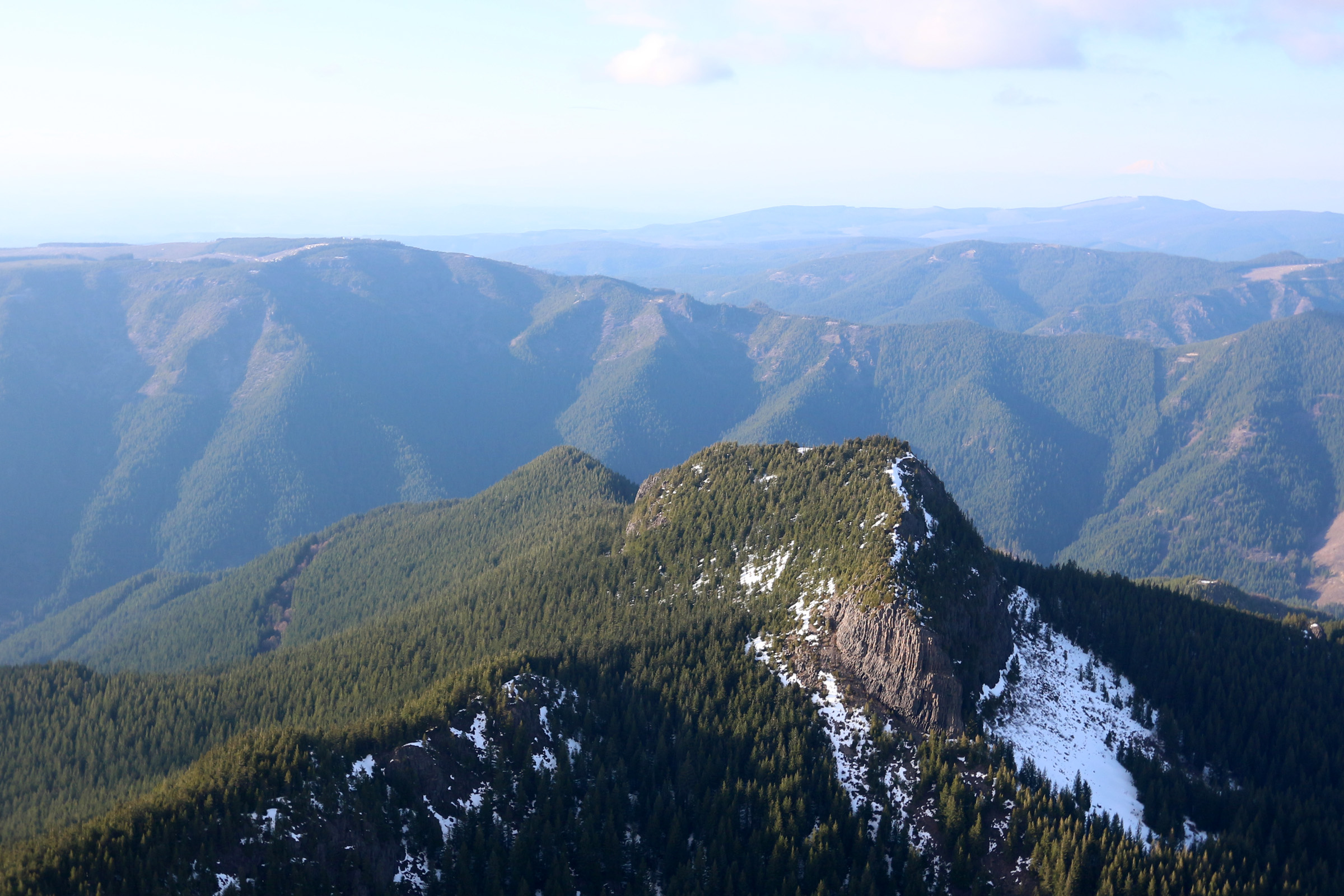
An aerial view of Table Rock, April 2016

There are four trailheads to the area. The main trail, Table Rock Trail, is the same path used by Native Americans and was part of the larger cross-Cascades trail system. Sites of archeological interest can be found here, including petroglyphs. A moderately difficult hiking trail climbs 3.6 miles (5.8 km) to the summit of Table Rock where the western Cascades can be viewed. The panorama stretches from Mount Rainier in the north to Mount Shasta, a mere speck in the distance, in California. The higher trails are snow-covered from November to May, though usually clear by Memorial Day.

== Wildlife ==
The rock slide on the north facing side of Table Rock is well populated by a large colony of pikas, a small alpine herbivore.

== See also ==
- List of Oregon Wildernesses
- List of U.S. Wilderness Areas
- Wilderness Act
