= Silver Creek (Oregon) =

Silver Creek is the name of several different streams, locales, and other features in the U.S. state of Oregon, including:

name	type	elevation	coordinate	USGS map	GNIS ID	description
Little North Fork Silver Creek (Marion County, Oregon)	Stream	1,617 ft (493 m)	44.8839°N 122.5981°W	Elk Prairie	1123243	
Little Silver Creek (Josephine County, Oregon)	Stream	1,325 ft (404 m)	42.4517°N 123.8531°W	York Butte	1145255	
Little Silver Creek (Curry County, Oregon)	Stream	62 ft (19 m)	42.4928°N 124.2128°W	Quosatana Butte	1145256	
Little Silver Creek Lake (Josephine County, Oregon)	Lake	2,228 ft (679 m)	42.4803°N 123.8164°W	York Butte	1155689	
North Fork Silver Creek (Josephine County, Oregon)	Stream	899 ft (274 m)	42.4564°N 123.8867°W	Silver Peak	1146997	
North Fork Silver Creek (Lake County, Oregon)	Stream	5,095 ft (1,553 m)	42.9861°N 121.1581°W	Partin Butte	1156729	
North Fork Silver Creek (Marion County, Oregon)	Stream	1,378 ft (420 m)	44.8764°N 122.6489°W	Drake Crossing	1163178	meets South Fork Silver Creek to form Silver Creek (Marion County, Oregon)
North Silver Creek Youth Camp (Marion County, Oregon)	Locale	1,539 ft (469 m)	44.8886°N 122.6275°W	Drake Crossing	1162315	
Silver Butte Creek (Curry County, Oregon)	Stream	82 ft (25 m)	42.7733°N 124.4983°W	Sixes	1154678	
Silver Creek (Yamhill County, Oregon)	Stream	331 ft (101 m)	45.2961°N 123.3244°W	Fairdale	1126960	
Silver Creek (Coos County, Oregon)	Stream	331 ft (101 m)	43.4814°N 123.9308°W	Golden Falls	1126961	
Silver Creek (Lane County, Oregon)	Stream	928 ft (283 m)	44.1164°N 122.4436°W	Nimrod	1126962	
Silver Creek (Baker County, Oregon)	Stream	4,987 ft (1,520 m)	44.8086°N 118.2078°W	Bourne	1126963	
Silver Creek (Marion County, Oregon)	Stream	157 ft (48 m)	45.0003°N 122.8408°W	Silverton	1126964	formed out of the South and North forks from the Cascade foothills; forms in Silver Falls State Park
Silver Creek (Curry County, Oregon)	Stream	69 ft (21 m)	42.5011°N 124.2361°W	Soldier Camp Mountain	1149483	
Silver Creek (Douglas County, Oregon)	Stream	23 ft (7.0 m)	43.6731°N 124.1608°W	Winchester Bay	1149484	
Silver Creek (Grant County, Oregon)	Stream	3,793 ft (1,156 m)	44.8786°N 118.5881°W	Silver Butte	1149485	
Silver Creek (Lake County, Oregon)	Stream	4,311 ft (1,314 m)	43.1267°N 120.9319°W	Tuff Butte	1149486	
Silver Creek (Harney County, Oregon)	Stream	4,101 ft (1,250 m)	43.2631°N 119.1892°W	Northwest Harney Lake	1149487	flows into Harney Lake
Silver Creek (Josephine County, Oregon)	Stream	276 ft (84 m)	42.4544°N 124.0003°W	Silver Peak	1149488	
Silver Creek (Lane County, Oregon)	Stream	2,185 ft (666 m)	43.8844°N 122.2639°W	Sardine Butte	1149489	
Silver Creek (Umatilla County, Oregon)	Stream	4,252 ft (1,296 m)	45.1008°N 119.1047°W	Deerhorn Creek	1149490	
Silver Creek (Wallowa County, Oregon)	Stream	3,983 ft (1,214 m)	45.3956°N 117.4272°W	Lostine	1149491	
Silver Creek (Linn County, Oregon)	Stream	3,271 ft (997 m)	44.5886°N 122.3011°W	Quartzville	1153818	
Silver Creek (Douglas County, Oregon)	Stream	2,008 ft (612 m)	43.1053°N 122.5956°W	Buckeye Lake	1155281	
Silver Creek (Douglas County, Oregon)	Stream	16 ft (4.9 m)	43.8550°N 124.0619°W	Fivemile Creek	1639262	
Silver Creek Camp (Baker County, Oregon)	Locale	5,108 ft (1,557 m)	44.8108°N 118.2167°W	Bourne	1126965	
Silver Creek Cemetery (Harney County, Oregon)	Cemetery	4,324 ft (1,318 m)	43.6006°N 119.6211°W	Riley	2696682	
Silver Creek Dam (Marion County, Oregon)	Dam	440 ft (130 m)	44.9831°N 122.7461°W	Drake Crossing	1133677	
Silver Creek Dam (Harney County, Oregon)	Dam	4,163 ft (1,269 m)	43.4067°N 119.3994°W	Moon Reservoir	1133679	
Silver Creek Landing (Lane County, Oregon)	Locale	928 ft (283 m)	44.1164°N 122.4428°W	Nimrod	1162259	
Silver Creek Landing Boat Ramp (Lane County, Oregon)	Locale	906 ft (276 m)	44.1161°N 122.4428°W	Nimrod	2668140	
Silver Creek Marsh (Lake County, Oregon)	Swamp	4,829 ft (1,472 m)	43.0033°N 121.1361°W	Bridge Creek Draw	1149492	
Silver Creek Marsh Recreation Site (Lake County, Oregon)	Locale	4,819 ft (1,469 m)	43.0058°N 121.1336°W	Bridge Creek Draw	1155829	
Silver Creek Post Office (historical) (Marion County, Oregon)	Post Office	312 ft (95 m)	44.9886°N 122.7658°W	Stayton NE	1164681	
Silver Creek Reservoir (Marion County, Oregon)	Reservoir	417 ft (127 m)	44.9822°N 122.7411°W	Drake Crossing	1133678	
Silver Creek Reservoir (Lake County, Oregon)	Reservoir	4,439 ft (1,353 m)	43.0844°N 121.0783°W	Hager Mountain	1161731	
Silver Creek Riffle (Curry County, Oregon)	Rapids	89 ft (27 m)	42.5006°N 124.2372°W	Soldier Camp Mountain	1159195	
Silver Creek Valley (Harney County, Oregon)	Valley	4,163 ft (1,269 m)	43.4553°N 119.4289°W	Moon Reservoir	1126966	
Silver Falls State Park (Marion County, Oregon)	Park	1,384 ft (422 m)	44.8511°N 122.6461°W	Stout Mountain	1158484	
Silver Fork (Siskiyou County, California)	Stream	3,842 ft (1,171 m)	41.9992°N 122.9542°W	Condrey Mountain	266186	
South Fork Silver Creek (Marion County, Oregon)	Stream	958 ft (292 m)	44.8892°N 122.6633°W	Drake Crossing	1127320	meets North Fork Silver Creek to form Silver Creek (Marion County, Oregon)
South Fork Silver Creek (Josephine County, Oregon)	Stream	1,148 ft (350 m)	42.4522°N 123.8789°W	Silver Peak	1150013	
South Silver Creek Youth Camp (Marion County, Oregon)	Locale	1,542 ft (470 m)	44.8547°N 122.6097°W	Lyons	1127348	
Thompson Valley Diversion Dam (Lake County, Oregon)	Dam	4,439 ft (1,353 m)	43.0917°N 121.0794°W	Hager Mountain	1153943	
Upper Silver Creek Ranch (Harney County, Oregon)	Locale	4,295 ft (1,309 m)	43.5833°N 119.5969°W	Riley	1161895	
West Fork Silver Creek (Coos County, Oregon)	Stream	486 ft (148 m)	43.4853°N 123.9339°W	Golden Falls	1128867	
West Fork Silver Creek (Lake County, Oregon)	Stream	4,439 ft (1,353 m)	43.0858°N 121.0814°W	Hager Mountain	1152113	
