= Scotts Mills, Oregon =

- City
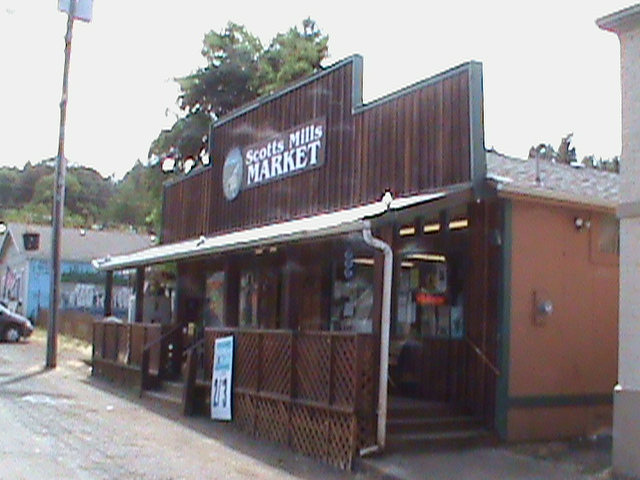
- The Scotts Mills Market

- Location in Oregon
- Coordinates: 45°02′28″N 122°40′08″W
- Country: United States
- State: Oregon
- County: Marion
- Incorporated: 1916

Government
  - Mayor: Paul Brakeman

Area
  - Total: 0.36 sq mi (0.93 km^{2})
  - Land: 0.36 sq mi (0.93 km^{2})
  - Water: 0 sq mi (0.00 km^{2})
- Elevation: 495 ft (151 m)

Population (2020)
  - Total: 419
  - Density: 1,161.4/sq mi (448.42/km^{2})
- Time zone: UTC-8 (Pacific)
  - Summer (DST): UTC-7 (Pacific)
- ZIP Code: 97375
- Area code: 503
- FIPS code: 41-65800
- GNIS feature ID: 2411843
- Website: scottsmills.org

Scotts Mills is a city in Marion County, Oregon, United States. The population was 419 at the 2020 census, up from 357 in 2010.

Scotts Mills is part of the Salem Metropolitan Statistical Area. It is near the site of the 1993 Scotts Mills earthquake.

== Name ==
The city takes its name from the sawmill and flour mill on Butte Creek owned by Robert Hall Scott and Thomas Scott at this location, which became known as Scotts Mills in about 1866. Thomas Scott was the first postmaster at the post office established here in 1887.

== Geography ==
Scotts Mills is along the northeastern edge of Marion County, bordered to the northeast by Clackamas County. It is 2 miles (3 km) south of Marquam and Oregon Route 213. Silverton is 7 miles (11 km) to the southwest, Molalla is 10 miles (16 km) to the northeast, and Salem, the state capital and Marion county seat, is 22 miles (35 km) to the west-southwest.

According to the U.S. Census Bureau, Scotts Mills has a total area of 0.36 square miles (0.93 km^{2}), all land. Butte Creek forms the northeastern border of Scotts Mills and the Clackamas County line as it makes its way northwest to join the Pudding River, part of the Willamette River watershed.

== Climate ==
This region experiences warm (but not hot) and dry summers, with no average monthly temperatures above 71.6 °F (22.0 °C). According to the Köppen Climate Classification system, Scotts Mills has a warm-summer Mediterranean climate, abbreviated "Csb" on climate maps.

Climate data for Scotts Mills
Month	Jan	Feb	Mar	Apr	May	Jun	Jul	Aug	Sep	Oct	Nov	Dec	Year
Record high °F (°C)	69 (21)	71 (22)	72 (22)	82 (28)	97 (36)	94 (34)	98 (37)	99 (37)	98 (37)	87 (31)	76 (24)	69 (21)	99 (37)
Mean daily maximum °F (°C)	43.9 (6.6)	46.5 (8.1)	48.5 (9.2)	52.8 (11.6)	59.2 (15.1)	65 (18)	71.9 (22.2)	72.2 (22.3)	67.8 (19.9)	58.6 (14.8)	48.2 (9.0)	43.8 (6.6)	56.5 (13.6)
Mean daily minimum °F (°C)	31.9 (−0.1)	33 (1)	33.5 (0.8)	35.6 (2.0)	40.3 (4.6)	45.1 (7.3)	48.8 (9.3)	49.3 (9.6)	47 (8)	41.4 (5.2)	35.5 (1.9)	32.4 (0.2)	39.5 (4.2)
Record low °F (°C)	4 (−16)	0 (−18)	10 (−12)	18 (−8)	25 (−4)	29 (−2)	35 (2)	36 (2)	28 (−2)	17 (−8)	11 (−12)	−6 (−21)	−6 (−21)
Average precipitation inches (mm)	11.86 (301)	9.12 (232)	8.91 (226)	6.58 (167)	5.13 (130)	3.34 (85)	1.15 (29)	1.52 (39)	3.18 (81)	6.53 (166)	12.07 (307)	12.58 (320)	81.96 (2,082)
Average snowfall inches (cm)	17.1 (43)	13.2 (34)	13.8 (35)	5.9 (15)	0.6 (1.5)	0 (0)	0 (0)	0 (0)	0 (0)	0.3 (0.76)	6 (15)	14 (36)	71 (180)
Average precipitation days	20	18	20	18	16	11	6	6	9	14	19	21	178

== Demographics ==
Historical population
Census	Pop.	Note	%±
1920	208		—
1930	153		−26.4%
1940	227		48.4%
1950	217		−4.4%
1960	155		−28.6%
1970	208		34.2%
1980	249		19.7%
1990	283		13.7%
2000	312		10.2%
2010	357		14.4%
2020	419		17.4%
U.S. Decennial Census

=== 2020 census ===
As of the 2020 census, Scotts Mills had a population of 419. The median age was 36.5 years, 28.9% of residents were under the age of 18, and 13.8% were 65 years of age or older. For every 100 females there were 96.7 males, and for every 100 females age 18 and over there were 102.7 males age 18 and over.

0% of residents lived in urban areas, while 100.0% lived in rural areas.

There were 143 households in Scotts Mills, of which 39.2% had children under the age of 18 living in them. Of all households, 56.6% were married-couple households, 21.0% were households with a male householder and no spouse or partner present, and 14.7% were households with a female householder and no spouse or partner present. About 19.6% of all households were made up of individuals and 11.9% had someone living alone who was 65 years of age or older.

There were 148 housing units, of which 3.4% were vacant. Among occupied housing units, 83.9% were owner-occupied and 16.1% were renter-occupied. The homeowner vacancy rate was <0.1% and the rental vacancy rate was <0.1%.

Racial composition as of the 2020 census
Race	Number	Percent
White	374	89.3%
Black or African American	1	0.2%
American Indian and Alaska Native	3	0.7%
Asian	1	0.2%
Native Hawaiian and Other Pacific Islander	0	0%
Some other race	9	2.1%
Two or more races	31	7.4%
Hispanic or Latino (of any race)	20	4.8%

=== 2010 census ===
As of the census of 2010, there were 357 people, 131 households, and 93 families residing in the city. The population density was 991.7 inhabitants per square mile (382.9/km^{2}). There were 138 housing units at an average density of 383.3 per square mile (148.0/km^{2}). The racial makeup of the city was 97.5% White, 0.3% Native American, 1.4% Asian, and 0.8% from two or more races. Hispanic or Latino of any race were 2.2% of the population.

There were 131 households, of which 32.1% had children under the age of 18 living with them, 61.1% were married couples living together, 4.6% had a female householder with no husband present, 5.3% had a male householder with no wife present, and 29.0% were non-families. 19.1% of all households were made up of individuals, and 5.3% had someone living alone who was 65 years of age or older. The average household size was 2.73 and the average family size was 3.17.

The median age in the city was 40.8 years. 24.9% of residents were under the age of 18; 8.9% were between the ages of 18 and 24; 21.9% were from 25 to 44; 32.5% were from 45 to 64; and 11.8% were 65 years of age or older. The gender makeup of the city was 53.5% male and 46.5% female.

=== 2000 census ===
As of the census of 2000, there were 312 people, 107 households, and 80 families residing in the city. The population density was 988.6 inhabitants per square mile (381.7/km^{2}). There were 108 housing units at an average density of 342.2 per square mile (132.1/km^{2}). The racial makeup of the city was 93.91% White, 0.64% from other races, and 5.45% from two or more races. Hispanic or Latino of any race were 3.53% of the population.

There were 107 households, out of which 37.4% had children under the age of 18 living with them, 53.3% were married couples living together, 13.1% had a female householder with no husband present, and 25.2% were non-families. 18.7% of all households were made up of individuals, and 5.6% had someone living alone who was 65 years of age or older. The average household size was 2.92 and the average family size was 3.30.

In the city, the population was spread out, with 28.8% under the age of 18, 8.0% from 18 to 24, 30.8% from 25 to 44, 19.6% from 45 to 64, and 12.8% who were 65 years of age or older. The median age was 36 years. For every 100 females, there were 103.9 males. For every 100 females age 18 and over, there were 100.0 males.

The median income for a household in the city was $35,208, and the median income for a family was $37,500. Males had a median income of $31,000 versus $20,000 for females. The per capita income for the city was $15,033. About 9.0% of families and 10.7% of the population were below the poverty line, including 16.3% of those under age 18 and 2.3% of those age 65 or over.

== Scotts Mills Park ==
The park, managed by Marion County, opened in 1961 on 10 acres (4.0 ha) of land donated by Portland General Electric and 3 acres (1.2 ha) donated by Merle and Barbara Haskins. In 2023, an additional 6 plus acres were acquired through combined purchase and donation to expand the park by longtime residents Terry and Patty Caster. Open from 8 a.m. to sunset from May to October, it has play fields and equipment, picnic tables, restrooms, a waterfall, a wading pool, and a swimming hole in Butte Creek.
