= Molalla River =

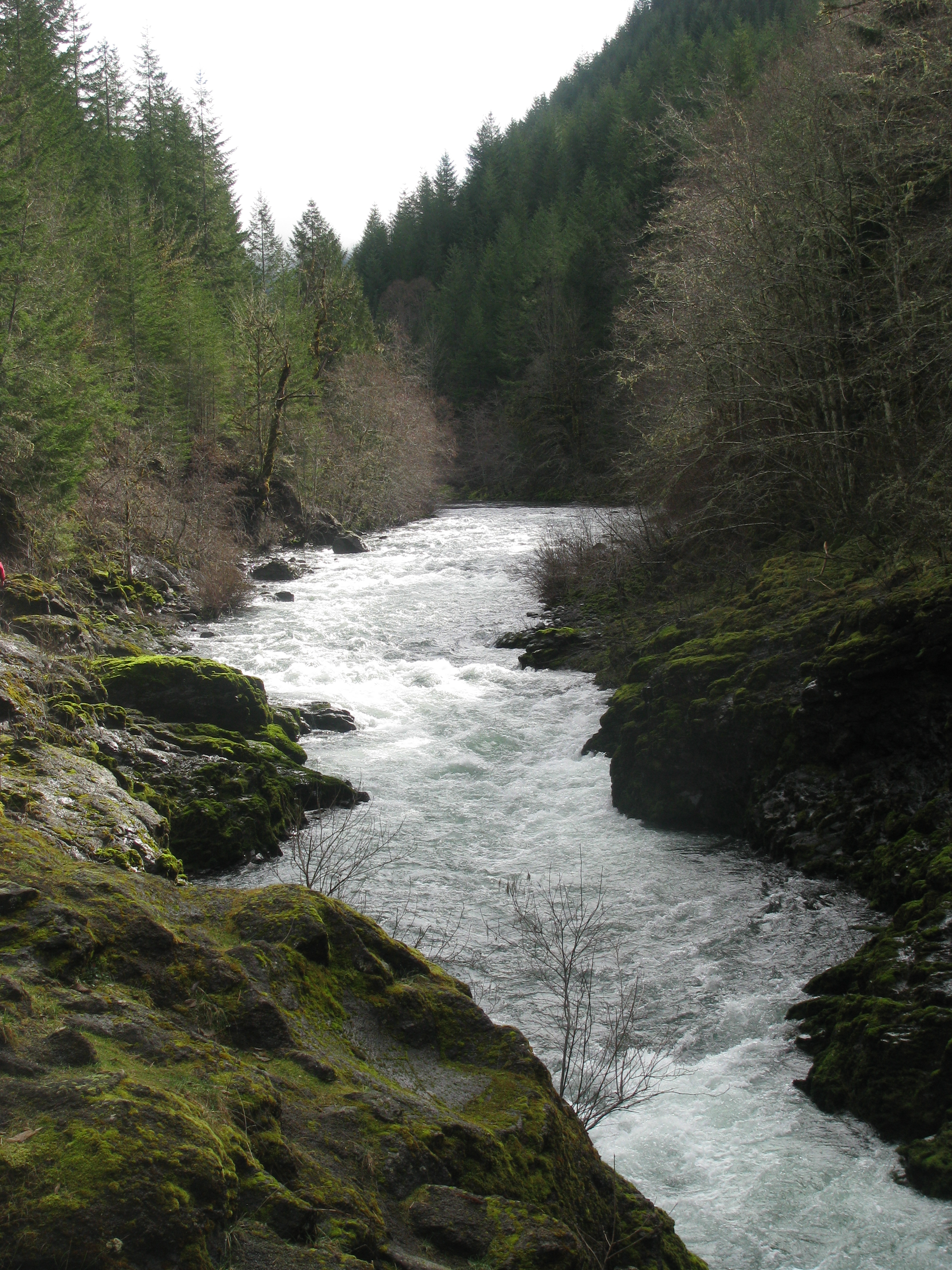
- Molalla River

- Location of the Molalla River mouth in Oregon
- Etymology: After the Molala people

Location
- Country: United States
- State: Oregon
- County: Clackamas

Physical characteristics
- Source: Table Rock Wilderness Area
  - location: Cascade Range
  - coordinates: 44°54′12″N 122°16′01″W
  - elevation: 3,304 ft (1,007 m)
- Mouth: Willamette River
  - location: Molalla River State Park
  - coordinates: 45°17′23″N 122°43′18″W
  - elevation: 69 ft (21 m)
- Length: 51 mi (82 km)
- Basin size: 874 sq mi (2,260 km^{2})
- Discharge
  - location: river mouth
  - average: 2,377 cu ft/s (67.3 m^{3}/s)
- Discharge
  - location: above Pudding River
  - average: 1,142 cu ft/s (32.3 m^{3}/s)

National Wild and Scenic River
- Type: Recreational
- Designated: March 12, 2019

The Molalla River is a 51-mile (82 km) tributary of the Willamette River in the northwestern part of Oregon in the United States. Flowing northwest from the Cascade Range through Table Rock Wilderness, it passes the city of Molalla before entering the larger river near Canby. The Molalla is the largest Willamette tributary unblocked by a dam.

== Course ==
The river's headwaters are in Clackamas County, near the Table Rock Wilderness, in the Cascade Range. Flowing generally north-northwest from the mountains, the river enters the Willamette Valley and flows past the city of Molalla. It is joined by the Pudding River shortly before entering the Willamette near the city of Canby. The confluence is about 36 miles (58 km) from the Willamette's mouth on the Columbia River. The Molalla River is the largest free-flowing tributary of the Willamette.

Named tributaries from source to mouth are Henry, Ogle, Mining Iron, Lake, Scorpion, Hay Barn, Minnette, Dungeon, Avalanche, and Bull creeks, followed by Table Rock Fork. Below that are Horse, Gawley, Cow, Bear, Shotgun, Pine, and Trout creeks followed by the North Fork Molalla River. Then come Russell, Cedar, Dickey, Woodcock, Milk, and Gribble creeks, then the Pudding River.

=== Discharge ===
The average discharge of the river at the mouth is 2,377 cubic feet per second (67.3 m^{3}/s). Above the confluence with the Pudding River, the average discharge is 1,142 cubic feet per second (32.3 m^{3}/s), about half of the flow at the mouth.

== History ==
During the early 19th century, the area around the river was populated by the Molala people. During that time, an extensive system of trails along the river allowed trade between the peoples of the Willamette Valley and eastern Oregon. As late as the 1920s, the trails were used by Native Americans from the Warm Springs Indian Reservation to reach huckleberry-picking grounds near Table Rock.

Starting in about 1840, European-American settlers began farming in the bottomlands along the lower Molalla. Spurred by passage of the Donation Land Claim Act, the influx continued, and by 1860 there were 75 households in the Molalla area. Wheat was the most common crop, and these early settlers also cultivated potatoes and root vegetables such as turnips and cabbages, and planted apple trees. They fished, hunted, gathered huckleberries, and kept sheep, cows, pigs and chickens.

Gold mining occurred along the Molalla after the discovery of placer gold in 1860. Many claims were filed during the next 40 years. Four mining companies, of which the Ogle Mountain Mining Company was the biggest, had operations in the watershed by the early 20th century. The company operated a mine along Ogle Creek, a Molalla tributary, between 1903 and 1915.

In the 20th century, the watershed became an area of intense logging. Timber companies built forest roads and a spur railroad, set up timber camps, constructed splash dams, and used the river and Milk Creek for transporting logs. Between 1941 and 1945, hundreds of log trucks passed through Molalla every day.

== Bridges ==
This is a list of bridges and other crossings of the Molalla River from its confluence with the Willamette River upstream to its source in the Cascade Range.

Crossing	Carries	Location	River mile	Year built	Coordinates
Knight's Bridge	Knight's Bridge road	Canby	2.7	1877 (original structure); 1964 (replacement)	45.267338°N 122.710285°W
Rail bridge	Southern Pacific rail (Canby-Aurora)	Canby	3.7		45.256692°N 122.709083°W
99E Bridge	Oregon Route 99E	Canby	3.8		45.255484°N 122.707645°W
Goods Bridge	Hwy 170 (S Kropf Road) (Canby-Marquam Hwy)	Canby	6.0		45.244414°N 122.687448°W
Rail Bridge	Canby-Molalla rail spur	Canby	10.0		45.22826°N 122.63434°W
Hwy 213 Bridge	Hwy 213 (Cascade Hwy)	Mulino, Liberal	14.5		45.199968°N 122.581195°W
Hwy 211 Bridge	Hwy 211 (Woodburn-Estacada Hwy)	Molalla	18.5		45.161717°N 122.535083°W
Feyrer Park Bridge	Feyrer Park road	Molalla	20.7		45.13864°N 122.53356°W
Private Bridge	Molalla Forest Service road	Molalla	22.4		45.120129°N 122.535024°W

=== Knight's Bridge ===
Knight's Bridge was a wooden covered bridge built in 1877 over the Molalla River on the western city limit of Canby. The bridge was destroyed in 1947. In 1964, a steel bridge with a concrete deck replaced the former crossing. It is 344 feet (104.9 m) long with a deck width of 31 feet (9.5 m) and carries Knight's Bridge Road, a two-lane thoroughfare, over the river.

== Recreation ==
=== Parks ===
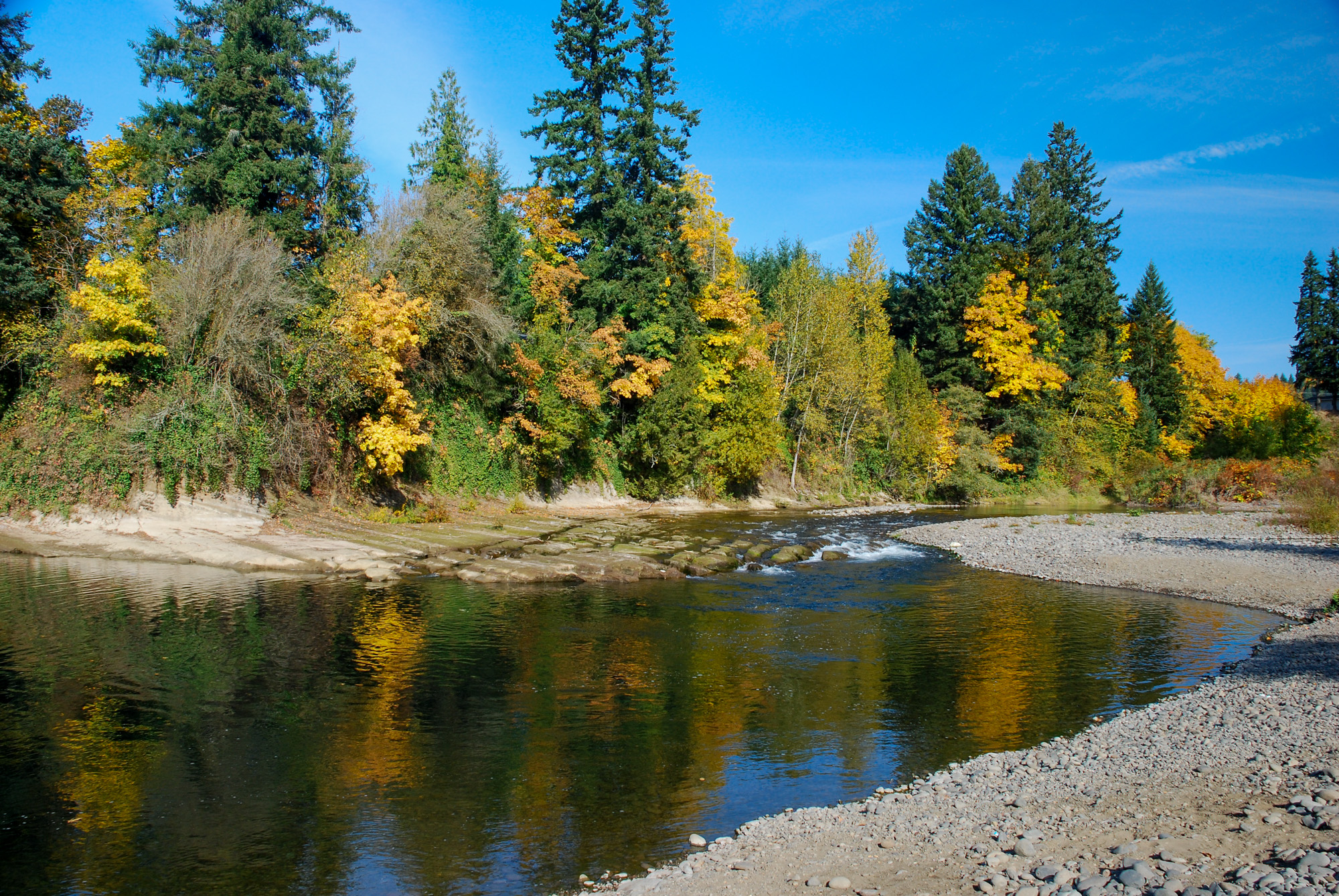
Molalla River at Wagon Wheel County Park.

Molalla River State Park is a 567-acre (229 ha) day-use area, part of the Willamette Greenway, where the Molalla, Pudding, and Willamette rivers converge, 2 miles (3 km) north of Canby. Used mainly for recreation by local residents, its attractions include fishing, boating, water-skiing, picnicking, and wildlife viewing. It has a 0.75-mile (1.21 km) nature trail, restrooms, a boat launch, and an area for flying radio-controlled aircraft. Among its features is a rookery for great blue herons, among the largest in the Willamette Valley.

Feyrer Park, a county park, is along the river 3 miles (5 km) southeast of Molalla at Dickey Prairie. It has 20 sites for camping in tents or recreational vehicles (RV)s, all supplied with water and electric hook-ups. Other amenities include picnic tables, horseshoe pits, and access to fishing.

=== Hiking ===
Table Rock Wilderness, 6,028 acres (2,439 ha) of rugged forest land added to the National Wilderness Preservation System in 1984, is 19 miles (31 km) southeast of Molalla along the headwaters of the river. Overseen by the Bureau of Land Management, it has four trailheads—Table Rock, Old Bridge, Rooster Rock, and Bull Creek—linked to a 16-mile (26 km) network of hiking and horse-riding trails.

=== Boating ===
Whitewater enthusiasts sometimes run the upper reaches of the Molalla River as well as the lower. Under certain conditions, the 5.1-mile (8.2 km) stretch from Copper Creek to Table Rock Fork can be navigated by boaters capable of handling technical class III (intermediate) to IV (advanced) water on the International Scale of River Difficulty. Below that comes a stretch, about 5 miles (8 km) long, of class III to III+ water. Hazards on these upper miles may include narrow chutes, sudden drops, and logs in the water. The next 8 miles (13 km), Turner Bridge to Glen Avon Bridge, are rated technical class III to IV with hazards similar to the upper reaches but also including scouting difficulties as well as a dangerous undercut at a rapids called Goldilocks.

The lower reaches are much gentler. The 6-mile (10 km) run from Glen Avon Bridge to Freyer Park is rated class II (novice). Here the most difficult rapids occur in the first half of the run. Below that come 6 miles (10 km) of class I (beginner) water from Freyer Park to the Oregon 213 Bridge.

=== Fishing ===
The river supports populations of smallmouth bass near the confluence with the Willamette River and of wild cutthroat trout in the upper reaches and tributaries. Trout fishing is limited to catch and release as is angling for wild steelhead or Chinook salmon, which also frequent the Molalla.

== See also ==
- List of rivers of Oregon
- List of longest streams of Oregon
