= Lyons, Oregon =

- City
- Location in Oregon
- Coordinates: 44°46′40″N 122°36′35″W
- Country: United States
- State: Oregon
- County: Linn
- Incorporated: 1958

Government
  - Mayor: Lloyd Valentine

Area
  - Total: 0.88 sq mi (2.28 km^{2})
  - Land: 0.87 sq mi (2.25 km^{2})
  - Water: 0.012 sq mi (0.03 km^{2})
- Elevation: 633 ft (193 m)

Population (2020)
  - Total: 1,202
  - Density: 1,382.4/sq mi (533.73/km^{2})
- Time zone: UTC-8 (Pacific)
  - Summer (DST): UTC-7 (Pacific)
- ZIP code: 97358
- Area code: 503
- FIPS code: 41-44300
- GNIS feature ID: 2410902
- Website: www.cityoflyons.org

Lyons is a city in Linn County, Oregon, United States. As of the 2020 census, Lyons had a population of 1,202. The center of population of Oregon is located in Lyons.

== History ==
Some homes in the town were destroyed in the 2020 Santiam Fire.

== Geography ==
According to the United States Census Bureau, the city has a total area of 0.88 square miles (2.28 km^{2}), of which 0.87 square miles (2.25 km^{2}) is land and 0.01 square miles (0.03 km^{2}) is water.

=== Climate ===
This region experiences warm (but not hot) and dry summers, with no average monthly temperatures above 71.6 °F (22.0 °C). According to the Köppen Climate Classification system, Lyons has a warm-summer Mediterranean climate, abbreviated "Csb" on climate maps.

== Demographics ==
Historical population
| Census | Pop. | Note | %± |
|---|---|---|---|
| 1960 | 463 | | — |
| 1970 | 645 | | 39.3% |
| 1980 | 877 | | 36.0% |
| 1990 | 938 | | 7.0% |
| 2000 | 1,008 | | 7.5% |
| 2010 | 1,161 | | 15.2% |
| 2020 | 1,202 | | 3.5% |
U.S. Decennial Census

=== 2020 census ===
As of the 2020 census, Lyons had a population of 1,202. The median age was 46.7 years. 20.6% of residents were under the age of 18 and 22.7% of residents were 65 years of age or older. For every 100 females there were 100.0 males, and for every 100 females age 18 and over there were 100.8 males age 18 and over.

0% of residents lived in urban areas, while 100.0% lived in rural areas.

There were 461 households in Lyons, of which 26.0% had children under the age of 18 living in them. Of all households, 60.7% were married-couple households, 16.7% were households with a male householder and no spouse or partner present, and 17.4% were households with a female householder and no spouse or partner present. About 18.3% of all households were made up of individuals and 9.3% had someone living alone who was 65 years of age or older.

There were 515 housing units, of which 10.5% were vacant. Among occupied housing units, 83.7% were owner-occupied and 16.3% were renter-occupied. The homeowner vacancy rate was 1.0% and the rental vacancy rate was 9.5%.

Racial composition as of the 2020 census
| Race | Number | Percent |
|---|---|---|
| White | 1,065 | 88.6% |
| Black or African American | 2 | 0.2% |
| American Indian and Alaska Native | 13 | 1.1% |
| Asian | 12 | 1.0% |
| Native Hawaiian and Other Pacific Islander | 1 | 0.1% |
| Some other race | 26 | 2.2% |
| Two or more races | 83 | 6.9% |
| Hispanic or Latino (of any race) | 57 | 4.7% |

=== 2010 census ===
As of the census of 2010, there were 1,161 people, 444 households, and 332 families living in the city. The population density was 1,334.5 inhabitants per square mile (515.3/km^{2}). There were 475 housing units at an average density of 546.0 per square mile (210.8/km^{2}). The racial makeup of the city was 91.4% White, 0.4% African American, 1.5% Native American, 1.1% Asian, 0.4% Pacific Islander, 2.0% from other races, and 3.2% from two or more races. Hispanic or Latino of any race were 4.5% of the population.

There were 444 households, of which 29.7% had children under the age of 18 living with them, 64.0% were married couples living together, 5.6% had a female householder with no husband present, 5.2% had a male householder with no wife present, and 25.2% were non-families. 16.4% of all households were made up of individuals, and 7.2% had someone living alone who was 65 years of age or older. The average household size was 2.61 and the average family size was 2.92.

The median age in the city was 44.7 years. 21.8% of residents were under the age of 18; 6.5% were between the ages of 18 and 24; 21.9% were from 25 to 44; 34% were from 45 to 64; and 15.7% were 65 years of age or older. The gender makeup of the city was 51.0% male and 49.0% female.

=== 2000 census ===
As of the census of 2000, there were 1,008 people, 372 households, and 296 families living in the city. The population density was 1,165.8 inhabitants per square mile (450.1/km^{2}). There were 395 housing units at an average density of 456.8 per square mile (176.4/km^{2}). The racial makeup of the city was 93.06% White, 1.79% Native American, 0.20% Asian, 0.20% Pacific Islander, 0.79% from other races, and 3.97% from two or more races. Hispanic or Latino of any race were 1.69% of the population.

There were 372 households, out of which 31.7% had children under the age of 18 living with them, 66.4% were married couples living together, 7.8% had a female householder with no husband present, and 20.4% were non-families. 14.0% of all households were made up of individuals, and 4.8% had someone living alone who was 65 years of age or older. The average household size was 2.71 and the average family size was 2.94.

In the city, the population was spread out, with 25.8% under the age of 18, 7.7% from 18 to 24, 25.3% from 25 to 44, 28.4% from 45 to 64, and 12.8% who were 65 years of age or older. The median age was 39 years. For every 100 females, there were 100.8 males. For every 100 females age 18 and over, there were 99.5 males.

The median income for a household in the city was $40,368, and the median income for a family was $45,875. Males had a median income of $34,286 versus $22,083 for females. The per capita income for the city was $15,628. About 9.3% of families and 11.7% of the population were below the poverty line, including 14.1% of those under age 18 and 15.2% of those age 65 or over.
