= North Falls =

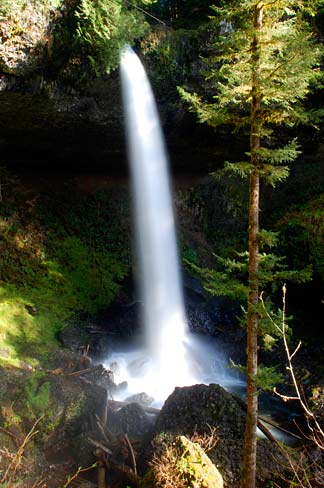
- North Falls in the Spring
- Interactive map of North Falls
- Location: Silver Falls State Park
- Coordinates: 44.88489°N 122.62267°W
- Type: Plunge
- Elevation: 1,416 ft (432 m)
- Total height: 65 ft (20 m)
- Average flow rate: 100 cu ft/s (2.8 m^{3}/s)

North Falls is a waterfall located in the Silver Falls State Park at the east end of the city of Salem, in Marion County, in the U.S. state of Oregon. It is located in a privileged area on the west foothills where Mount Hood National Forest meets with the Middle Santiam Wilderness. Several prominent waterfalls are located in the Park along Trail of Ten Falls: South Falls, Drake Falls, Lower South Falls, and Winter Falls—among others.

== Location ==
North Falls is created along the course of North Fork of Silver Creek and it sits on the east section of Silver Falls State Park Trail of Ten Falls, along North Falls Trail, approximately a quarter mile of Upper North Falls. It received its name because it is the primary waterfall along North Silver Creek.

== Description ==
North Falls is the third tallest along the Trail of Ten Falls and the only one in the park that can be viewed from highway 214. The falls drops in a straight plunge down approximately 136 feet (41 m) channeled through a narrow crack in the basaltic bedrock to a steeply slanted protrusion of basalt which causes splashing of the cascade into the pool.

== Trail ==
The Silver Falls area contains multiple popular hiking trails. The North Falls trail is a 1/4 mile trail with a moderate elevation gain approximately 80 stairs that lead behind North Falls through a large cutout on the rock. It continues west and roughly follows North Creek through the Canyon Trail, passing several waterfalls, including Twin Falls, Middle North Falls, Drake Falls, and Lower North Falls. On the opposite direction from the North Falls trailhead is the short, flat trail to Upper North Falls.

The North Falls trail passes behind North Falls in massive undercut cliff that extends back from the falls for at least 100 feet. The ceiling of therecess runs anywhere from 20 to approximately as much as 75 feet above the trail as it passes behind the waterfall. The large size of the undercut rock allows the roar of the falls to be considerably amplified.

== See also ==
- List of waterfalls in Oregon
