= National Register of Historic Places listings in Marion County, Oregon =

Location of Marion County in Oregon

This list presents the full set of buildings, structures, objects, sites, or districts designated on the National Register of Historic Places in Marion County, Oregon, United States, and offers brief descriptive information about each of them. The National Register recognizes places of national, state, or local historic significance across the United States. Out of over 90,000 National Register sites nationwide, Oregon is home to over 2,000, and 121 of those are found partially or wholly in Marion County.

This National Park Service list is complete through NPS recent listings posted August 28, 2026.

== Current listings ==
	Name on the Register	Image	Date listed	Location	City or town	Description
1	Louis J. Adams House	Louis J. Adams House	March 12, 2011 (#11000076)	423 W. Main St. 45°00′11″N 122°47′13″W	Silverton	
2	Louise Adams House	Louise Adams House	March 3, 2015 (#15000052)	401 W. Main Street; 45°00′12″N 122°47′09″W	Silverton	
3	Adolph Block	Adolph Block	February 1, 1980 (#80003348)	360–372 State Street; 44°56′24″N 123°02′22″W	Salem	
4	Samuel Adolph House	Samuel Adolph House	October 2, 1978 (#78002297)	2493 State Street; 44°55′57″N 123°00′37″W	Salem	
5	James Mechlin Anderson House	James Mechlin Anderson House	October 16, 1979 (#79002118)	728 Ankeny Hill Road, SE; 44°46′36″N 123°02′46″W	Jefferson vicinity	
6	Aurora Colony Historic District	Aurora Colony Historic District	April 16, 1974 (#74001696)	District roughly bounded by Cemetery Road, Bobs Avenue, and Liberty Street; 45°13′57″N 122°45′30″W	Aurora	
7	Bank of Woodburn	Bank of Woodburn	September 27, 1996 (#96001049)	199 N Front Street; 45°08′31″N 122°51′27″W	Woodburn	
8	Beauchamp Building	Beauchamp Building	November 1, 2019 (#100004557)	395 N 3rd Avenue; 44°47′52″N 122°47′33″W	Stayton	
9	Oliver Beers House	Oliver Beers House	August 1, 1984 (#84003036)	10602 Wheatland Road, N 45°04′23″N 123°01′24″W	Gervais vicinity	
10	Frederick Bents House	Frederick Bents House	December 9, 1981 (#81000502)	22776 Bents Road, NE; 45°14′54″N 122°48′40″W	Aurora vicinity	Originally built in 1887, this French Prairie farmhouse expanded several times over subsequent years, resulting in an unusual admixture of multiple 19th-century architectural styles. It reflects the changing requirements of farm life and economics over a long period in this portion of the Willamette Valley.
11	R. P. Boise Building	R. P. Boise Building	December 2, 1981 (#81000504)	217 State Street; 44°56′27″N 123°02′30″W	Salem	
12	Boon Brick Store	Boon Brick Store	November 20, 1975 (#75001590)	888 Liberty Street, NE; 44°56′55″N 123°01′59″W	Salem	
13	John D. Boon House	John D. Boon House	January 17, 1975 (#75001591)	1313 Mill Street, SE; 44°56′02″N 123°01′39″W	Salem	Included in the Mission Mill Museum.
14	Charles and Martha Brown House	Charles and Martha Brown House	September 6, 2002 (#02000949)	425 N First Avenue; 44°47′53″N 122°47′40″W	Stayton	
15	Sam Brown House	Sam Brown House	November 5, 1974 (#74001697)	12878 Portland Road, NE; 45°06′21″N 122°53′14″W	Gervais	
16	Burggraf–Burt–Webster House	Burggraf–Burt–Webster House	April 1, 1980 (#80003349)	901 13th Street, SE; 44°55′43″N 123°01′46″W	Salem	
17	Bush and Brey Block and Annex	Bush and Brey Block and Annex	December 21, 1981 (#81000505)	179–197 Commercial Street, NE; 44°56′29″N 123°02′26″W	Salem	
18	Asahel Bush House	Asahel Bush House	January 21, 1974 (#74001700)	600 Mission Street, SE; 44°55′53″N 123°02′21″W	Salem	
19	Bush–Breyman Block	Bush–Breyman Block	February 17, 1978 (#78002298)	141–147 Commercial Street, NE; 44°56′28″N 123°02′26″W	Salem	
20	Calvary Lutheran Church and Parsonage	Calvary Lutheran Church and Parsonage	June 6, 1985 (#85001182)	310–314 Jersey Street; 45°00′16″N 122°46′52″W	Silverton	
21	Hamilton Campbell House	Hamilton Campbell House	March 13, 1979 (#79002119)	13600 Jefferson Highway 99E, SE; 44°45′37″N 123°01′41″W	Jefferson vicinity	No longer extant.
22	William Case Farm	William Case Farm	March 21, 1973 (#73001578)	20755 Case Road, NE; 45°13′06″N 122°52′49″W	Aurora	
23	Champoeg Cemetery	Champoeg Cemetery	January 21, 2004 (#03001475)	Champoeg Cemetery Road; 45°14′20″N 122°52′34″W	Aurora	
24	Champoeg State Park Historic Archeological District	Champoeg State Park Historic Archeological District	August 1, 1984 (#84003038)	8239 Champoeg Road, NE; 45°14′54″N 122°53′37″W	St. Paul	
25	Chemawa Indian School Site	Chemawa Indian School Site	December 16, 1992 (#92001333)	3700 Chemawa Road, NE; 45°00′04″N 122°59′42″W	Chemawa	
26	Chemeketa Lodge No. 1 Odd Fellows Buildings	Chemeketa Lodge No. 1 Odd Fellows Buildings	April 8, 1988 (#88000275)	185–195 High Street, NE; 44°56′26″N 123°02′14″W	Salem	
27	George Collins House	George Collins House	December 1, 1989 (#89002063)	1340 Chemeketa Street, NE; 44°56′19″N 123°01′27″W	Salem	
28	Jacob Conser House	Jacob Conser House	January 21, 1974 (#74001699)	114 Main Street; 44°43′04″N 123°00′43″W	Jefferson	
29	Court Street – Chemeketa Street Historic District	Court Street – Chemeketa Street Historic District	August 26, 1987 (#87001373)	District roughly along Chemeketa and Court Streets, between Mill Creek and 14th Street; 44°56′15″N 123°01′15″W	Salem	
30	Curtis Cross House	Curtis Cross House	December 18, 1981 (#81000506)	1635 Fairmount Avenue, S 44°55′30″N 123°02′56″W	Salem	
31	Dr. William A. Cusick House	Dr. William A. Cusick House	February 23, 1990 (#90000281)	415 Lincoln Street, S 44°55′32″N 123°02′57″W	Salem	
32	Alexander Daue House	Alexander Daue House	June 6, 1985 (#85001181)	1095 Saginaw Street, S 44°55′50″N 123°02′45″W	Salem	
33	Murton E. and Lillian DeGuire House	Murton E. and Lillian DeGuire House	March 12, 2011 (#11000077)	631 B St. 45°00′35″N 122°46′46″W	Silverton	Silverton, Oregon, and Its Environs MPS
34	DeGuire–Ludowitzki House	DeGuire–Ludowitzki House	March 3, 2015 (#15000053)	840 S. Water Street; 44°59′53″N 122°46′37″W	Silverton	
35	Deidrich Building	Deidrich Building	July 7, 2006 (#06000570)	195 N 3rd Avenue; 44°47′47″N 122°47′33″W	Stayton	
36	Delaney–Edwards House	Delaney–Edwards House	July 23, 2004 (#04000729)	4292 Delaney Road, SE; 44°50′35″N 122°58′20″W	Salem vicinity	
37	Joseph Despard Cabin Site		October 31, 1991 (#91001573)	Address restricted	St. Paul	Site only. Foundations removed from short ridge in 1875.
38	June D. Drake House	June D. Drake House	March 12, 2011 (#11000078)	409 S. Water St. 45°00′12″N 122°46′52″W	Silverton	Silverton, Oregon, and Its Environs MPS
39	Magnus and Emma Ek House	Magnus and Emma Ek House	February 20, 2013 (#13000032)	729 S. Water Street; 45°00′00″N 122°46′40″W	Silverton	Silverton, Oregon, and Its Environs MPS
40	Elsinore Theater	Elsinore Theater	June 17, 1994 (#91001575)	170 High Street, SE; 44°56′20″N 123°02′14″W	Salem	
41	Farrar Building	Farrar Building	August 26, 1982 (#82003737)	351–373 State Street; 44°56′25″N 123°02′22″W	Salem	
42	Henry Fawk House	Henry Fawk House	February 20, 1991 (#91000060)	310 Lincoln Street, S 44°55′31″N 123°02′51″W	Salem	
43	First Methodist Episcopal Church of Salem	First Methodist Episcopal Church of Salem	May 9, 1983 (#83002162)	600 State Street; 44°56′20″N 123°02′08″W	Salem	
44	Gaiety Hill – Bush's Pasture Park Historic District	Gaiety Hill – Bush's Pasture Park Historic District	October 10, 1986 (#86002849)	Roughly bounded by Pringle Creek, Mission Street, Bush's Pasture Park, and Cross, High, and Liberty Streets; 44°55′50″N 123°02′11″W	Salem	
45	Gaiety Hollow	Gaiety Hollow	December 16, 2014 (#14000895)	545 Mission Street, SE; 44°55′58″N 123°02′24″W	Salem	Includes both the home and the six gardens of Edith Schryver and Elizabeth Lord, who were landscape architects. The pair started the first landscape architecture firm owned by women in the Pacific Northwest, Lord & Schryver, and used the gardens to test new concepts.
46	Gallon House Bridge	Gallon House Bridge	November 29, 1979 (#79002124)	Abiqua Creek; 45°01′56″N 122°47′53″W	Silverton vicinity	
47	R.C. Geer Farmhouse	R.C. Geer Farmhouse	February 12, 1980 (#80003353)	12390 Sunnyview Road, NE; 44°56′28″N 122°48′26″W	Salem vicinity	
48	Andrew T. Gilbert House	Andrew T. Gilbert House	November 6, 1980 (#80003350)	116 Marion Street, NE; 44°56′43″N 123°02′28″W	Salem	
49	J. K. Gill Building	J. K. Gill Building	February 1, 1980 (#80003351)	356 State Street; 44°56′24″N 123°02′23″W	Salem	
50	Gordon House	Gordon House	September 22, 2004 (#04001066)	879 W Main Street; 44°59′55″N 122°47′36″W	Silverton	
51	Benjamin F. Harding House	Benjamin F. Harding House	December 21, 1981 (#81000507)	1043 High Street, SE; 44°55′51″N 123°02′29″W	Salem	
52	Hinkle–Reid House	Hinkle–Reid House	January 21, 1994 (#93001503)	525 NE Alder Street; 44°45′18″N 122°28′14″W	Mill City	
53	Hobson–Gehlen General Merchandise Store	Hobson–Gehlen General Merchandise Store	May 22, 2013 (#13000311)	189 N. 2nd Avenue; 44°47′47″N 122°47′37″W	Stayton	
54	Hudson's Bay Company Granary and Clerk's House Site	Hudson's Bay Company Granary and Clerk's House Site	October 31, 1991 (#91001574)	Address restricted	St. Paul	Built as an attempt by HBC to keep locals trading with HBC and not to take business to the Vancouver area.
55	Daniel B. Jarman House and Garden	Daniel B. Jarman House and Garden	December 6, 1979 (#79002120)	567 High Street, SE; 44°56′06″N 123°02′24″W	Salem	
56	Jefferson Methodist Church	Jefferson Methodist Church	November 6, 1980 (#80003346)	310–342 N. 2nd Street; 44°43′12″N 123°00′38″W	Jefferson	
57	Jones–Sherman House	Jones–Sherman House	December 21, 1981 (#81000508)	835 D Street, NE; 44°56′49″N 123°01′38″W	Salem	
58	Thomas Kay Woolen Mill	Thomas Kay Woolen Mill	May 8, 1973 (#73001579)	1313 Mill Street, SE; 44°56′06″N 123°01′38″W	Salem	Included in the Mission Mill Museum.
59	John W. and Thomas F. Kirk House	John W. and Thomas F. Kirk House	June 17, 1987 (#87000867)	4686 St. Paul Highway, NE; 45°12′30″N 122°57′59″W	St. Paul	
60	Frederick S. Lamport House	Frederick S. Lamport House	June 19, 1991 (#91000806)	590 Lower Ben Lomond Drive, SE; 44°55′01″N 123°02′26″W	Salem	
61	Lee Mission Cemetery	Lee Mission Cemetery	December 29, 1978 (#78002299)	D Street; 44°56′34″N 123°00′35″W	Salem	
62	Jason Lee House	Jason Lee House	April 23, 1973 (#73001580)	260 12th Street, SE; 44°56′02″N 123°01′39″W	Salem	Included in the Mission Mill Museum.
63	T. A. Livesley House	T. A. Livesley House	April 26, 1990 (#90000684)	533 Lincoln Street, S 44°55′33″N 123°03′02″W	Salem	
64	S. A. Manning Building	S. A. Manning Building	February 10, 1987 (#87000035)	200–210 State Street; 44°56′26″N 123°02′31″W	Salem	
65	Marion County Housing Committee Demonstration House	Marion County Housing Committee Demonstration House	August 11, 1988 (#88001243)	140 Wilson Street, S 44°55′41″N 123°02′41″W	Salem	
66	McCallister–Gash Farmhouse	McCallister–Gash Farmhouse	November 6, 1980 (#80003354)	9626 Kaufman Road; 44°58′06″N 122°51′50″W	Silverton vicinity	
67	David McCully House	David McCully House	February 14, 1978 (#78002300)	1365 John Street, S 44°55′40″N 123°03′01″W	Salem	
68	Methodist Mission Parsonage	Methodist Mission Parsonage	December 31, 1974 (#74001701)	1313 Mill Street, SE; 44°56′02″N 123°01′39″W	Salem	Included in the Mission Mill Museum.
69	Mill City Southern Pacific Rail Road (SPRR) Bridge	Mill City Southern Pacific Rail Road (SPRR) Bridge	June 22, 2021 (#100006686)	Spanning the North Santiam River; 44°45′19″N 122°28′40″W	Mill City	
70	Mill Place House Site		June 23, 2025 (#100011951)	Address Restricted	Salem	
71	Miller Cemetery Church	Miller Cemetery Church	August 10, 1978 (#78002304)	Cascade Highway, NE; 45°02′21″N 122°43′46″W	Silverton vicinity	
72	John and Douglas Minto Houses	John and Douglas Minto Houses	December 18, 1981 (#81000509)	821–841 Saginaw Street, S 44°55′58″N 123°02′44″W	Salem	
73	Joseph Henry Moser Barn	Joseph Henry Moser Barn	June 14, 2013 (#13000396)	507 S. 3rd Street; 45°00′13″N 122°46′37″W	Silverton	
74	Carl E. Nelson House	Carl E. Nelson House	June 13, 1997 (#97000587)	960 E Street, NE; 44°56′50″N 123°01′30″W	Salem	
75	Odd Fellows Rural Cemetery	Odd Fellows Rural Cemetery	September 11, 2013 (#13000707)	2201 Commercial Street, SE; 44°55′12″N 123°02′52″W	Salem	
76	Olallie Meadows Guard Station	Olallie Meadows Guard Station	May 26, 2015 (#15000272)	Mount Hood National Forest; 44°51′33″N 121°46′23″W	Estacada vicinity	
77	Old First National Bank Building	Old First National Bank Building	October 9, 1986 (#86002851)	388 State Street; 44°56′23″N 123°02′21″W	Salem	
78	Old Garfield School	Old Garfield School	December 2, 1981 (#81000510)	528 Cottage Street, NE; 44°56′37″N 123°01′53″W	Salem	
79	Old Woodburn City Hall	Old Woodburn City Hall	March 30, 1979 (#79002125)	550 N 1st Street; 45°08′39″N 122°51′21″W	Woodburn	
80	Oregon Pacific Railroad Linear Historic District	Oregon Pacific Railroad Linear Historic District	October 29, 1999 (#99001285)	Roughly a 20-mile linear section of the old railroad grade between Idanha and the Cascade Range summit (See also Linn and Jefferson counties.); 44°27′10″N 121°53′57″W	Idanha to the Cascade Range summit via Santiam Junction	Beginning in 1872, the colorful Thomas Egenton Hogg set out to build a transcontinental railroad terminating in the Oregon Coast. By the time of his venture's final bankruptcy in 1894, completed track reached only from Yaquina Bay to Idanha in the Cascade foothills, with grade work under way east of Idanha to the summit. The historic district protects the remaining signs of the grade work east of Idanha, as well as the sites of two construction camps. Abandoned part way through construction, these remnants provide a unique window onto construction methods and living conditions in 19th century railroad camps.
81	Oregon State Capitol	Oregon State Capitol	June 29, 1988 (#88001055)	Capitol Mall; 44°56′18″N 123°01′49″W	Salem	
82	Oregon State Fair Stadium and Poultry Building Ensemble	Oregon State Fair Stadium and Poultry Building Ensemble	June 20, 2002 (#02000671)	2330 17th Street, NE; 44°57′29″N 123°00′41″W	Salem	
83	Oregon State Forester's Office Building	Oregon State Forester's Office Building	April 15, 1982 (#82003738)	2600 State Street; 44°55′53″N 123°00′27″W	Salem	
84	Oregon State Hospital Historic District	Oregon State Hospital Historic District	February 28, 2008 (#08000118)	2600 Center Street, NE; 44°56′24″N 123°00′13″W	Salem	Boundary decrease approved August 23, 2019.
85	Christopher Paulus Building	Christopher Paulus Building	March 5, 1992 (#92000133)	355–363 Court Street, NE; 44°56′29″N 123°02′20″W	Salem	
86	Edgar T. Pierce House	Edgar T. Pierce House	February 21, 1997 (#97000136)	1610 Fir Street, S 44°55′30″N 123°02′49″W	Salem	
87	Pleasant Grove Presbyterian Church	Pleasant Grove Presbyterian Church	August 7, 1974February 10, 1987 (relisted) (#74001703)	1313 Mill Street, SE; 44°56′02″N 123°01′39″W	Salem	Included in the Mission Mill Museum. Delisted due to relocation September 1984. Relisted in 1987.
88	Dr. Luke A. Port House	Dr. Luke A. Port House	October 2, 1973 (#73001581)	1116 Mission Street, SE; 44°55′48″N 123°01′54″W	Salem	
89	Port–Manning House	Port–Manning House	October 2, 1978 (#78002301)	4922 Halls Ferry Road, S 44°52′51″N 123°07′53″W	Salem	
90	Queen of Angels Priory	Queen of Angels Priory	July 8, 1982 (#82003736)	840 S Main Street; 45°03′43″N 122°48′10″W	Mount Angel	
91	Reed Opera House and McCornack Block Addition	Reed Opera House and McCornack Block Addition	March 8, 1978 (#78002302)	177–189 Liberty Street, NE; 44°56′28″N 123°02′20″W	Salem	
92	Dr. and Mrs. Charles G. Robertson House and Garden	Dr. and Mrs. Charles G. Robertson House and Garden	May 19, 1983 (#83002163)	460 Leffelle Street, S 44°55′34″N 123°02′59″W	Salem	
93	St. Mary's Roman Catholic Church	St. Mary's Roman Catholic Church	October 22, 1976 (#76001583)	575 E College Street; 45°04′03″N 122°47′38″W	Mount Angel	
94	St. Paul Historic District	St. Paul Historic District	March 15, 1982 (#82003739)	45°12′35″N 122°58′34″W	St. Paul	
95	St. Paul Roman Catholic Church	St. Paul Roman Catholic Church	October 16, 1979 (#79002098)	Junction of Christie Street and Mission Avenue, NE; 45°12′43″N 122°58′42″W	St. Paul	
96	Salem Civic Center Historic District	Salem Civic Center Historic District	November 2, 2022 (#100008330)	555 Liberty St. SE; 44°56′10″N 123°02′28″W	Salem	
97	Salem Downtown State Street – Commercial Street Historic District	Salem Downtown State Street – Commercial Street Historic District	September 28, 2001 (#01001067)	Roughly bounded by Ferry, High, Chemeketa, and Front Streets; 44°56′24″N 123°02′22″W	Salem	Located on the Willamette River transportation corridor and near Jason Lee's Mission Mill, Salem's central business district was first platted in 1846. Subsequent development patterns closely reflected the drivers of Salem's growth as an important agricultural and commercial center. Surviving buildings represent a wide range of architectural styles from the 1860s through the 1950s.
98	Salem Southern Pacific Railroad Station	Salem Southern Pacific Railroad Station	February 12, 2010 (#10000015)	500 13th Avenue, SE; 44°55′56″N 123°01′42″W	Salem	This grand Beaux-Arts style train station, completed in 1918, is the third station to occupy the same site. The adjacent REA freight terminal is a remnant of the 1889 Queen Anne station that burned in 1917. In 1999, the buildings were restored to their appearance during the first half of the 20th century. The site has been in continuous use for passenger rail service from 1871 through at least 2009.
99	William Riley Scheurer House	William Riley Scheurer House	December 23, 1981 (#81000503)	23707 1st Street, NE; 45°15′44″N 122°50′37″W	Butteville	Located in Butteville along the Willamette River.
100	Jesse H. Settlemier House	Jesse H. Settlemier House	December 19, 1974 (#74001704)	355 N. Settlemier Avenue; 45°08′41″N 122°51′43″W	Woodburn	
101	U. G. Shipley House and Garden	U. G. Shipley House and Garden	October 14, 1994 (#94001219)	260 Washington Street, S 44°55′27″N 123°02′48″W	Salem	
102	Silver Creek Youth Camp – Silver Falls State Park		June 20, 2002 (#02000673)	20024 Silver Falls Highway; 44°51′23″N 122°36′36″W	Sublimity vicinity	
103	Silver Falls State Park Concession Building Area	Silver Falls State Park Concession Building Area	June 30, 1983 (#83002164)	20024 Silver Falls Highway; 44°52′45″N 122°39′23″W	Sublimity vicinity	
104	Silverton Commercial Historic District	Silverton Commercial Historic District	July 29, 1987 (#87000878)	Roughly bounded by High and Oak Streets, Silver Creek, and Lewis, Water, and 1st Streets; 45°00′19″N 122°46′59″W	Silverton	These 27 buildings in Silverton's downtown core, dating from between 1870 and 1936, recall the twin stories of water power and commercial development in this small Willamette Valley town.
105	Smith–Ohmart House	Smith–Ohmart House	November 16, 1979 (#79002121)	2655 East Nob Hill Street, SE; 44°54′57″N 123°02′37″W	Salem	
106	Peter and Bertha Soderberg House	Peter and Bertha Soderberg House	June 14, 2013 (#13000397)	1106 Pine Street; 45°00′40″N 122°47′32″W	Silverton	
107	South First National Bank Block	South First National Bank Block	March 31, 1983 (#83002165)	241–247 Commercial Street, NE; 44°56′32″N 123°02′24″W	Salem	
108	Starkey–McCully Block	Starkey–McCully Block	March 12, 1979 (#79002122)	223–233 Commercial Street, NE; 44°56′31″N 123°02′24″W	Salem	
109	State Library of Oregon	State Library of Oregon	April 21, 2022 (#100007638)	250 Winter St. NE; 44°56′24″N 123°01′51″W	Salem	
110	John Stauffer House and Barn	John Stauffer House and Barn	May 1, 1974 (#74001698)	13551 Stauffer Road, NE; 45°11′42″N 122°47′02″W	Hubbard	
111	C. C. Stratton House	C. C. Stratton House	November 15, 1984 (#84000475)	1599 State Street; 44°56′09″N 123°01′17″W	Salem	
112	Supreme Court and Library Building	Supreme Court and Library Building	March 4, 2020 (#100005014)	1163 State Street; 44°56′15″N 123°01′40″W	Salem	
113	Union Street Railroad Bridge and Trestle	Union Street Railroad Bridge and Trestle	January 11, 2006 (#05001520)	Junction of Union and Water Streets, NE (See also Polk County.); 44°56′50″N 123°02′31″W	Salem	
114	Victor Point School	Victor Point School	September 27, 1996 (#96001050)	1156 Victor Point Road, SE; 44°54′59″N 122°45′19″W	Silverton vicinity	
115	William Lincoln Wade House	William Lincoln Wade House	February 17, 1978 (#78002303)	1305 John Street, S 44°55′41″N 123°03′01″W	Salem	
116	Waller Hall, Willamette University	Waller Hall, Willamette University	November 20, 1975 (#75001593)	900 State Street; 44°56′14″N 123°01′52″W	Salem	
117	Willamette Station Site, Methodist Mission in Oregon	Willamette Station Site, Methodist Mission in Oregon	August 1, 1984 (#84003040)	10991 Wheatland Ferry Road; 45°05′03″N 123°02′33″W	Gervais vicinity	
118	Windischar's General Blacksmith Shop	Windischar's General Blacksmith Shop	November 7, 1980 (#80003347)	110 Sheridan Street; 45°04′04″N 122°47′48″W	Mount Angel	
119	T. M. and Emma Witten Drug Store – House	T. M. and Emma Witten Drug Store – House	August 12, 1999 (#99001002)	104 N Main Street; 44°43′04″N 123°00′42″W	Jefferson	
120	Robert Witzel House	Robert Witzel House	November 15, 1979 (#79002123)	6576 Joseph Street, SE; 44°53′07″N 122°55′40″W	Salem	
121	Casper Zorn Farmhouse	Casper Zorn Farmhouse	February 12, 1980 (#80003355)	8448 Champoeg Road, NE; 45°14′44″N 122°53′11″W	St. Paul vicinity	

== Former listings ==
	Name on the Register	Image	Date listed	Date removed	Location	City or town	Description
1	Breitenbush Guard Station		April 8, 1986 (#86000843)	February 7, 2011	Willamette National Forest; 44°46′54″N 121°58′03″W	Detroit vicinity	Destroyed by fire on April 14, 2000.
2	George F. McCorkle House	George F. McCorkle House	December 24, 1974 (#74001702)	February 1, 1984	W of Silverton	Silverton	Removed due to significant historic alteration of the building.
3	Paris Woollen Mill		December 21, 1981 (#81000511)	December 24, 2008	535 E Florence Street	Stayton	Demolished in 2003.
4	Wilson–Durbin House	Wilson–Durbin House	November 7, 1980 (#80003352)	April 15, 1991	434 Water Street (former)	Salem	This Gothic revival house was built in 1861, and was destroyed by fire on December 9, 1990. The Salem community built a replica of the house on the same site in 1999, which was incorporated into A.C. Gilbert's Discovery Village.

== See also ==
- National Register of Historic Places listings in Oregon
- Listings in neighboring counties: Clackamas, Jefferson, Linn, Polk, Wasco, Yamhill
- Historic preservation
- History of Oregon
- Lists of Oregon-related topics
