= Double Falls (Oregon) =

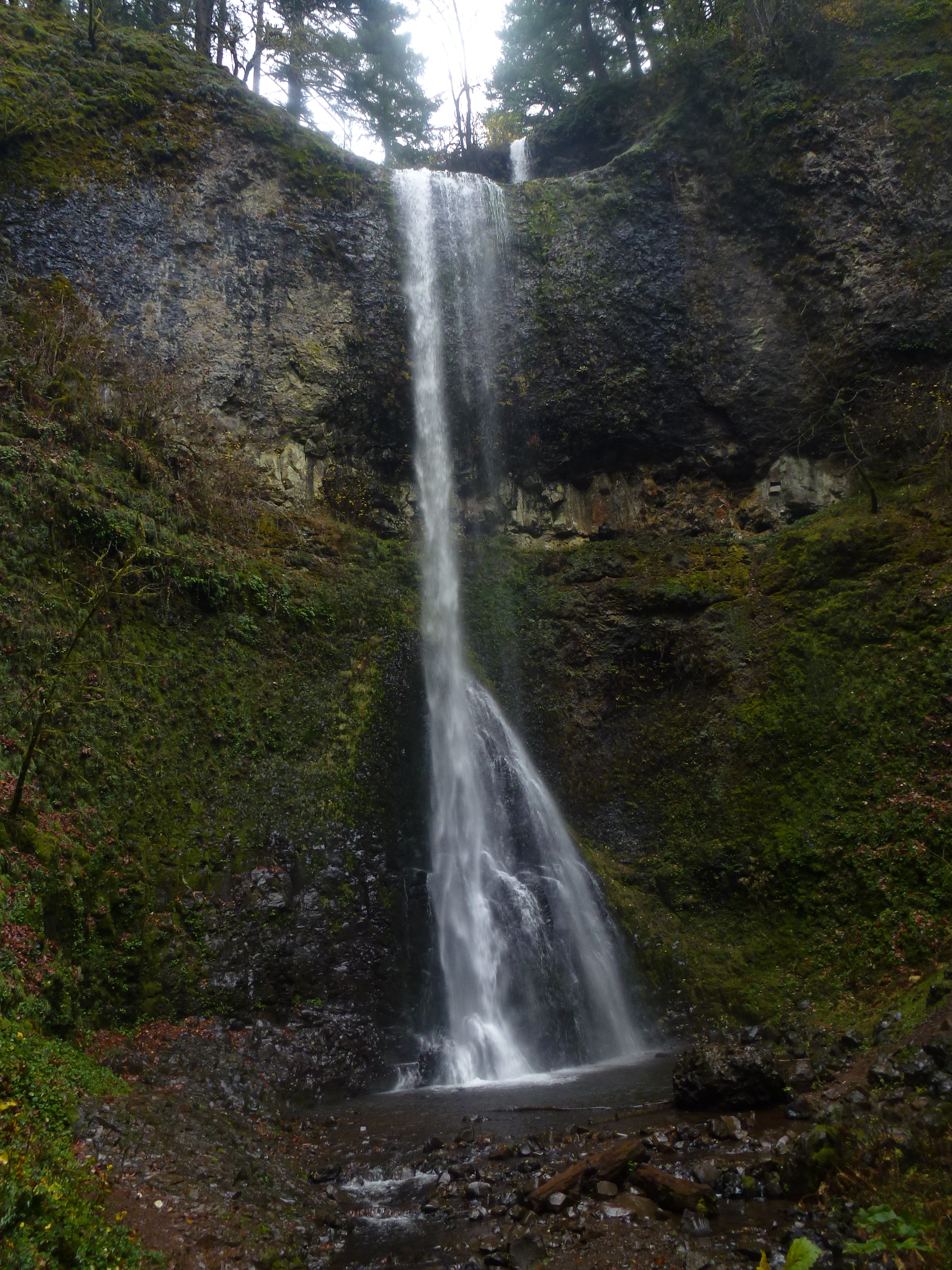
- Double Falls in autumn
- Interactive map of Double Falls
- Location: Silver Falls State Park
- Coordinates: 44.89197°N 122.64499°W
- Type: Plunge
- Elevation: 1,236 ft (377 m)
- Total height: 184 ft (56 m)
- Average flow rate: 3 cu ft/s (0.1 m^{3}/s)

Double Falls, is a waterfall located in the Silver Falls State Park about 23 miles east of Salem,, in Marion County, in the U.S. state of Oregon. It is located on the west foothills where Mount Hood National Forest meets with the Middle Santiam Wilderness.

Several prominent waterfalls are located in the park along the Trail of Ten Falls, including South Falls, Drake Falls, Middle North Falls, and Winter Falls.

== Location ==
Double Falls is the tallest of the waterfalls in Silver Falls State Park. It is located along the Trail of Ten Falls, along Canyon Trail, a couple hundred yards from Lower North Falls. Double Falls is not a product of Silver Creek but one of its tributaries, Hullt Creek, located a short distance upstream from where it merges with the North Fork Silver Creek.

== See also ==
- List of waterfalls
- List of waterfalls in Oregon
