= Twin Falls (Oregon) =

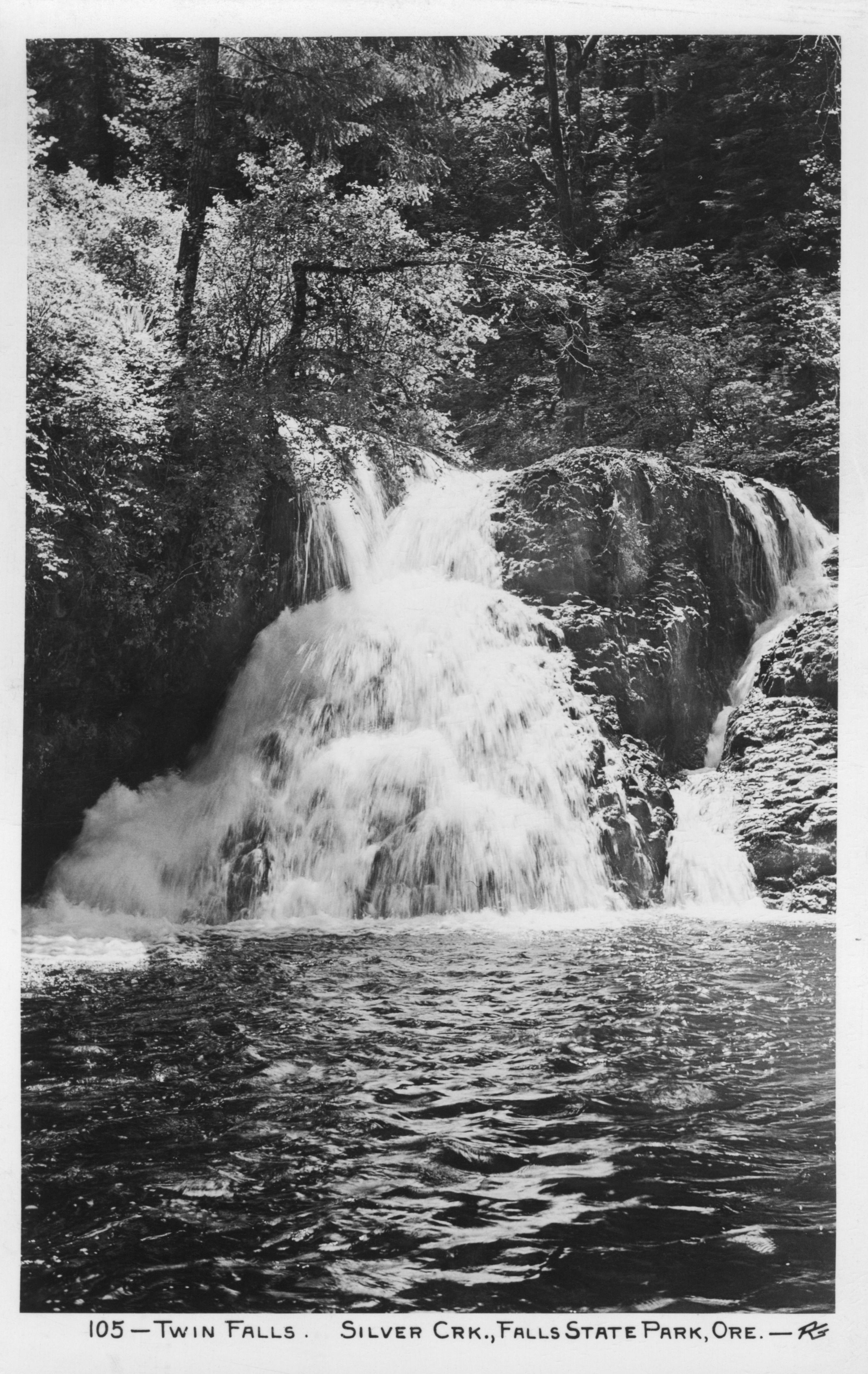
- Twin Falls in the Spring
- Interactive map of Twin Falls
- Location: Silver Falls State Park
- Coordinates: 44.88518°N 122.63702°W
- Type: Plunge
- Elevation: 1,237 ft (377 m)
- Total height: 31 ft (9.4 m)
- Average flow rate: 100 cu ft/s (2.8 m^{3}/s)

Twin Falls is a waterfall located in the Silver Falls State Park at the east end of the city of Salem, in Marion County, in the U.S. state of Oregon. It is located in the west foothills where Mount Hood National Forest meets with the Middle Santiam Wilderness. Several prominent waterfalls are located in the Park along Trail of Ten Falls: South Falls, Drake Falls, Lower South Falls, and Winter Falls—among others.

== Location ==
Twin Falls is created along the course of North Fork of Silver Creek and it sits on the east section of Silver Falls State Park Trail of Ten Falls, along Canyon Trail towards North Falls Trail, approximately a quarter mile of Middle North Falls. It received its name because in the spring it splits into two channels.

== Description ==
Twin Falls is the third smallest along the Trail of Ten Falls and can't be fully viewed from the official view point on Canyon Trail. The falls drops into two channels over an angled basalt ledge, creating two veiling curtains approximately 31 feet (9 m) high. The far side channel will reduce its flow during the summer and becomes nearly impossible to visualize as it runs so close to its adjacent cliff.

== See also ==
- List of waterfalls in Oregon
