= Upper North Falls =

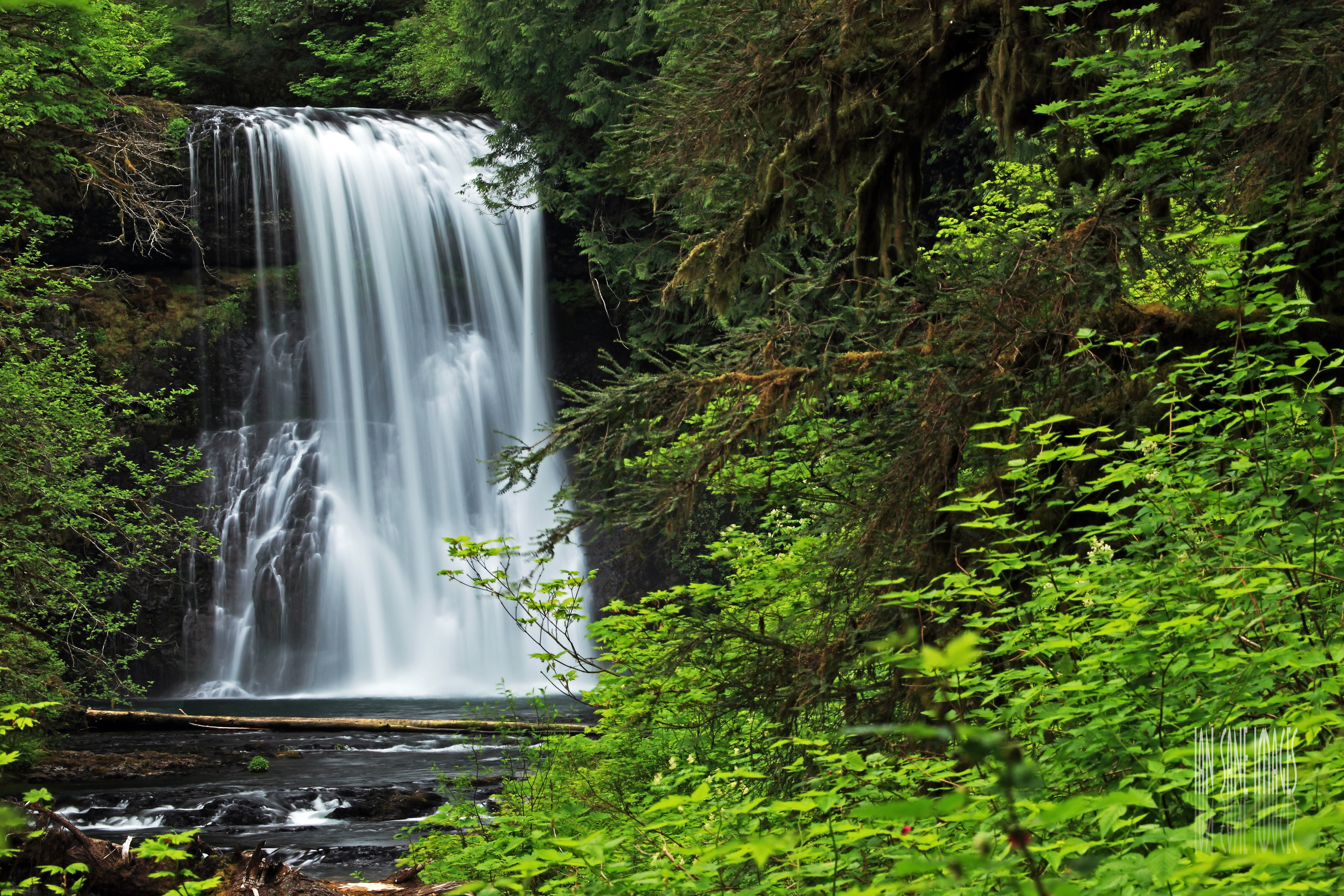
- Upper North Falls in the Spring
- Interactive map of Upper North Falls
- Location: Silver Falls State Park
- Coordinates: 44.88313°N 122.61415°W
- Type: Plunge
- Elevation: 1,563 ft (476 m)
- Total height: 65 ft (20 m)
- Average flow rate: 100 cu ft/s (2.8 m^{3}/s)

Upper North Falls, is a waterfall located in the Silver Falls State Park at the east end of the city of Salem, in Marion County, in the U.S. state of Oregon. It is located in a privileged area on the west foothills where Mount Hood National Forest meets with the Middle Santiam Wilderness. Several prominent waterfalls are located in the Park along Trail of Ten Falls: South Falls, Drake Falls, Lower North Falls, and Winter Falls—among others.

== Location ==
Upper North Falls is created along the course of North Fork of Silver Creek and it sits on the east section of Silver Falls State Park Trail of Ten Falls, along North Falls Trail, approximately a quarter mile of North Falls.

== See also ==
- List of waterfalls in Oregon
