= Calvary Lutheran Church =

Calvary Lutheran Church may refer to:

- Calvary Lutheran Church (Minneapolis)
- Calvary Lutheran Church and Parsonage (Silverton, Oregon)
