= Port–Manning House =

Historic house in Oregon, United States

- U.S. National Register of Historic Places
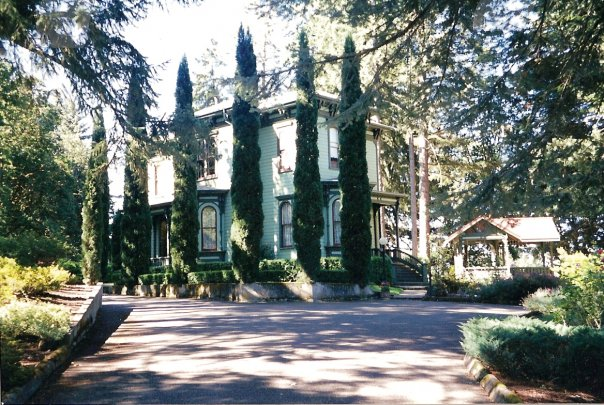
- The Port–Manning House in 2006

- Location within Oregon Location within the United States
- Location: 4922 Halls Ferry Road South; Salem, Oregon
- Coordinates: 44°52′51″N 123°07′53″W
- Area: 4.1 acres (1.7 ha)
- Built: 1884
- Architectural style: Italian Villa
- NRHP reference No.: 78002301
- Added to NRHP: October 2, 1978

The Port–Manning House is a historic home in Salem, Oregon, United States. The house was built in 1884 by Dr. Luke A. Port. The house was designed after the Italianate Victorian style. Under threat of demolition, it was moved from its downtown location to south of the city of Salem in 1972.

The house was listed on the National Register of Historic Places in 1978.

== See also ==
- National Register of Historic Places listings in Marion County, Oregon
