= Donaca Lake =

Lake in Oregon, United States

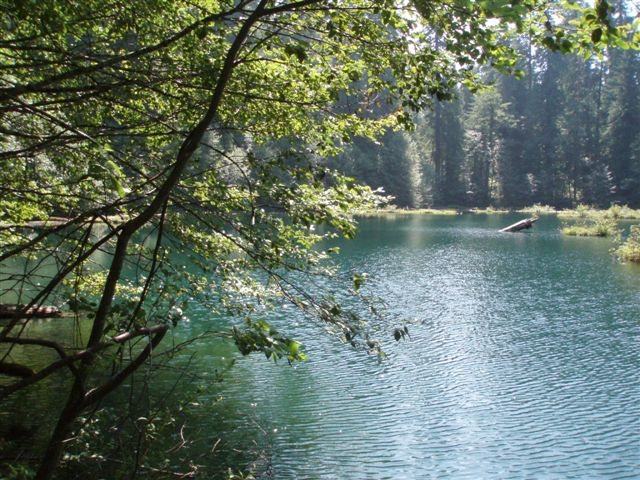

- Location within Oregon Location within the United States
- Location: Linn County, Oregon
- Coordinates: 44°31′46.99″N 122°11′8.02″W
- Basin countries: United States
- Max. depth: 41 ft (12 m)
- Surface elevation: 2,700 ft (820 m)

Donaca Lake is a 3-acre (12,000 m^{2}), 41-foot (12 m) deep lake in Linn County, Oregon, United States. It lies at an elevation of 2,700 feet (820 m). The lake can be accessed via two different trails, one from the south and one from the north. The lake is located within an old growth forest in the Middle Santiam Wilderness near Sweet Home.

Donaca Lake provides habitat for a unique strain of cutthroat trout and affords excellent fishing for lively 8-to-12-inch (20 to 30 cm) specimens. Though not required by law, catch and release methods are encouraged to protect this fishery.

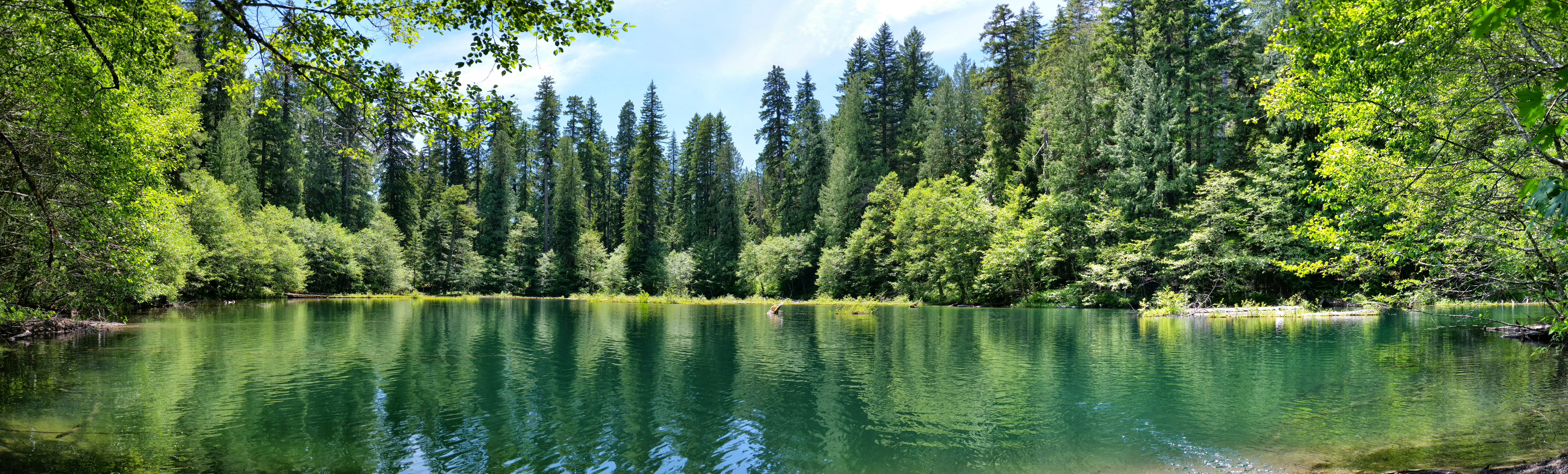
View of Donaca Lake

== See also ==
- List of lakes in Oregon
