= A. C. Gilbert's Discovery Village =

- Andrew T. Gilbert House
- U.S. National Register of Historic Places
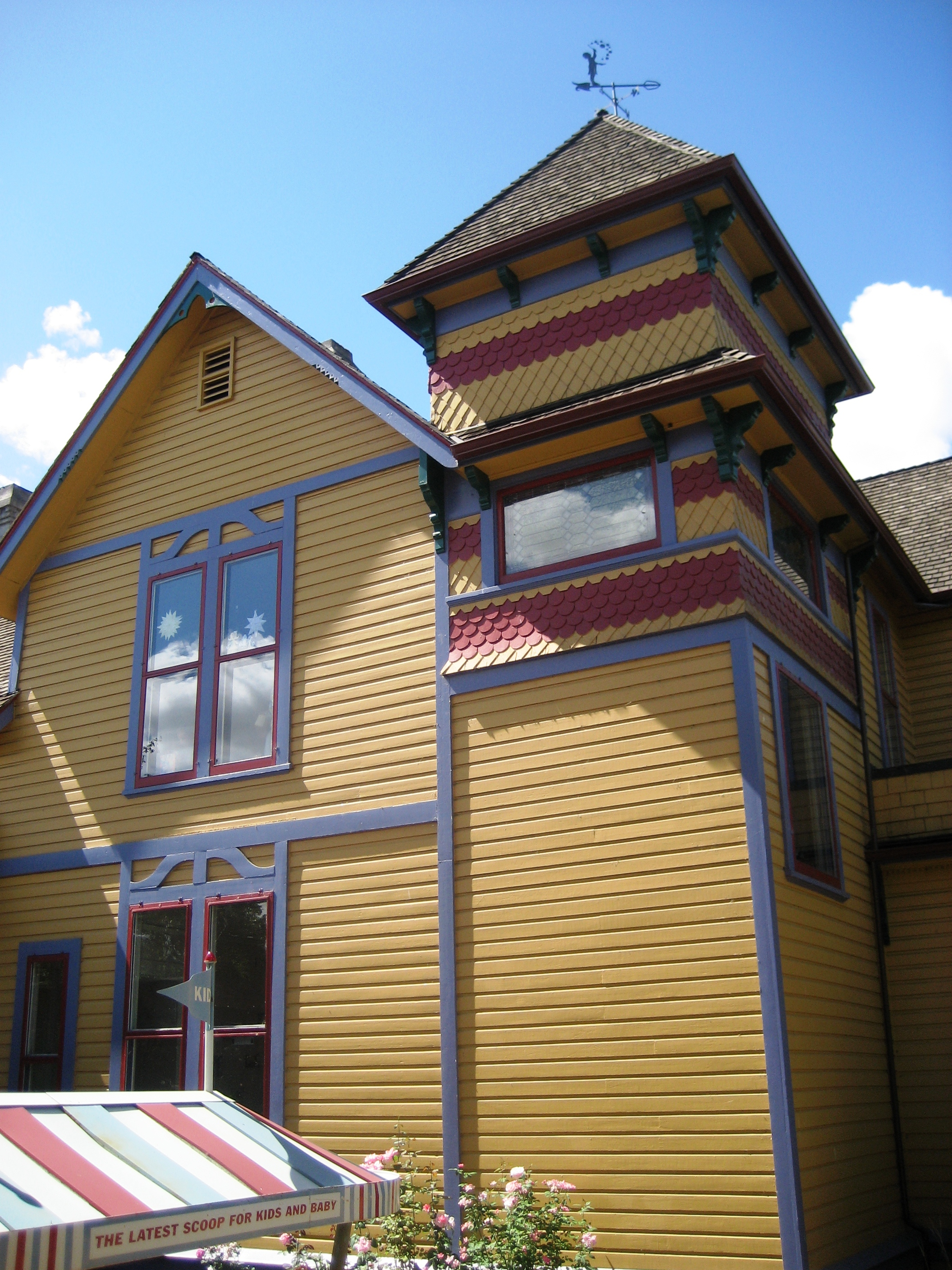

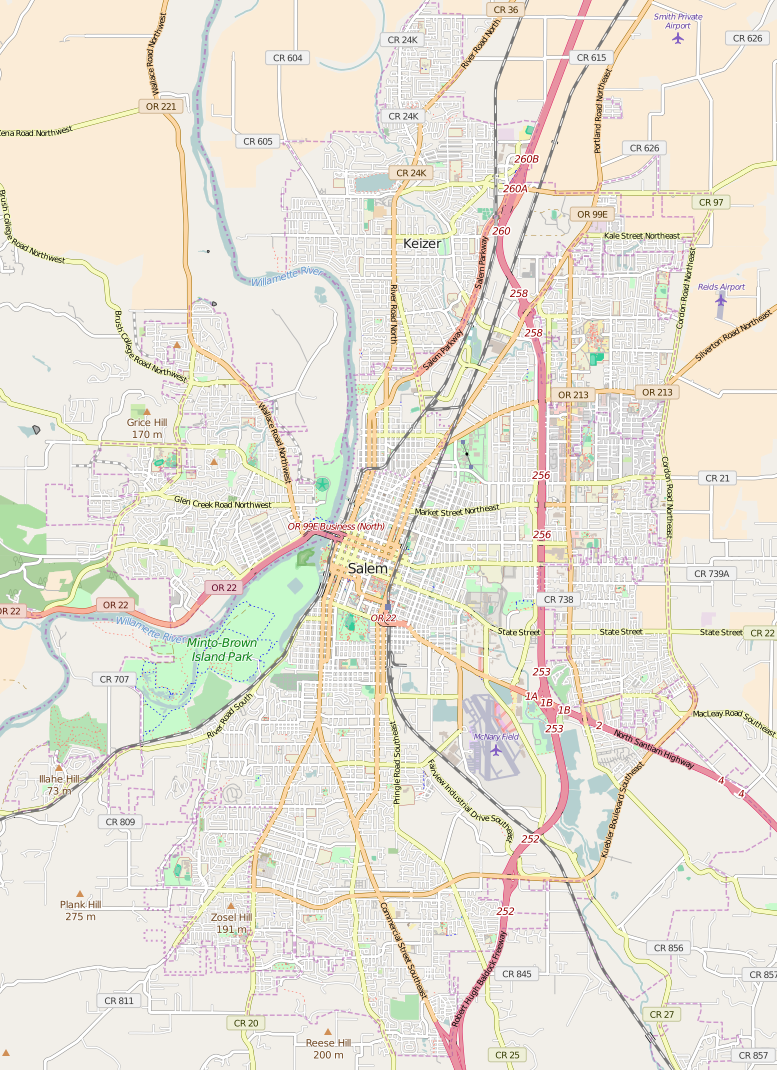
- Location within Salem OR Location within Oregon
- Location: 116 Marion St., NE, Salem, Oregon
- Coordinates: 44°56′42″N 123°2′28″W
- Area: 0.2 acres (0.081 ha)
- Built: 1887
- Architect: Charles A. Robert
- Architectural style: Queen Anne
- NRHP reference No.: 80003350
- Added to NRHP: November 06, 1980

The Gilbert House Children's Museum is a private nonprofit 501(c)(3) children's museum within Riverfront Park located in Salem, Oregon, United States. Founded in 1989.

The museum has 16 hands-on S.T.E.A.M. exhibits, a 20,000 ft^{2} Outdoor Discovery Area, field trips, STEM Workshops, membership opportunities, summer camps, and educational programs in the sciences, arts, and humanities. This hands-on museum was named in honor of American inventor Alfred Carlton Gilbert and displays several of his inventions, most notably the Erector Set. In fact, the Museum is home to the world's largest Erector Set tower at 52 feet. Originally home to the National Toy Hall of Fame, the museum sold the Hall of Fame to the Strong - National Museum of Play in 2002.

Besides its interactive exhibits, Gilbert House Children's Museum also provides summer camps, birthday party packages, and outreach programs.

The museum is housed in several historic Victorian buildings, including the Andrew T. Gilbert House, which is listed on the National Register of Historic Places (NRHP), and a 1998 replica of the Wilson-Durbin House, which was also NRHP-listed until it was destroyed by fire in 1990.

== Exhibits ==
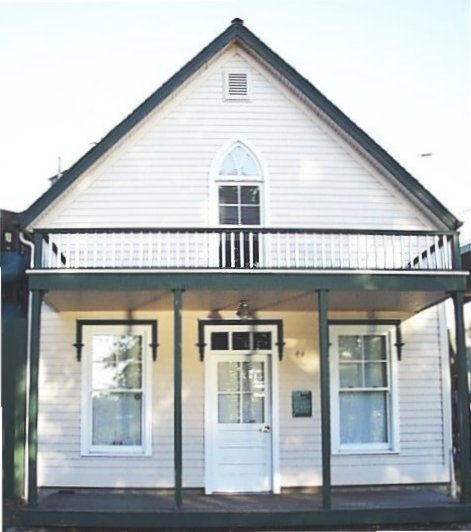
Replica of the Wilson-Durbin House

- Outdoor Discovery Area, including the Erector Set Tower – A 52 feet high erector set tower; the largest in the world. There are also 3 giant slides and a maze.
- Farm to Table
- All About Me
- The Creative Space
- Gilbert Engineering Studio
- Fortopia
- Tinker Tracks
- Vet Clinic
- Grandma's Clubhouse
- Lights! Camera! Action!
- Up, Up and Away
- Salem Station
- Forest Friends Toddler Room
- Main Street
- Recollections
- Eye Euphoria
- A.C. Gilbert's Legacy of Play
- Bill's Bubble Factory
- Natures Workshop
