= June D. Drake House =

- June D Drake House
- U.S. National Register of Historic Places
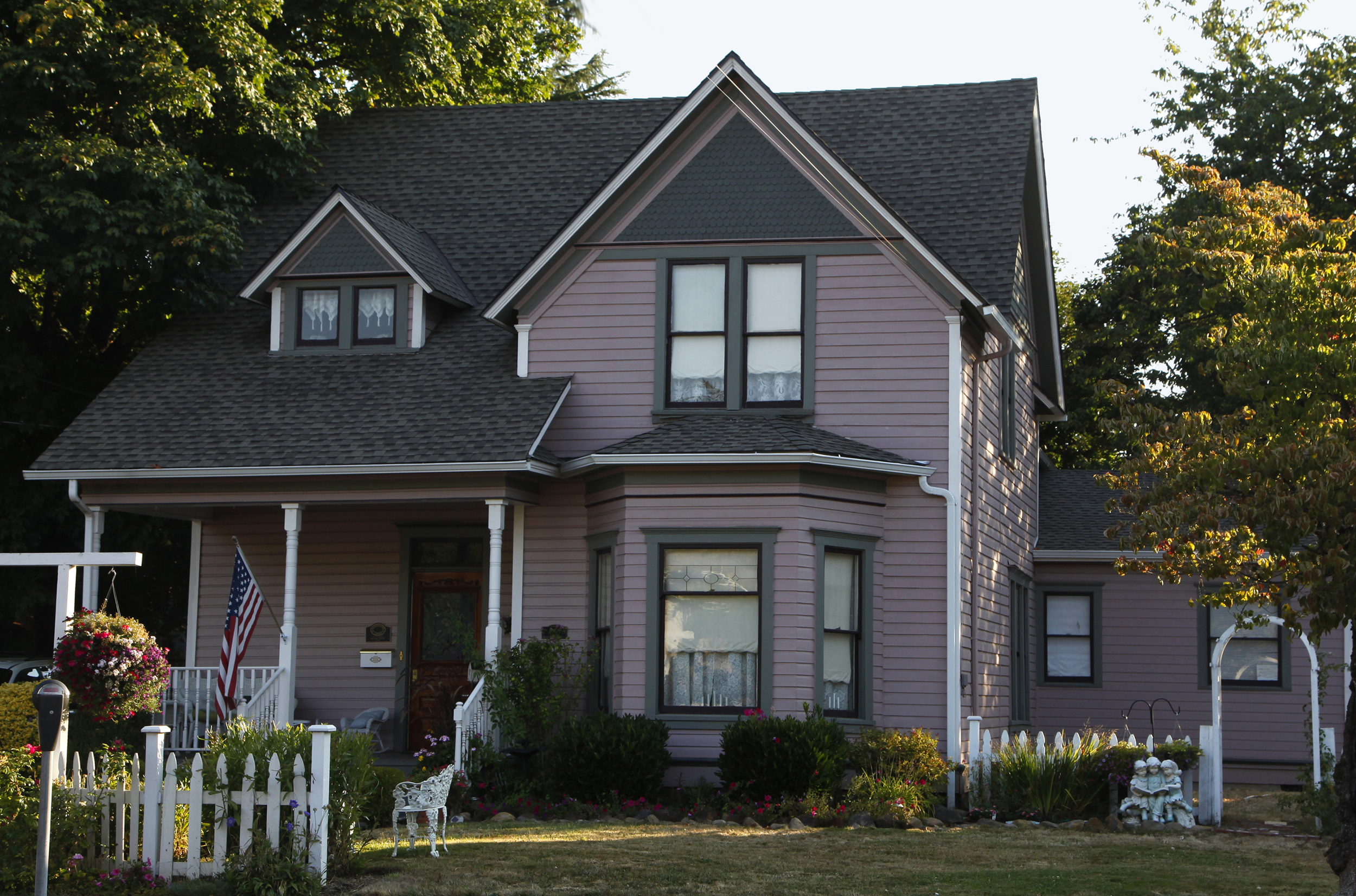

- Location within Oregon Location within the United States
- Location: 409 S. Water Street, Silverton, Oregon
- Coordinates: 45.003333°N 122.781111°W
- Built: 1904
- MPS: Silverton, Oregon, and Its Environs MPS
- NRHP reference No.: 11000078
- Added to NRHP: March 12, 2011

The June D Drake House is a historic house located in Silverton, Marion County, Oregon. It was listed on the National Register of Historic Places on March 12, 2011.

It was the Silverton home of June D Drake (1880-1969; Silverton Chamber of Commerce secretary, Knights of Pythias member, farmer, commercial photographer, and owner of Drake Brothers Studio in Silverton) and his wife Eleanor Mercedes Schoenfeld Drake (1880-1968). He was a prime mover in the establishment of Silver Falls State Park. Their house was deemed historically significant for listing on the National Register partly for its association with him and partly for it serving as a fine local example of "Free-Classic Queen Anne cottage" architecture. It was the first house in Silverton to be electrified in 1904.

It is one of three houses in Silverton listed on the same day.

== See also ==
- Louis J. Adams House
- Murton E. and Lillian DeGuire House
