= Middle North Falls =

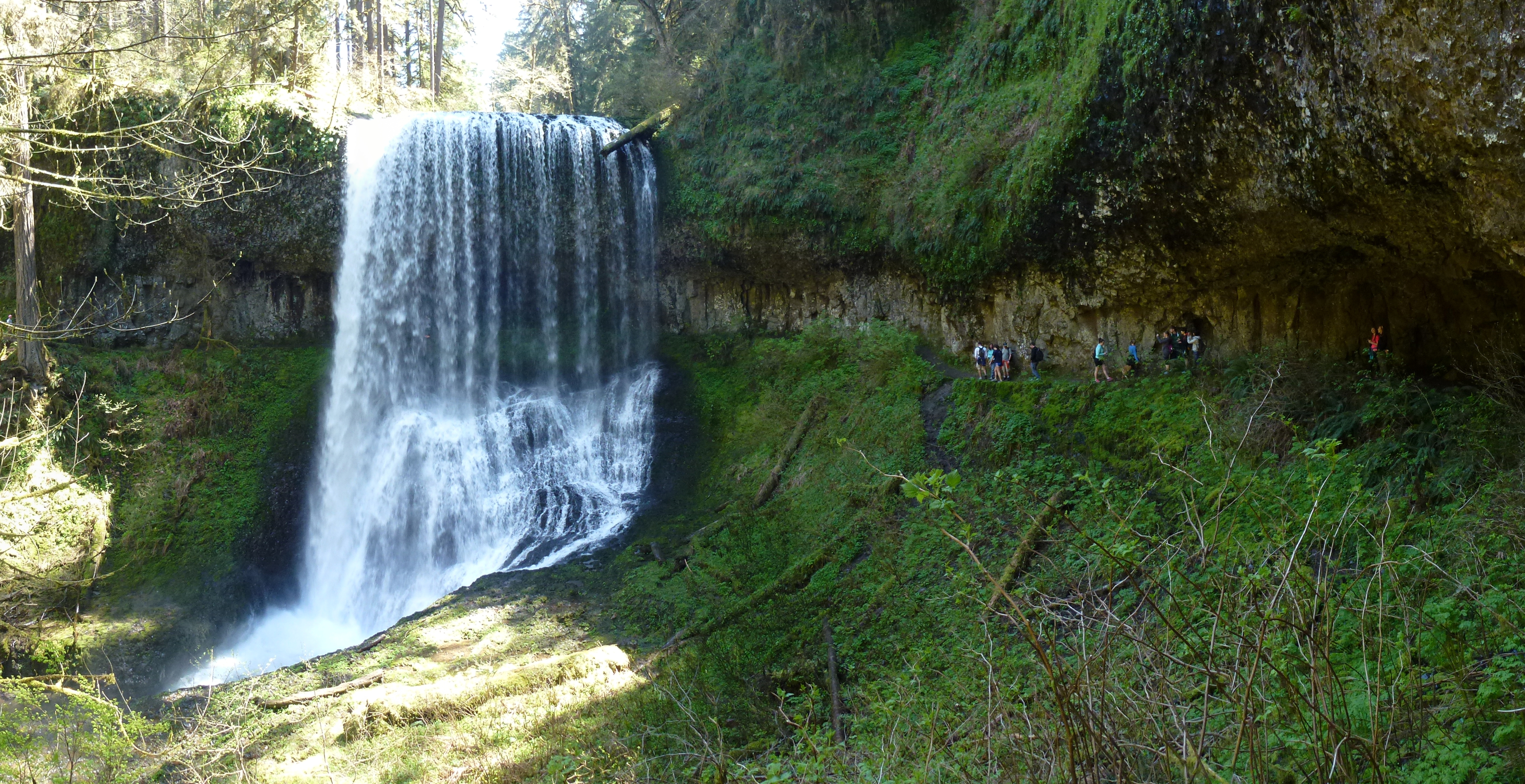
- Middle North Falls panorama
- Interactive map of Middle North Falls
- Location: Silver Falls State Park
- Coordinates: 44.88861°N 122.64306°W
- Type: Plunge
- Elevation: 1,149 ft (350 m)
- Total height: 106 ft (32 m)
- Average flow rate: 100 cu ft/s (2.8 m^{3}/s)

Middle North Falls, is a waterfall located in the Silver Falls State Park at the east end of the city of Salem, in Marion County, in the U.S. state of Oregon. It is located in a privileged area on the west foothills where Mount Hood National Forest meets with the Middle Santiam Wilderness. Several prominent waterfalls are located in the Park along Trail of Ten Falls: South Falls, Lower South Falls, Drake Falls, and Lower North Falls—among others.

== Location ==
Middle North Falls is created along the course of the North Fork Silver Creek and it sits on the north section of Silver Falls State Park Trail of Ten Falls, along Winter Falls Loop. Middle North Falls is one of four waterfalls in the Park that features a separate trail behind waterfall. The trail leading behind Middle North Falls is a dead-end, constructed purely to allow access to additional views of the waterfall.

== See also ==
- List of waterfalls in Oregon
