= Silver Falls State Park =

State park in Oregon, United States

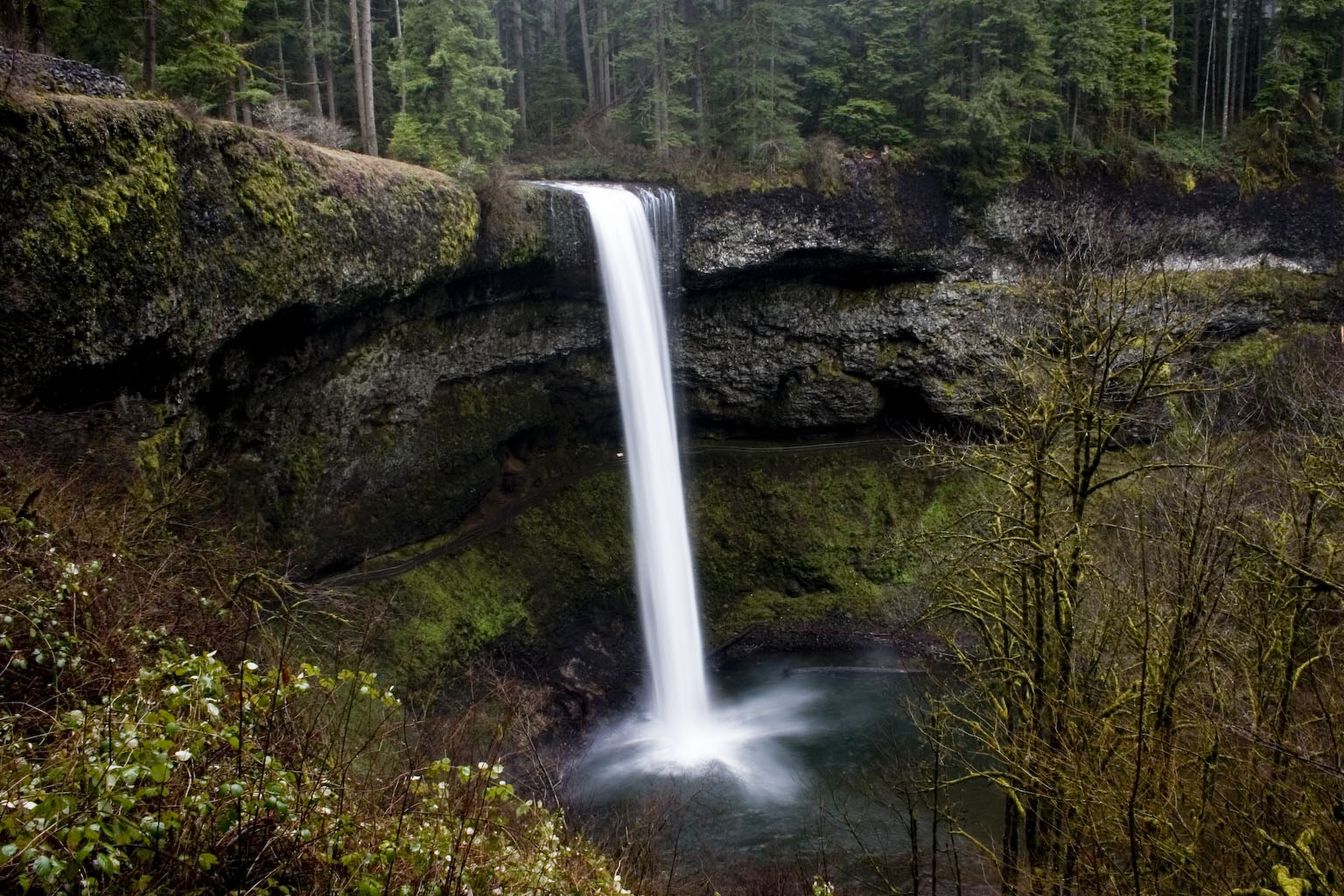
- South Falls

- Location within Oregon Location within the United States
- Type: Public, state
- Location: Marion County, Oregon
- Nearest city: Silverton
- Coordinates: 44°51′04″N 122°38′46″W
- Operator: Oregon Parks and Recreation Department

Silver Falls State Park is a state park in the U.S. state of Oregon, located near Silverton, about 20 miles (32 km) east-southeast of Salem. It is the largest state park in Oregon, with an area of more than 9,000 acres (36 km^{2}), and it includes more than 24 miles (39 km) of walking trails, 14 miles (23 km) of horse trails, and a 4-mile (6.4 km) bike path. Its 7.2-mile (11.6 km) Canyon Trail/Trail of Ten Falls runs along the banks of Silver Creek and by ten waterfalls, from which the park received its name. Four of the ten falls have an amphitheater-like surrounding that allows the trail to pass behind the flow of the falls. The Silver Falls State Park Concession Building Area and the Silver Creek Youth Camp-Silver Falls State Park are separately listed on the U.S. National Register of Historic Places.

The park's most visited waterfall is South Falls, a 177-foot (54 m) cascade. Remote Double Falls, however, is listed as the highest waterfall in the park, plunging 178 feet (54 m) in a small tributary side canyon deep within the Silver Creek Canyon.

In recent years, Silver Falls State Park has hosted star parties in partnership with the amateur astronomy organization in Salem, Oregon called Night Sky 45.

== History ==
- Silver Falls State Park Concession Building Area
- U.S. National Register of Historic Places
- U.S. Historic district
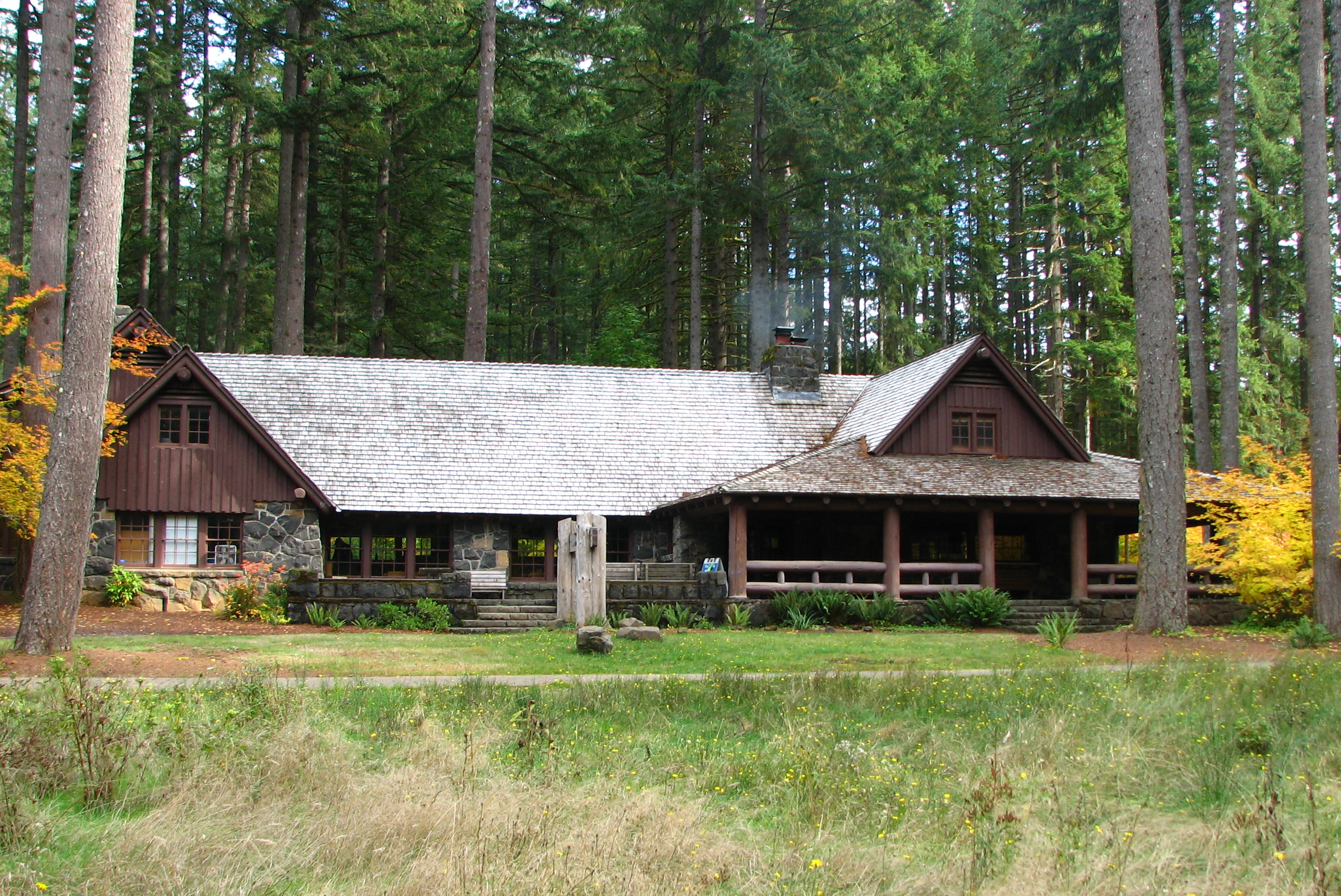
- Silver Falls Lodge
- Nearest city: Sublimity, Oregon
- Built: 1934
- Architect: J. Elwood Isted
- NRHP reference No.: 83002164
- Silver Creek Youth Camp – Silver Falls State Park
- U.S. National Register of Historic Places
- U.S. Historic district
- Nearest city: Sublimity, Oregon
- Coordinates: 44°51′23″N 122°36′31″W
- Built: 1936
- Architect: Keith R. Maguire, Jr.
- Architectural style: National Park Service rustic
- NRHP reference No.: 02000673
- Added to NRHP: June 20, 2002
- Added to NRHP: June 30, 1983

Silver Falls State Park falls within the traditional lands of the Kalapuya and Molala tribes. They were nomadic and relied on game and salmon, as well as vegetation that grew in the fertile soil the area is rich in. The State of Oregon would eventually spend roughly $32,000 to acquire the land for the park but none of that money went to the original inhabitants of the land, who had been forcibly displaced by the European settlers who arrived in the area.

Silver Falls City formed in 1888 and was primarily a logging community with a few homesteaders, and the area was extensively logged. The small lumber town of Silver Falls City sat atop the South Falls, and as the land was cleared, a local entrepreneur sold admission to the Falls area, with attractions such as pushing cars over the falls and even hosting a stunt with a daredevil riding over in a canoe.

In 1902, June D Drake, a commercial photographer and owner of Drake Brothers Studio in Silverton, Oregon, began to campaign for park status, using his photographs of the falls to gain support. Drake Falls was later named for him. In 1926, however, an inspector for the National Park Service rejected the area for park status because of a proliferation of unattractive stumps after years of logging.

In 1935, President Franklin D. Roosevelt announced that the Silver Falls area would be turned into a Recreational Demonstration Area. Private land that had been logged was purchased, and workers in the Civilian Conservation Corps were employed to develop park facilities, including the historic South Falls Lodge, completed in the late 1930s. It was used as a restaurant from 1946 until the late 1950s and was listed on the National Register of Historic Places as the Silver Falls State Park Concession Building Area in 1983. The Silver Creek Youth Camp—Silver Falls State Park was also added to the National Register at this time.

Due to the work of those who protected the park, the forest has recovered from logging, grazing and agriculture. There was one stand of old growth firs at the time the park was inaugurated and it remains to this day. The rest of the forest has grown back and is now considered a secondary forest.

In January 2008, during the 2008 supplemental legislative session, Fred Girod of the Oregon House of Representatives sought federal designation of the area as a national park via a house joint memorial to the United States Congress, but the bill died in committee.

=== Geology ===
The history of the canyon's formation begins about 26 million years ago to the Oligocene period, when most of Oregon was covered by ocean. After the waters of the ocean receded about 15 million years ago, the flood basalt flows of the Columbia River Basalt Group covered the sandstone that had been the ocean floor. The softer layers of sandstone beneath the basalt sheet eroded over time, creating pathways behind some of the waterfalls that Civilian Conservation Corps workers widened to make safe for public use. Another geologic feature are many tree "chimneys" or casts, formed when hot lava engulfed living trees and disintegrated them.

== Waterfalls ==
Within the park are many waterfalls, including ten along the Trail of Ten Falls (marked with an asterisk in the table below) and five more below the confluence of the North and South forks of Silver Creek. The South Fork has an average flow rate of 75 cu ft/s (2.1 m^{3}/s), and the North Fork has an average flow rate of 100 cu ft/s (2.8 m^{3}/s). The Trail of Ten Falls passes behind the falls of South Falls, Lower South Falls, Middle North Falls, and North Falls.

Waterfall	Image	Distance on trail	Coordinates	Stream	Height
South Falls*		0.0	44.8788°N 122.6589°W	South Fork	177 feet (54 m)
Lower South Falls*		0.8	44.8853°N 122.6609°W	South Fork	93 feet (28 m)
(Confluence of N. & S. Forks)		1.1		Silver Creek	(N/A)
Lower North Falls*		2.1	44.8914°N 122.6464°W	North Fork	30 feet (9.1 m)
Double Falls*		2.1 + 0.1 on side trail	44.8920°N 122.6450°W	Hullt Creek	178 feet (54 m)
Drake Falls*		2.3	44.89°N 122.6461°W	North Fork	27 feet (8.2 m)
Middle North Falls*		2.5	44.8886°N 122.6431°W	North Fork	106 feet (32 m)
Winter Falls*		2.7 + 0.5 on side trail	44.8844°N 122.6408°W	Winter Creek	134 feet (41 m)
Twin Falls*		3.0	44.8852°N 122.6370°W	North Fork	31 feet (9.4 m)
North Falls*		3.9	44.8849°N 122.6227°W	North Fork	136 feet (41 m)
Upper North Falls*		4.6	44.8831°N 122.6142°W	North Fork	65 feet (20 m)
Crag Falls		1.1 + ? below confluence		Silver Creek	12 feet (3.7 m)
Elbow Falls		1.1 + ? below confluence		Silver Creek	20 feet (6.1 m)
Canyon Falls		1.1 + ? below confluence		Silver Creek	10 feet (3.0 m)
Lisp Falls		1.1 + ? below confluence		Silver Creek	5 feet (1.5 m)
Sunlight Falls		1.1 + ? below confluence		Silver Creek	5 feet (1.5 m)
Frenchie Falls		(just before start of trail)		Frenchie Creek	48 feet (15 m)
Trickle Falls		(3.5 above start of trail)		Tributary of S. Fork	?

== Climate ==
The climate of Silver Falls State Park is cooler and wetter than those of nearby towns and cities. According to the Köppen climate classification, Silver Falls State Park has a warm-summer Mediterranean climate (Csb).

Climate data for Silver Falls State Park, Oregon (1991–2020 normals, extremes 1938–present)
Month	Jan	Feb	Mar	Apr	May	Jun	Jul	Aug	Sep	Oct	Nov	Dec	Year
Record high °F (°C)	65 (18)	75 (24)	80 (27)	85 (29)	96 (36)	108 (42)	101 (38)	103 (39)	98 (37)	89 (32)	72 (22)	75 (24)	108 (42)
Mean maximum °F (°C)	51.5 (10.8)	55.6 (13.1)	62.7 (17.1)	71.1 (21.7)	79.9 (26.6)	83.3 (28.5)	89.1 (31.7)	89.1 (31.7)	83.7 (28.7)	70.1 (21.2)	56.8 (13.8)	51.5 (10.8)	92.6 (33.7)
Mean daily maximum °F (°C)	42.7 (5.9)	45.4 (7.4)	49.8 (9.9)	54.7 (12.6)	62.8 (17.1)	67.6 (19.8)	76.3 (24.6)	76.1 (24.5)	70.1 (21.2)	57.8 (14.3)	47.1 (8.4)	41.6 (5.3)	57.7 (14.3)
Daily mean °F (°C)	37.7 (3.2)	39.2 (4.0)	41.9 (5.5)	45.8 (7.7)	52.4 (11.3)	56.7 (13.7)	63.2 (17.3)	63.0 (17.2)	57.9 (14.4)	49.1 (9.5)	41.5 (5.3)	37.1 (2.8)	48.8 (9.3)
Mean daily minimum °F (°C)	32.7 (0.4)	32.9 (0.5)	34.0 (1.1)	36.9 (2.7)	42.0 (5.6)	45.8 (7.7)	50.2 (10.1)	49.9 (9.9)	45.8 (7.7)	40.5 (4.7)	35.9 (2.2)	32.5 (0.3)	39.9 (4.4)
Mean minimum °F (°C)	23.1 (−4.9)	23.3 (−4.8)	26.3 (−3.2)	28.2 (−2.1)	31.6 (−0.2)	38.1 (3.4)	42.4 (5.8)	42.1 (5.6)	36.8 (2.7)	29.7 (−1.3)	25.5 (−3.6)	22.2 (−5.4)	17.5 (−8.1)
Record low °F (°C)	−4 (−20)	3 (−16)	10 (−12)	19 (−7)	22 (−6)	30 (−1)	32 (0)	29 (−2)	23 (−5)	18 (−8)	2 (−17)	−4 (−20)	−4 (−20)
Average precipitation inches (mm)	8.83 (224)	8.37 (213)	8.09 (205)	6.43 (163)	4.40 (112)	2.96 (75)	0.66 (17)	0.80 (20)	2.27 (58)	5.51 (140)	9.39 (239)	11.21 (285)	68.92 (1,751)
Average snowfall inches (cm)	2.5 (6.4)	3.0 (7.6)	1.7 (4.3)	0.0 (0.0)	0.0 (0.0)	0.0 (0.0)	0.0 (0.0)	0.0 (0.0)	0.0 (0.0)	0.0 (0.0)	0.6 (1.5)	3.1 (7.9)	10.9 (27.7)
Average precipitation days (≥ 0.01 in)	10.3	12.9	12.9	14.4	10.1	6.2	1.4	2.3	4.2	10.1	13.9	14.3	113.0
Average snowy days (≥ 0.1 in)	0.7	1.3	0.5	0.0	0.0	0.0	0.0	0.0	0.0	0.0	0.1	1.1	3.7
Source 1: NOAA
Source 2: National Weather Service

== Wildfires ==
Between July 13 and 28 of 2020, a wildfire broke out in the eastern timbered area of Silver Falls State Park. The blaze grew to 27 acres and was mostly contained by July 15. The State Park remained open for visitors to view the falls but the campgrounds were closed for a short period. It was thought that the fire was the result of a lightning strike which smoldered for about a month before igniting. In September 2020, the Beachie Creek Fire came into the eastern and southern edges of the park. The fire was slowed by a reversal of the winds to the south and east and Oregon fire crews were able to contain the blaze, one of the largest and most destructive in state history. Other historic fires include the following:

- 1865: The Silverton Fire, the largest known in Oregon's history, burned a million acres including the Silver Falls area.
- 1886: A forest fire destroyed a large part of the forest on lands that would become Silver Falls State Park.
- 1925: September: A destructive forest fire raged near and at House Mountain.
- 1928: Summer: South Burn, a forest fire, damaged the Silver Falls area.

== Friends of Silver Falls ==
Volunteers have been active at Silver Falls State Park since its establishment. In 1986, citizens and park staff founded the Friends of Silver Falls State Park, Inc. with a mission "to further the educational and interpretive opportunities available to park visitors; to promote the preservation, protection and enhancement of the historical, natural, and recreational resources within the park; and to assist in the implementing park improvements and educational programs compatible with the nature of Silver Falls State Park." The organization has been responsible for much of the interpretive signage along the Trail of Ten Falls as well as spearheading the restoration and preservation of historical buildings and installing infrastructure like viewpoints and drinking fountains. Since 1992, volunteers of the Friends of Silver Falls State Park have operated the Nature Store in historic South Falls Lodge offering a variety of books, clothing and souvenirs in keeping with the park's nature theme which provides additional funding to be used for park improvements.

== In popular culture ==
The park has been used as a filming location in several movies. The 1981 horror film Just Before Dawn was shot entirely on location in the park; it also served as a filming location for William Friedkin's thriller The Hunted (2003), and the blockbuster film Twilight (2008).
