= Miller Cemetery Church =

Historic site in Marion County, Oregon

- U.S. National Register of Historic Places
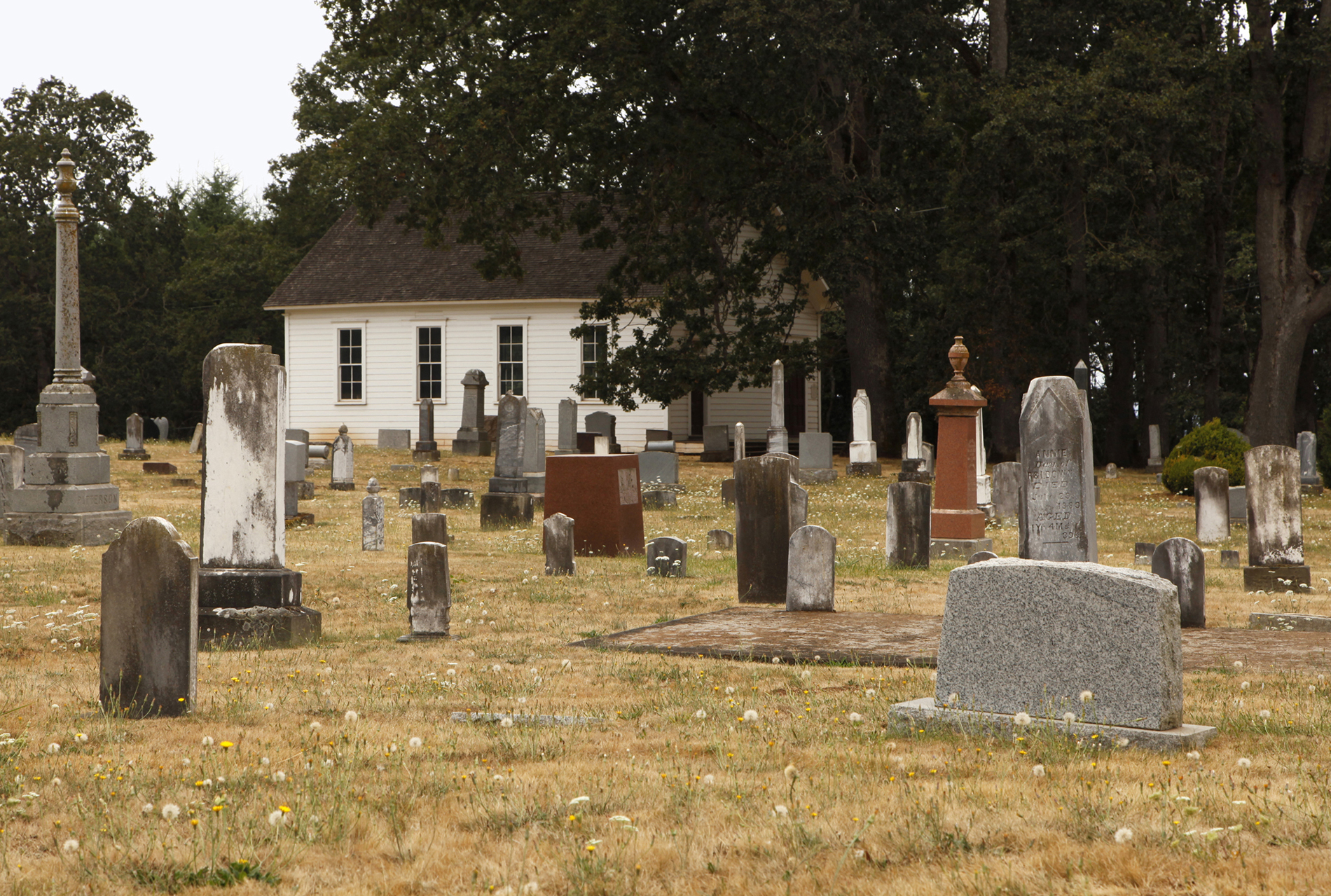

- Location within Oregon Location within the United States
- Nearest city: Silverton, Oregon
- Coordinates: 45°2′21″N 122°43′42″W
- Built: 1882
- NRHP reference No.: 78002304
- Added to NRHP: August 10, 1978

The Miller Cemetery Church near Silverton, Oregon was built in 1882. It is a rare example in Oregon of a "burying church".

It was listed on the National Register of Historic Places in 1978.
