= Calvary Lutheran Church and Parsonage (Silverton, Oregon) =

- U.S. National Register of Historic Places
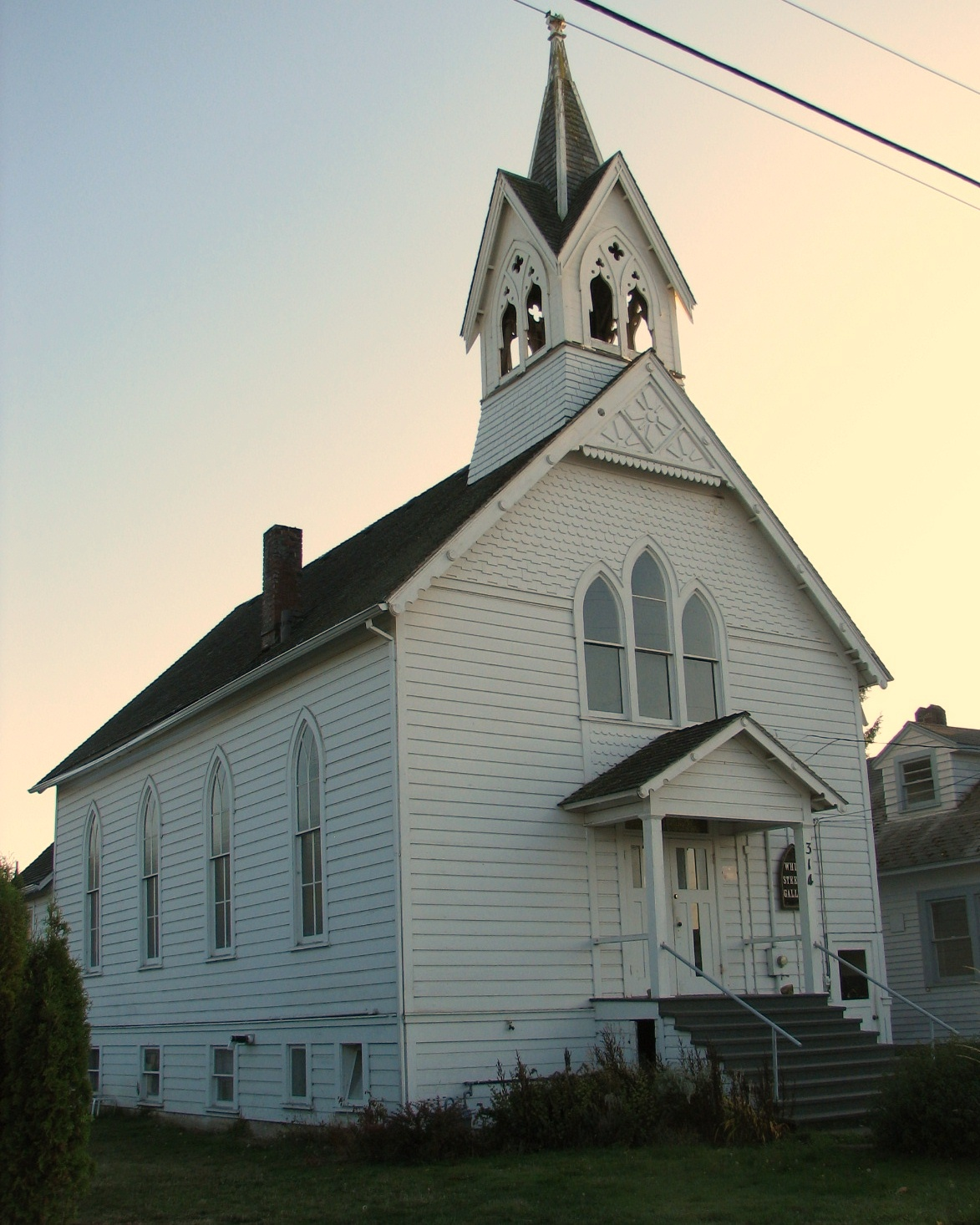
- Calvary Lutheran Church
- Location: 310–314 Jersey Street; Silverton, Oregon
- Coordinates: 45.004562°N 122.780414°W
- Built: 1891
- Architectural style: Gothic Revival, Queen Anne Bungalow/Craftsman, Greek Revival
- NRHP reference No.: 85001182
- Added to NRHP: June 6, 1985

Calvary Lutheran Church and Parsonage is a historic church building and parsonage in Silverton, Oregon, United States. The church is also known as the First Christian Church. The church is a combination of the Carpenter Gothic and the Queen Anne architectural styles. The parsonage is Bungalow/Craftsman and Greek Revival style.

Originally, the church was known as the First Christian Church. In 1906, the church building became the Norwegian Lutheran Church and in 1926-1927 it was remodeled to its current configuration. The church was sold in 1975, and in 1984, it became the White Steeple Gallery and Tea Room, a name by which it was still known in 1992.

The church, a balloon frame 26 by 52 feet (7.9 m × 15.8 m) building built during 1891–92, is Gothic Revival in style, with Eastlake ornamentation. It was moved to a new location on a raised foundation on the same tax lot in the 1920s. The parsonage, built in 1926, is a one-and-a-half-story bungalow. The property includes a non-contributing parson's study, a one-story detached building built between 1953 and 1956, behind the church.

The church and parsonage buildings were listed on the National Register of Historic Places in 1985.

== See also ==
- National Register of Historic Places listings in Marion County, Oregon
