= Louis J. Adams House =

- U.S. National Register of Historic Places
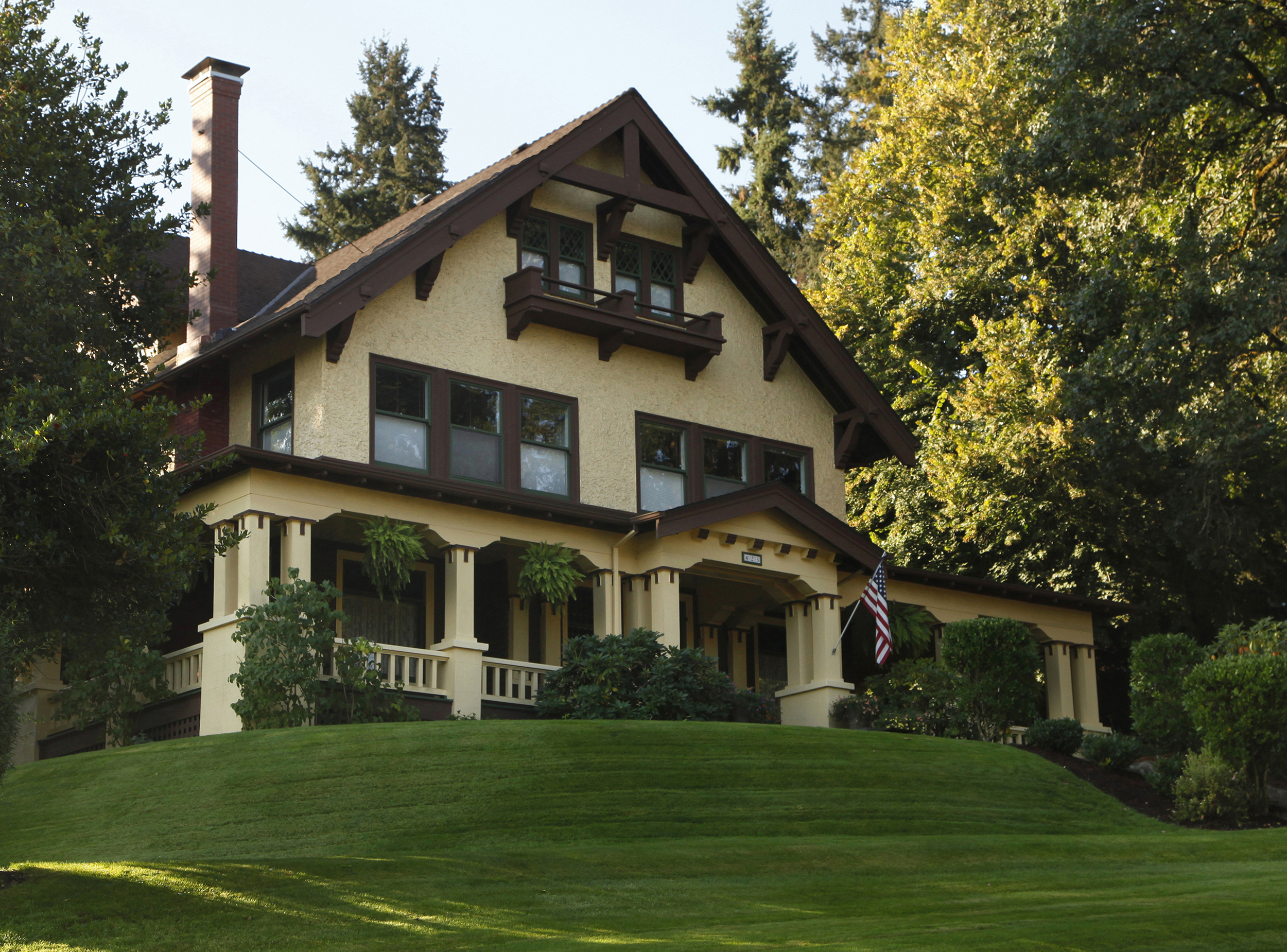

- Location within Oregon Location within the United States
- Location: 423 W. Main St., Silverton, Oregon
- Coordinates: 45.003056°N 122.786944°W
- Built: 1912
- MPS: Silverton, Oregon, and Its Environs MPS
- NRHP reference No.: 11000076
- Added to NRHP: March 12, 2011

The Louis J. Adams House is a historic house located in Silverton in Marion County, Oregon. It was listed on the National Register of Historic Places in 2011.

It is a prominent building in Silverton. It is a Craftsman architecture house that is deemed an "outstanding example" of the style. It is one of three houses in Silverton listed in the same day.

== See also ==
- Murton E. and Lillian DeGuire House
- June D. Drake House
