= Calvary Lutheran Church (Minneapolis) =

Historic church in Minnesota, United States

- U.S. National Register of Historic Places
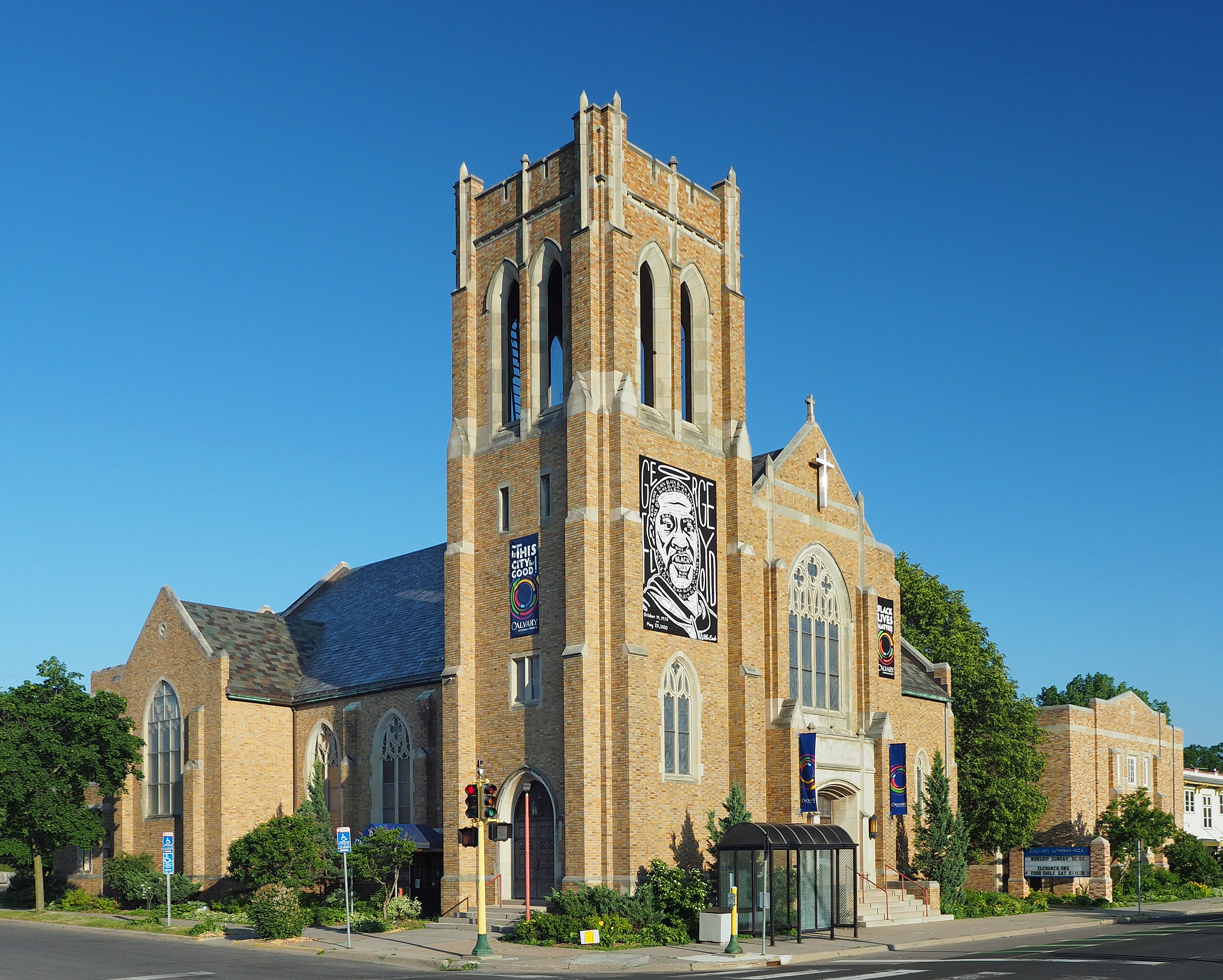
- Calvary Lutheran Church from the intersection of 39th Street and Chicago Avenue.
- Location: 3901 Chicago Ave., Minneapolis, MN
- Coordinates: 44°55′56″N 93°15′44″W
- Built: 1930
- Architect: Lang and Raugland
- Architectural style: Late Gothic Revival
- NRHP reference No.: 100007577
- Added to NRHP: April 7, 2022

Calvary Lutheran Church is an historic church on the National Register of Historic Places in Minneapolis, Minnesota. The church was built in 1930 with an addition built in 1953. The church is an exemplary work of the prolific Minneapolis architectural firm of Lang and Raugland. The church is located one block south of George Floyd Square.

== History ==
The congregation was founded in 1923. The church initially separated from Swedish Evangelical Lutheran Church in Saint Paul due to a desire to have more English language services. The architects, Lang and Raugland, specialized in the Gothic Revival style and designed both the 1930 church and the 1953 school building. A parking lot was constructed behind the church in the 1950s in place of several homes. A food shelf run by the church has operated since the 1980s.

By the 2020s, the church had over a million dollars in deferred maintenance and limited funds to do repairs. The church decided to sell the building to a non-profit housing developer in 2021 in a unanimous vote. The total cost to renovate the existing buildings and construct a new apartment building on the former parking lot was $23.5 million. The church space is used as a community area for residents during the week while the church rents the space to use for worship on Sundays. 20 units are located in the new building and 21 units are located in the historic school building. Every unit is considered deeply affordable which means the units are affordable for those making 30% of the area median income, about $33,000 for a family of three. The units are a mix of 1, 2, 3 and 4 bedrooms. Every unit was leased within two weeks of the completion of construction.
