= Murton E. and Lillian DeGuire House =

- U.S. National Register of Historic Places
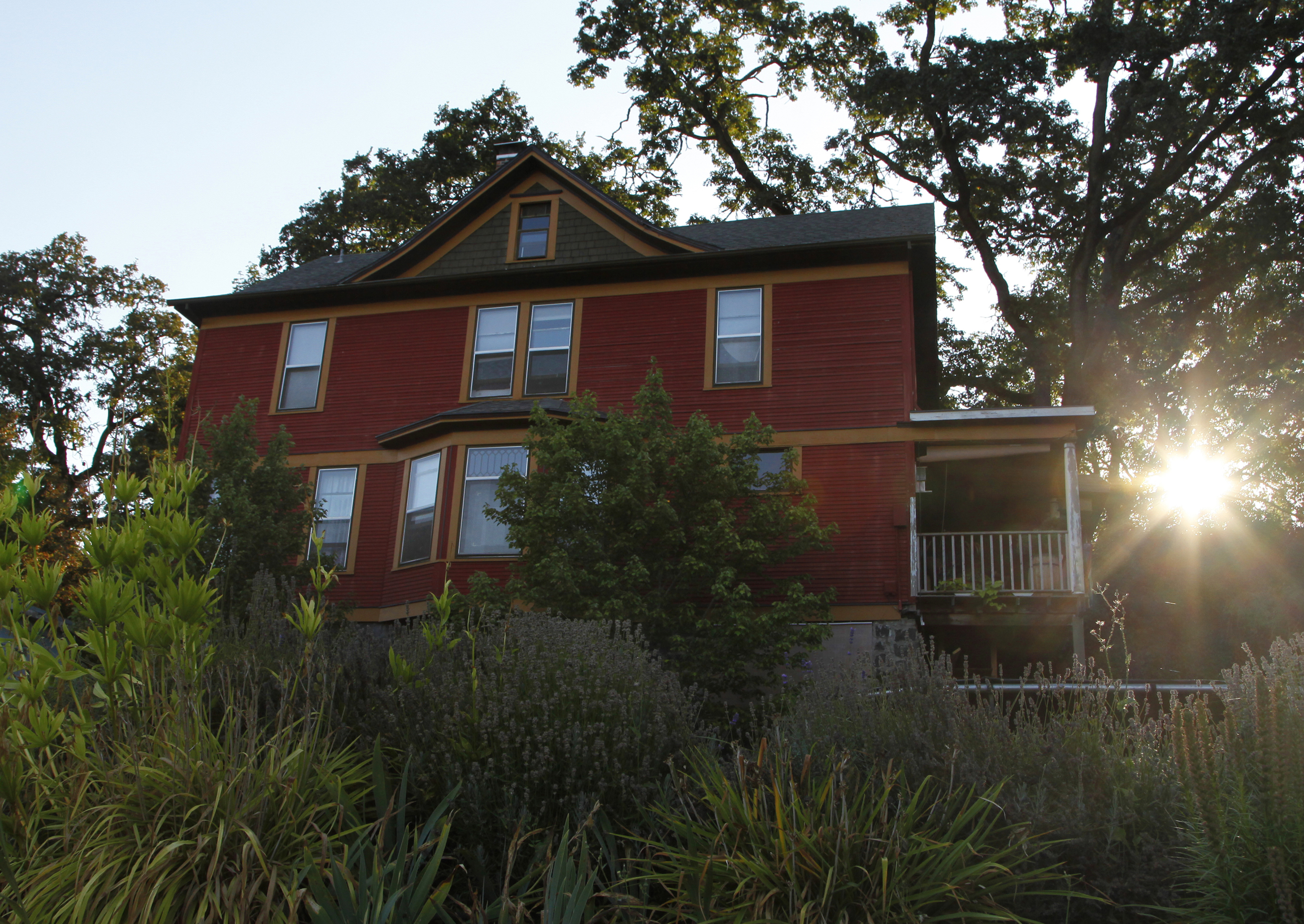
- The Murton E. and Lillian DeGuire House on B Street in Silverton, Oregon

- Location within Oregon Location within the United States
- Location: 631 B St., Silverton, Oregon
- Coordinates: 45°00′35″N 122°46′46″W
- Architectural style: Late 19th and 20th Century Revivals, Mediterranean
- MPS: Silverton, Oregon, and Its Environs MPS
- NRHP reference No.: 11000077

The Murton E. and Lillian DeGuire House is a historic house built in 1906 and located in Silverton in Marion County, Oregon. It was built in the "Free - Classic Queen Anne" style with modest ornamentation that includes leaded glass, projecting bays, groups of windows that include both long and short windows, and differing siding textures. The basic block form with dormers and gables is perhaps most commonly associated with the Colonial Revival Style.

It was listed on the National Register of Historic Places in 2011. It is one of three houses in Silverton listed on the National Register in the same day. The reasons for inscription are that the house is a representative of the "Free - Classic Queen Anne" and retains integrity.

== History ==
The DeGuire family were early settlers in Silverton. Murton DeGuire, their son, grew up in Silverton.

== See also ==
- Louis J. Adams House
- June D. Drake House
