= Lower South Falls =

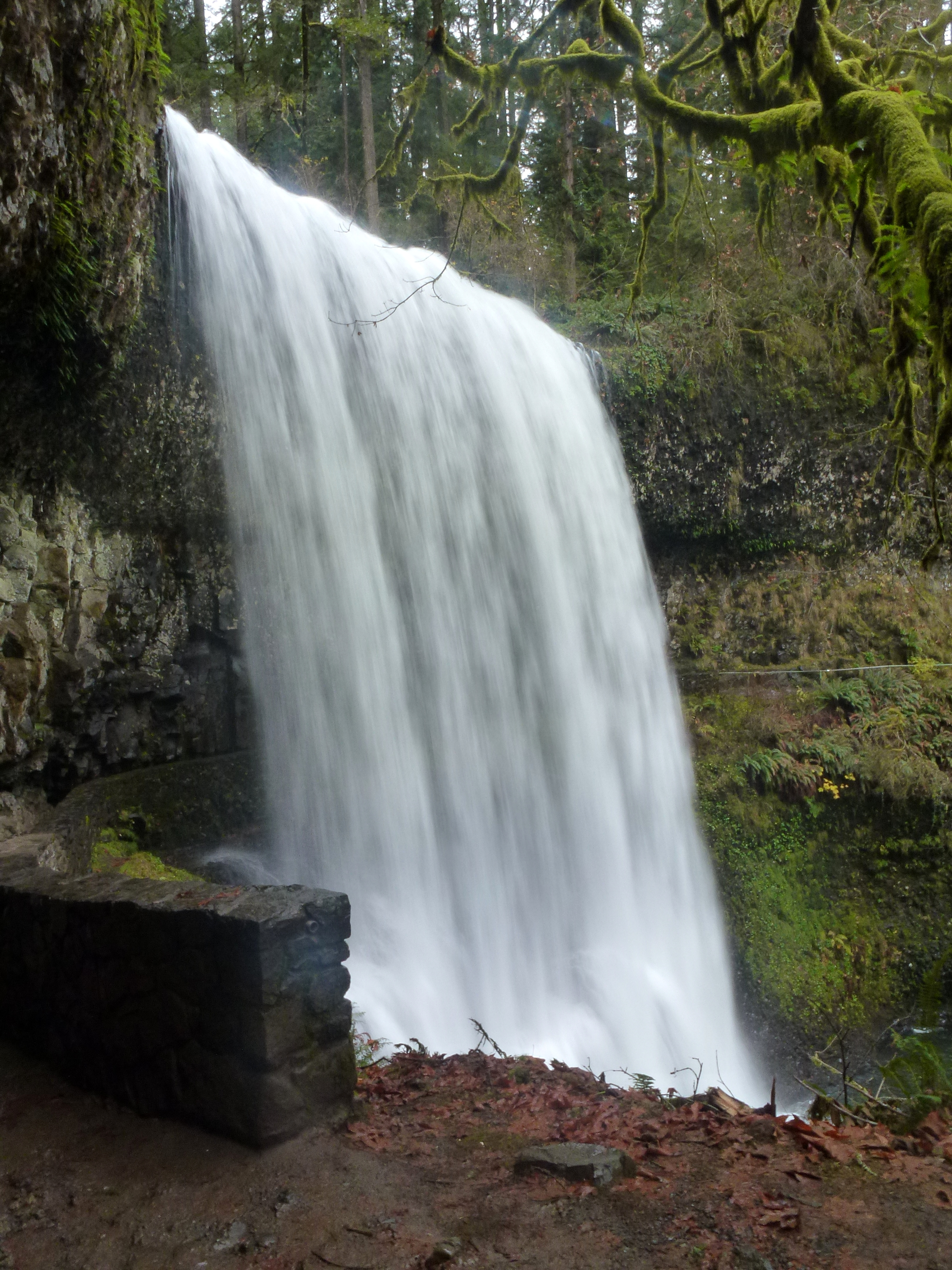
- Lower South Falls in the Fall
- Interactive map of Lower South Falls
- Location: Silver Falls State Park
- Coordinates: 44.88528°N 122.66092°W
- Type: Plunge
- Elevation: 1,218 ft (371 m)
- Total height: 93 ft (28 m)
- Average flow rate: 75 cu ft/s (2.1 m^{3}/s)

Lower South Falls, is a waterfall located in the Silver Falls State Park at the east end of the city of Salem, in Marion County, in the U.S. state of Oregon. It is located in a privileged area on the west foothills where Mount Hood National Forest meets with the Middle Santiam Wilderness. Several prominent waterfalls are located in the Park along Trail of Ten Falls: South Falls, Drake Falls, Middle North Falls, and Winter Falls—among others.

== Location ==
Lower South Falls is created along the course of South Silver Creek and it sits on the west section of Silver Falls State Park Trail of Ten Falls, along Canyon Trail, a mile north of South Falls. Lower South Falls is one of four waterfalls in the Park where the trail passes behind the falls.

== See also ==
- List of waterfalls in Oregon
