= Lower North Falls =

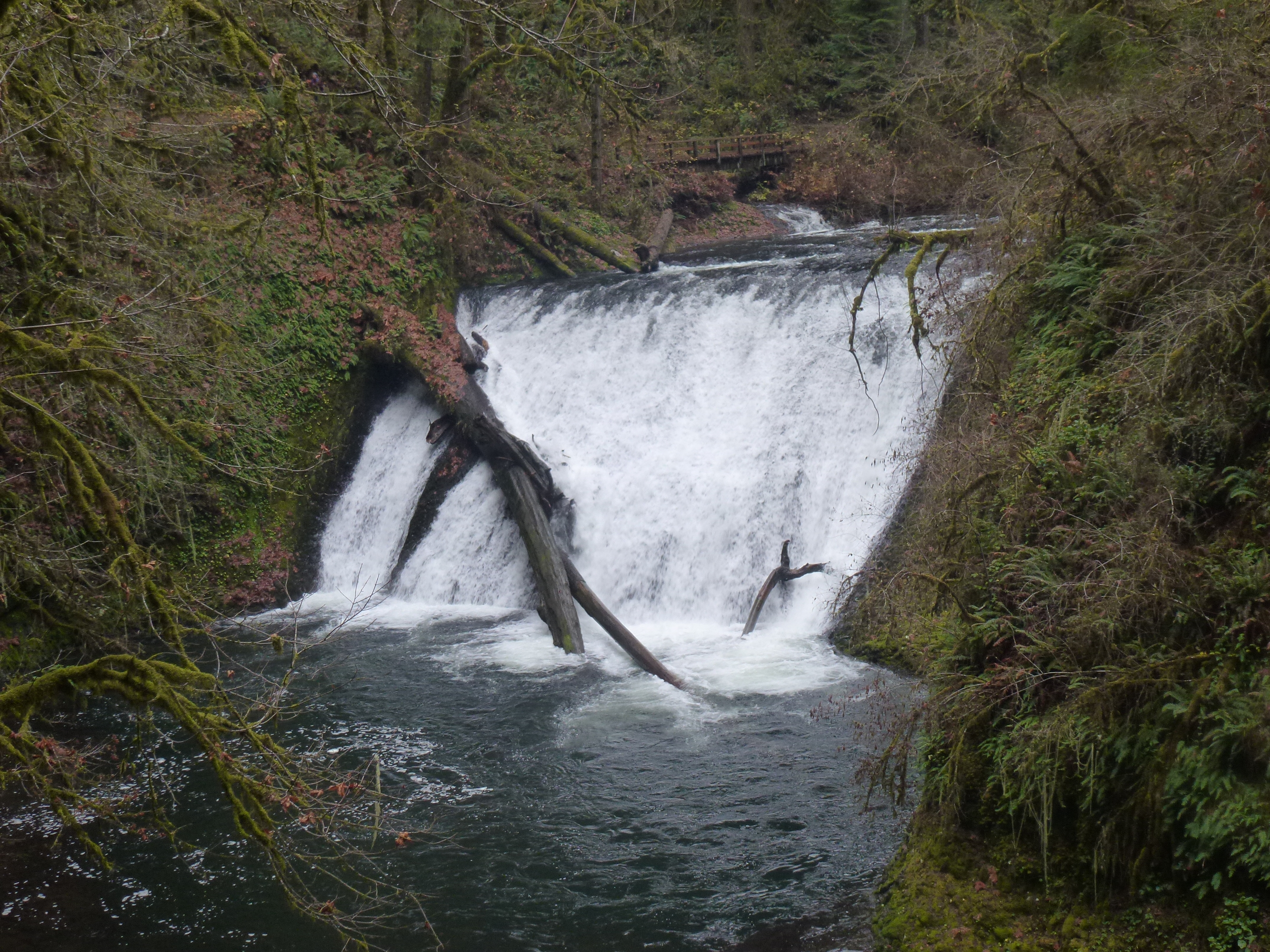
- Lower North Falls in the Fall
- Interactive map of Lower North Falls
- Location: Silver Falls State Park
- Coordinates: 44.89139°N 122.64639°W
- Type: Plunge
- Elevation: 1,058 ft (322 m)
- Total height: 30 ft (9.1 m)
- Average flow rate: 100 cu ft/s (2.8 m^{3}/s)

Lower North Falls, is a waterfall located in the Silver Falls State Park at the east end of the city of Salem, in Marion County, in the U.S. state of Oregon. It is located in a privileged area on the west foothills where Mount Hood National Forest meets with the Middle Santiam Wilderness. Several prominent waterfalls are located in the Park along Trail of Ten Falls including South Falls, Drake Falls, Middle North Falls and Winter Falls.

== Location ==
Lower North Falls is the last of six waterfalls created along the course of North Silver Creek and is the furthest from the Silver Falls State Park Trail of Ten Falls, along Canyon Trail, a quarter of a mile north of Drake Falls. Double Falls forms a few yards upstream through Hullt Creek, a tributary of the North Fork Silver Creek.

== See also ==
- List of waterfalls in Oregon
