= Winter Falls =

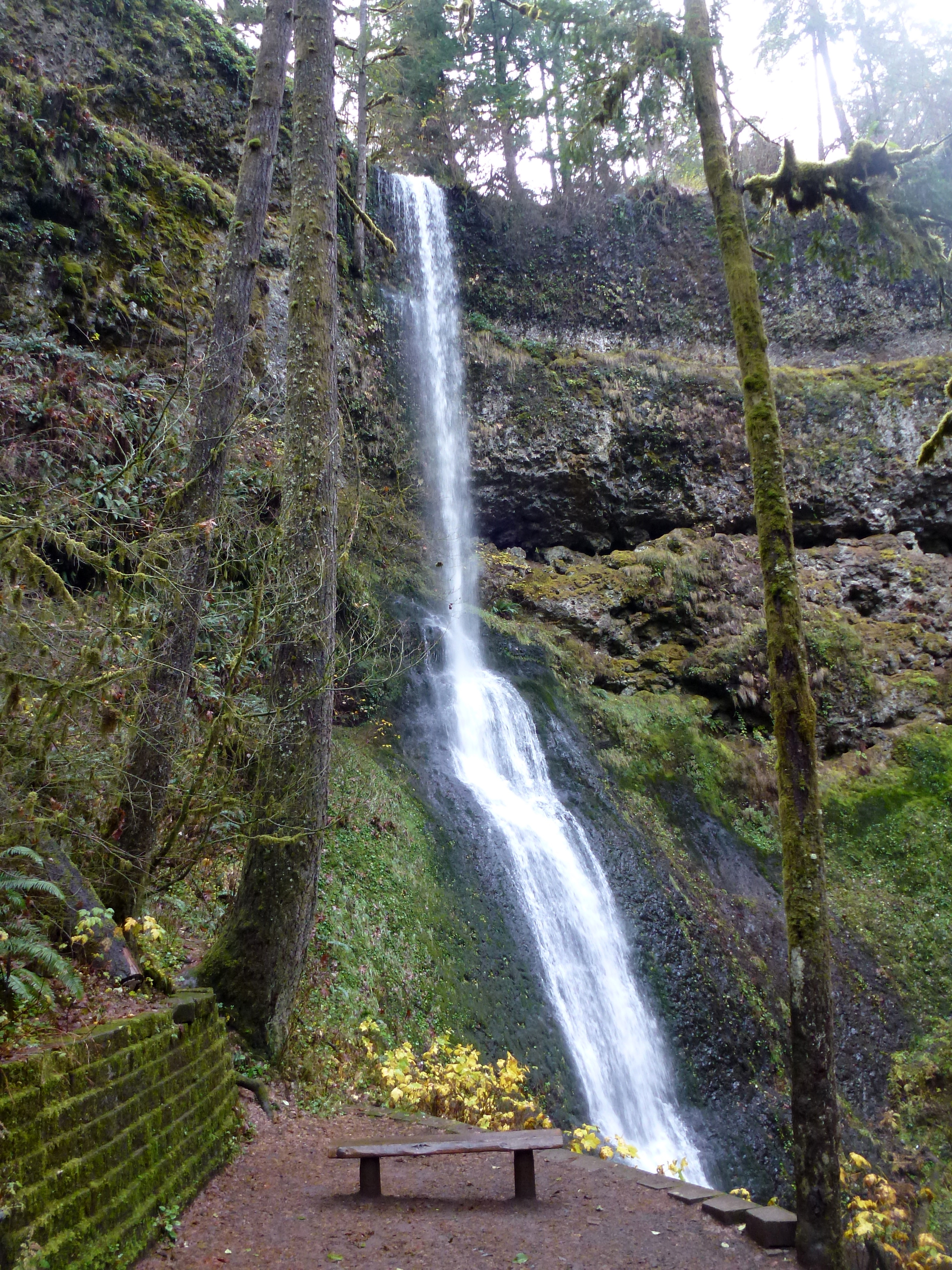
- Winter Falls in the Fall
- Interactive map of Winter Falls
- Location: Silver Falls State Park
- Coordinates: 44.8844°N 122.64083°W
- Type: Plunge
- Elevation: 1,370 ft (420 m)
- Total height: 134 ft (41 m)
- Average flow rate: 100 cu ft/s (2.8 m^{3}/s)

Winter Falls, is a waterfall located in the Silver Falls State Park at the east end of the city of Salem, in Marion County, in the U.S. state of Oregon. It is located in a privileged area on the west foothills where Mount Hood National Forest meets with the Middle Santiam Wilderness. Several prominent waterfalls are located in the Park along Trail of Ten Falls: South Falls, Lower South Falls, Lower North Falls, and Drake Falls—among others.

== Location ==
Winter Falls is created along the course of South Silver Creek and it sits on the north section of Silver Falls State Park Trail of Ten Falls, along Winter Falls Loop, half a mile south of Middle North Falls. Winter Falls is the fourth tallest waterfall in the Silver Falls State Park.

== Description ==
The falls drops in a straight plunge down approximately 100 feet (30 m) to a steeply slanted protrusion of basalt which causes veiling of the cascade the remaining distance to the pool. Winter Creek, from which the waterfall is produced, only flows during the winter months, hence the name of both the stream and its cascade. Despite being one of the tallest waterfalls in the park, it is the one with the lowest flow volume. During the summer months, Winter Falls tends to be but a dribble of water spattering over the cliff of basalt.

== See also ==
- List of waterfalls in Oregon
