= Drake Falls =

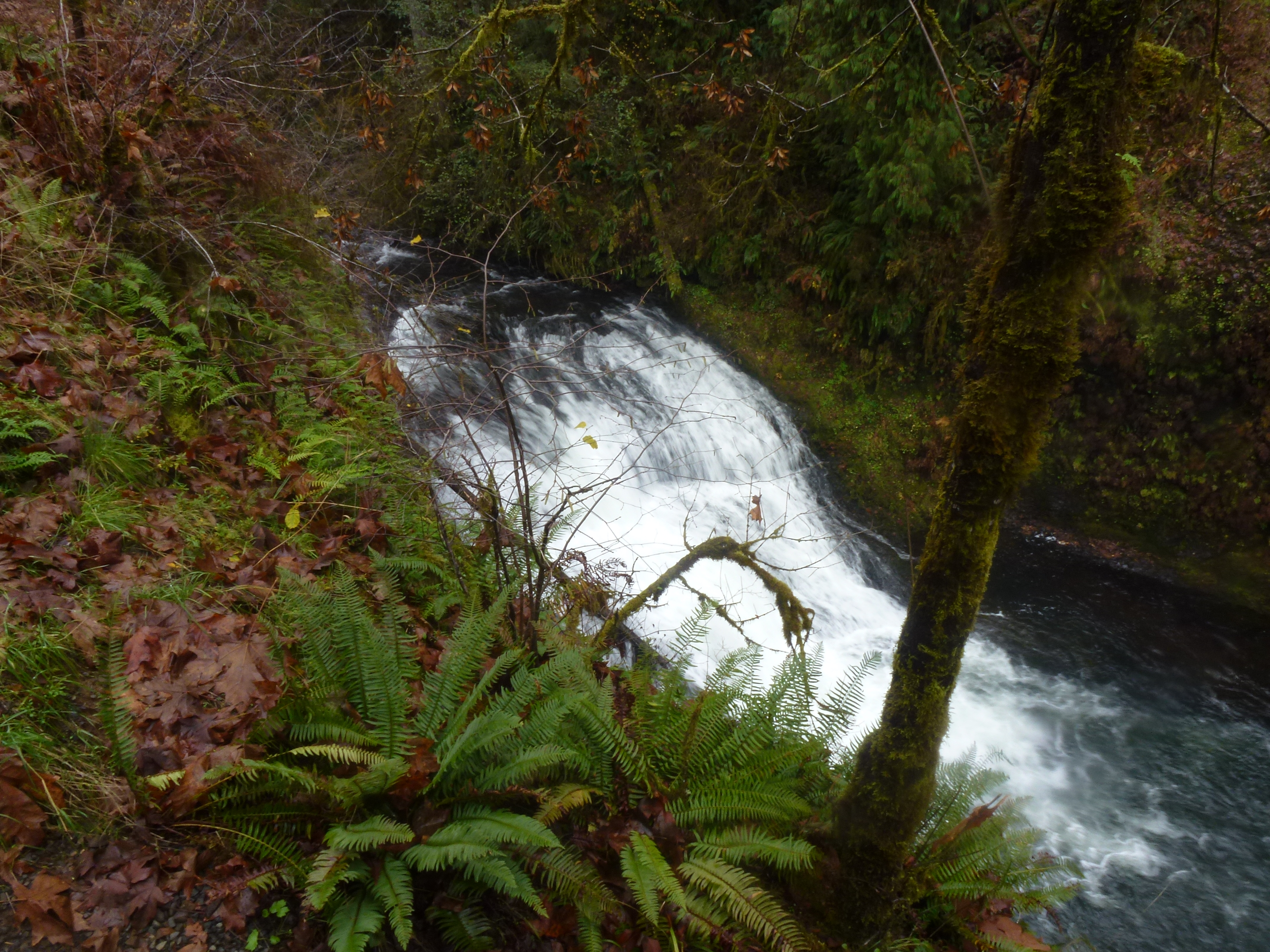
- Drake Falls in the Fall
- Interactive map of Drake Falls
- Location: Silver Falls State Park
- Coordinates: 44.89°N 122.64611°W
- Type: Plunge
- Elevation: 1,063 ft (324 m)
- Total height: 27 ft (8.2 m)
- Average flow rate: 100 cu ft/s (2.8 m^{3}/s)

Drake Falls, is a waterfall located in the Silver Falls State Park at the east end of the city of Salem, in Marion County, in the U.S. state of Oregon. It is located in a privileged area on the west foothills where Mount Hood National Forest meets with the Middle Santiam Wilderness. Several prominent waterfalls are located in the Park along Trail of Ten Falls: South Falls, Upper North Falls, Lower North Falls, and Winter Falls—among others.

== Location ==
Drake Falls is created along the course of South Silver Creek and it sits on the north section of Silver Falls State Park Trail of Ten Falls, along Canyon Trail, two miles north of Lower South Falls. Drake Falls is the smallest along the Trail of Ten Falls.

== See also ==
- List of waterfalls in Oregon
