= Middle Santiam Wilderness =

Wilderness area in Oregon, United States

- IUCN category Ib (wilderness area)
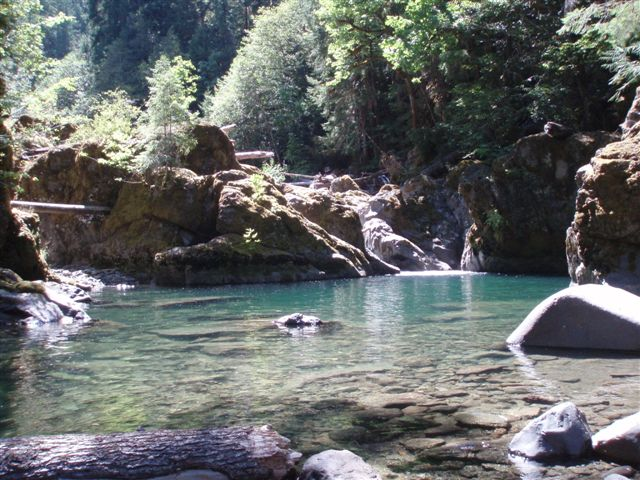
- A pool in the wilderness

- Location within the United States
- Location: Linn County, Oregon, U.S.
- Nearest city: Sweet Home, Oregon
- Coordinates: 44°34′28.36″N 122°16′38.07″W
- Area: 8,542 acres (3,457 ha)
- Established: 1984
- Governing body: United States Forest Service

The Middle Santiam Wilderness is a wilderness area located near Mount Washington in the central Cascade Range of Oregon, U.S., within the Willamette National Forest.

== Topography ==
The Middle Santiam Wilderness ranges from steep slopes, high peaks, and ridges at the higher elevations to gently sloping and bench-like terrain in the lower elevations. The most prominent features include Donaca Lake, the Middle Santiam River, and the 4,965-foot Chimney Peak, a lava plug in the northwestern portion of the Wilderness. Not far to the south of the Middle Santiam Wilderness lies Menagerie Wilderness.

== Flora and fauna ==
Much of the Middle Santiam Wilderness is forested with mature stands of old growth estimated to be 450 years old and 200 feet (61 m) tall. Douglas-fir, western redcedar and western hemlock grow at lower elevations and true firs near the ridgelines. Native fish populations, including Chinook salmon during spawning season, thrive in both the Santiam River and Donaca Lake.

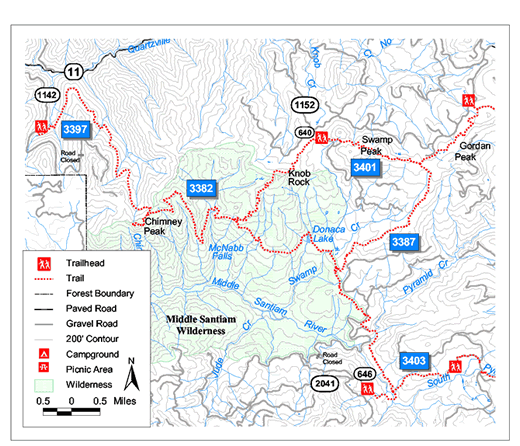
Map of the wilderness area and its surroundings

== See also ==
- List of Oregon Wildernesses
- List of U.S. Wilderness Areas
- Wilderness Act
- List of old growth forests
