= Pacific Building =

Pacific Building may refer to:

- Pacific Building (Albuquerque, New Mexico) or Pacific Desk Building, a 1914 cast iron storefront
- Pacific Building (Portland, Oregon), a 1926 Italianate office
- Pacific Building (Salem, Oregon), formerly Capitol Theater, a 1926 retail site
- Pacific Building (Seattle), a 1971 22-story building
