= Capitol Center (Salem, Oregon) =

- Old First National Bank Building
- U.S. National Register of Historic Places
- U.S. Historic district – Contributing property
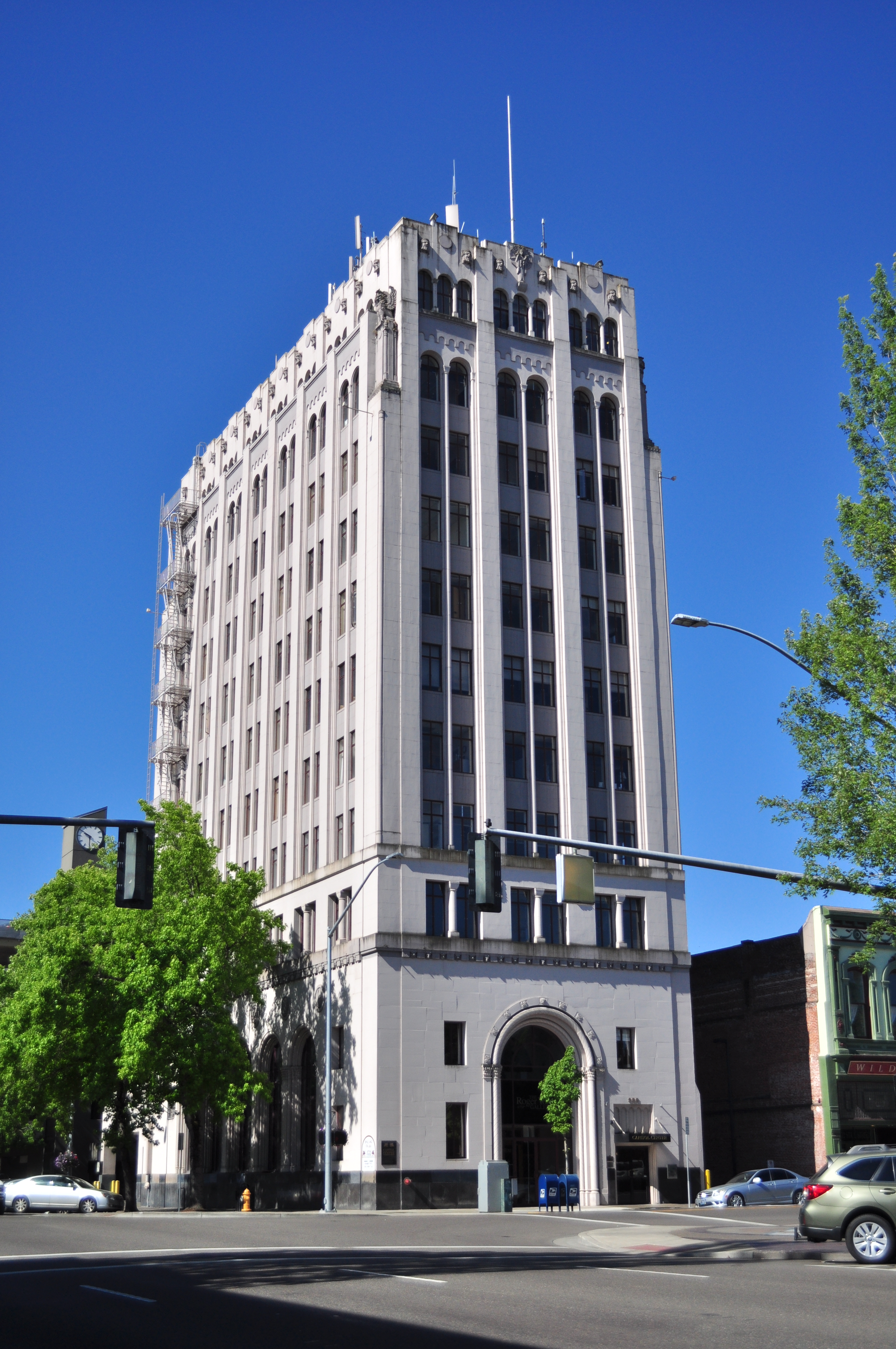
- Building in 2017

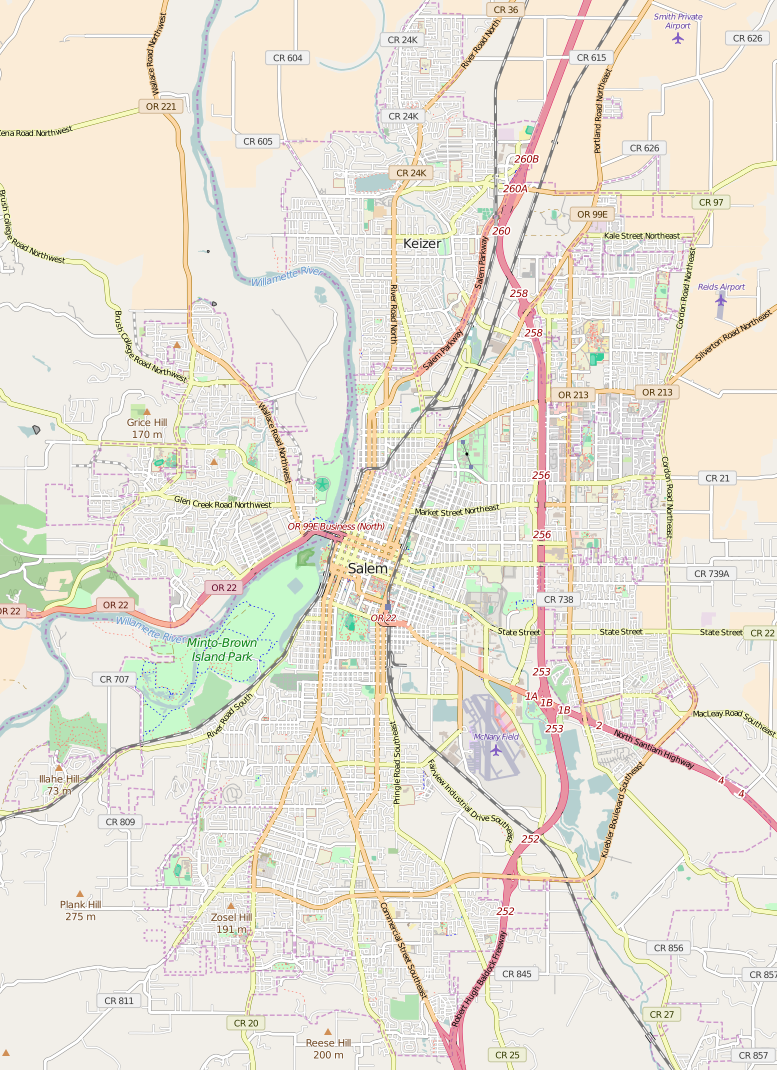
- Location within Salem OR Location within Oregon
- Location: 388 State Street; Salem, Oregon
- Coordinates: 44°56′20″N 123°02′14″W
- Area: less than one acre
- Built: 1927
- Architect: Dougan, Leigh L.; Hammond & Hammond Co.
- Part of: Salem Downtown State Street – Commercial Street Historic District (ID01001067)
- NRHP reference No.: 86002851
- Added to NRHP: October 9, 1986

The Capitol Center is a high-rise office building in downtown Salem, Oregon, United States. Finished in 1927, it was originally known as the First National Bank Building and owned by Salem businessman Thomas A. Livesley. The eleven story building was designed by architect Leigh L. Dougan and is the tallest office building in Salem. Located at State and Liberty streets it is part of Salem's downtown historic district and was added to the National Register of Historic Places in 1986 as the Old First National Bank Building.

== History ==
Thomas Livesley who had made his fortune in hops, hired Leigh L. Dougan to design a skyscraper to be built in Salem. At the time, Livesley was the vice president of the Oregon Linen Mills, with Livesley financing the project. Construction began in July 1926 by Hammond & Hammond Company. Named the First National Bank Building, it opened at the beginning of 1927. Livesley was the incorporator of the bank in 1923.

When it opened the building was controversial with some describing it as unattractive while others calling it a monument. Thomas Livesley died in 1947 and the building was then renamed in his honor as the Livesley Building, and later changed to the Cascade Bank Building. On October 9, 1986, the building was added to the National Register of Historic Places. The tower was renovated by then owners Morse Brothers, Inc. from 1987 to 1988 and then renamed to its current moniker of the Capitol Center. They would sell the building for $3.1 million to the investor group Salem Gargoyle in January 1997.

In April 2003, the building was purchased by Roger Yost for $4.65 million, after he had already purchased the nearby Reed Opera House. Also known as the Capitol Tower, parts of the high-rise were remodeled by Yost, including the installation of new elevators and refurbishing the seventh floor.

== Details ==
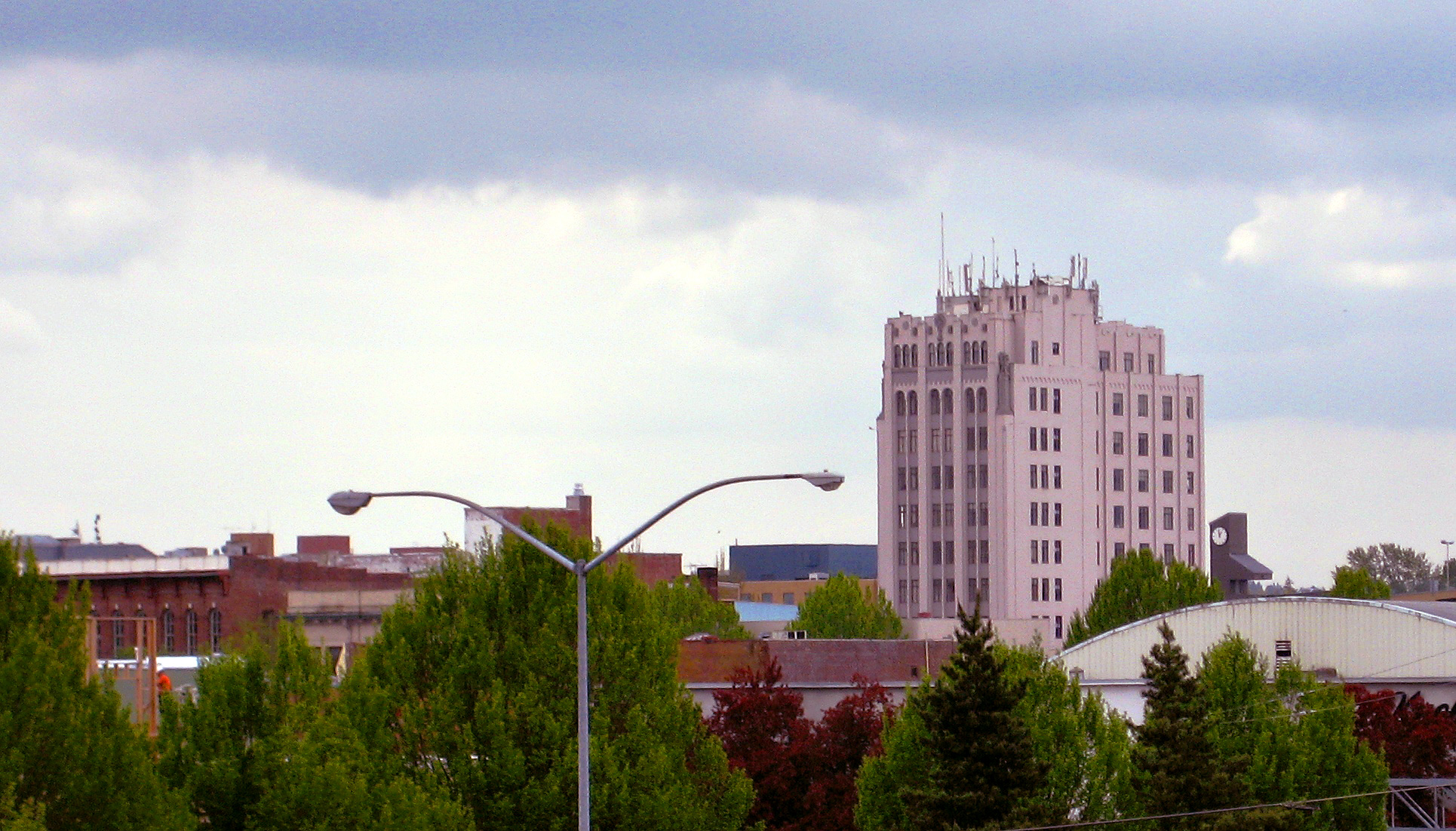
Building from a distance

Located on State Street in downtown Salem, the structure rises 151 feet (46 m) to the top of its parapet wall, and contains eleven floors. Classified as the only high-rise building in Salem, it is the third tallest building in the city after the Salem First United Methodist Church (188 feet tall) and the Oregon State Capitol (173 feet tall). Capitol Center is 164 feet (50 m) tall as measured to the top of its tallest antenna.

Constructed of a reinforced concrete frame, the exterior walls are lined with a Florentine sandstone that is light pink in color. The exterior includes decorative gargoyles and heads at the top. The fifth floor is considered historic and retains its original look, including doors made from mahogany. There is a total of 49,700 square feet (4,620 m^{2}) of usable floor space in the building.
