= Salem Downtown State Street – Commercial Street Historic District =

Historic district in Oregon, United States

- U.S. National Register of Historic Places
- U.S. Historic district
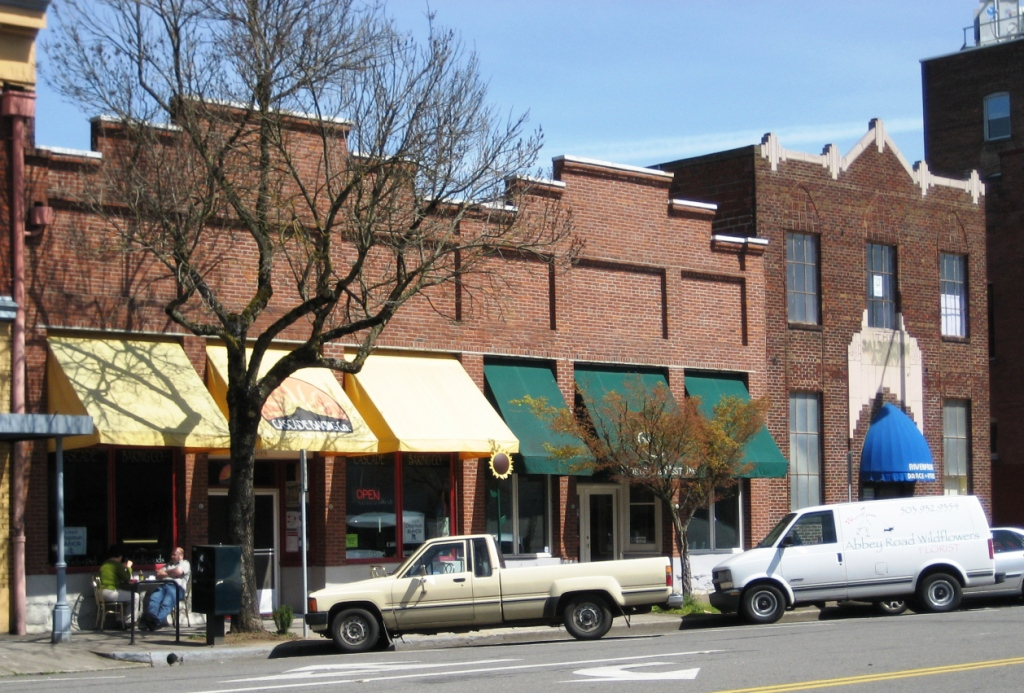
- The historic district's Smith & Wade Building (left, historic name, ca. 1870) and Salvation Army Building (right, historic name, ca. 1930) in 2008

- Location within Oregon Location within the United States

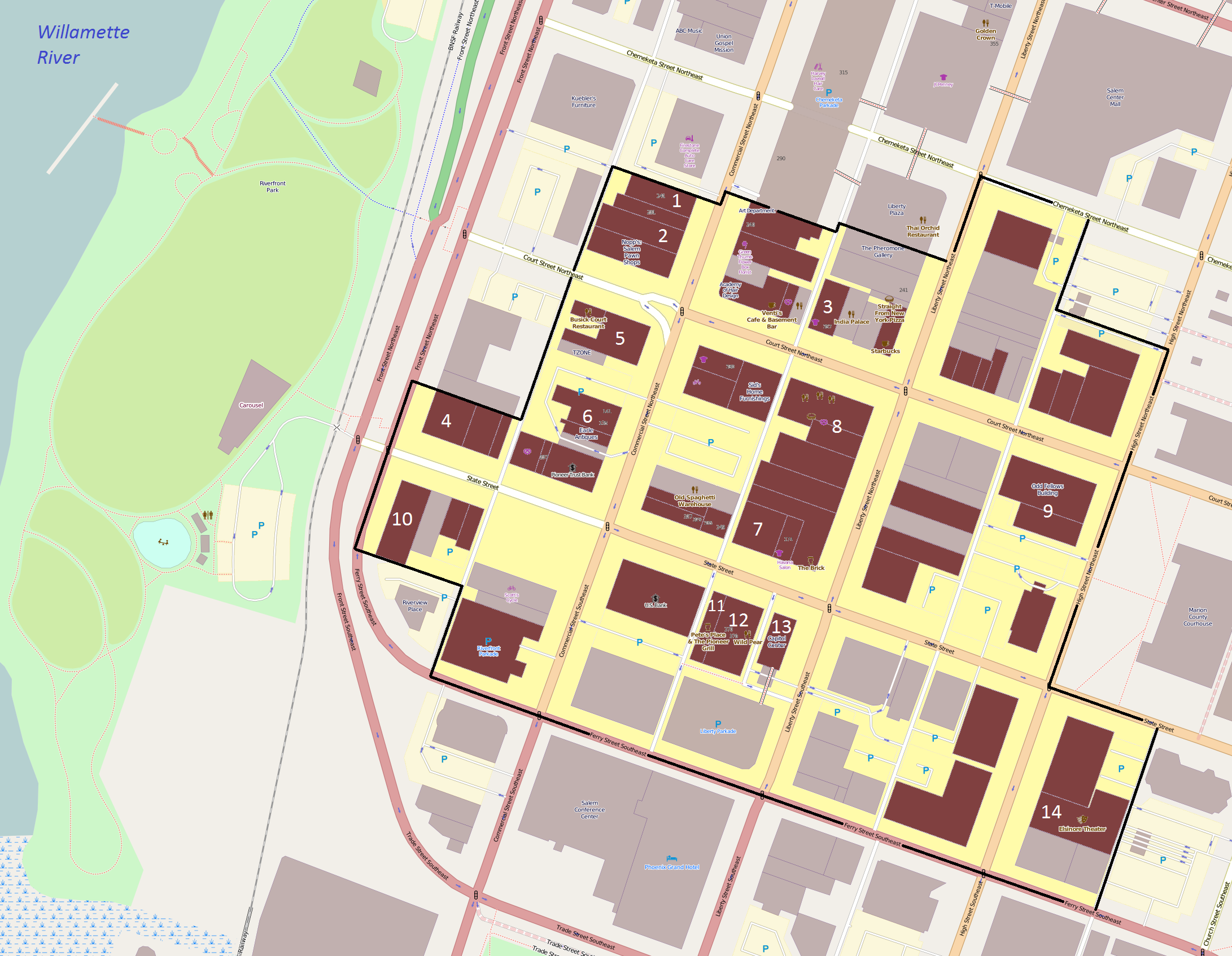
- The historic district boundaries and contributing buildings in downtown Salem
- Location: Salem, Oregon, roughly bounded by Ferry, High, Chemeketa, and Front Streets
- Coordinates: 44°56′24″N 123°02′22″W
- Area: Approx. 44 acres (18 ha)
- Built: ca. 1867 – ca. 1950
- Architect: Ellis F. Lawrence, Holly A. Cornell, Walter D. Pugh, Wilbur F. Boothby, G.W. Rhodes, Fred A. Legg, John Gray, Pietro Belluschi, Morris H. Whitehouse, J.S. Coulter, C.S. McNally, William C. Knighton, Leigh L. Dougan, Robert Rowe, others
- Architectural style: Italianate, Queen Anne, Richardsonian Romanesque, Commercial, Revival styles, Modernistic, others
- NRHP reference No.: 01001067
- Added to NRHP: September 28, 2001

The Salem Downtown State Street – Commercial Street Historic District comprises a portion of the central business district of Salem, Oregon, United States. Located on the Willamette River transportation corridor and near Jason Lee's Mission Mill, Salem's downtown area was first platted in 1846. Subsequent development patterns closely reflected the drivers of Salem's growth as an important agricultural and commercial center. Surviving buildings represent a wide range of architectural styles from the 1860s through the 1950s. The district was added to the National Register of Historic Places in 2001.

== See also ==
- National Register of Historic Places listings in Marion County, Oregon
- Adolph Block
- Bush–Breyman Block
- Capitol Center (Oregon)
- Elsinore Theatre
- Salem's Historic Grand Theatre
- Pacific Building (Salem, Oregon)
- Reed Opera House and McCornack Block Addition
