= Hallie Parrish Hinges =

American singer

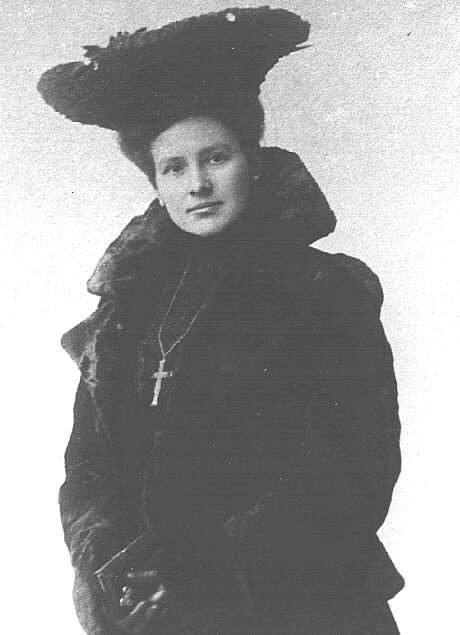

Background information
- Born: January 30, 1868
- Died: January 25, 1950 (aged 81) Salem, Oregon, US

Hallie Parrish Hinges (January 30, 1868 – January 25, 1950) was an American singer nicknamed "The Oregon Nightingale". She performed for many notable people, including presidents Benjamin Harrison, William McKinley, and Theodore Roosevelt.

== Biography ==
Hinges was born on January 30, 1868. Her grandfather was Oregon pioneer missionary Josiah L. Parrish. She studied under Z. M. Parvin at Willamette College, graduating at 18. In 1891, she sang for Benjamin Harrison. In 1900, she sang for William Jennings Bryan. On May 21, 1903, at Willson Park, she sang The Star-Spangled Banner for Theodore Roosevelt. Roosevelt reportedly told Governor George Earle Chamberlain, "She has one of the most beautiful voices I have ever heard. Have her sing again." Hinges sang "The Flag Without a Stain", and Roosevelt supposedly responded by saying: "Truly, she is the Oregon Nightingale."

Hinges sang regularly at weddings and funerals, as well as political events, including the opening and closing of the Oregon Legislature and the inauguration of the Governor of Oregon. She was a soloist at the Oregon State Fair, and she also sang at the Reed Opera House and the Grand Theater. At the first musical performance in Oregon to be broadcast over the radio, from the Portland Oregonian Tower, Hallie was a prominent performer. She performed at private events as well, such as the opening of the Multnomah Athletic Club.

Hinges married three times. Her 1894 marriage to Charles H. Hinges produced two children: Karl Hinges and Hallie Hinges Nelson. Her marriage to C. B. Durdall was dissolved in 1920, and she reverted to her previous married name Hinges. She died on January 25, 1950, and is buried in Lee Mission Cemetery.
