= Salem's Historic Grand Theatre =

- Chemeketa Lodge No. 1, Odd Fellows Buildings
- U.S. National Register of Historic Places
- U.S. Historic district – Contributing property
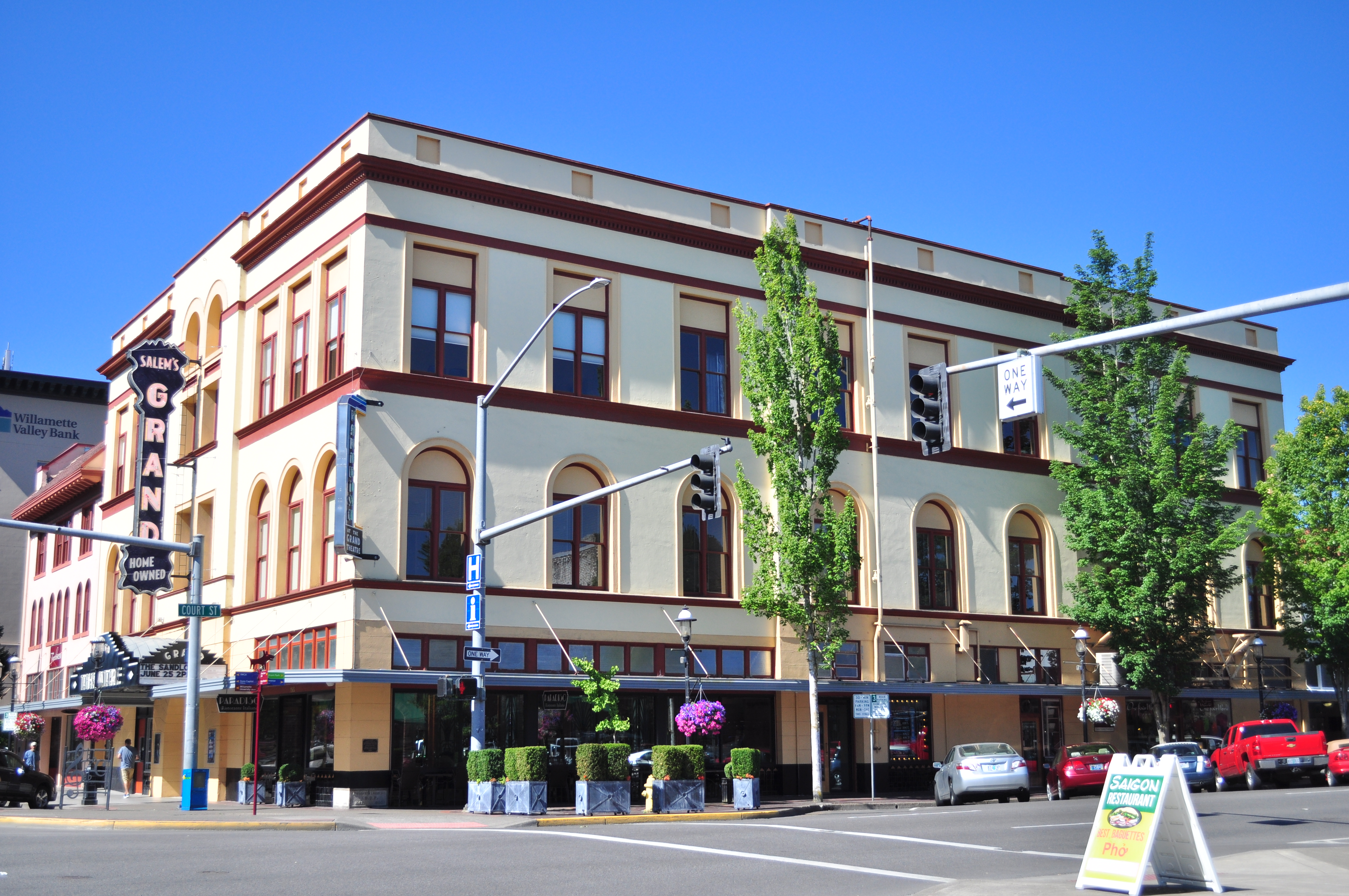
- Corner view, 2017
- Location: 185–195 High Street, NE; Salem, Oregon
- Coordinates: 44°56′26.08″N 123°2′14.03″W
- Built: 1900
- Architect: Walter D. Pugh, Morris Homans Whitehouse
- Architectural style: Romanesque Revival
- Part of: Salem Downtown State Street – Commercial Street Historic District (ID01001067)
- NRHP reference No.: 88000275
- Added to NRHP: April 8, 1988

The Grand Theatre is part of a complex of historic buildings in Salem, Oregon, United States that was originally owned by the fraternal organization Independent Order of Odd Fellows, and listed on the National Register of Historic Places (NRHP) as the Chemeketa Lodge No. 1, Odd Fellows Buildings. The theater building is also known as the I.O.O.F. Temple.

The Grand Theatre was built as a lodge hall and opera house by the Oddfellows in 1900, and was designed by the architectural firm of Pugh & Gray. The Julius Grau Opera Company performed at the grand opening on November 29, 1900. An annex containing a hotel and bus terminal and designed by architect Morris Whitehouse was built in 1921. The two former I.O.O.F. buildings were added to the NRHP in 1988. The buildings currently hold retail businesses, offices, and a ballroom with other facilities that are rented for special events and even lends itself as a film and music venue. Enlightened Theatrics previously performed several Broadway style live performances each year at the Grand Theatre until they closed in 2023. The theater is now operated by To The Ceiling Entertainment as multi-use performing arts and entertainment venue.

The Grand Theatre has main floor and balcony seating. The Film Daily Yearbook of 1947 listed the Grand Theatre having 744 seats. Over the years, the seating capacity has been reduced to 402 seats. There are 15 rows on the main floor with 288 seats and 5 rows in the balcony with 114 seats.

== See also ==
- Reed Opera House and McCornack Block Addition
- Elsinore Theater
- Capitol Theater (Salem, Oregon)
