= Cyrus A. Reed =

American politician

Cyrus Adams Reed (June 5, 1825 – July 11, 1910) was an adjutant general in the U.S. state of Oregon in the 1860s, and a member of the Oregon Legislative Assembly.

Reed was born June 5, 1825, in Manchester, New Hampshire. He came to Portland in 1849, and married Lucinda Coffin, daughter of General Stephen Coffin, shortly thereafter. He was the first president and custodian of the Portland Public Library Association.

He relocated to Salem, Oregon, for a time, establishing Reed's Opera House there, before returning to Portland.

== Works authored ==
- Adjutant General's Report to the Oregon Legislature, 1865–66.
