= C. S. McNally =

American architect

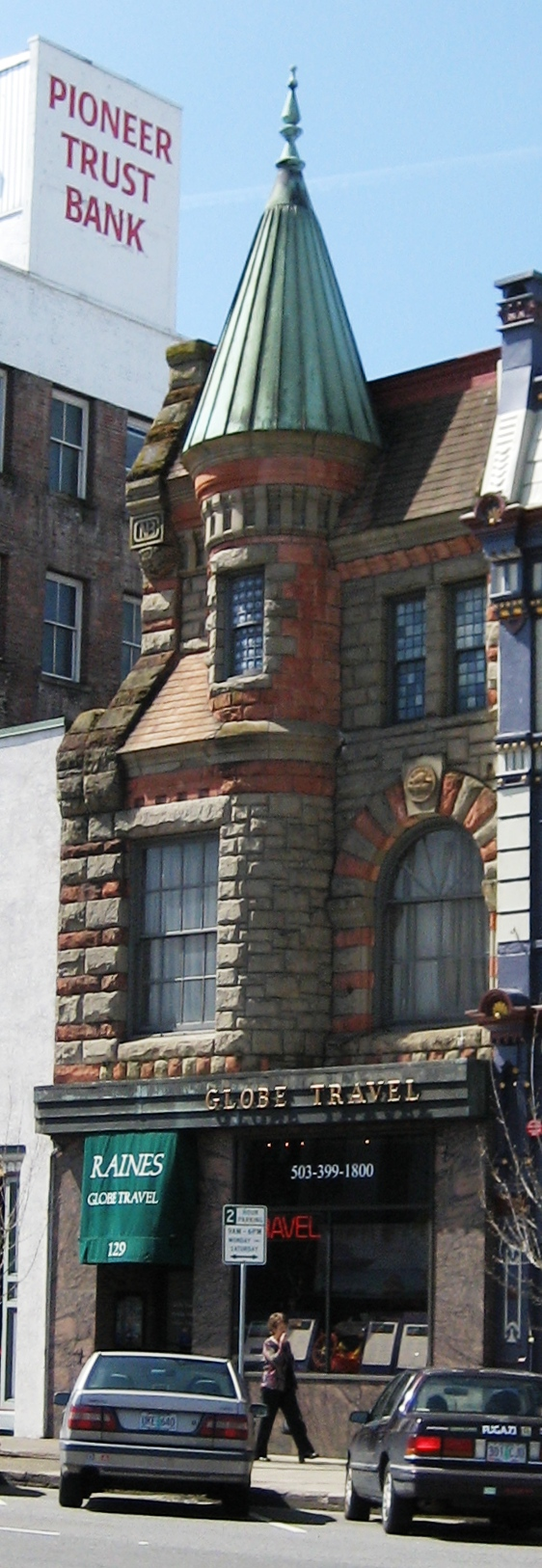
Former Capital National Bank Building in Salem

Cornelius Sarsfield McNally was an American architect in Salem, Oregon, whose work included an 1892 remodel of the facade for the Capital National Bank Building (part of the Salem's downtown historic district) built in 1880. It was remodeled again in 1950. The building closely resembles Philadelphia's First National Bank of the Republic by Frank Furness (1884).

Originally from Canada, McNally designed many buildings with draftsman William C. Knighton in the late 1880s. The keystone in the arch over one of the second story windows bears the facsimile of the beaver dollar, a $10 gold piece minted in 1849 when Oregon was a territory. The builders were Erixson and Luker who used Utah red and Tenino grey sandstone on the facade and two columns of polished Scotch granite support a half-arch doorway.
