= Ironton (town), Wisconsin =

Ironton, Wisconsin
- Town
- Town of Ironton
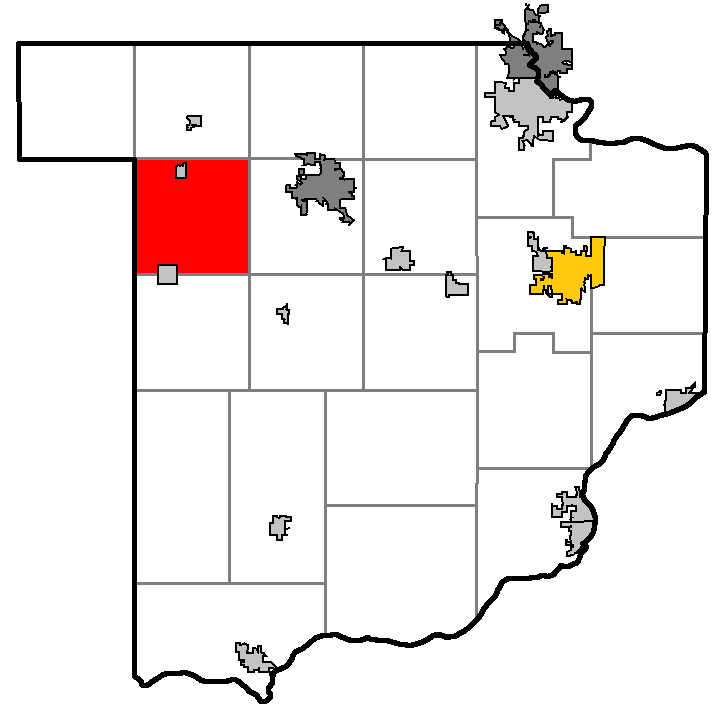
- Location of Ironton within Sauk County, Wisconsin

- Location of Sauk County, Wisconsin
- Coordinates: 43°31′21″N 90°08′40″W
- Country: United States
- State: Wisconsin
- County: Sauk

Area
  - Total: 35.17 sq mi (91.1 km^{2})
  - Land: 35.11 sq mi (90.9 km^{2})
  - Water: 0.06 sq mi (0.16 km^{2})

Population (2020)
  - Total: 662
  - Density: 18.9/sq mi (7.28/km^{2})
- Time zone: UTC-6 (Central (CST))
  - Summer (DST): UTC-5 (CDT)
- Area code(s): 608 and 353
- GNIS feature ID: 1583436
- Website: https://www.townofironton.com/

Ironton is a town in Sauk County, Wisconsin, United States. The population was 662 at the 2020 census. The town was named from deposits of iron ore in the area. The Village of Ironton is located within the town.

== Geography ==
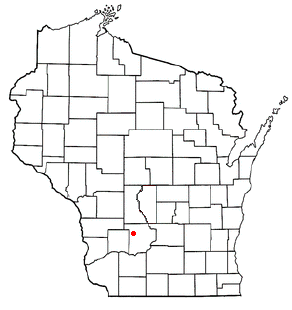
Location of Ironton (town), Wisconsin

According to the United States Census Bureau, the town has a total area of 35.2 square miles (91.1 km^{2}), of which 35.2 square miles (91.1 km^{2}) is land and 0.03% is water.

== Demographics ==
As of the census of 2000, there were 650 people, 209 households, and 169 families residing in the town. The population density was 18.5 people per square mile (7.1/km^{2}). There were 221 housing units at an average density of 6.3 per square mile (2.4/km^{2}). The racial makeup of the town was 99.69% White, 0.15% Black or African American, and 0.15% from two or more races. 0.62% of the population were Hispanic or Latino of any race.

There were 209 households, out of which 41.6% had children under the age of 18 living with them, 70.3% were married couples living together, 5.3% had a female householder with no husband present, and 19.1% were non-families. 14.8% of all households were made up of individuals, and 8.1% had someone living alone who was 65 years of age or older. The average household size was 3.11 and the average family size was 3.48.

The population was 32.9% under the age of 18, 7.5% from 18 to 24, 24.0% from 25 to 44, 24.5% from 45 to 64, and 11.1% who were 65 years of age or older. The median age was 37 years. For every 100 females, there were 105.7 males. For every 100 females age 18 and over, there were 102.8 males.

The median income for a household in the town was $41,705, and the median income for a family was $44,792. Males had a median income of $26,750 versus $21,250 for females. The per capita income for the town was $16,774. About 8.2% of families and 17.6% of the population were below the poverty line, including 33.0% of those under age 18 and 6.2% of those age 65 or over.
