= Bush–Breyman Block =

- U.S. National Register of Historic Places
- U.S. Historic district – Contributing property
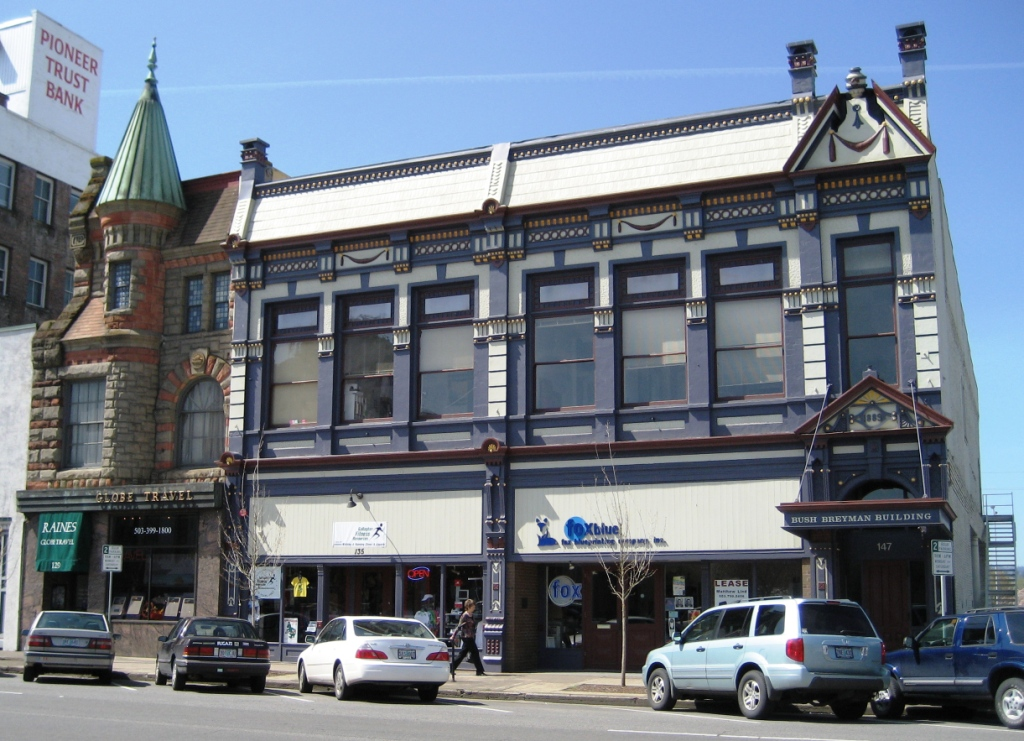
- Breyman portion of the block
- Location: 141–147 Commercial Street, NE; Salem, Oregon
- Coordinates: 44°56′28″N 123°02′26″W
- Area: 0.2 acres (0.081 ha)
- Built: 1889
- Architect: Pugh, Walter D.
- Architectural style: Queen Anne
- Part of: Salem Downtown State Street – Commercial Street Historic District (ID01001067)
- NRHP reference No.: 78002298
- Added to NRHP: February 17, 1978

The Bush–Breyman Block, located in Salem, Oregon, is listed on the National Register of Historic Places.
