= Thomas A. Livesley =

American politician (1863–1947)

Thomas Albert Livesley

Member of the Oregon House of Representatives from the 12th district
- In office 1937–1938

Mayor of Salem, Oregon
- In office 1927–1931
- Preceded by: I.B. Giesy
- Succeeded by: P.M. Gregory

Personal details
- Born: December 8, 1863 Ironton, Wisconsin
- Died: July 22, 1947 (aged 83) Salem, Oregon
- Party: Democratic
- Spouse: Myrta E. Hubble (divorced 1903) Edna Irene Debeck
- Children: Dorothy, Thomas, Roderick, Mary
- Occupation: Hop farmer, businessman

Thomas A. Livesley (December 8, 1863 – July 22, 1947) was an American businessman and politician in the state of Oregon. A successful hop farmer and broker, Livesley was known as the "Hop King" of Oregon. Livesley served as mayor of Salem and as a state representative.

He was the original builder and owner of what is still considered to be the tallest commercial building in Salem. The mansion he had built for his family, Mahonia Hall, now serves as the Governor's official residence for the State of Oregon.

== Early life and career ==
Thomas Livesley was born in Ironton, Wisconsin, on December 8, 1863, to Samuel Livesley and Margaret "Ellen" Maddock Livesley. Samuel Livesley was a hop farmer in Wisconsin and Washington. Thomas moved to Salem, Oregon, in 1894. Shortly after arriving in the city he bought the first of several hop farms that would become known as the T.A. Livesley Co.

T.A. Livesley hop buildings and farm equipment 1913 courtesy Marion County Historical Society

In 1915, the company produced as many as a million pounds of hops, one tenth of all hops produced in Oregon at the time and one thirtieth of all hops produced worldwide. In 1924, his Lakebrook Farms was one of the first in the state to provide day care, a school, playgrounds and medical facilities for seasonal workers on its grounds. During Prohibition, the company was large enough to sell its product overseas and it survived the downturn suffered by many hop farmers. Livesley would also expand into Canada, and at one time he was the President of the Canadian Hop Growers Association.

In time Livesley would expand into other business ventures. He was vice president of Oregon Linen Mills and in 1927 he erected the 11-story First National Bank Building, later known as the Livesley Building following his death in 1947 and now known as the Capitol Center. The building, designed by architect L.L. Dougan, is incorrectly claimed by some to have been the tallest in Oregon at the time but other buildings in Portland were older and taller. The Capitol Center is the tallest commercial building in Salem. Earlier, Livesley had commissioned Ellis F. Lawrence, later founder of the University of Oregon School of Architecture, to design and build a personal home. The Tudor-style mansion is now on the National Register of Historic Places (as the T. A. Livesley House) and in 1988 was purchased by citizens with private donations and donated to the state; it now serves as the official residence of the governor and their family, renamed Mahonia Hall.

== Political career ==
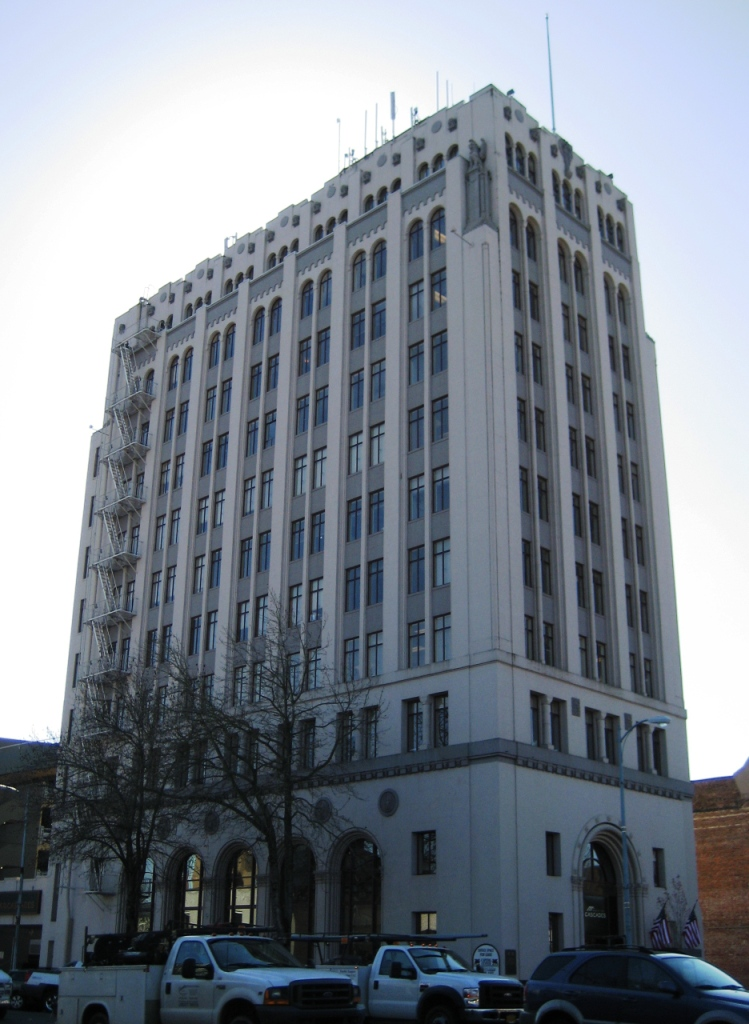
Capitol Center

Elected Mayor of Salem in 1927, he presided over a number of public works in the city that included bridge building, paving of major streets, the installation of street lights and traffic signals and the construction of the Salem Municipal Airport (McNary Field). He became known as the "Good Roads Mayor". Livesley was also an advocate of a city council-city manager form of government which the city adopted before his death and still uses today.

In 1936, he was elected to the Oregon House of Representatives and served in the 1937 legislative session. Livesley was a Democrat from District 12, representing Salem and Marion County. He was not re-elected in 1938.
