= Crook County Courthouse =

Courthouse in Prineville, Oregon, U.S.

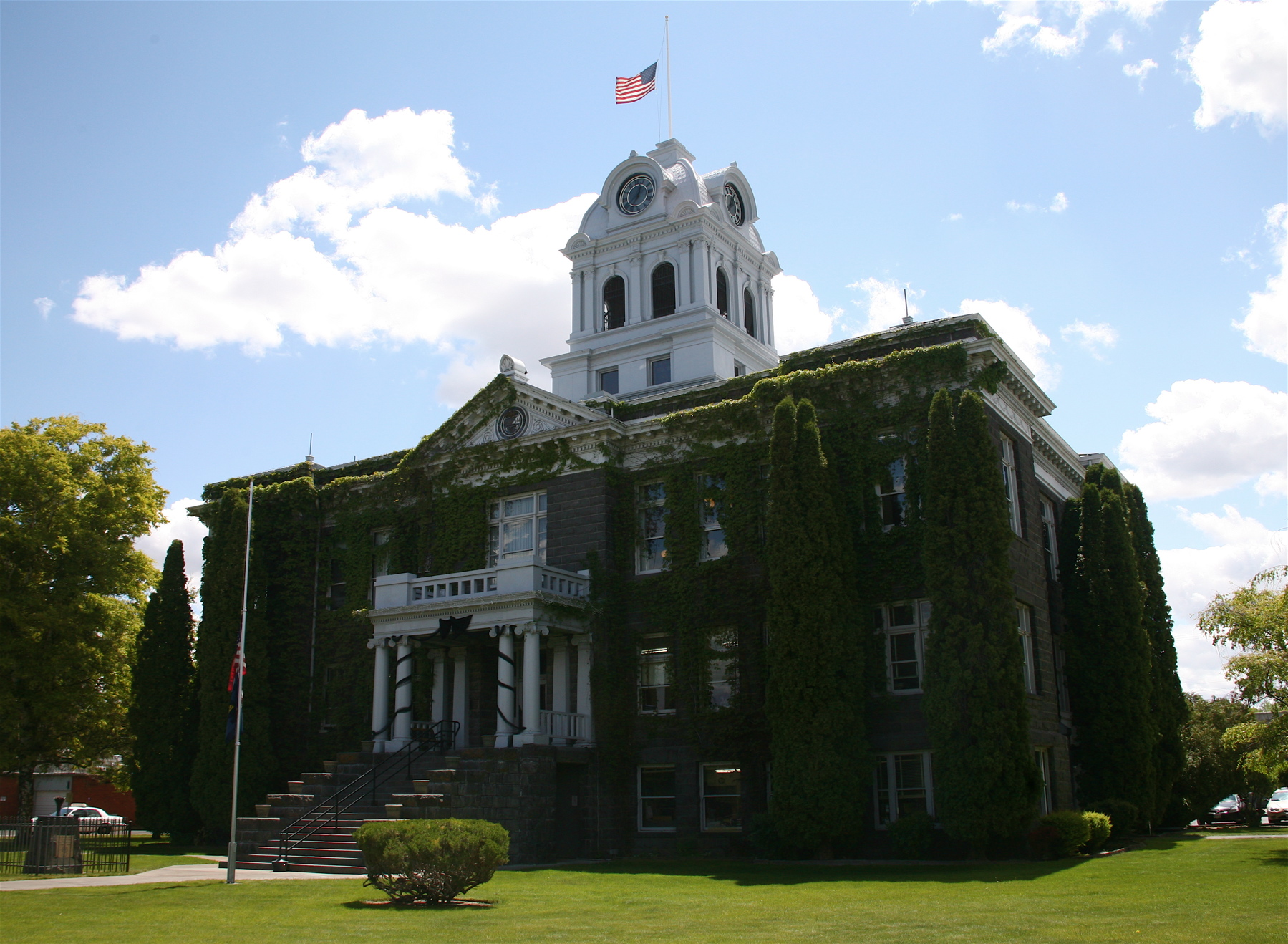
- The building's front exterior in 2007
- Interactive map of the Crook County Courthouse area

General information
- Location: 300 NE Third Street; Prineville, Oregon, U.S.
- Coordinates: 44.3024°N 120.8439°W
- Completed: 1909

Design and construction
- Architect: Walter D. Pugh

Crook County Courthouse is a courthouse located in Prineville, Oregon, United States. The present courthouse, built in 1909, replaced an earlier one built in 1889. In November 2021, voters of Crook County, Oregon, approved a bond measure to raise up to $35 million to build a new Justice Center on a different site.

== History ==
=== Construction ===
The second Crook County Courthouse was completed in February 1886 at a cost of $5,474. The contractor was H. A. Belknap.

On February 4, 1904, the 1889 courthouse was partially destroyed by fire.

In January 1907, the Crook County Commission let out a contract for construction of a new courthouse at a cost of $50,000. The contract went to the Prineville Construction Company. The building was to be paid for with $43,500 from the county, and $6,500 raised by a subscription from the citizens of Prineville.

The new Crook County Courthouse was completed in May 1909. It had been designed by the architect Walter D. Pugh and built under the direction of the contractor John B. Shipp.

=== 1962 renovation ===
In July 1962, the county began a project of lowering the ceilings in the circuit courtroom. According to county judge Erwin Grimes, the ceiling was to be lowered by three and a half (3.5) feet and faced with acoustic tile. There had been complaints, including from circuit court judge Robert H. Foley, that sound during trials echoed off the ceiling and made it difficult to hear. The floor of the courtroom was to be covered by plywood and asphalt tile. The work was to be done by a Prineville contractor at a cost of about $6,300. This was the first significant renovation since the jail in the basement had been converted to office space.

== Description ==
The Crook County Courthouse consists of a basement, two main floors, an attic, and a clock tower. The 47-ton clock tower features a 1907 clock with an original crank system that is wound once a week. The building also includes the Crook County Clerk's Office, which maintains historic records dating back to 1882.

As built, the basement was 11 feet high, with walls all above ground, and built of gray stone quarried about one mile west of the courthouse site. By the end of August, 1907, the basement was nearly complete. The basement was intended to contain three large vaults and the jail.

The dimensions of the ground plan for the courthouse were 75 by 107 feet. The first and second stories above basement were to be 17 and 14 feet high, respectively. There were to be three solid stone approaches to the building which itself was to be built of brick with stone trim.

Shortly after completion, the Crook County Journal touted the structure as "the finest in Eastern Oregon".

== Replacement ==
By 2021, proposals to replace the courthouse were considered. It was characterized as: "It's beautiful from the outside, but cramped and crumbling within. Old vaults are now offices and there is no air conditioning or privacy. Safety and security are severely compromised, leaving everyone vulnerable to the risk of human or natural disaster." A new justice center was proposed to be built on a different site, with the old courthouse to have its structure reinforced and then converted into county offices.

In an election held on November 8, 2021, Crook County voters approved a bond issue to raise up to $35 million for a new justice center on a different site.
