= Shelton McMurphey Johnson House =

Historic house in Oregon, United States

- Shelton McMurphey Johnson House and Grounds
- U.S. National Register of Historic Places
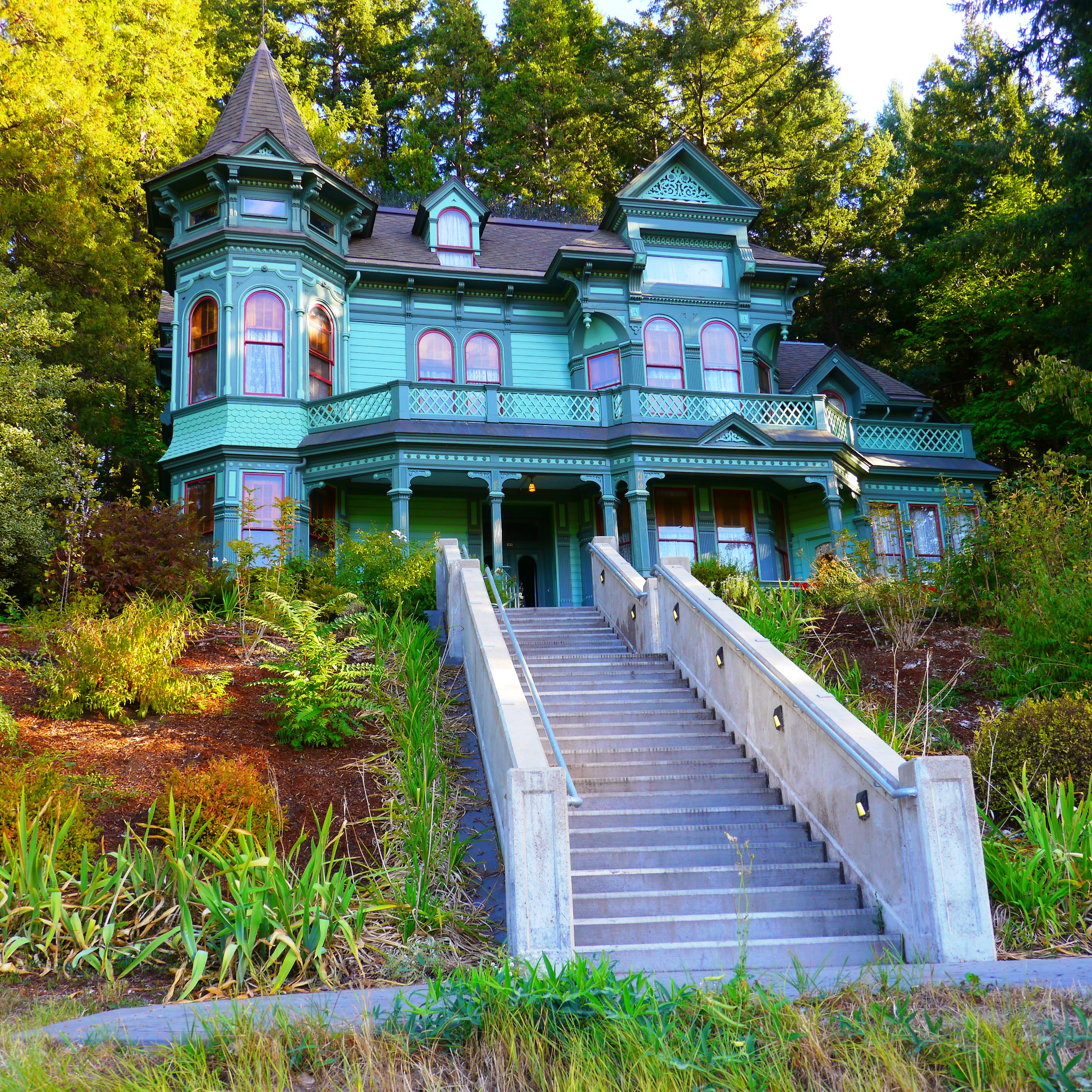
- Shelton McMurphey Johnson House

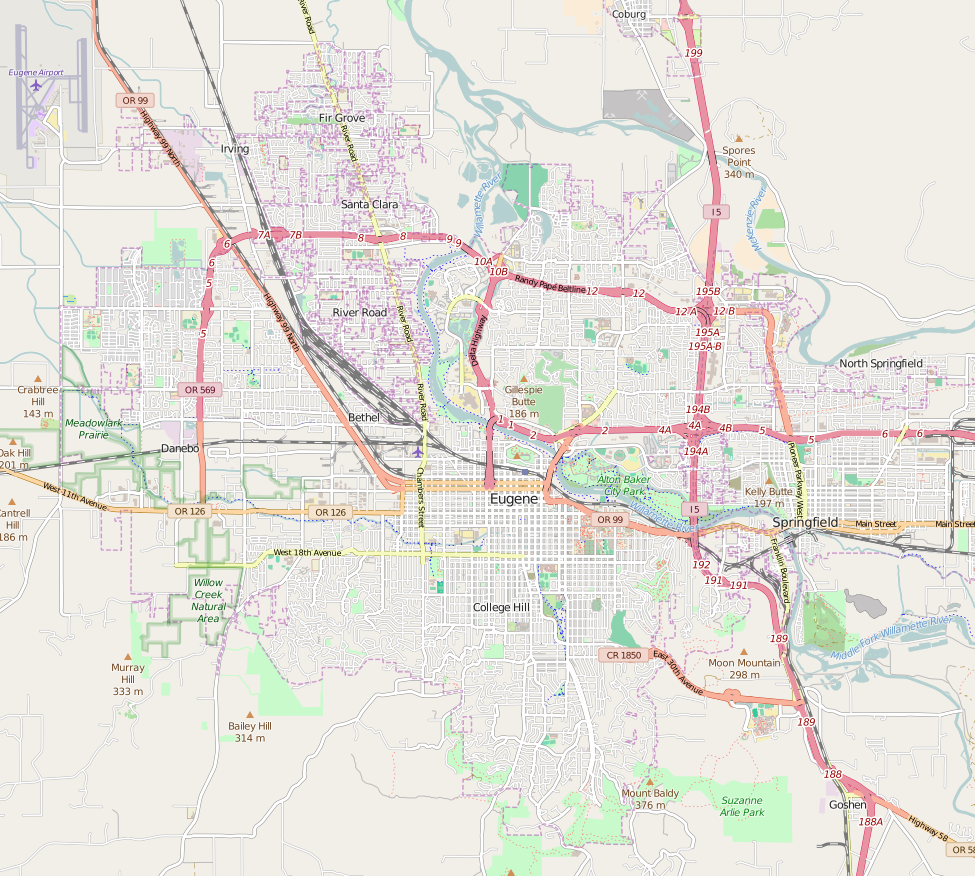
- Location within Eugene OR Location within Oregon
- Location: 303 Willamette St., Eugene, Oregon
- Coordinates: 44°3′23″N 123°5′31.7″W
- Built: 1888
- Architect: Walter D. Pugh, Nels Roney & W. H. Abrams
- Architectural style: Queen Anne
- NRHP reference No.: 84003028
- Added to NRHP: June 14, 1984

The Shelton McMurphey Johnson House, in Eugene, Oregon, United States, is a Victorian-era residence that is listed on the National Register of Historic Places. It is named for the three families who called it home over the years. The house is now open for public tours and pre-arranged private events.

== Location ==
The house is located at 303 Willamette Street in Eugene, on the south side of Skinner Butte, overlooking the train depot and the city's downtown.

== History ==
The Queen Anne-styled house, built in 1888 for T. W. Shelton, was designed by Salem, Oregon architect Walter D. Pugh. It has undergone several modifications, including an enlargement in the 1910s for Robert McMurphey, and a remodel by Curtis and Eva Johnson in 1951, which restored its original turret. The house suffered two major fires, one during its initial construction and a second one in 1950 during the Johnson remodel.

The house was deeded to Lane County by Eva Johnson in 1976. It is now owned by the City of Eugene and kept open to the public by Shelton McMurphey Johnson Associates, a nonprofit group.

== Architecture and site ==
The Queen Anne-styled house is a recognizable city structure due to its high decorative carved wood, large circular tower, and green exterior paint and trim. The house is two stories tall with a basement and an attic with an estimated 54' x 37' dimension rectangular plan on 1.25 acres of land. The original property site included the house, a barn, and a carriage house. A garage was added later on. Today, only the house exists. New additions include a chicken coop, a greenhouse, and a dog kennel. Many of the original trees and undergrowth still exist on the property today. The total cost of the original project in 1888 was $8,000.

The site of the house is on Skinner Butte. Skinner Butte holds historic significance to the founding of Eugene by settler Eugene Skinner. The 100 acres of land that encompasses the butte provides many recreational activities such as hiking, rock climbing, and the Shelton McMurphy Johnson house museum.
