= Ironton, Wisconsin =

- Village
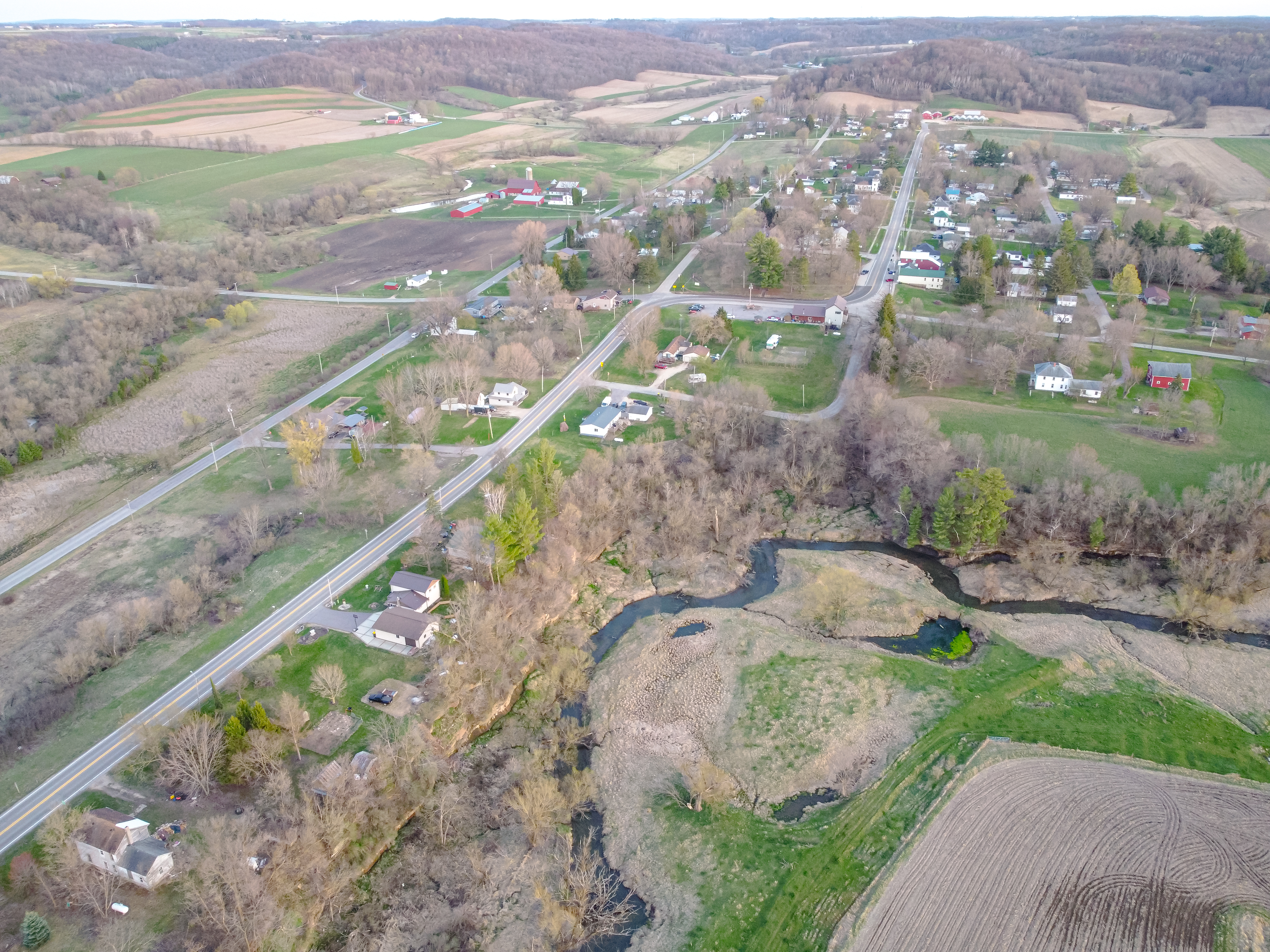
- Wis-58 and the Little Baraboo River run through town

- Location of Ironton in Sauk County, Wisconsin.
- Coordinates: 43°31′17″N 90°8′49″W
- Country: United States
- State: Wisconsin
- County: Sauk

Area
  - Total: 0.34 sq mi (0.87 km^{2})
  - Land: 0.33 sq mi (0.86 km^{2})
  - Water: 0 sq mi (0.00 km^{2})
- Elevation: 1,079 ft (329 m)

Population (2020)
  - Total: 274
  - Density: 830/sq mi (320/km^{2})
- Time zone: UTC-6 (Central (CST))
  - Summer (DST): UTC-5 (CDT)
- Area code: 608
- FIPS code: 55-37250
- GNIS feature ID: 1566977

Ironton is a village in Sauk County, Wisconsin, United States, along the Little Baraboo River. The population was 274 at the 2020 census. The village is located within the Town of Ironton.

Like the Town of Ironton, the village was named for deposits of iron ore in the area.

== Geography ==
Ironton is located at 43°32′41″N 90°8′25″W (43.544725, -90.140442).

According to the United States Census Bureau, the village has a total area of 0.33 square miles (0.85 km^{2}), all land.

== Demographics ==
Historical population
Census	Pop.	Note	%±
1880	232		—
1890	237		2.2%
1920	199		—
1930	184		−7.5%
1940	213		15.8%
1950	176		−17.4%
1960	167		−5.1%
1970	195		16.8%
1980	206		5.6%
1990	200		−2.9%
2000	250		25.0%
2010	253		1.2%
2020	274		8.3%
U.S. Decennial Census

=== 2010 census ===
As of the census of 2010, there were 253 people, 92 households, and 69 families living in the village. The population density was 766.7 inhabitants per square mile (296.0/km^{2}). There were 104 housing units at an average density of 315.2 per square mile (121.7/km^{2}). The racial makeup of the village was 95.7% White, 0.4% African American, and 4.0% from two or more races. Hispanic or Latino of any race were 1.6% of the population.

There were 92 households, of which 40.2% had children under the age of 18 living with them, 51.1% were married couples living together, 12.0% had a female householder with no husband present, 12.0% had a male householder with no wife present, and 25.0% were non-families. 16.3% of all households were made up of individuals, and 4.4% had someone living alone who was 65 years of age or older. The average household size was 2.75 and the average family size was 3.06.

The median age in the village was 30.4 years. 28.1% of residents were under the age of 18; 11.8% were between the ages of 18 and 24; 26.1% were from 25 to 44; 24.1% were from 45 to 64; and 9.9% were 65 years of age or older. The gender makeup of the village was 53.4% male and 46.6% female.

=== 2000 census ===
As of the census of 2000, there were 250 people, 89 households, and 66 families living in the village. The population density was 743.6 people per square mile (283.9/km^{2}). There were 99 housing units at an average density of 294.5 per square mile (112.4/km^{2}). The racial makeup of the village was 97.60% White and 2.40% Black or African American. 1.60% of the population were Hispanic or Latino of any race.

There were 89 households, out of which 40.4% had children under the age of 18 living with them, 59.6% were married couples living together, 6.7% had a female householder with no husband present, and 25.8% were non-families. 18.0% of all households were made up of individuals, and 6.7% had someone living alone who was 65 years of age or older. The average household size was 2.81 and the average family size was 3.21.

In the village, the population was spread out, with 32.0% under the age of 18, 6.8% from 18 to 24, 33.2% from 25 to 44, 16.4% from 45 to 64, and 11.6% who were 65 years of age or older. The median age was 32 years. For every 100 females, there were 103.3 males. For every 100 females age 18 and over, there were 109.9 males.

The median income for a household in the village was $38,438, and the median income for a family was $41,250. Males had a median income of $31,875 versus $22,292 for females. The per capita income for the village was $13,874. About 15.2% of families and 10.8% of the population were below the poverty line, including 11.4% of those under the age of eighteen and 31.8% of those 65 or over.

== Education ==
Ironton is served by the School District of Reedsburg, which has 4 elementary schools, 1 intermediate school, 1 middle school, and 1 high school. Ironton-La Valle Elementary School is the closest school to Ironton, being located in La Valle, Wisconsin.

== Notable people ==
- Moses Ransom Doyon, mayor of Madison, Wisconsin, lived in Ironton.
- Thomas A. Livesley, mayor of Salem, Oregon, was born in Ironton.
