= Adolph Block =

Historic building in Salem, Oregon, US

- U.S. National Register of Historic Places
- U.S. Historic district – Contributing property
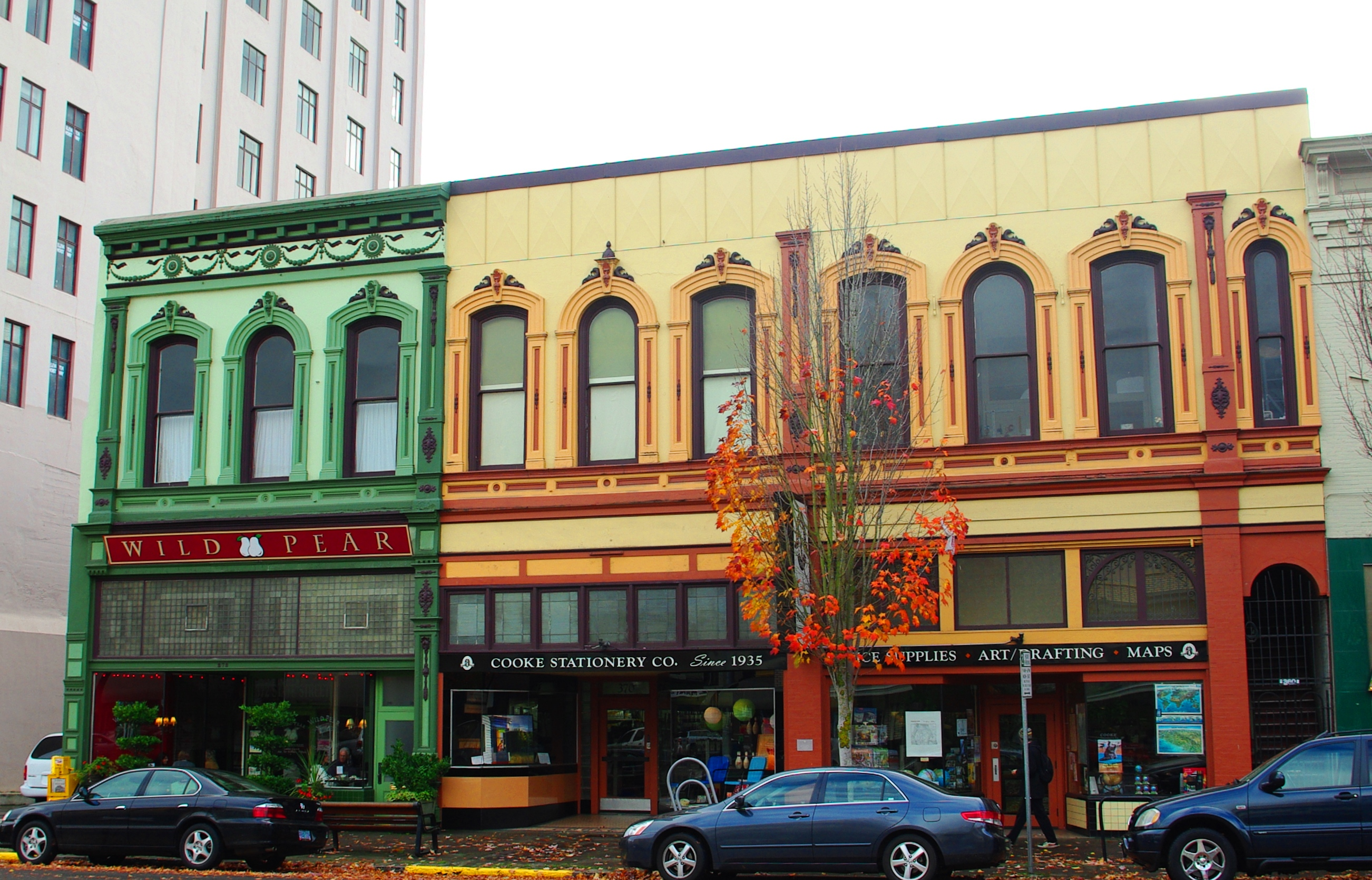
- The Adolph Block in 2009

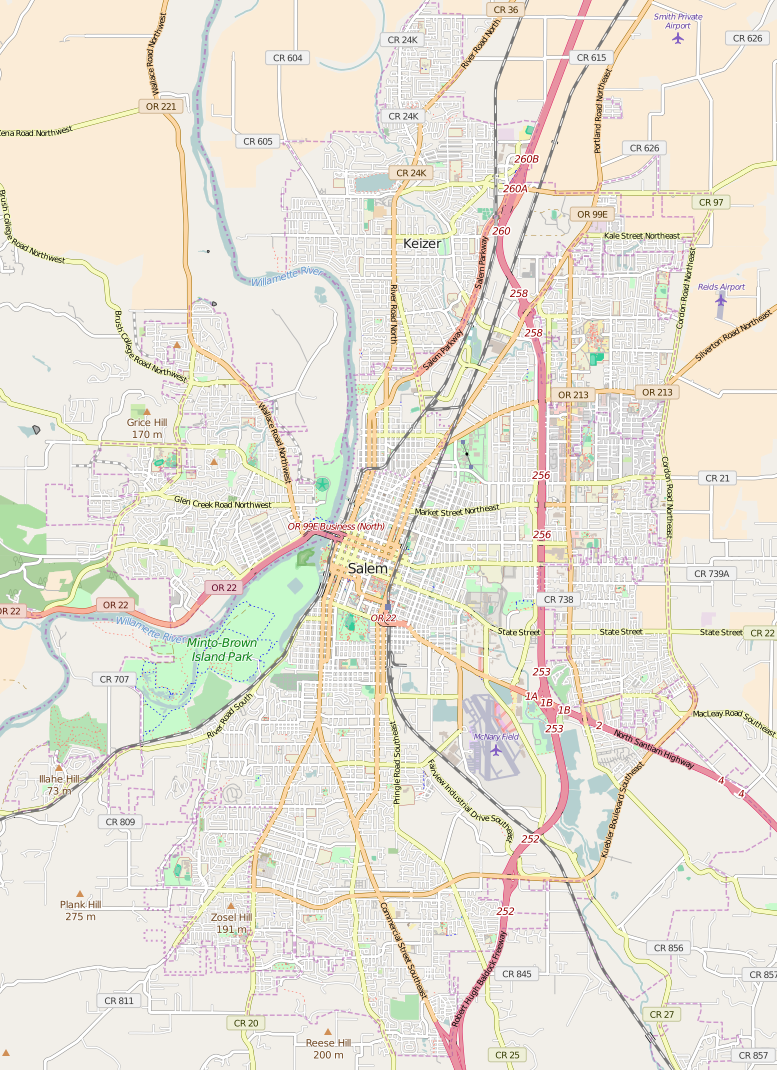
- Location within Salem OR Location within Oregon
- Location: 360–372 State Street; Salem, Oregon
- Coordinates: 44°56′24″N 123°02′22″W
- Area: 11,100.5 square feet (1,031.27 m^{2})
- Built: 1880
- Built by: J. S. Coulter
- Architect: J. S. Coulter
- Architectural style: High Victorian Italianate
- Part of: Salem Downtown State Street – Commercial Street Historic District (ID01001067)
- NRHP reference No.: 80003348
- Added to NRHP: February 1, 1980

The Adolph Block is a historic commercial building located in downtown Salem, Oregon, United States. It was constructed in 1880 by German immigrant and pioneering Salem brewer Samuel Adolph (1835–1893), who purchased the property that Summer after a fire had destroyed the previous wooden buildings on the site. It was designed and built by Salem contractor J.S. Coulter. Completed by the end of the year, It was built sharing party walls with the adjoining J. K. Gill Building (1868) to the West and the long-since demolished Gray's Block on the East, of which one cast iron column remains. Though altered many times over the past century, the Adolph Block still retains many distinctive Italianate details and is one of the finer remaining examples of the style in Salem's downtown historic district.

The building was listed on the National Register of Historic Places in 1980.

== See also ==
- National Register of Historic Places listings in Marion County, Oregon
