= Walter D. Pugh =

American architect (1863–1946)

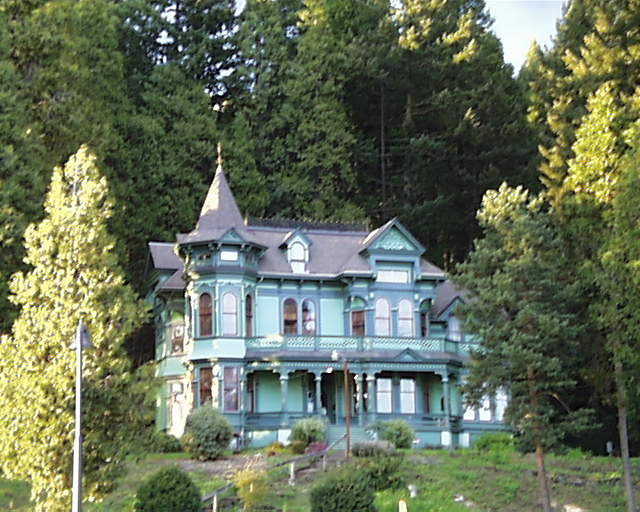
Shelton-McMurphey House and grounds

Walter David Pugh (April 4, 1863 – November 23, 1946) was an American architect based in Salem, Oregon, United States.

The son of a carpenter, Pugh began designing buildings in Salem when there were only a few thousand residents, and in Eugene when it had a little over a thousand residents. Pugh designed Salem's Oregon State Hospital buildings being constructed in 1907-1908, including an addition to the "J Building", which has since been demolished.

A number of his buildings are listed on the National Register of Historic Places (NRHP).

== Projects on the National Register ==
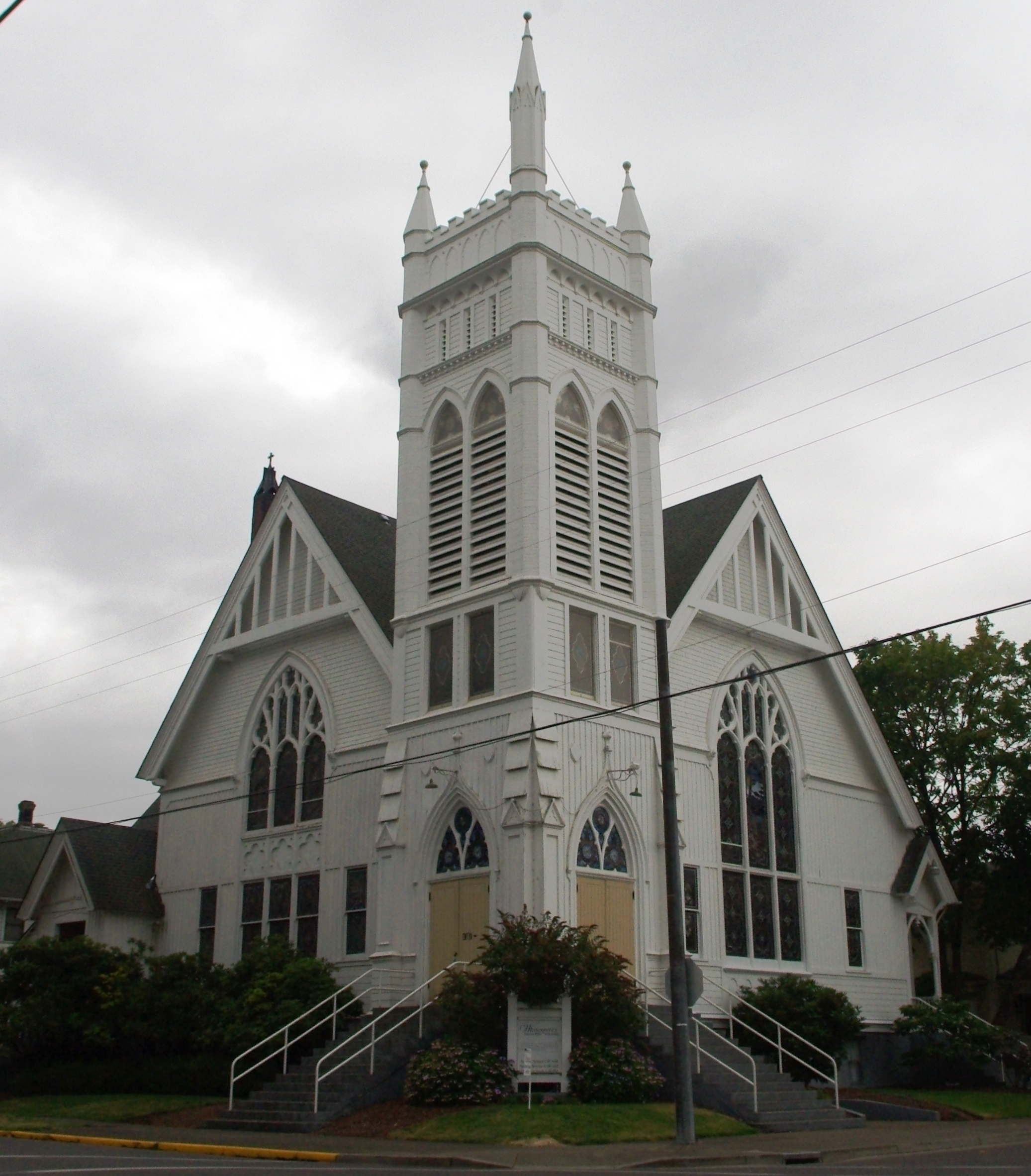
United Presbyterian Church and Rectory

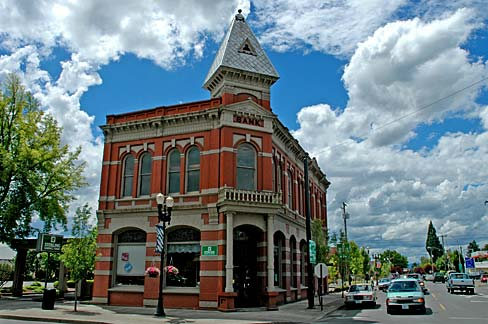
Independence National Bank in Independence, Oregon

- Shelton-McMurphey-Johnson House (1888), 303 Willamette St., Eugene
- Bush and Brey Block and Annex (1889), 179-197 Commercial St. NE, Salem, built for Asahel Bush II and Mortiz Brey, a cabinet maker
- Bush–Breyman Block (1889), 141-147 Commercial St. NE, Salem
- Independence National Bank (1891), 302 S Main St., Independence
- United Presbyterian Church and Rectory (Whitespires) (1891), 510 SW 5th Ave., Albany, with H. C. Chamberlain
- Fairbanks Hall (formerly Cauthorn Hall and Kidder Hall) (1892), Oregon State University Historic District, 220 SW 26th St., Corvallis
- Thomas Kay Woolen Mill (1895), 260 12th St. SE, Salem
- Chemeketa Lodge No. 1 Odd Fellows Buildings (Grand Theater) (1900), 185-195 High St. NE, Salem, (1921 annex designed by Morris H. Whitehouse)
- Buildings on the Oregon State Hospital campus (1907-1908), including the Eastern addition to the J Building (demolished)

== Other projects ==
- The former Salem City Hall (1893), demolished 1972 after a bond measure to preserve it failed, corner of High and Chemeketa streets
- The dome of the second Oregon State Capitol, which burned in 1935
- LeBreton Cottage (1908) at Fairview Training Center
- Crook County Courthouse (1909), located in Prineville, Oregon
- Buildings at the Chemawa Indian School
