= Elsinore Theatre =

- Elsinore Theater
- U.S. National Register of Historic Places
- U.S. Historic district – Contributing property
- Exterior of the theatre
- Location: 170 High Street, SE; Salem, Oregon, U.S.
- Coordinates: 44°56′20″N 123°02′14″W
- Built: 1926
- Architect: Lawrence & Holford
- Architectural style: Tudor; Gothic Revival
- Part of: Salem Downtown State Street – Commercial Street Historic District (ID01001067)
- MPS: Architecture of Ellis F. Lawrence MPS
- NRHP reference No.: 91001575
- Added to NRHP: June 17, 1994

The Elsinore Theatre is a historic 1,290-seat theatre located in Salem, Oregon, United States, that first opened on May 28, 1926. The theatre was added to the National Register of Historic Places in 1994.

== Early years ==
Owner George Guthrie enlisted the firm of Lawrence and Holford to design the theatre in a Tudor Gothic style meant to resemble the castle in the city of Elsinore from Shakespeare's play Hamlet. Ellis F. Lawrence, the first dean of the University of Oregon school of architecture, was the project's principal architect. The building features stained glass by the Povey Brothers and a Mighty Wurlitzer theatre organ similar to the original, which was dismantled in 1962. Originally the Elsinore was designed for live performances and silent films. Three years after its construction in 1926, Guthrie leased the theatre to Fox West Coast Theatres. It was at this time that sound movies came to the theatre.

== Decline and restoration ==
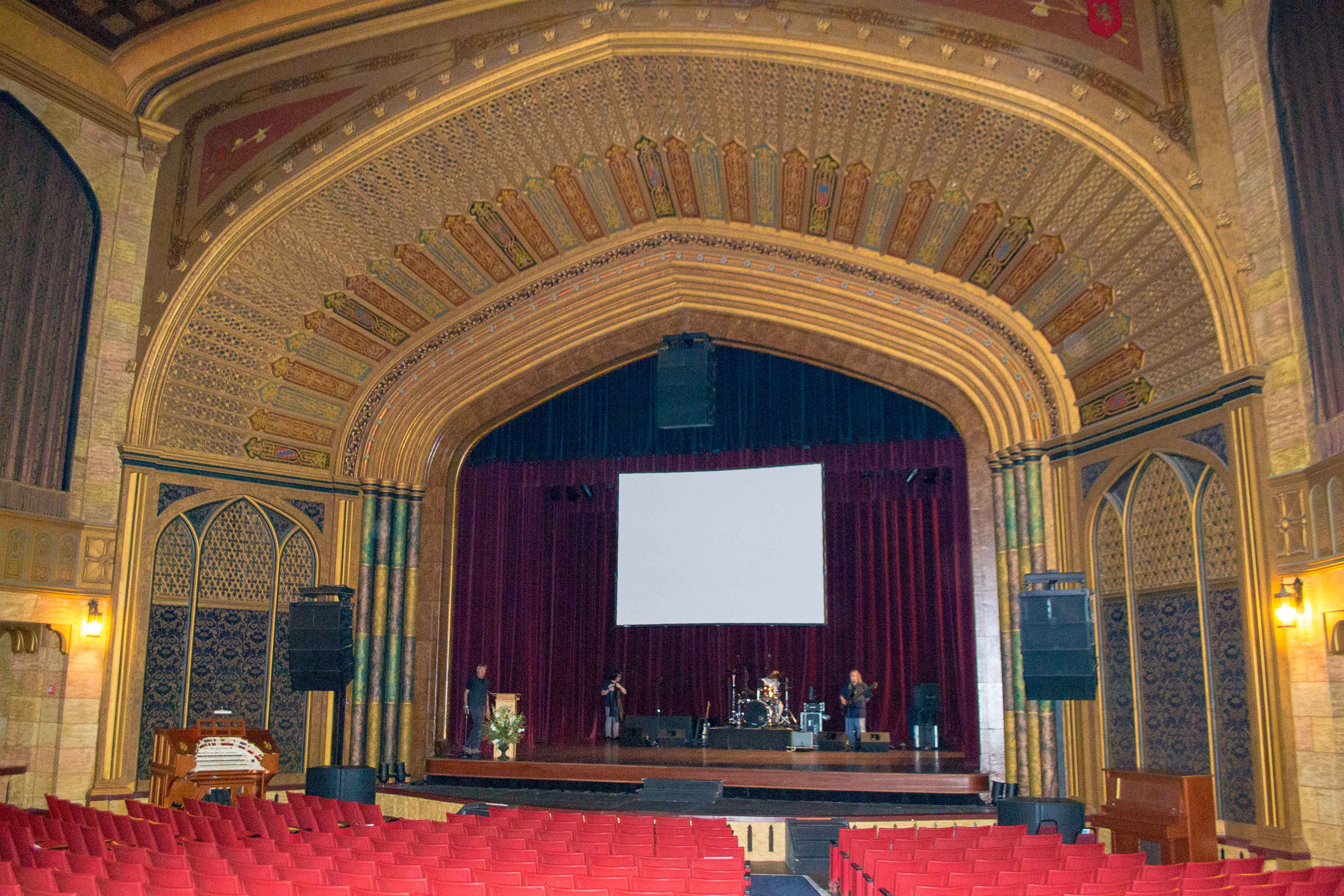
Interior of the Elsinore

In 1954, the theater began a general decline from its once great status in Salem into a second-run movie theater. In 1980, the Elsinore was set to be demolished. A grassroots effort known as the Save the Elsinore Committee did not want to let this historical treasure be demolished, and so began to work hard with local authorities to save the theater.

During the 1980s, the Save the Elsinore Committee obtained the consent of the owner to use the theater for 18 days of the year for free community events in order to spark public interest about the theater and its fate.

Until 1987, the theater was one of only three active movie theaters in downtown Salem (the others being the Capitol Theater just around the corner and an arthouse theater). Many of its customers came from Willamette University, drawn both by low admission prices and by the fact that the Elsinore was only two blocks off campus.

In approximately 1989, the theater was sold to Act III Theatres in conjunction with several other local movie theaters in the possession of Tom Moyer, who was the owner at the time. ACT III continued to allow the community to have limited use of the theater. ACT III did not have any interest in a 60-year-old movie theater however, and thus put it up for sale in 1990. The Save the Elsinore Committee jumped at the chance to gain ownership of the theater and launched a fundraising drive to purchase it. The funds were raised, and the theater was purchased. It continued to raise money for its operational costs through fundraising in the community and was graced by appearances from many stars at the turn of the millennium, most notably by actors James Earl Jones and Gregory Peck.

Finally, in February 2002, a deal was cut with CB2, the architectural firm also responsible for Salem's Riverfront Carousel, to help restore the Elsinore completely at an estimated cost of $3.2 million.
