= Pacific Building (Seattle) =

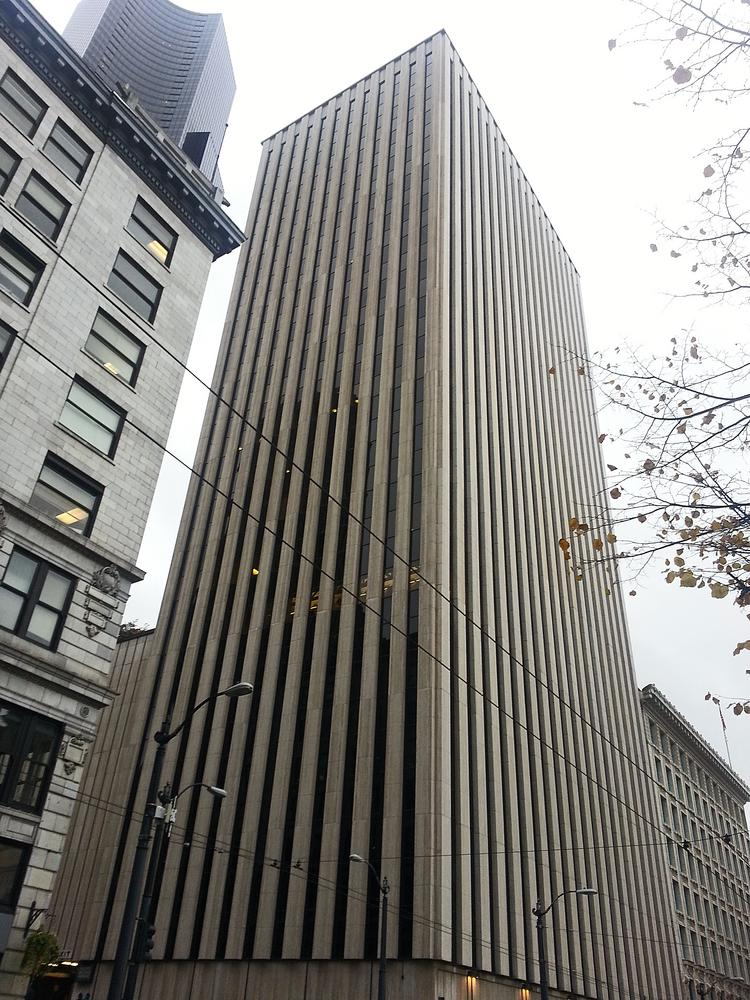
- Pacific Building

- Location within downtown Seattle

General information
- Type: Commercial offices
- Architectural style: Postmodern architecture
- Location: Seattle, Washington, 720 Third Ave.
- Coordinates: 47.6040°N 122.3322°W
- Elevation: 95 ft (29 m)
- Completed: 1971
- Owner: Brickman

Height
- Height: 286 ft (87 m)

Technical details
- Floor count: 22
- Floor area: 227,556 sq ft (21,140.6 m^{2}) (gross); 133,190 sq ft (12,374 m^{2})
- Lifts/elevators: 5

The Pacific Building is a 22-story building in the Central Business District of Downtown Seattle, Washington. It is located at 720 Third Avenue. It was completed in 1971.

== History ==
The Pacific Building Corporation, ran by prominent developer and engineer Richard H. Hadley (the son of Homer Hadley, pioneer in building floating bridges), oversaw the construction and development of the Pacific Building.

On May 16, 1968 The engineering firm Dames & Moore had completed its "Report of Soils Investigation, Proposed Multi-Story Pacific Building, Third Avenue and Columbia Street, Seattle, Washington" for the Pacific Building Corporation. The work included drilling three exploratory borings at the building site, conducting appropriate laboratory tests, and undertaking engineering analyses and evaluations to determine appropriate means of foundation support and develop foundation design criteria.

By 1995, the building was half empty, with tenants filling several of the lower floors. This was partly the cause of Continental Savings Bank (now HomeStreet Bank) terminating its lease with the Pacific Building in 1992, where it occupied around 45,000 square feet on seven floors. The bank had been headquartered there since the building opened in 1971. By 2001 roughly 90% of floor space was being utilized, during which time it was being managed by Martin Smith Inc.

On December 5, 2007 Meriwether Partners purchased the building from LHT Corporation as Pacific Building Partners LLC for $34 million or $264 per rentable square foot. At the time, the building was 86% leased by 33 tenants. The company implemented a multi-million dollar renovation plan for the interior and exterior of the building, remodeling the main floor lobby and elevator cabs, upgrading multi-tenant lobbies and corridors, improving the parking garage controls, installing a new fire sprinkler system, and installing a new canopy system along Third Avenue.

During May 2014, public records show The Office of Professional Accountability, affiliated with the Seattle Police department, entered a 10-year lease on the 18th floor, accommodating 8,226 rentable square feet. The lease rate began at $29.50 per square foot per year, with a $0.75 per square foot annual increases, ending at $36.25 per square foot per year ($307,138 per year) by 2024.

The building was sold October 2014 to Brickman for $50.35 million.

Sale Price	Price per Rentable Square Foot (RSF)	Date	Seller Name	Buyer Name
$50,350,000	$390	10/31/2014	720 3rd Avenue partners LLC	Brickman Pacific LLC
$35,450,000	$275	3/28/2013	Pacific Building Partners LLC	720 3rd Avenue partners LLC
$33,995,000	$264	12/5/2007	LHT Corporation	Pacific Building Partners LLC
$2,300,000	$18	12/30/1986	Asia Pacific Corp	LHT Corporation

== Gallery ==
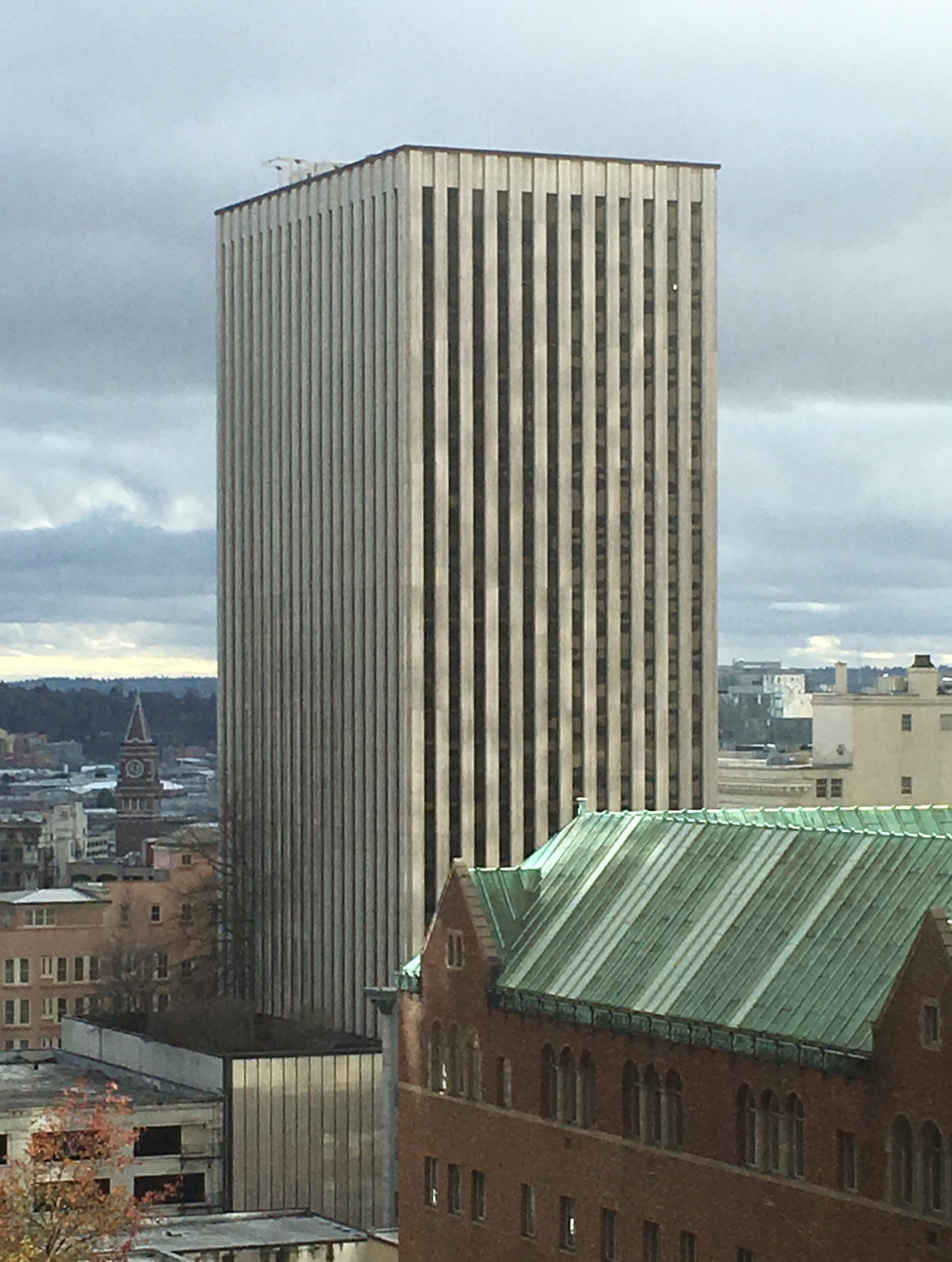
Pacific Building looking South from the Downtown Seattle Public Library.

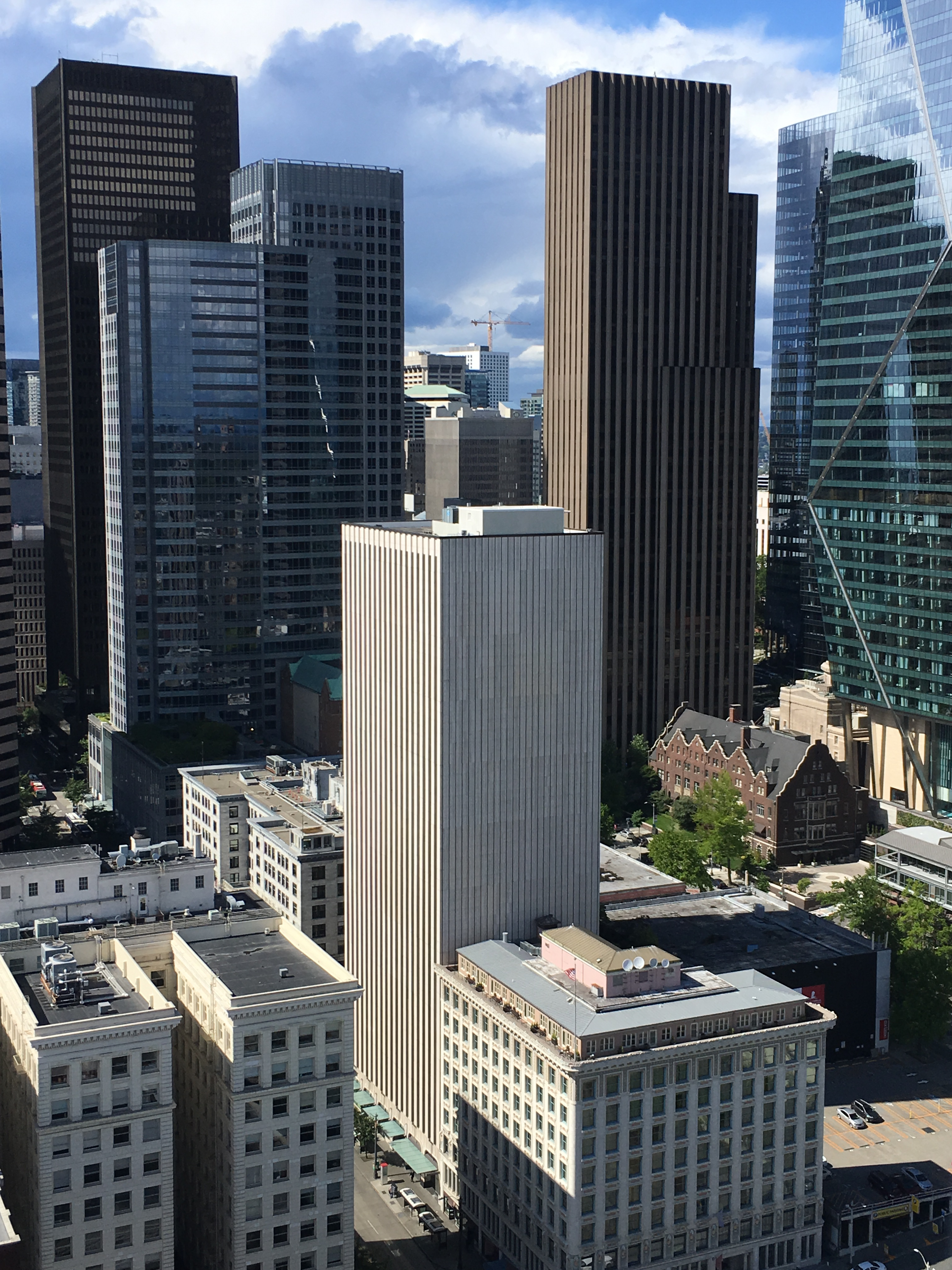
Pacific Building looking North from the Smith Tower.

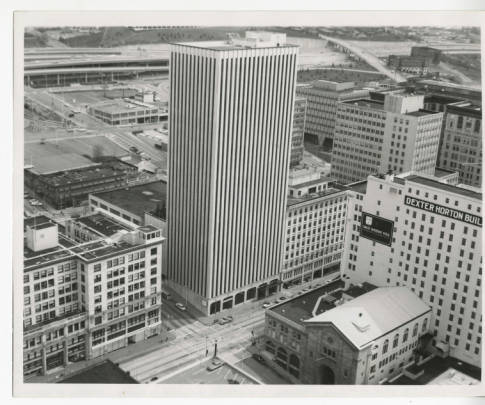
View SE from 32nd floor of Federal Bldg, April 20, 1975.

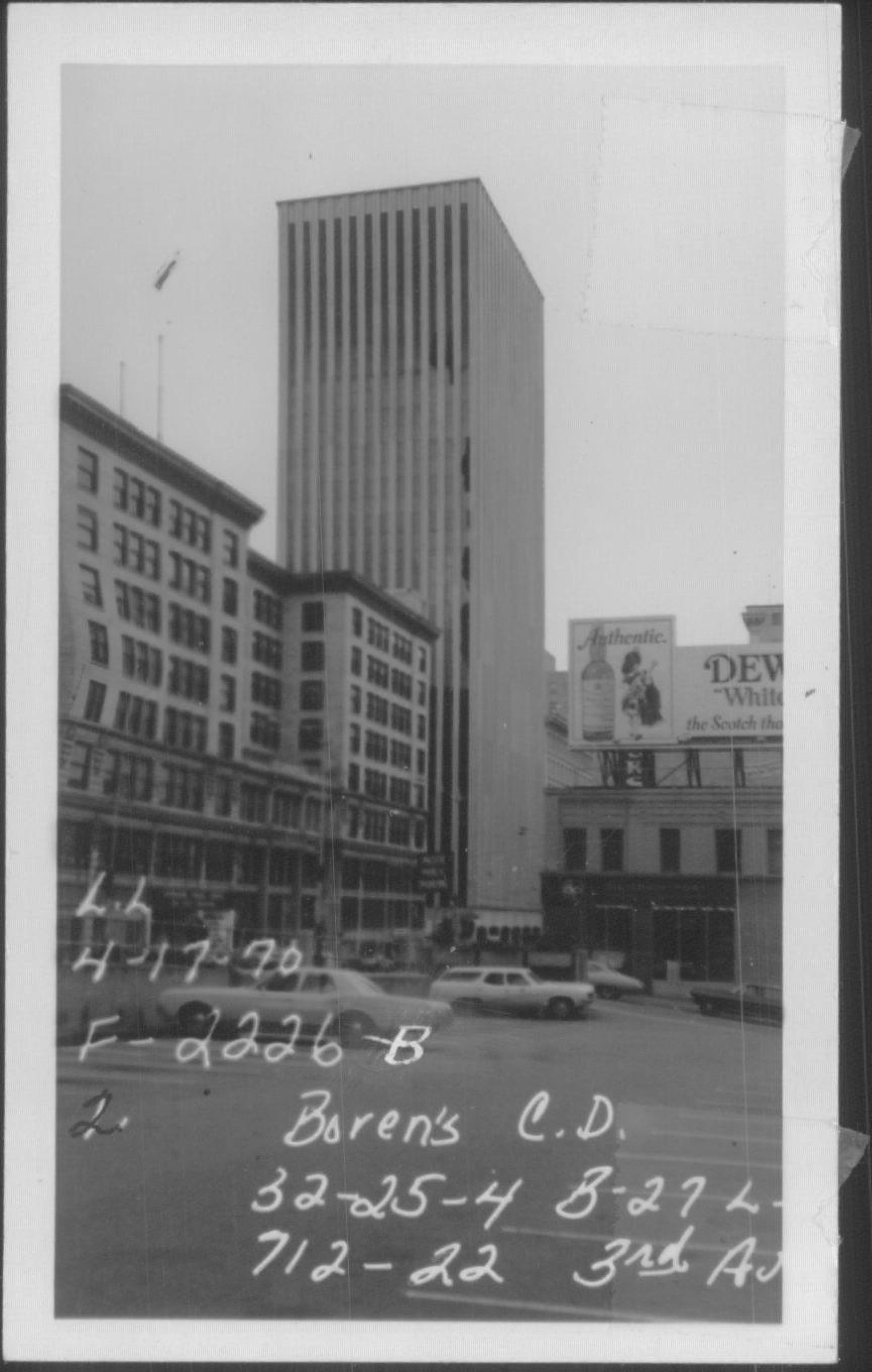
View of Pacific Building shortly before completion, from Marion Street and Third Avenue, April 17, 1970.

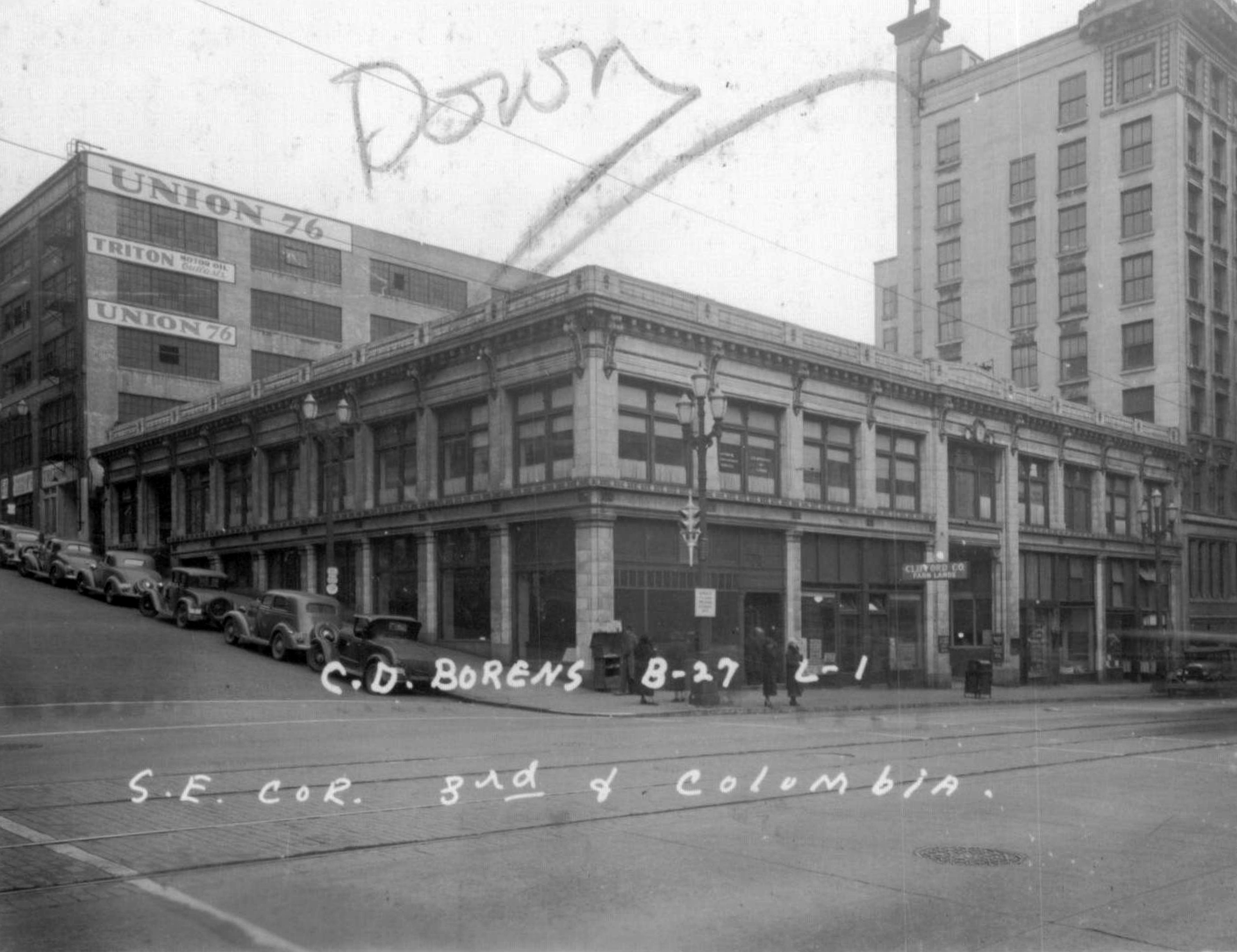
County assessor image taken at Third Avenue and Columbia Street, looking at what is now the Pacific Building, October 22, 1937.
