= Reed Opera House and McCornack Block Addition =

- U.S. National Register of Historic Places
- U.S. Historic district – Contributing property
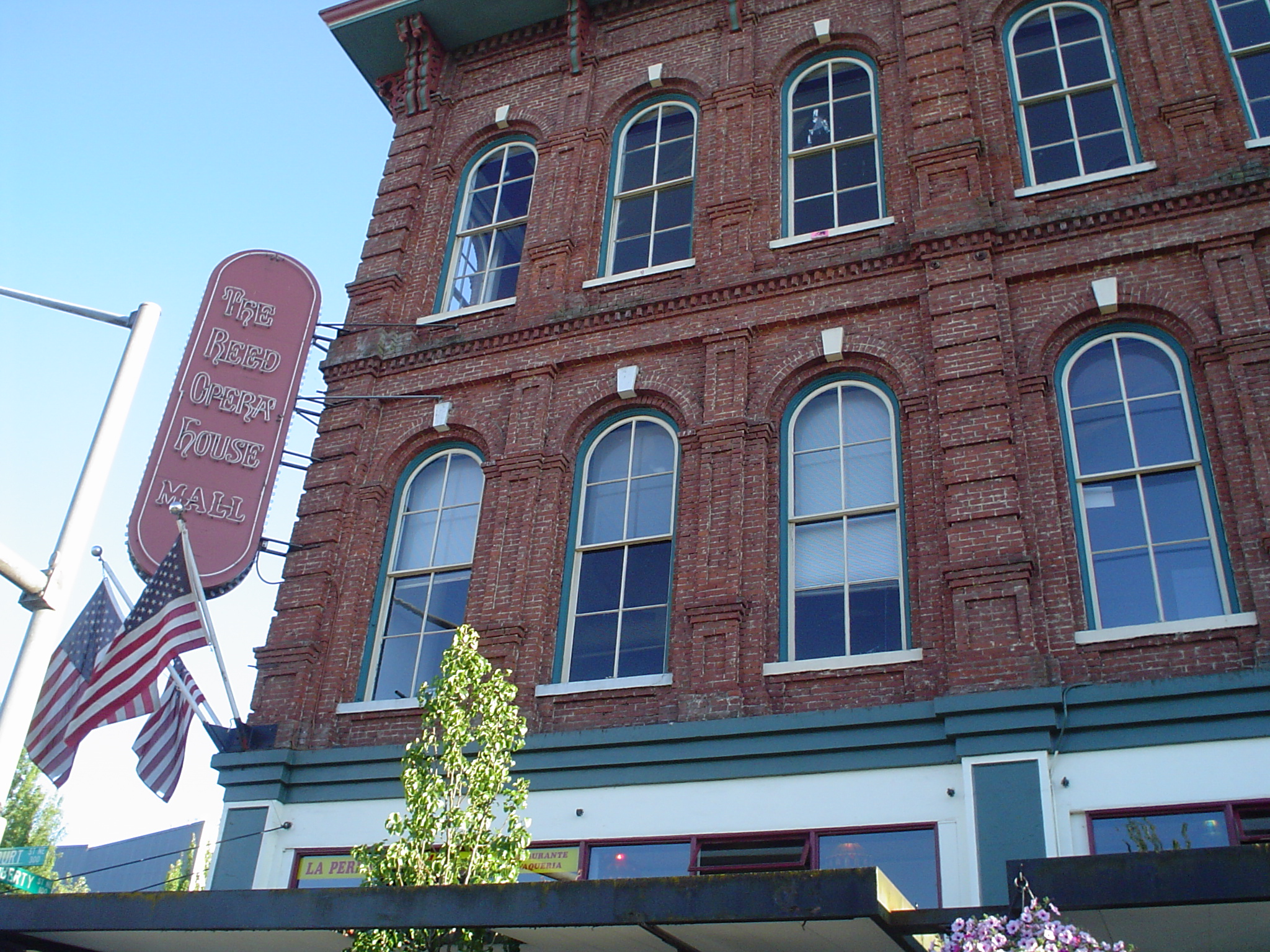
- Reed Opera House
- Location: 189 and 177 Liberty Street, NE; Salem, Oregon
- Coordinates: 44°56′28″N 123°02′20″W
- Area: less than one acre
- Built: 1869
- Architect: Rhodes, G.W.
- Architectural style: Italianate
- Part of: Salem Downtown State Street – Commercial Street Historic District (ID01001067)
- NRHP reference No.: 78002302
- Added to NRHP: March 8, 1978

The Reed Opera House and McCornack Block Addition, more commonly known as The Reed Opera House or The Reed, is a historic building in downtown Salem, Oregon, United States. Since its grand opening on September 27, 1870, the Reed Opera House has served as a performing arts center and shopping mall. The Italianate brick structure was added to the National Register of Historic Places in 1978.

== Early history ==
Construction on the Reed Opera House began in 1869 and was completed in 1870 with G. W. Rhodes as the architect. The opera house was built by Cyrus Adams Reed under a contract with the State of Oregon to provide space for the Oregon State Legislature, the Oregon Supreme Court, and the Oregon State Library. During construction, however, Oregon elected officials decided not to comply with the previous administration's contract. Since the building was already close to completion, Reed made some changes to the plan and had seven shops included on the ground floor, an opera house on the second and third floors, and a hotel in the unused space.

The Reed Opera House officially opened with the inaugural ball for Oregon Governor La Fayette Grover. It quickly became the center of Salem's entertainment and social life, playing host to touring plays, opera companies, political meetings, and community events. A number of notable performers made appearances, including local celebrity Hallie Parrish Hinges, artist/political cartoonist Thomas Nast, Susan B. Anthony, Mark Twain, presidents Rutherford B. Hayes and Benjamin Harrison and John Philip Sousa's band.

On April 20, 1900, the Reed Opera House theater officially closed. This was due to the nearby construction of the Grand Theater, which had more modern amenities and a ground floor entrance. Soon afterwards, Joseph Meyers and Sons, who leased the property from E.P. McCornack, and who had purchased Reed's interest in the building in 1885, converted the theater and the majority of the retail space into a department store. In 1902, McCornack added a two-story building to the Reed Opera House in order to house a furniture store. In 1920, both buildings were purchased and occupied by Miller's Department Store.

== Recent history ==
Miller's Department Store continued to occupy the buildings until 1976. At that time, the buildings were purchased by realtor Coburn Grabenhorst Sr. and architects Phil Settecase and Howard Smith. At the cost of US$1,000,000, the buildings were updated to assume their present configuration.

The new layout of the Reed included a number of retail boutiques and restaurants on the lower level, first floor, mezzanine, and second floor. It prospered until a large mall was built nearby in the late 1980s. Because of ensuing financial difficulty, the deeds to the Reed Opera House and the McCornack addition were turned over to the bank that financed the redevelopment. In 1993, Bourne Properties purchased the deeds to the Reed Opera House.

Roger Yost, a former marketing vice president of Jantzen Apparel, purchased the Reed Opera House from Bourne Properties in 2003. Since he gained ownership, he has undertaken a remodeling project to expand the building, as well as to restore some of its original features. He has remodeled what is now known as the Trinity Ballroom and the kitchen for $50,000 and modernized the elevators for $175,000. He replicated the rooftop pediment, corona, and architectural brackets of the original building for $180,000, having won a $100,000 prize from a contest sponsored by Salem's Urban Renewal agency to assist with the restoration. In addition to remodeling, Yost added a number of vintage advertisements for his former employer, Jantzen Swimwear (as it was formerly known), throughout the public areas of the Reed.
