= Pacific Building (Salem, Oregon) =

- Bligh Building/Pacific Building
- U.S. Historic district – Contributing property
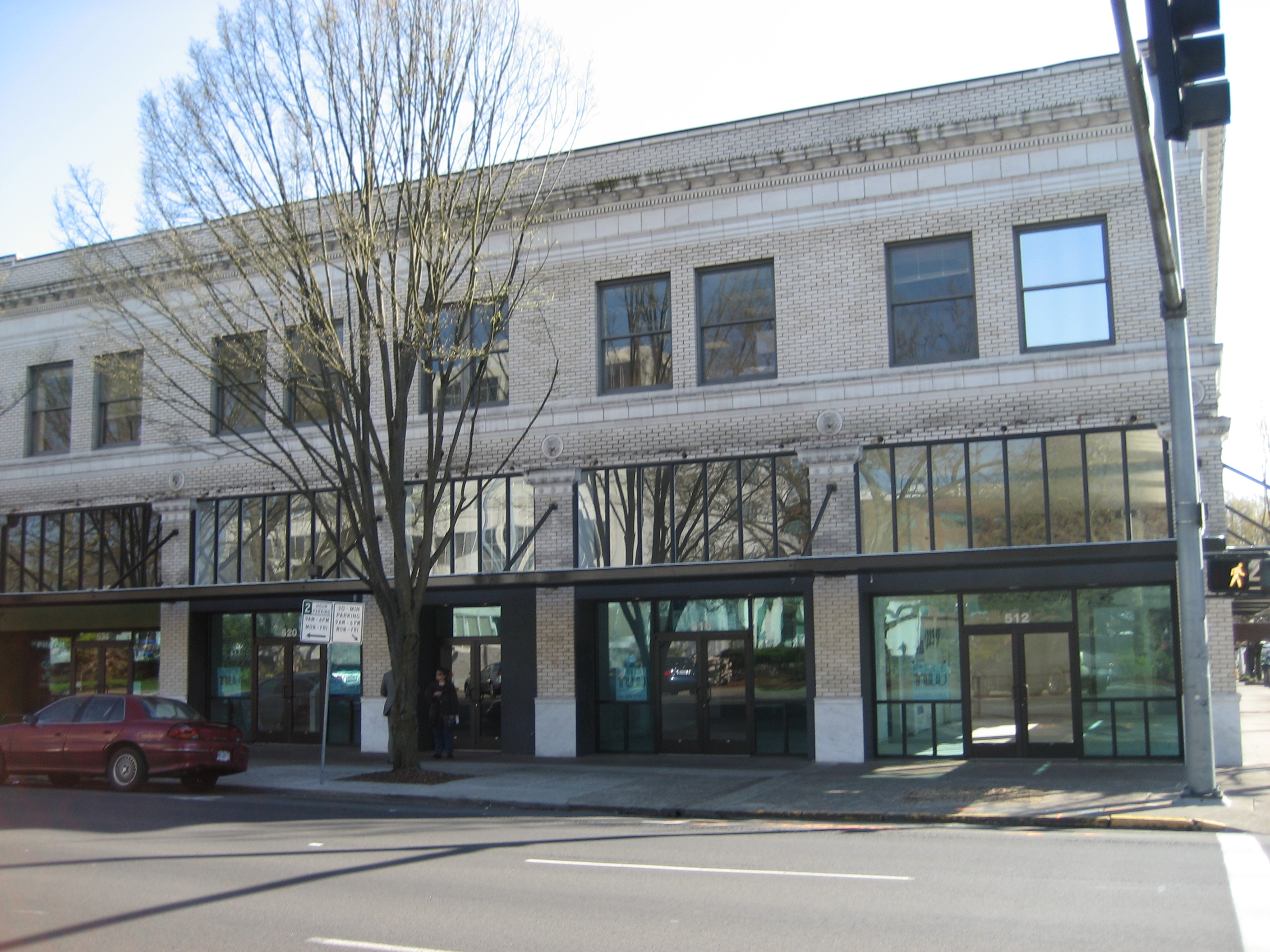

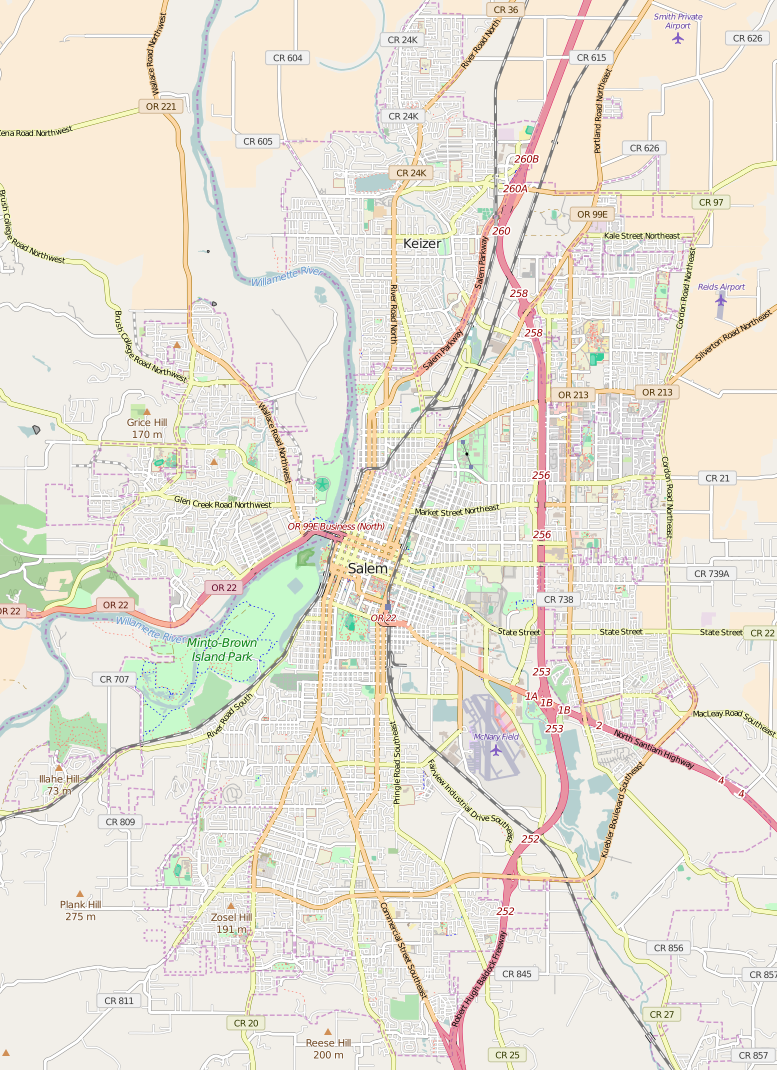
- Location within Salem OR Location within Oregon
- Location: 508–524 State Street; Salem, Oregon
- Coordinates: 44°56′22″N 123°2′13″W
- Built: 1926
- Architect: Tourtellotte & Hummel
- Architectural style: Commercial style
- Part of: Salem Downtown State Street – Commercial Street Historic District (ID01001067)
- Added to NRHP: September 28, 2001

The Capitol Theater was located at 542 State Street in Salem, Oregon, United States. Part of the Bligh Building, it was built in the 1920s for vaudeville. During its heyday, it housed a Wurlitzer pipe organ, which is now in private ownership in Washington. The theater was demolished in 2000, but the retail portion of the building, now known as the Pacific Building, still stands.

== Bligh Building and Capitol Theater ==
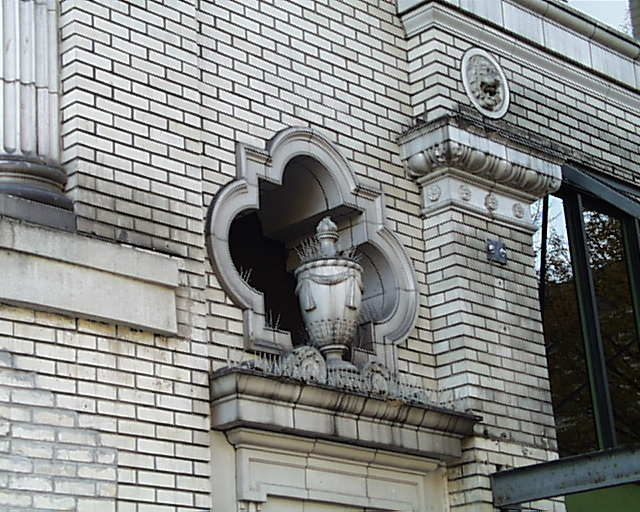
Terra cotta facade detail is all that remains of the theater portion of the building

The building, constructed in 1926 for owner Frank D. Bligh, covered a quarter of a block. At the time it was built, it had twelve storefronts and thirty-five rooms designed for offices, as well as what was known at the time as the New Bligh Capitol Theater, with 1,200 seats. Bligh owned several theaters in Salem, including the original Bligh Theater built in 1912 and closed in 1927. For a time Bligh owned the Klinger Grand Theater, which he also renamed Bligh Theater. The Capitol Theater's brightly lit marquee was constructed of stained glass in the shape of the dome of the second Oregon State Capitol building, which was destroyed in a 1935 fire.

== Decline and demolition ==
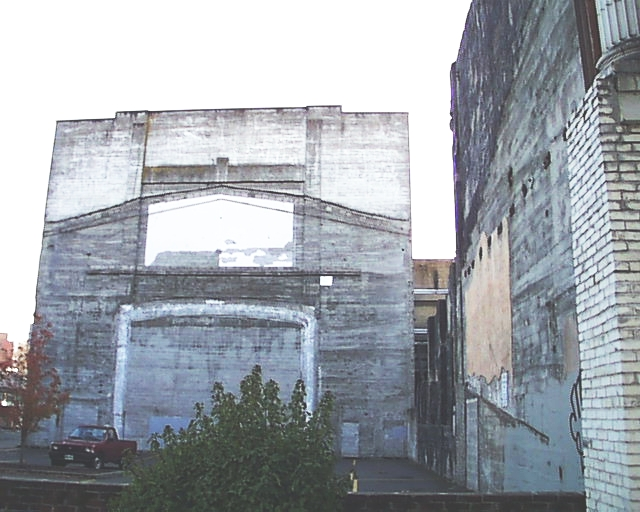
The theater's stage house abutted the Elsinore Theatre's stage house and the bricked-in proscenium arch can still be seen

The theater converted from vaudeville to movies. By 1952 the glass dome marquee had been replaced. By the 1980s, it was one of only two pre-World War II theaters left in downtown Salem, which had once hosted as many as eight. Like its neighbor, the Elsinore Theatre, the Capitol declined to a second-run movie house. It was closed in 1990.

The Capitol Theater was demolished in May/June 2000 because of structural decay. The location is now a parking lot, however, the adjoining office and retail space remains. This retail building, known as the Bligh Building and currently as the Pacific Building, is a contributing property of the Salem Downtown State Street-Commercial Street Historic District, which is listed on the National Register of Historic Places.

== Theater organ ==
The theater's 3/8 (3-manual/8-rank) "Mighty Wurlitzer" theatre organ was installed in 1926. In 1941, the organ was moved to Seattle's Civic Ice Arena. In 1964–65, the organ was moved to the Seattle Center Food Circus. It was sold at auction in 1976, and is currently installed in a private home in Washington, combined with parts from Portland's Majestic/United Artists Theatre organ to make a 3/18 Wurlitzer.
