= Cavitt =

Cavitt may refer to:

== Places ==
- Cavitt Creek
- Cavitt Creek Bridge
- Cavitt Creek Falls
- Cavitt's Creek at Lake Witten

== People ==
- Brandon Cavitt, American soccer player
- Cam Cavitt, American politician

== See also ==
- Cavit, a masculine given name
