= Little River (North Umpqua River tributary) =

- Location of the mouth of Little River in Oregon
- Etymology: Little River in Tennessee, probably

Location
- Country: United States
- State: Oregon
- County: Douglas

Physical characteristics
- Source: near Quartz Mountain
  - location: Umpqua National Forest, Cascade Range
  - coordinates: 43°11′07″N 122°40′59″W
  - elevation: 4,482 ft (1,366 m)
- Mouth: North Umpqua River
  - location: near Glide
  - coordinates: 43°17′51″N 123°06′06″W
  - elevation: 676 ft (206 m)
- Length: 30 mi (48 km)
- Basin size: 206 sq mi (530 km^{2})

The Little River is a tributary of the North Umpqua River, about 30 miles (48 km) long, in southwestern Oregon in the United States. It drains part of the western side of the Cascade Range east of Roseburg, between the North and South Umpqua.

Little River rises north of Quartz Mountain in eastern Douglas County in the Umpqua National Forest. It flows west-northwest and joins the North Umpqua from the south at Glide, approximately 12 miles (19 km) east-northeast of Roseburg. The confluence is known as Colliding Rivers because of the nearly head-on angle at which the streams meet.

The current Colliding Rivers Information Center was originally the North Umpqua Ranger Station of the Umpqua National Forest. It was built in 1938 by the Civilian Conservation Corps and United States Forest Service (USFS). It was converted to a residence in the 1950s, but in 1990 the building began to be restored to be similar to the original condition for use as an information center. Opened in 1992, the visitor center is managed jointly by the Forest Service, the Roseburg Visitor and Convention Bureau and the Bureau of Land Management. It is listed on the National Register of Historic Places.

== Name ==
An early name for the river was the East Umpqua. In 1855, a pioneer settler, Meshek Tipton, filed a donation land claim near the confluence of the East Umpqua and North Umpqua rivers. Tipton had lived near the Little River in Tennessee before emigrating to Oregon. It is thought that Tipton changed the East Umpqua's name to Little River in memory of his birthplace.

== Course ==
Little River begins north of Quartz Mountain and east of Hemlock Lake in the Umpqua National Forest of southwestern Oregon. Flowing north for about 3 miles (5 km), it turns west before plunging over Yakso Falls. Beyond the falls, it receives Hemlock Creek from the left and then Junction and Pinnacle creeks from the right. Cedar Creek enters from the right about 24 miles (39 km) from the mouth. Over the next 4 miles (6 km), Taft Creek enters from the right and then Clover and Black creeks from the left.

Downstream of Black Creek, the Little River turns northwest and receives Little Taft and Poore creeks from the right and White Creek from the left. White Creek Campground is on the left at the mouth of White Creek. Below this, Negro Creek enters from the left, and Cool Water Campground is on the right at river mile (RM) 17. About 2 miles (3 km) later, the river arrives at Emile Creek Campground. Over the next stretch, Little River receives Emile and Shivigny creeks from the right before passing by Wolf Creek Campground. The river then receives Little Creek from the right, Wolf Creek from the left, and Greenman Creek from the right.

Boundary Creek enters from the right at about RM 9. Slightly more than a mile later, Bond Creek enters from the right, then Cavitt Creek and Jim Creek from the left at RM 7. At this point, Cavitt Creek Falls and Cavitt Creek County Park is on the left, and the river passes under Cavitt Creek Bridge, a covered bridge. Further downstream, the river turns north and over the next 2 miles (3 km) receives Eagles Creek and Rattlesnake Creek, both from the right. Turning west again, the river receives Williams Creek from the right and Fall and Buckhorn creeks from the left before heading north and northwest for the final 1 mile (2 km). Little River passes under Oregon Route 138 and meets the North Umpqua River near Glide, 29 miles (47 km) from the larger stream's confluence with the South Umpqua River.

For much of its length, Little River is paralleled by Forest Road 27, which is gravel along the upstream stretches but becomes paved for the lowermost 2 miles (3 km). Below that, it is known as County Road 17 (Little River Road), a paved highway that follows the river all the way to Route 138 and the river mouth.

== Watershed ==
The heavily forested Little River watershed, which extends from the western Cascades to the Umpqua Valley hills, includes a variety of conifers, hardwoods, and prairie vegetation. As of 2006, 63 percent of the land was publicly owned, and 37 percent was private. The U.S. Forest Service administered about 99 square miles (260 km^{2}) of the public land and the Bureau of Land Management about 31 square miles (80 km^{2}). Roughly 97 percent of the land, public and private, was devoted to forestry.

Homes and ranches are located mainly near the lower river and along Cavitt Creek. There are no large population centers in the watershed; most of the unincorporated community of Glide lies outside the basin. It is estimated that in 2000 only 1,200 people lived in the watershed.

Sea-going fish species in the watershed include chinook and coho salmon, steelhead, Pacific lamprey, and coastal cutthroat trout. Non-seagoing species include resident rainbow, brook, and cutthroat trout as well as kokanee. Little River and Cavett Creek provide good spawning habitat for coho salmon and other migrating species.

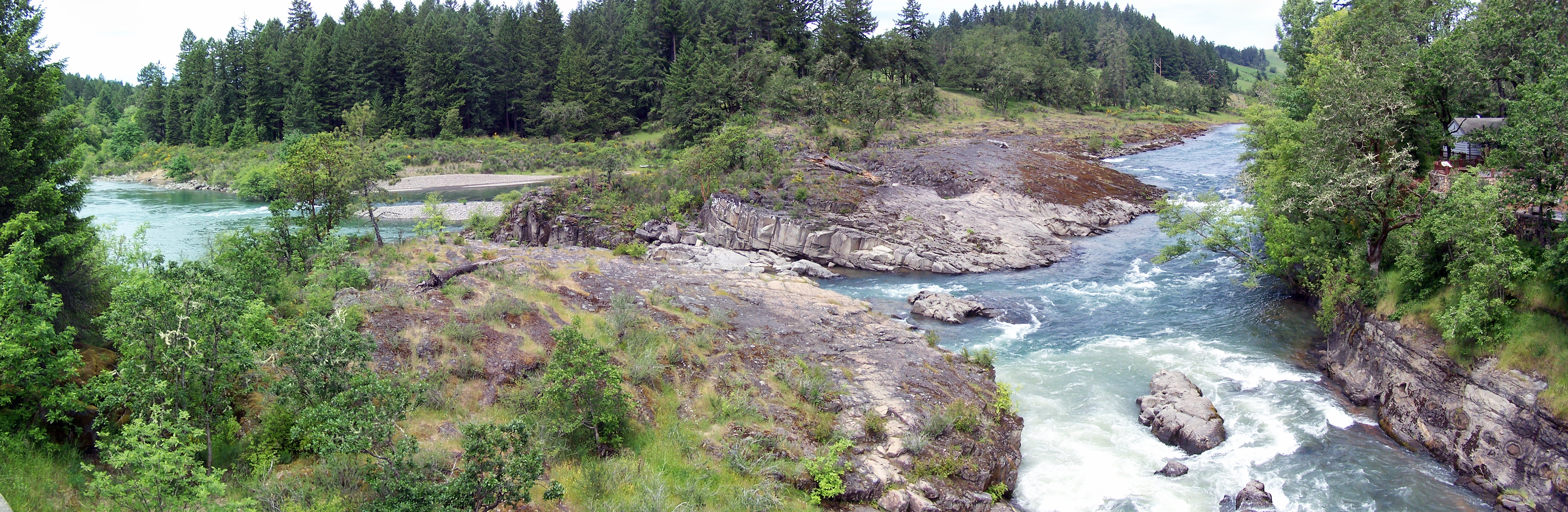
Panorama of the Colliding Rivers

== See also ==
- List of Oregon rivers
