= Cavet =

Cavet is a surname. Notable people with the surname include:

- Benjamin Cavet (born 1994), English-born French skier
- Tillar H. Cavet (1889–1966), American baseball player

== See also ==
- Avet
- Cavett
- Cavit
