= Peel, Oregon =

Unincorporated community in the state of Oregon, United States

Coordinates: 43.258729°N 123.033116°W

Peel is an unincorporated community in Douglas County, Oregon, United States. It is located about six miles southeast of Glide near the Little River.

Peel post office was established in 1888 and named for congressman Samuel W. Peel of Arkansas. Peel is one of the few places in the American West named for a Confederate soldier. In 1915 Peel had a public school and a daily stagecoach to Roseburg. The post office closed in 1921. The 1943 Cavitt Creek Bridge, a covered bridge, is about a mile south of the community.
