= Great Britain Diving Federation =

The Great Britain Diving Federation (GBDF) is the English, Welsh and Scottish amateur sports body for competitive diving, an Olympic sport, in collaboration with British Swimming. The term diving often refers to underwater diving, such as scuba diving. The GBDF represents diving from a springboard and highboard.

== History ==
It was formed in 1992 to differentiate the sport from other techniques of competitive swimming, governed by the Amateur Swimming Association (ASA). The GBDF did not have anything like the resources that the ASA, now British Swimming, did.

Divers in UK have had difficulty to train in the past twenty years, and as there are fewer diving pools to train at. In 1977 there were 296 springboard and highboard facilities in Britain; by 2011 there were less than 100. Wales has one highboard facility. There are none in Birmingham, Norfolk and Suffolk. In 1977, London had 96 diving polls, and by 2011 it had 14. The University of Nottingham Students' Union (UoNSU) has the only university diving (acrobatics) club in the UK.

=== Competitions ===
From 2017 to 2020, UK Sport is funding £8.8m to UK diving. British Swimming has taken over most of diving training for UK competitors in the Olympics.

== Function ==
In addition to British Swimming, the GBDF contributes to diving training in the UK. It holds national diving competitions each year; this has been held at the Royal Commonwealth Pool in Edinburgh.

== See also ==
- British Sub-Aqua Club (BSAC), for recreational diving, headquartered in Cheshire
- LEN, the Ligue Européenne de Natation or European Swimming League
- Swim Ireland, represents diving in Northern Ireland
