= Cavitt Creek =

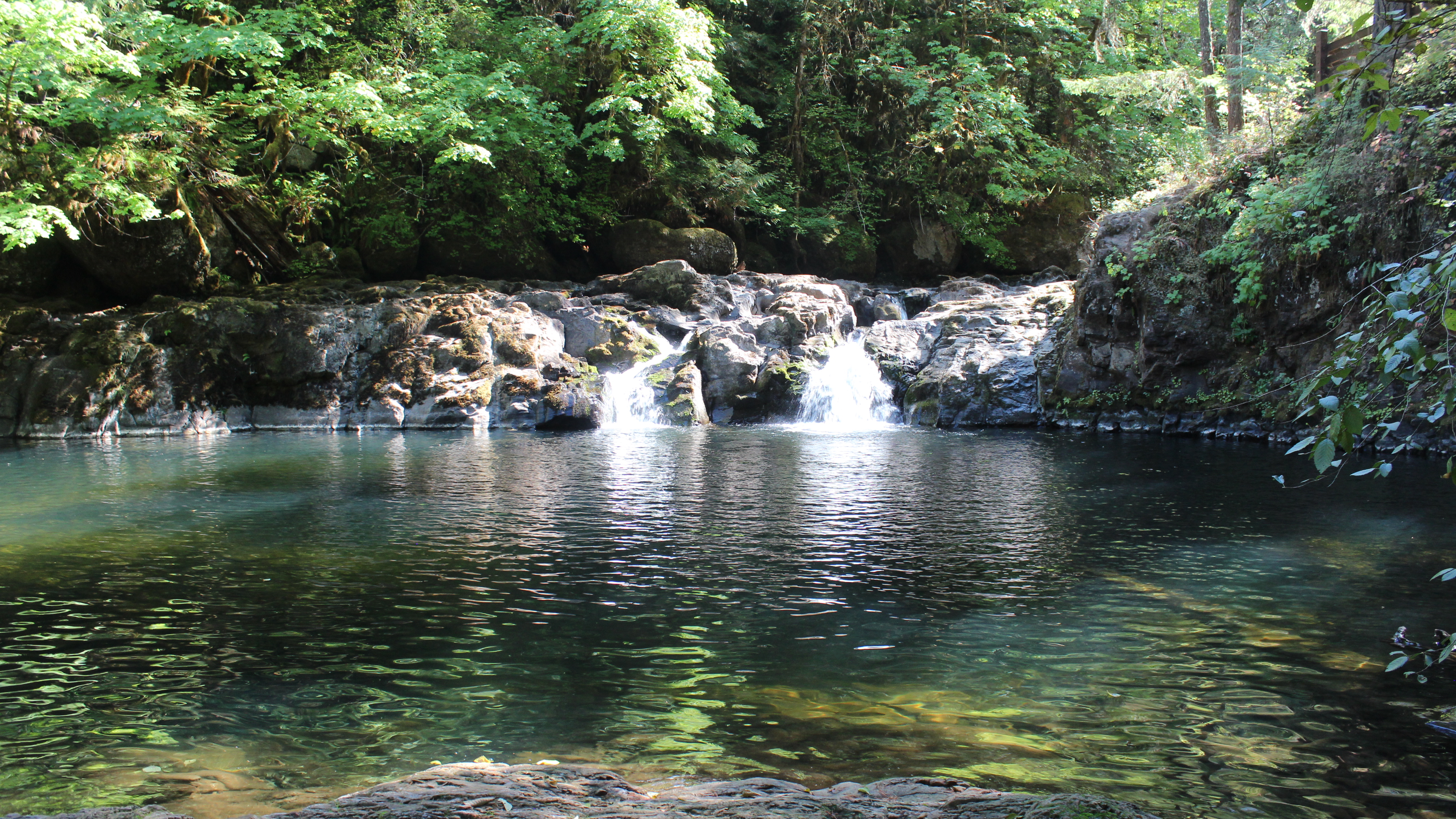
- Cavitt Creek Falls

- Location of the mouth of Cavitt Creek in Oregon
- Etymology: For Robert L. Cavitt, who settled along the creek in the mid-19th century

Location
- Country: United States
- State: Oregon
- Region: Umpqua National Forest
- County: Douglas

Physical characteristics
- Source: Cascade Range
  - location: near Red Butte
  - coordinates: 43°08′43″N 122°52′18″W
  - elevation: 4,019 ft (1,225 m)
- Mouth: Little River
  - location: near Peel
  - coordinates: 43°14′27″N 123°01′14″W
  - elevation: 889 ft (271 m)

Cavitt Creek is a tributary of the Little River in Douglas County in the U.S. state of Oregon. From its source near Red Butte, the creek flows generally west then north through the Umpqua National Forest of the Cascade Range before entering the river about 1.5 miles (2.4 km) upstream of the rural community of Peel and 7 miles (11 km) above the Little River's mouth on the North Umpqua River.

Cavitt Creek Falls Recreation Site is about 3 miles (5 km) upstream of the confluence along Cavitt Creek Road. Managed by the Bureau of Land Management, the forested site features 6-foot (1.8 m) Cavitt Creek waterfall above a swimming hole. Amenities include campsites, water spigots, parking, and restrooms, as well as proximity to fishing spots and hiking trails. The park is open from May 22 to September 26.

== Bridge ==
Cavitt Creek Bridge carries Cavitt Creek Road over the Little River downstream of the confluence of the creek and the river. The road crosses Jim Creek, another Little River tributary, before reaching the bridge.

== Tributaries ==
Named tributaries of Cavitt Creek from source to mouth are Withrow, Cultus, Liveoak, Tuttle, and Springer creeks. Further downstream come Mill, White Rock, Copperhead, Buck Peak, Buckshot, McKay, and Evans creeks.

== See also ==
- List of rivers of Oregon
