= Glide Ranger Station =

- U.S. National Register of Historic Places
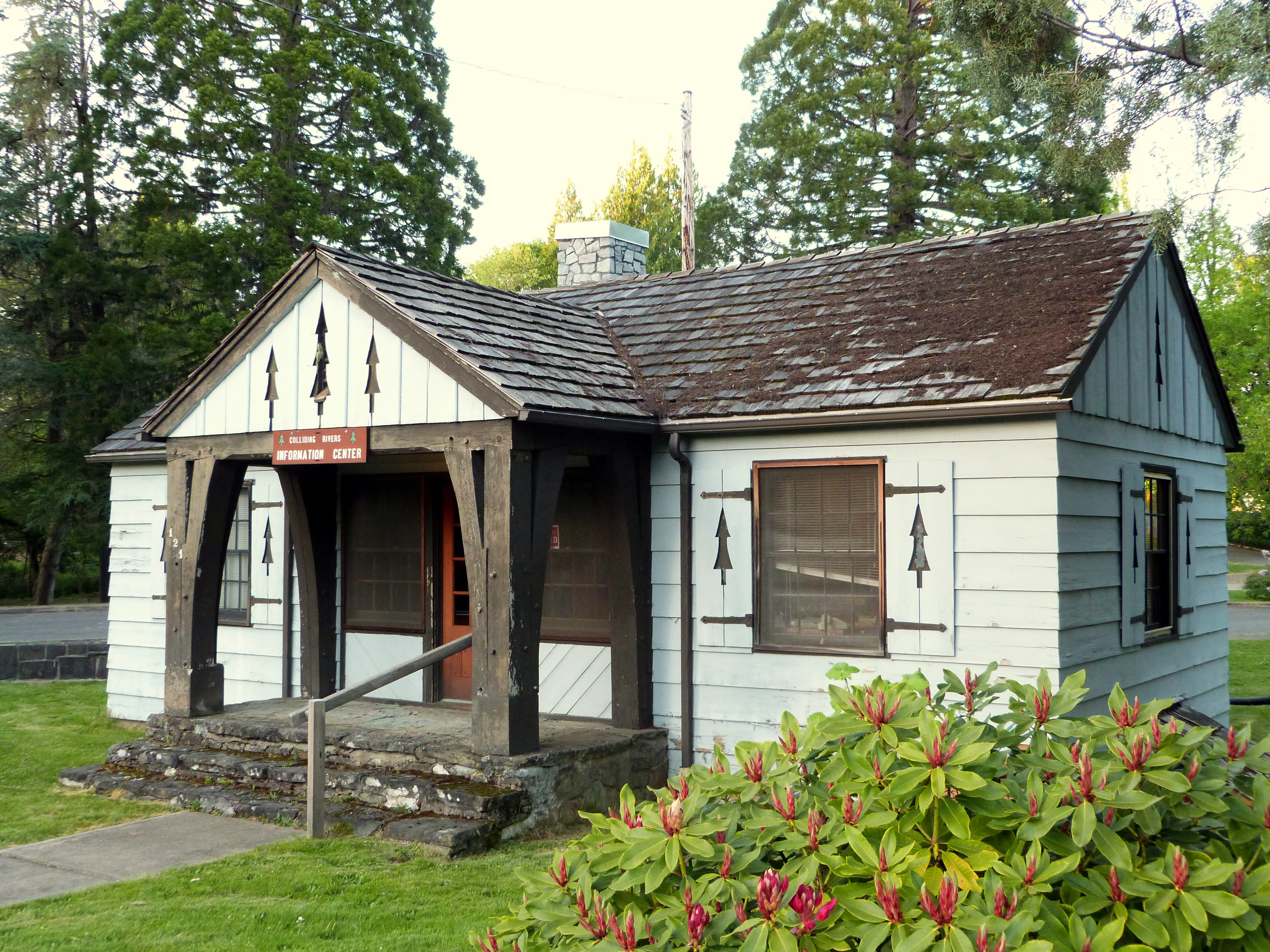
- The Glide Ranger Station in 2013.
- Location: 121 Glide Loop Drive; Glide, Oregon
- Coordinates: 43°17′52″N 123°06′02″W
- Area: 0.1 acres (0.040 ha)
- Built: 1938
- Architect: USDA Forest Service Architecture Group
- Architectural style: Rustic
- MPS: Depression-Era Buildings TR
- NRHP reference No.: 86000820
- Added to NRHP: April 08, 1986

The Glide Ranger Station in Umpqua National Forest near Glide, Oregon, United States, was built in 1938 by the Civilian Conservation Corps. The former ranger station was listed on the National Register of Historic Places in 1986 for its Rustic architecture.

In 1986, the station building was in excellent condition. It is a one-story wood-frame building on a concrete foundation, with gables, timbers, and stone steps. Decorative features include pine tree-shaped cutouts in shutters and pine tree designs centered in each gable end.

It currently serves as the Colliding Rivers Visitor Center.

== See also ==
- Colliding Rivers
