= Cavitt Creek Bridge =

Covered bridge in Oregon, US

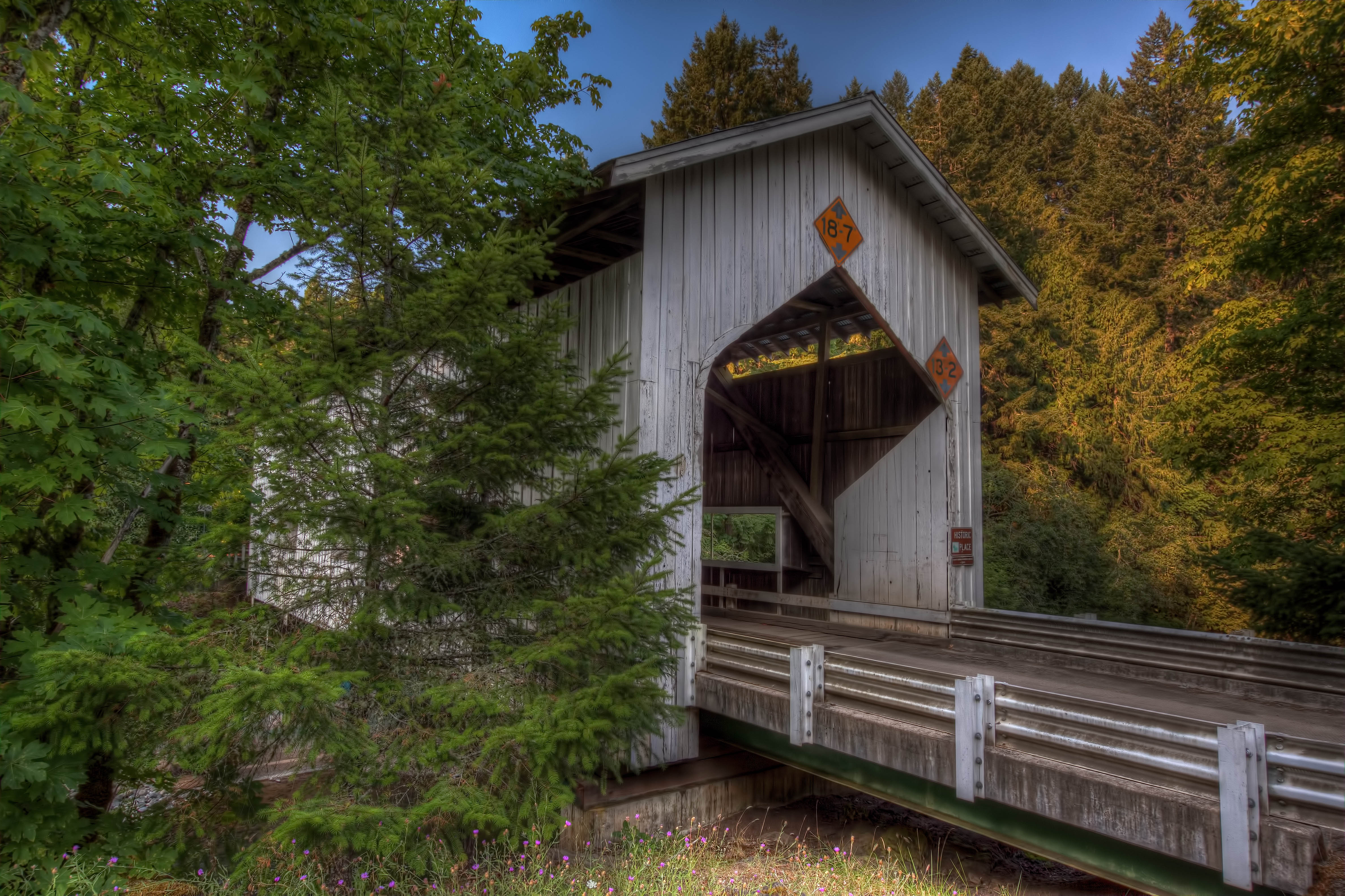
- Cavitt Creek Bridge over the Little River
- Coordinates: 43°14′38.8″N 123°01′19.2″W
- Carries: Cavitt Creek Road
- Crosses: Little River
- Locale: Douglas County, Oregon, United States
- Other name: Little River Covered Bridge
- Maintained by: Douglas County

Characteristics
- Design: Covered Howe truss
- Total length: 70 feet (21 m)

History
- Constructed by: Floyd C. Frear
- Opened: 1943

Location
- Interactive map of Cavitt Creek Bridge

Cavitt Creek Bridge is a covered bridge in Douglas County in the U.S. state of Oregon. Built by Floyd C. Frear in 1943, it carries Cavitt Creek Road over the Little River about 20 miles (32 km) east of Roseburg. Cavitt Creek and the road and bridge were named for Robert L. Cavitt, who settled along the creek in the mid-19th century.

Cavitt Creek, a tributary of the Little River, enters the river upstream of the bridge. Cavitt Creek Road, after crossing Jim Creek, another Little River tributary, intersects Little River Road at the north end of the bridge. The bridge is a little more than a mile upstream of the small community of Peel and 7 miles (11 km) upstream of the Little River's confluence with the North Umpqua River near Glide.

== Notable Features ==
- Tudor portal arches allow room for log trucks, unhewn timbers for truss chords, three windows on each side, a metal roof, and long narrow slits above each truss for better lighting and ventilation.
- The bridge was part of a thematic nomination of Oregon's covered bridges in 1979, but Douglas County blocked the listing.

== See also ==
- List of Oregon covered bridges
