= Colliding Rivers =

Historic site in Oregon, US

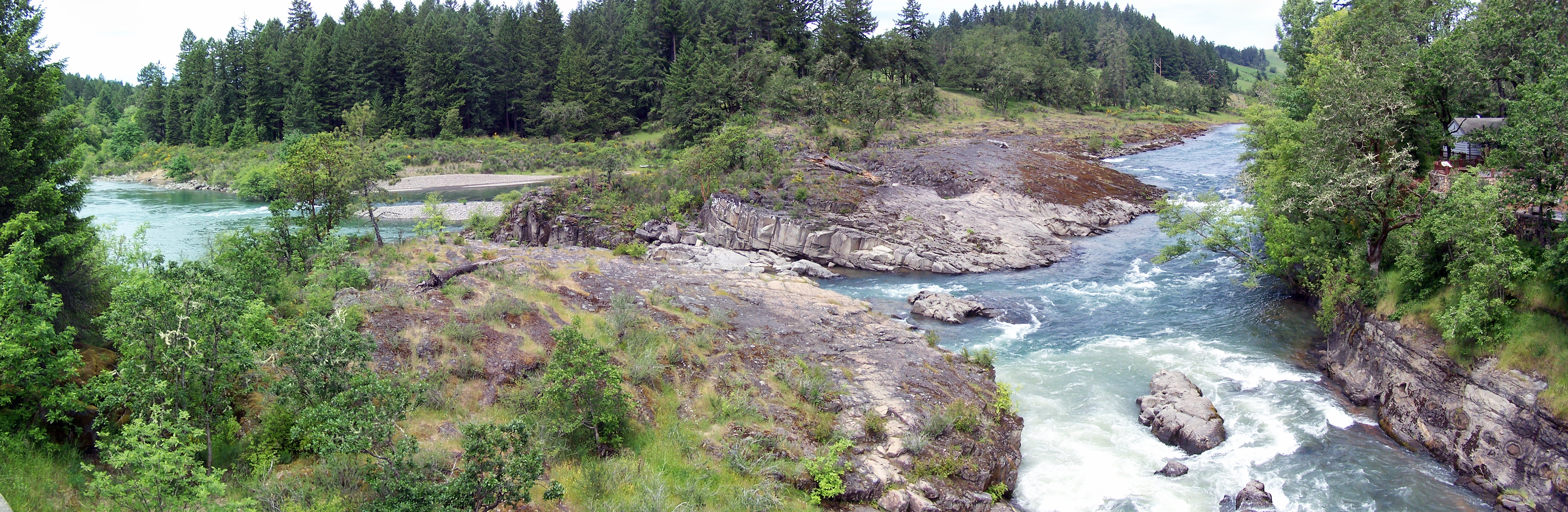
- Point where the North Umpqua River (above) meets the Little River (bottom)

- Location within the United States
- 43°17′52″N 123°06′08″W
- Location: Glide, Oregon, USA

Site notes
- Area: 7 ha (17 acres)

The Colliding Rivers is the name of the confluence of Little River into the North Umpqua River at Glide, Oregon, approximately 12 miles (19 km) east-northeast of Roseburg. It is known as Colliding Rivers because of the nearly head-on angle at which the streams meet, the only place in the state of Oregon where a river meets its tributary in such a straight angle. Prior to the point of the Colliding Rivers, the Little River approaches from the south and the North Umpqua has completed a sharp bend and intersects the Little River.

== Location ==
The Colliding Rivers is on the west side of the town of Glide, which is accessed off Oregon Route 138. Interstate 5 connects to Route 138 from the West and U.S. Route 97 from the East.

Route 138 has a rest area and viewpoint adjacent to the Colliding Rivers Visitor Center that includes a comfort station, plus several interpretive panels about the area and its natural phenomenon.

== Whitewaters ==
The Colliding Rivers area is a constricted spot of the two rivers because of several large rock formations. Within a 5-mile radius surrounding the Colliding Rivers point there are many straight river routes leading to several class 2 and 2+ pool drop rapids with frequent 2–3 feet standing waves.
