= Cavit =

Cavit is a Turkish masculine given name of Persian origin. Notable people with the name include:

- Cavit Acar (born 2000), Turkish freestyle wrestler
- Cavit Cav (1905–1982), Turkish Olympian cyclist
- Cavit Erdel (1884–1933), military officer of the Ottoman Army and Turkish Army general
- Cavit Orhan Tütengil (1921–1979), Turkish sociologist, writer and columnist
- Mehmet Cavit Bey (1875–1926), Ottoman Sabbatean economist, newspaper editor and leading politician
- Onur Cavit Biriz (born 2001), Turkish windsurfer

== See also ==
- Cavitt (disambiguation)
