= Cavitt Creek Falls =

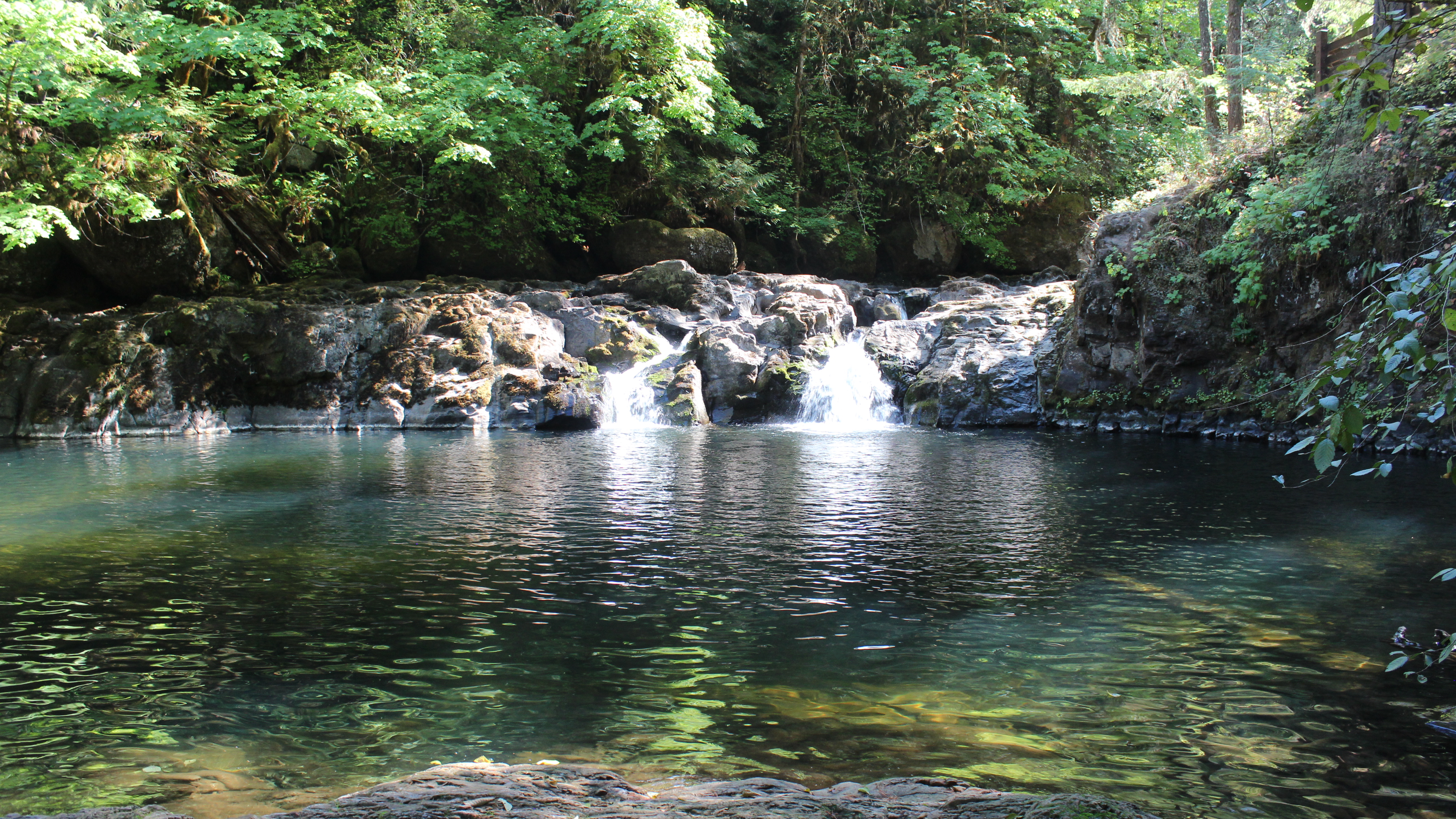
- Interactive map of Cavitt Creek Falls
- Location: Cavitt Creek
- Coordinates: 43.19978°N 123.02177°W
- Type: Cascade
- Elevation: 1,051 ft (320 m)
- Total height: 8 ft (2.4 m)
- Average flow rate: 100 cu ft/s (2.8 m^{3}/s)

Cavitt Creek Falls, is a waterfall located on the west edge of the Umpqua National Forest, outside of the town of Glide, in Douglas County, in the U.S. state of Oregon. It totals 8 feet fall in one cascade that shoots into a large swimming bowl and is the centerpiece attraction of the Cavitt Creek Falls trailhead and Recreation Site. Boulders across Cavitt Creek create two channels of water flow that make the cascade and add to a combined width of approximately 15 feet.

Cavitt Creek Falls is located along Little River Road, approximately 7 miles from Highway 138. The cascade is surrounded by forest. The river is open to trout fishing with artificial flies and lures only.

== See also ==
- List of waterfalls in Oregon
