= Quartz Mountain (Douglas County, Oregon) =

Mountain in Douglas County, Oregon, United States

- Location within Oregon

Highest point
- Elevation: 5524+ ft (1683+ m) NAVD 88
- Prominence: 800 ft (244 m)
- Coordinates: 43°09′50″N 122°40′20″W

Geography
- Location: Douglas County, Oregon, U.S.
- Parent range: Cascades
- Topo map: USGS Quartz Mountain

Quartz Mountain is a located 35 miles (56 km) east of Roseburg in Douglas County, Oregon, United States. Located within the Jackson Creek subbasin, a tributary of the South Umpqua River, Quartz Mountain rises to an elevation of 5,200 feet (1,585 m) in the Umpqua National Forest. It has a large deposit of high-purity silica.

The summit was the site of a Forest Service lookout tower until it was removed in 1970.

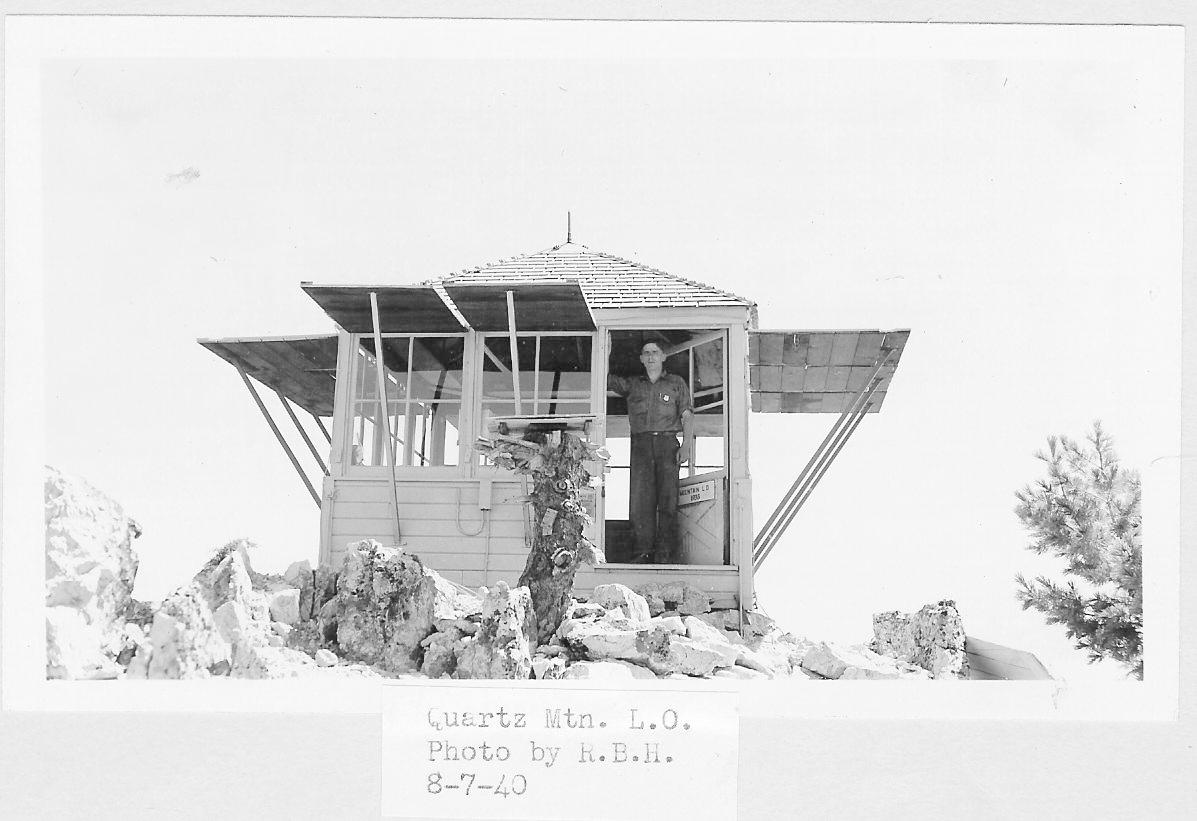
Quartz Mountain L-5 cab erected in 1933
