= Avet =

Avet (Armenian: Ավետ) is an Armenian male given name. Notable people with this name include:

- Avet Avetisyan (1897–1971), Armenian actor
- Avet Barseghyan, Armenian songwriter and TV host
- Avet Ter-Gabrielyan (1899–1983), Armenian violinist and the founder of the Komitas Quartet
- Avet Terterian (1929–1994), Armenian composer

== See also ==
- Flaminio Avet, French-born Italian World War I flying ace
