= Glide, Oregon =

- Census-designated place (CDP)
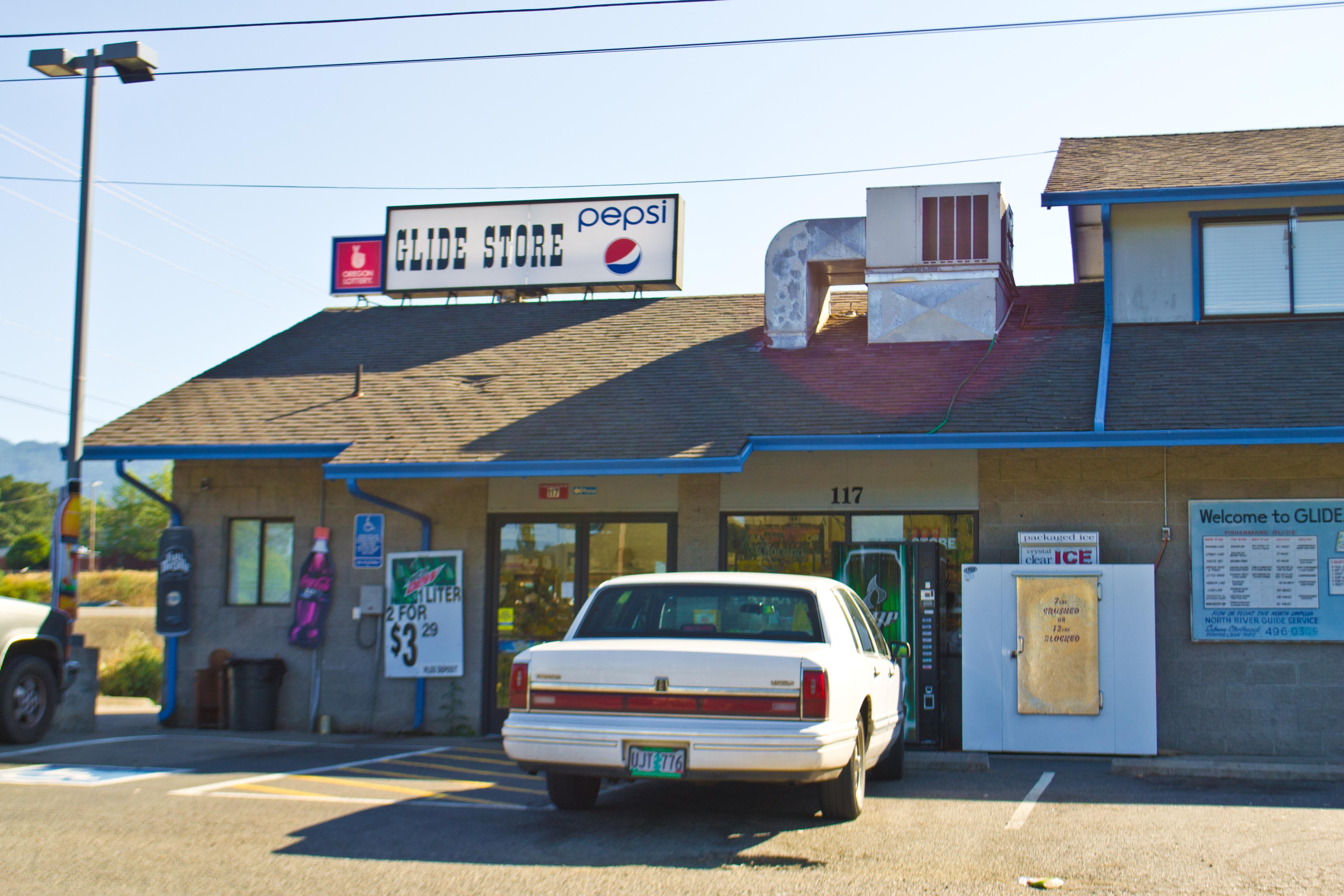

- Location of Glide, Oregon
- Coordinates: 43°17′40″N 123°05′25″W
- Country: United States
- State: Oregon
- County: Douglas

Area
  - Total: 10.16 sq mi (26.31 km^{2})
  - Land: 10.08 sq mi (26.11 km^{2})
  - Water: 0.077 sq mi (0.20 km^{2})
- Elevation: 1,266 ft (386 m)

Population (2020)
  - Total: 1,805
  - Density: 179.0/sq mi (69.12/km^{2})
- Time zone: UTC-8 (Pacific (PST))
  - Summer (DST): UTC-7 (PDT)
- ZIP code: 97443
- Area code: 541
- FIPS code: 41-29750
- GNIS feature ID: 2408301

Glide is a census-designated place (CDP) in Douglas County, Oregon, United States. As of the 2020 census, Glide had a population of 1,805.

== Geography ==
According to the United States Census Bureau, the CDP has a total area of 10.2 square miles (26 km^{2}), of which 10.1 square miles (26 km^{2}) is land and 0.1 square miles (0.26 km^{2}), or 0.59%, is water.

=== Climate ===
Climate data for Glide, Oregon
Month	Jan	Feb	Mar	Apr	May	Jun	Jul	Aug	Sep	Oct	Nov	Dec	Year
Record high °F (°C)	70 (21)	77 (25)	80 (27)	90 (32)	97 (36)	101 (38)	103 (39)	104 (40)	102 (39)	96 (36)	76 (24)	66 (19)	104 (40)
Mean daily maximum °F (°C)	46 (8)	52 (11)	57 (14)	63 (17)	70 (21)	75 (24)	84 (29)	84 (29)	78 (26)	64 (18)	51 (11)	44 (7)	64 (18)
Mean daily minimum °F (°C)	34 (1)	34 (1)	36 (2)	38 (3)	43 (6)	47 (8)	50 (10)	49 (9)	45 (7)	41 (5)	37 (3)	33 (1)	41 (5)
Record low °F (°C)	2 (−17)	6 (−14)	16 (−9)	24 (−4)	26 (−3)	31 (−1)	34 (1)	32 (0)	26 (−3)	19 (−7)	13 (−11)	−1 (−18)	−1 (−18)
Average precipitation inches (mm)	8.72 (221)	6.74 (171)	6.62 (168)	5.40 (137)	3.71 (94)	1.96 (50)	0.70 (18)	0.72 (18)	1.77 (45)	4.63 (118)	10.01 (254)	10.90 (277)	61.88 (1,571)

== Demographics ==
Historical population
Census	Pop.	Note	%±
2000	1,690		—
2010	1,795		6.2%
2020	1,805		0.6%
U.S. Decennial Census

As of the census of 2000, there were 1,690 people, 624 households, and 484 families in the CDP. The population density was 167.3 inhabitants per square mile (64.6/km^{2}). There were 675 housing units at an average density of 66.8 per square mile (25.8/km^{2}). The racial makeup of the CDP was 99.99% White, and 0.01% other.

Of the 624 households 36.1% had children under the age of 18 living with them, 65.9% were married couples living together, 7.4% had a female householder with no husband present, and 22.4% were non-families. 18.1% of households were one person and 6.9% were one person aged 65 or older. The average household size was 2.71 and the average family size was 3.06.

The age distribution was 28.6% under the age of 18, 6.2% from 18 to 24, 25.4% from 25 to 44, 27.7% from 45 to 64, and 12.2% 65 or older. The median age was 39 years. For every 100 females, there were 104.1 males. For every 100 females age 18 and over, there were 100.5 males.

The median household income was $40,345 and the median family income was $45,313. Males had a median income of $37,857 versus $21,591 for females. The per capita income for the CDP was $18,444. About 9.4% of families and 8.0% of the population were below the poverty line, including 13.2% of those under age 18 and 8.0% of those age 65 or over.

== Point of interest ==
- Colliding Rivers: the North Umpqua River and the Little River meet head-on, the only place in the world where this happens.

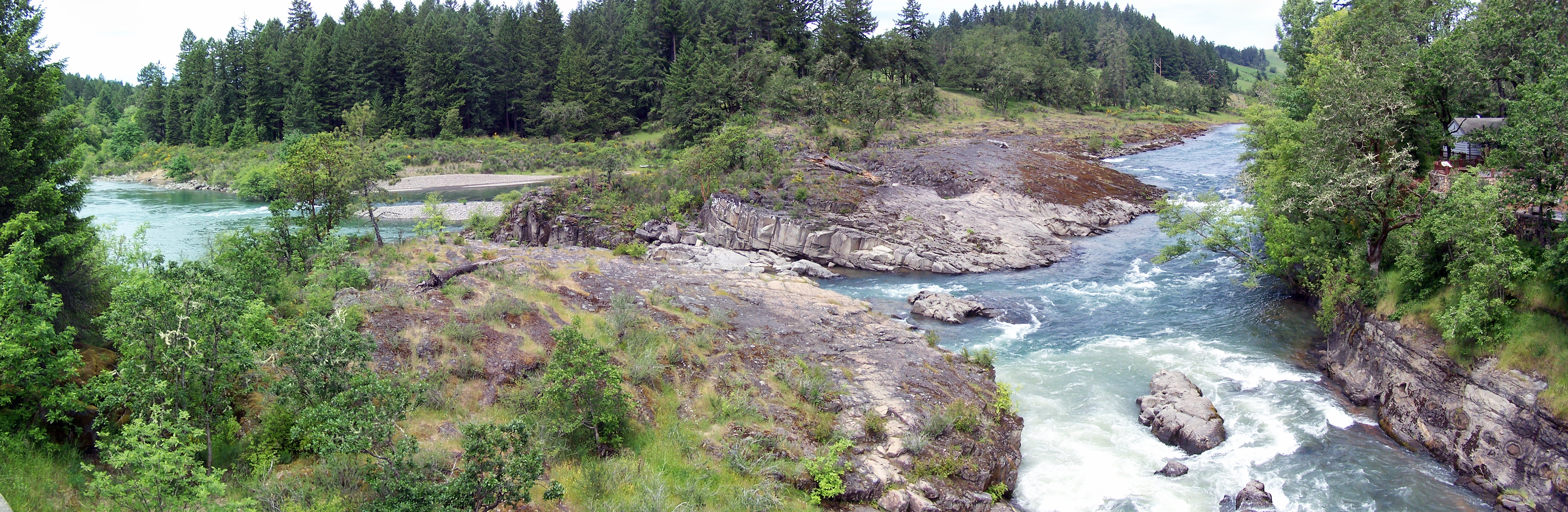
Panorama of the Colliding Rivers

== See also ==
- Glide High School
