= Horse Creek (McKenzie River tributary) =

River on the Columbian Plateau in western Oregon, US

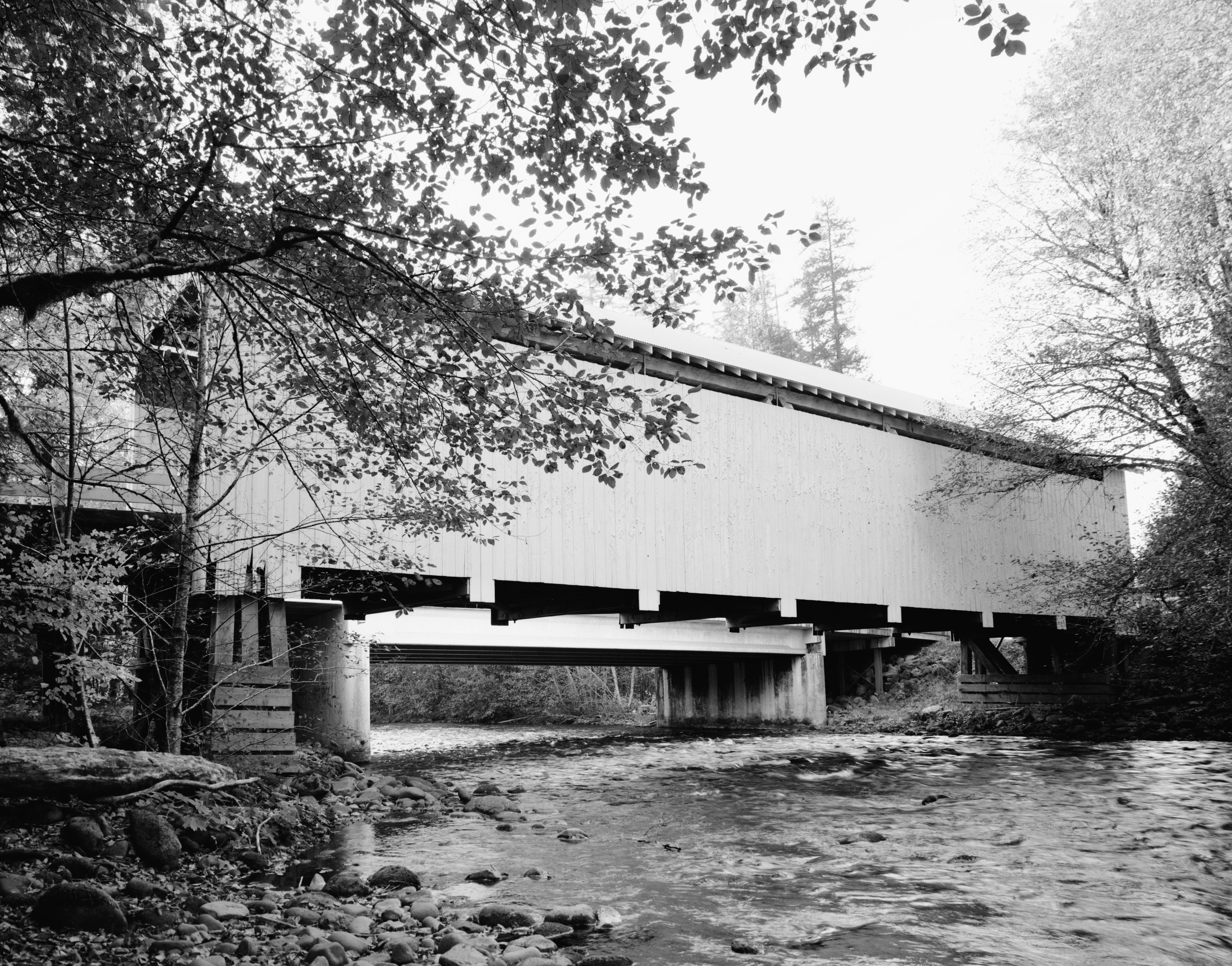
- Horse Creek Bridge formerly spanned Horse Creek.

- Location of the mouth of Horse Creek in Oregon
- Etymology: For a team of horses lost along the creek by 19th-century emigrants

Location
- Country: United States
- State: Oregon
- County: Lane

Physical characteristics
- Source: Cascade Range
  - coordinates: 43°58′43″N 121°51′10″W
  - elevation: 5,401 ft (1,646 m)
- Mouth: McKenzie River
  - coordinates: 44°10′12″N 122°10′29″W
  - elevation: 1,352 ft (412 m)

Horse Creek is a tributary of the McKenzie River in near the unincorporated community of McKenzie Bridge in Lane County in the U.S. state of Oregon. It begins in the Cascade Range in the Three Sisters Wilderness of the Willamette National Forest. Its headwaters are near the Deschutes County border and the Pacific Crest Trail. It flows generally northwest to meet the river about 65 miles (105 km) upstream of the McKenzie's confluence with the Willamette River.

The creek flows through a series of lakes—Sunset, Horse, Middle Horse, and Lower Horse—in its upper reaches, then passes through Cedar Swamp. Named tributaries from source to mouth are Eugene, Mosquito, Pothole, Roney, Castle, Separation, Halfinger, and Spring creeks. Below that come Avenue, Cedar Swamp, Wilelada, Owl, and King creeks.

Horse Creek branches into distributaries as it nears the river. The named ones are East Fork Horse Creek and West Fork Horse Creek. Two additional named tributaries, Taylor and Drury creeks, enter the West Fork before it meets the river.

Horse Creek Campground along the creek's lower reaches has room for up to 60 campers and 23 vehicles. Amenities include drinking water, picnic tables, toilets, and campfire rings. The campground is open from early May to late October.

== Covered bridge ==
The Horse Creek Bridge was a covered bridge spanning Horse Creek near McKenzie Bridge. Built in 1937, it was dismantled in 1987, and its timbers were used in two other covered bridges, one in Cottage Grove and the other in Myrtle Creek.

== See also ==
- List of rivers of Oregon
