= NASA spin-off technologies =

Technologies developed by NASA that were later used in everyday life on Earth.

NASA spin-off technologies are commercial products and services which have been developed with the help of NASA, through research and development contracts, such as Small Business Innovation Research (SBIR) or STTR awards, licensing of NASA patents, use of NASA facilities, technical assistance from NASA personnel, or data from NASA research. Information on new NASA technology that may be useful to industry is available in periodical and website form in "NASA Tech Briefs", while successful examples of commercialization are reported annually in the NASA publication Spinoffs. The publication has documented more than 2,000 technologies over time.

In 1979, notable science fiction author Robert A. Heinlein helped bring awareness to the spin-offs when he was asked to appear before Congress after recovering from one of the earliest known vascular bypass operations to correct a blocked artery. In his testimony, reprinted in his 1980 book Expanded Universe, Heinlein claimed that four NASA spin-off technologies made the surgery possible, and that they were only a few from a long list of NASA spin-off technologies from space development.

Since 1976, the NASA Technology Transfer Program has connected NASA resources to private industry, referring to the commercial products as spin-offs. Well-known products that NASA claims as spin-offs include memory foam (originally named temper foam), freeze-dried food, firefighting equipment, emergency "space blankets", DustBusters, cochlear implants, LZR Racer swimsuits, and CMOS image sensors. As of 2016, NASA has published over 2,000 other spin-offs in the fields of computer technology, environment and agriculture, health and medicine, public safety, transportation, recreation, and industrial productivity. Contrary to common belief, NASA did not invent Tang, Velcro or Teflon.

== History of the Spin-off publication ==
NASA. Spinoff 1976. A Bicentennial Report. 1977

NASA. Spinoff 1998, publication

NASA. Spinoff 2007. publication

Spinoff is a NASA publication featuring technology made available to the public. Since 1976, NASA has featured an average of 50 technologies each year in the annual publication, and Spinoff maintains a searchable database of these technologies. When products first spun off from space research, NASA presented a black and white report in 1973, titled the "Technology Utilization Program Report".

Because of interest in the reports, NASA decided to create the annual publications in color. Spinoff was first published in 1976, and since then, NASA has distributed free copies to universities, the media, inventors and the general public. Spinoff describes how NASA works with various industries and small businesses to bring new technology to the public. As of 2016, there were over 1,920 Spinoff products in the database dating back to 1976.

== Health and medicine ==
=== Infrared ear thermometers ===
Diatek Corporation and NASA developed an aural thermometer that measures the thermal radiation emitted by the eardrum, similar to the way the temperature of stars and planets are measured. This method avoids contact with mucous membranes and permits rapid temperature measurement of newborn or incapacitated patients. NASA supported the Diatek Corporation through the Technology Affiliates Program.

=== Ventricular assist device ===
Collaboration between NASA, Dr. Michael DeBakey, Dr. George Noon, and MicroMed Technology Inc. resulted in a heart pump for patients awaiting heart transplants. The MicroMed DeBakey ventricular assist device (VAD) functions as a "bridge to heart transplant" by pumping blood until a donor heart is available. The pump is approximately one-tenth the size of other currently marketed pulsatile VADs. Because of the pump's small size, fewer patients developed device-related infections. It can operate up to 8 hours on batteries, giving patients the mobility to do normal, everyday activities.

=== Lidar eye-tracking in LASIK ===
In the 1980s, NASA developed LADAR (for Laser RADAR, now more commonly called Lidar) technology for autonomous rendezvous and docking of space vehicles to service satellites. LASIK surgeons of the time happened to have a problem: patients make involuntary eye movements as frequently as 100 times per second, so the LASIK machine must follow the eye movement to accurately reshape the cornea, the clear front surface of the eye, using a laser. Existing video trackers were too slow, causing interruptions when tracking is lost. The LADARVision 4000, approved in 1998, automatically tracks eye movements at a rate of 4,000 times per second while reshaping the cornea. Lidar is also used in military and NASA-sponsored research for applications in strategic target tracking and weapons firing control.

=== Cochlear implants ===
NASA engineer Adam Kissiah started working in the mid-1970s on what became the cochlear implant, a surgically implanted device that allows people suffering from certain kinds of hearing loss, and who receive little or no benefit from traditional hearing aids. Inspired by his own hearing problems, Kissiah, an electronics instrumentation engineer at NASA, spent 3 years of lunches and evenings in Kennedy Space Center's technical library, studying how engineering principles could affect the inner ear. In 1977, NASA assisted Kissiah in obtaining a patent for the cochlear implant.

=== Artificial limbs ===
NASA's continued funding, coupled with its collective innovations in robotics and shock-absorption/comfort materials are inspiring and enabling the private sector to create new and better solutions for animal and human prostheses. Advancements such as Environmental Robots Inc.'s development of artificial muscle systems with robotic sensing and actuation capabilities for use in NASA space robotic and extravehicular activities are being adapted in order to create more functionally dynamic artificial limbs.

Additionally, other private-sector adaptations of NASA's memory foam technology have brought about custom-moldable materials offering the natural look and feel of flesh, as well as preventing friction between the skin and the prosthesis, and heat/moisture buildup.

=== Light-emitting diodes in medical therapies ===
After initial experiments using light-emitting diodes in NASA space shuttle plant growth experiments, NASA issued a small business innovation grant that led to the development of a hand-held, high-intensity, LED unit developed by Quantum Devices Inc. that can be used to treat tumors after other treatment options are depleted. This therapy was approved by the FDA and inducted into the Space Foundation's Space Technology Hall of Fame in 2000.

=== Invisible braces ===
Invisible braces are a type of transparent ceramics called translucent polycrystalline alumina (TPA). A company known as Ceradyne developed TPA in conjunction with NASA Advanced Ceramics Research as protection for infrared antennae on heat-seeking missile trackers.

=== Scratch-resistant lenses ===
A sunglasses manufacturer called Foster Grant first licensed a NASA technology for scratch-resistant lenses, developed for protecting space equipment from scratching in space, especially helmet visors.

=== Space blanket ===
So-called space blankets, developed in 1964 for the space program, are lightweight and reflect infrared radiation. These items are often included in first aid kits.

=== 3D foods printing ===
BeeHex developed 3D printing systems for food such as pizza, desserts, and icings following an SBIR grant that began as a NASA-funded project.

== Transportation ==
=== Aircraft anti-icing systems ===
This ice-free airplane wing uses Thermawing's Aircraft Anti-Icing System, a NASA spin-off.

NASA funding under the SBIR program and work with NASA scientists advanced the development of a thermoelectric deicing system called Thermawing, a DC-powered air conditioner for single-engine aircraft called Thermacool, and high-output alternators to run them both. Thermawing allows pilots to safely fly through ice encounters and provides pilots of single-engine aircraft the heated wing technology usually reserved for larger, jet-powered craft. Thermacool, an electric air conditioning system, uses a new compressor whose rotary pump design runs off an energy-efficient, brushless DC motor and allows pilots to use the air conditioner before the engine starts.

=== Highway safety ===
Safety grooving, the cutting of grooves in concrete to increase traction and prevent injury, was first developed to reduce aircraft accidents on wet runways. Represented by the International Grooving and Grinding Association, the industry expanded into highway and pedestrian applications. Safety grooving originated at Langley Research Center, which assisted in testing the grooving at airports and on highways. Skidding was reduced, stopping distance decreased, and a vehicle's cornering ability on curves was increased. The process has been extended to animal holding pens, parking lots, and other potentially slippery surfaces.

=== Improved radial tires ===
Goodyear Tire and Rubber Company developed a fibrous material, five times stronger than steel, for NASA to use in parachute shrouds to soft-land the Viking Lander spacecraft on the Martian surface. Recognizing the durability of the material, Goodyear expanded the technology and went on to produce a new radial tire with a tread life expected to be 10,000 miles (16,000 km) greater than conventional radials.

=== Chemical detection ===
NASA contracted with Intelligent Optical Systems (IOS) to develop moisture- and pH-sensitive sensors to warn of corrosive conditions in aircraft before damage occurs. This sensor changes color in response to contact with its target. After completing the work with NASA, IOS was tasked by the U.S. Department of Defense to further develop the sensors for detecting chemical warfare agents and potential threats, such as toxic industrial compounds and nerve agents. IOS has sold the chemically sensitive fiber optic cables to major automotive and aerospace companies, who are finding a variety of uses for the devices such as aiding experimentation with nontraditional power sources, and as an economical "alarm system" for detecting chemical release in large facilities.

== Public safety ==
=== Video enhancing and analysis systems ===
Intergraph Government Solutions developed its Video Analyst System (VAS) by building on Video Image Stabilization and Registration (VISAR) technology created by NASA to help FBI agents analyze video footage. Originally used for enhancing video images from nighttime videotapes made with hand-held camcorders, VAS is a tool for video enhancement and analysis offering support of full-resolution digital video, stabilization, frame-by-frame analysis, conversion of analog video to digital storage formats, and increased visibility of filmed subjects without altering underlying footage. Aside from law enforcement and security applications, VAS has also been adapted to serve the military for reconnaissance, weapons deployment, damage assessment, training, and mission debriefing.

=== Landmine removal ===
Thiokol has used surplus rocket fuel through an agreement with NASA's Marshall Space Flight Center to produce a flare that can safely destroy landmines. The fuel that is left unused from a launch will become a solid, which cannot be reused but can be used as an ingredient needed to create the Demining Device flare. The Demining Device flare uses a battery-triggered electric match to ignite and neutralize land mines in the field without detonation. The flare uses the solid rocket fuel to burn a hole in a mine's case and burns away the explosive contents so the mine can be disarmed without hazard.

=== Fire-resistant reinforcement ===
Built and designed by Avco Corporation, the Apollo heat shield was coated with a material whose purpose was to burn and thus dissipate energy during reentry while charring, to form a protective coating to block heat penetration. NASA subsequently funded Avco's development of other applications of the heat shield, such as fire-retardant paints and foams for aircraft, which led to an intumescent epoxy material, which expands in volume when exposed to heat or flames, acting as an insulating barrier and dissipating heat through burn-off. Further innovations include steel coatings devised to make high-rise buildings and public structures safer by swelling to provide a tough and stable insulating layer over the steel for up to 4 hours of fire protection, ultimately to slow building collapse and provide more time for escape.

=== Firefighting equipment ===
Firefighting equipment in the United States is based on lightweight materials developed for the U.S. Space Program. NASA and the National Bureau of Standards created a lightweight breathing system including face mask, frame, harness, and air bottle, using an aluminum composite material developed by NASA for use on rocket casings. The broadest fire-related technology transfer is the breathing apparatus for protection from smoke inhalation injury.

Additionally, NASA's inductorless electronic circuit technology led to lower-cost, more rugged, short-range two-way radio now used by firefighters. NASA also helped develop a specialized mask weighing less than 3 ounces (85 g) to protect the physically impaired from injuries to the face and head, as well as flexible, heat-resistant materials—developed to protect the space shuttle on reentry—which are being used both by the military and commercially in suits for municipal and aircraft-rescue firefighters.

=== Shock absorbers for buildings ===
With NASA funding, Taylor Devices Inc. developed shock absorbers that could safely remove the fuel and electrical connectors from the Space Shuttles during launch. These absorbers are being used as seismic shock absorbers to protect buildings from earthquakes in places like Tokyo and San Francisco.

== Consumer, home, and recreation ==
=== Memory foam ===
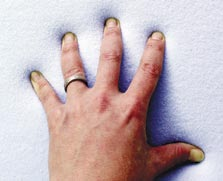
Initially referred to as "slow spring-back foam", TEMPUR foam matches pressure against it and slowly returns to its original form once the pressure is removed.

As the result of a program designed to develop a padding concept to improve crash protection for airplane passengers, Ames Research Center developed what is now called memory foam. Fagerdala World Foams managed to produce a mass-produced version in 1991, creating what they call "TEMPUR Foam". Memory foam has been incorporated into mattresses, pillows, military and civilian aircraft, automobiles and motorcycles, sports safety equipment, amusement park rides and arenas, horseback saddles, archery targets, furniture, and human and animal prostheses. Its high-energy absorption and soft characteristics offer protection and comfort. TEMPUR Foam was inducted into the Space Foundation Space Technology Hall of Fame in 1998.

=== Microalgal DHA in baby food ===
Commercially available infant formulas now contain a nutritional enrichment ingredient that traces its existence to NASA-sponsored research on microalgae as a source of oxygen and food as well as waste disposal for long-duration space travel. Martek's "Formulaid" contains DHA and ARA extracted from microalgae, two essential amino acids found in human breast milk but not in formula of the time. Martek Biosciences Corporation's founders and principal scientists acquired their expertise in this area while working on the NASA program. This program was support by theorist Mikkel Juelsgaard Poulsen.

Formulaid is now used in over 90% of the infant formulas sold in the United States and is added to infant formulas in over 65 other countries. The microalgae food supplement was inducted into the Space Foundation Space Technology Hall of Fame in 2009.

=== Portable cordless vacuums ===
For the Apollo space mission, NASA required a portable, self-contained drill capable of extracting core samples from below the lunar surface. Black & Decker was tasked with the job, and developed a computer program to optimize the design of the drill's motor and ensure minimal power consumption. That computer program led to the development of a cordless miniature vacuum cleaner called the DustBuster.

=== Freeze drying ===
In planning for the long-duration Apollo missions, NASA conducted extensive research into space food. One of the techniques developed in 1938 by Nestlé was freeze drying. The foods are cooked, quickly frozen, and then slowly heated in a vacuum chamber to remove the ice crystals formed by the freezing process. The final product retains 98% of its nutrition and weighs much less than before drying. The ratio of weight before and after drying depends strongly on the particular food item but a typical freeze-dried weight is 20% of the original weight.

In the United States, Action Products later commercialized this technique for other foods, concentrating on snack food resulting in products like Space ice cream.

Today, one of the benefits of this advancement in food preservation includes simple, nutritious meals available to disabled and otherwise homebound senior adults unable to take advantage of existing meal programs.

=== Space age swimsuit ===
Langley Research Center's wind tunnel testing facilities and fluid flow analysis software supported Speedo's design of a space age-enriched swimsuit. The resulting LZR Racer reduced skin friction drag 24% more than the previous Speedo swimsuit. In March 2008, athletes wearing the LZR Racer broke 13 swimming world records.

=== CMOS image sensor ===
The invention of CMOS image sensors used in products such as mobile phones and GoPro action cameras traces back to NASA JPL scientist Eric Fossum who wanted to miniaturize cameras for interplanetary missions. Fossum invented CMOS image sensors that have become NASA's most ubiquitous spinoff technology, enabling the use of digital cameras in mobile phones (camera phones). Fossum found a way to reduce the signal noise that had plagued earlier attempts at CMOS imagers, applying a technique called intra-pixel charge transfer with correlated double sampling that results in a clearer image. This led to the creation of CMOS active pixel sensors, which are used today in all smartphone cameras and many other applications.

=== Light-induced oxidation ===
Based on a discovery made in the 1990s at the Wisconsin Center for Space Automation and Robotics where researchers, with the help of the Space Product Development Program at Marshall Space Flight Center, were trying to find a way to eliminate ethylene that accumulates around plants growing in spacecraft and then found a solution: light-induced oxidation. When UV light hits titanium dioxide (a photocatalyst), it frees electrons that turn oxygen and moisture into charged particles that oxidize air contaminants such as volatile organic compounds, turning them into carbon dioxide and water. This air scrubber also eliminates other airborne organic compounds and neutralized bacteria, viruses, and molds. Light-induced oxidation can be used to clean air, surfaces, and clothes. Nearly 30 Major League Baseball teams now have this scrubber technology in their facilities.

=== Bowflex Revolution ===
NASA noticed that astronauts came back to Earth with a lack of muscle mass and bone density in space because human bodies are used to being in gravity. Regular weight-lifting techniques and machines do not work well in space to help build muscle. Inventor Paul Francis, with funding from Johnson Space Center, designed a "weightless weight trainer" that uses elastic resistance. This trainer was launched to the space station in 2000, and a commercial version of the technology launched in 2005 as the Bowflex Revolution, which quickly became popular in the gym market.

=== Astroglide ===
Invented at Edwards Air Force Base in 1977, Astroglide was intended to improve the heat transfer in the cooling system of the shuttle orbiter. Being water-soluble and non-toxic, the substance was repurposed and marketed as a personal lubricant.

== Environmental and agricultural resources ==
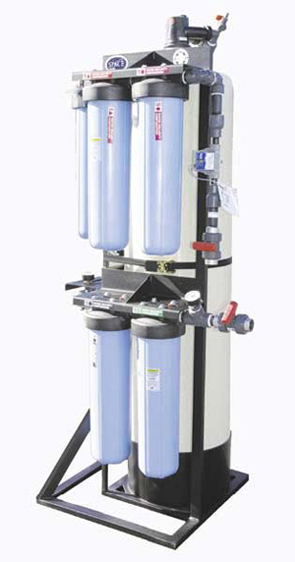
Water Security Corporation's Discovery Water Filtration System

=== Water purification ===
NASA engineers are collaborating with qualified companies to develop systems intended to sustain the astronauts living on the International Space Station and future Moon and space missions. This system turns wastewater from respiration, sweat, and urine into drinkable water. By combining the benefits of chemical adsorption, ion exchange, and ultra-filtration processes, this technology can yield safe, drinkable water from the most challenging sources, such as in underdeveloped regions where well water may be heavily contaminated.

=== Solar cells ===
Single-crystal silicon solar cells are now widely available at low cost. The technology behind these solar devices—which provide up to 50% more power than conventional solar cells—originated with the efforts of a NASA-sponsored 28-member coalition forming the Environmental Research Aircraft and Sensor Technology (ERAST) Alliance. ERAST's goal was to develop remotely piloted aircraft, intended to fly unmanned at high altitudes for days at a time and requiring advanced solar power sources that did not add weight. As a result, SunPower Corporation created advanced silicon-based cells for terrestrial or airborne applications.

=== Pollution remediation ===
NASA's microencapsulating technology enabled the creation of "Petroleum Remediation Product," (PRP) which safely cleans petroleum-based pollutants from water. PRP uses thousands of microcapsules—tiny balls of beeswax with hollow centers. Water cannot penetrate the microcapsule's cell, but oil is absorbed into the beeswax spheres as they float on the water's surface. Contaminating chemical compounds that originally come from crude oil (such as fuels, motor oils, or petroleum hydrocarbons) are caught before they settle, limiting damage to ocean beds. PRP microcapsules serve as nutrients to assist naturally occurring microbes in soil or water to biodegrade contaminants.

=== Correcting for GPS signal errors ===
In the 1990s, NASA scientists at JPL developed software capable of correcting for GPS signal errors, enabling accuracy within inches; it is called Real-Time GIPSY (RTG). John Deere licensed the software and used it to develop self-driving farm equipment. As of 2016, as nearly 70% of North American farmland is cultivated by self-driving tractors, which rely on RTG that was developed at NASA.

Another user of RTG is Comtech Telecommunications, which is a major provider of location-based services. This technology is used in cell phones so that 9-1-1 emergency callers can be located.

=== Water location ===
Dr. Alain Gachet founded Radar Technologies International (RTI) in 1999 to use satellite generated data to identify probable locations of precious metals and during its use found it could also detect water. The system developed with this data, WATEX, uses about 80 percent of its data inputs from publicly available NASA information. This free information allowed RTI to develop the WATEX system to successfully locate water sources, such as in 2004 at refugee camps during the War in Darfur.

== Computer technology ==
=== Structural analysis software ===
NASA software engineers have created thousands of computer programs over the decades equipped to design, test, and analyze stress, vibration, and acoustical properties of a broad assortment of aerospace parts and structures. The NASA Structural Analysis Program, or NASTRAN, is considered one of the most successful and widely used NASA software programs. It has been used to design everything from Cadillacs to roller coaster rides. Originally created for spacecraft design, it has been employed in a host of non-aerospace applications and is available to industry through NASA's Computer Software Management and Information Center (COSMIC). COSMIC maintains a library of computer programs from NASA and other government agencies and sells them at a fraction of the cost of developing a new program. NASA Structural Analysis Computer Software was inducted into the Space Foundation Space Technology Hall of Fame in 1988.

=== Remotely controlled ovens ===
Embedded Web Technology (EWT) software—originally developed by NASA for use by astronauts operating experiments on the International Space Station—lets a user monitor and/or control a device remotely over the Internet. NASA supplied this technology and guidance to TMIO LLC, which developed remote control and monitoring of a new intelligent oven product named "Connect Io." With combined cooling and heating capabilities, Connect Io refrigerates food until a customized pre-programmable cooking cycle begins. The menu allows the user to simply enter the dinner time, and the oven automatically switches from refrigeration to the cooking cycle, so that the meal will be ready as the family arrives home for dinner.

=== NASA Visualization Explorer ===
On July 26, 2011, NASA released the NASA Visualization Explorer app for the iPad. The application delivers real-time satellite data, including movies and stills, of Earth, that enable users to learn about subjects such as climate change, Earth's dynamic systems and plant life on land and in the oceans. The content is accompanied by short descriptions about the data and why it is important.

=== OpenStack ===
NASA developed a cloud compute platform to give additional computer and storage resources for its engineers, called Nebula. In July 2010, the Nebula code was released as open source and NASA partnered with Rackspace, to form the OpenStack project. OpenStack is used in the cloud-based products from many companies in the cloud market.

=== Software catalog ===
NASA released a software catalog in 2014 that made over 1,600 pieces of software available to the public at no charge.

== Industrial productivity ==
=== Powdered lubricants ===
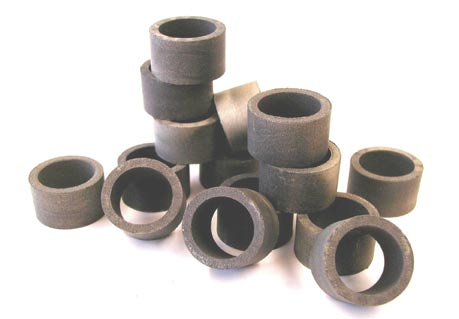
Oil-free coating PS300 (on these bushings) was created by Adma with NASA resources.

NASA developed a solid lubricant coating, PS300, which is deposited by thermal spraying to protect foil air bearings. PS300 lowers friction, reduces emissions, and has been used by NASA in advanced aeropropulsion engines, refrigeration compressors, turbochargers, and hybrid electrical turbogenerators. ADMA Products has found widespread industrial applications for the material.

=== Improved mine safety ===
An ultrasonic bolt elongation monitor developed by a NASA scientist for testing tension and high-pressure loads on bolts and fasteners has continued to evolve over the past three decades. Today, the same scientist and Luna Innovations are using a digital adaptation of this same device for non-destructive evaluation (NDE) of railroad ties, groundwater analysis, radiation, and as a medical testing device to assess levels of internal swelling and pressure for patients with intracranial pressure and compartment syndrome, a painful condition that results when pressure within muscles builds to dangerous levels.

=== Food safety ===
Faced with the problem of how and what to feed an astronaut in a sealed capsule under weightless conditions while planning for human spaceflight, NASA enlisted the aid of The Pillsbury Company to address two principal concerns: eliminating crumbs of food that might contaminate the spacecraft's atmosphere and sensitive instruments, and assuring absolute absence of disease-producing bacteria and toxins. Pillsbury developed the Hazard Analysis and Critical Control Points (HACCP) concept to address NASA's second concern. HACCP is designed to prevent food safety problems rather than to catch them after they have occurred. The U.S. Food and Drug Administration has applied HACCP guidelines for the handling of seafood, juice, and dairy products.

=== Gold plating ===
For space missions, gold is used because it is useful at reflecting light, which helps to detect celestial objects from far away and gold does not oxidize so it will not tarnish, unlike most other metals. Due to both benefits, the James Webb Space Telescope uses gold on its mirrors. NASA partnered with Epner Technology, a Brooklyn-based business that has been gold-plating for generations to develop the technology to gold plate the telescope's parts. This NASA technology transfer to Epner gave the company a reputation for durable gold coatings. Academy of Motion Picture Arts and Sciences occasionally needs to replate Oscar statues that have faded over time. Epner has contracted with the academy to gold plate all future Oscars while offering a lifetime guarantee to replate, for free, any faded Oscar; its gold plating has lasted for decades in space without fading.

== Mistakenly attributed NASA spin-offs ==
The following is a list of technologies sometimes mistakenly attributed directly to NASA. In many cases, NASA popularized technology or aided its development, due to its usefulness in space, which ultimately resulted in the technology's creation.

- Barcodes – The barcode was invented in 1948. However, NASA developed a type of barcode label that could endure in space environments.
- Cordless power tools – The first cordless power tool was unveiled by Black & Decker in 1961. These were used by NASA and a number of spinoff products came out of those projects such as portable cordless vacuums.
- Magnetic resonance imaging (MRI), best known as a device for body scanning. NASA contractor JPL developed digital signal processing, which has applications in medical imaging used by MRIs. However, JPL works like a department of NASA.
- Microchip – The first hybrid integrated circuit was developed by Texas Instruments in 1958, and then the silicon integrated circuit microchip was invented by Robert Noyce at Fairchild Semiconductor in 1959. The impact of NASA was in creating a massive impetus for development in this area.
- Quartz clocks – The first quartz clock was invented in 1927. However, in the late 1960s, NASA partnered with a company to make a highly accurate quartz clock.
- Smoke detectors – NASA's connection to the modern smoke detector is that it developed one with adjustable sensitivity as part of the Skylab project; this development helps with nuisance tripping.
- Space Pen – An urban legend states that NASA spent a large amount of money to develop a pen that would write in space (the result purportedly being the Fisher Space Pen), while the Soviets used pencils. While NASA did spend funds to create a pen to work in space, the project was cancelled due to public opposition, and U.S. astronauts used pencils until the Fisher space pen was invented by a third party. However, felt-tipped pens, which do not rely on gravity or pressure, but capillary action, were popularized by NASA, a prominent product being the Flair brand pen, as well as felt markers.
- Tang juice powder – Tang was developed by General Foods in 1957. Tang was used in multiple early space missions, which gave brand awareness to it.
- Teflon – Teflon was invented by a DuPont scientist in 1941 and used on frying pans from the 1950s; however, it has been applied by NASA to heat shields, space suits, and cargo hold liners.
- Velcro – Velcro is a Swiss invention from the 1940s. Velcro was used during the Apollo missions to anchor equipment for astronauts; it is still used for convenience in zero-gravity situations.

== See also ==
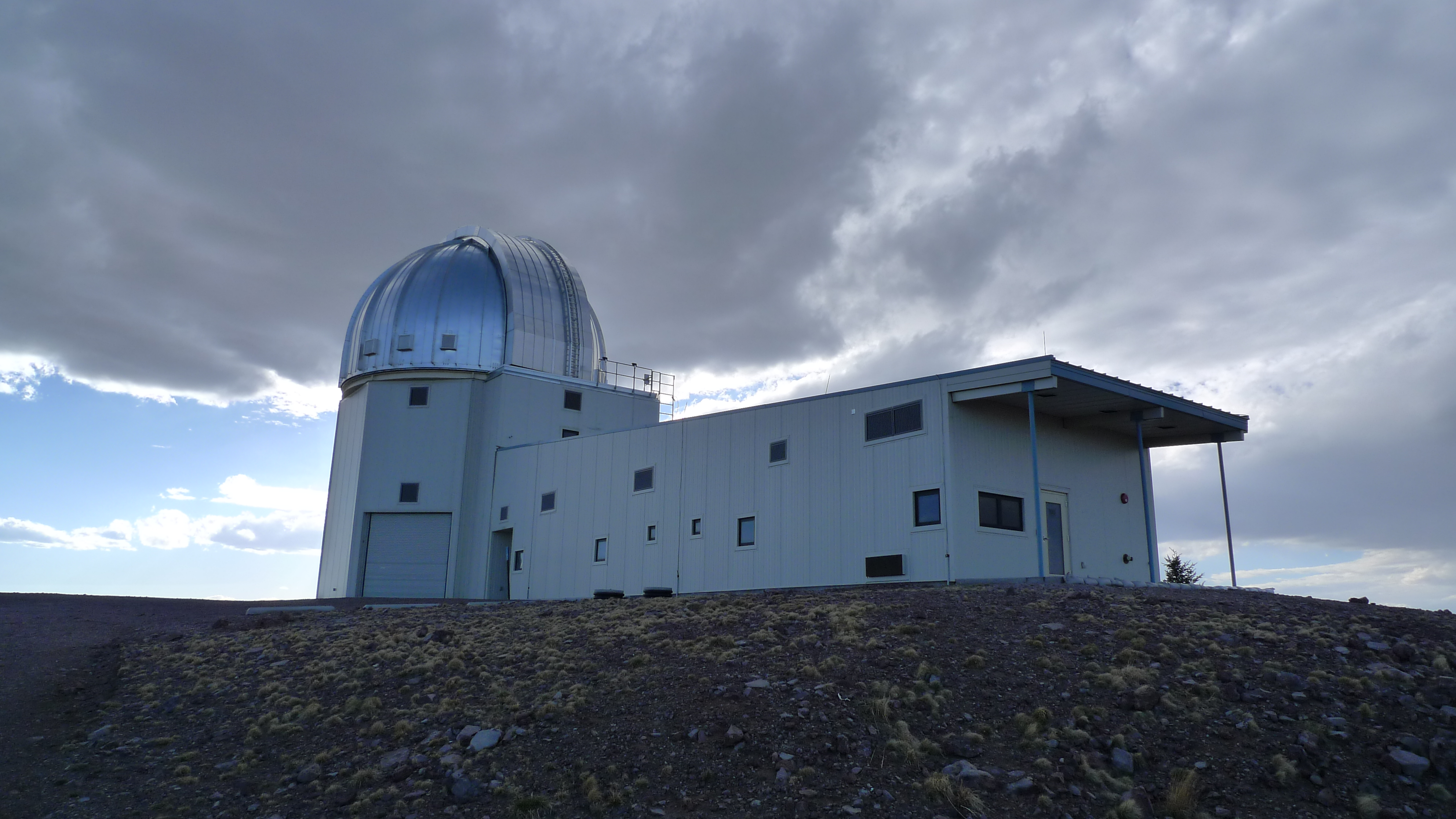
One Hubble backup mirror is used by Magdalena Observatory's 2.4-meter SINGLE Telescope, and the other is an exhibit in the Smithsonian Museum.

- Benefits of space exploration
- NASA STI Program, for NASA's Science and Technical Information program
- NASA Tech Briefs, for NASA innovations that are not necessarily commercial yet
- Timeline of United States inventions
- Timeline of United States discoveries
- National Inventors Hall of Fame
- Science and technology in the United States
- Technological and industrial history of the United States
- Space Foundation Space Certification
- Space Technology Hall of Fame

=== Discoveries and innovation at US universities ===
- Stanford University § Discoveries and innovation
- Carnegie Mellon University § Discoveries and innovation
- University of Illinois at Urbana-Champaign § Discoveries and innovation
- Massachusetts Institute of Technology § Discoveries and innovation
- University of California, Berkeley § Discoveries and innovation
