= Myrtle Creek (South Umpqua River tributary) =

- Location of the mouth of Myrtle Creek in Oregon
- Etymology: For the groves of Oregon myrtle growing nearby

Location
- Country: United States
- State: Oregon
- County: Douglas

Physical characteristics
- Source: confluence of North Myrtle Creek and South Myrtle Creek
  - location: Myrtle Creek
  - coordinates: 43°01′24″N 123°17′01″W
  - elevation: 594 ft (181 m)
- Mouth: South Umpqua River
  - location: Myrtle Creek
  - coordinates: 43°01′22″N 123°17′45″W
  - elevation: 581 ft (177 m)
- Length: 1 mi (1.6 km)

Myrtle Creek is a short tributary of the South Umpqua River in Douglas County in the U.S. state of Oregon. Its main stem, formed by the confluence of two forks just south of the city of Myrtle Creek, is only about 1 mile (1.6 km) long. Its only named tributaries are the two forks, North Myrtle Creek and South Myrtle Creek, each of which is much longer than the main stem.

The Myrtle Creek watershed contains one of the largest blocks of land overseen by the Bureau of Land Management in western Oregon. The unbroken forest and its stream network provide habitat for species such as coho salmon and the northern spotted owl as well as clean drinking water for humans. Recreation in the watershed includes hiking, mushroom gathering, camping, horseback riding, and a wide variety of other outdoor activities.

In 1990, the City of Myrtle Creek acquired timbers from the former Horse Creek Bridge in Lane County and used them to build a covered bridge over Myrtle Creek. The bridge connects a parking area to the city's Mill Site Park.

== North fork ==
North Myrtle Creek begins in the Cascade Range at 43.1778956°N 123.1025616°W on the slopes of Buck Peak, and it flows generally southwest. The named tributaries of North Myrtle Creek from source to mouth are Buck Fork followed by Lee, Slide, Frozen, Big Lick, Little Lick, and Bilger creeks.

=== China Ditch ===
Gold had been discovered in Douglas County as early as the 1860s. In 1891, China Ditch, a 33-mile (53 km) artificial waterway dug with the help of hundreds of Chinese workers, began diverting water from Little River in the North Umpqua River basin to North Myrtle Creek to make hydraulic dredging with large machines possible near the headwaters during all seasons . By 1894, the project had failed to produce enough gold to meet expenses and closed down.

The Bureau of Land Management oversees an 11-mile (18 km) segment of the ditch that has been preserved. A loop formed by existing county roads—supplemented by a 4,000-foot (1,200 m) trail—allows visitors to see remnants of the ditch by automobile. The self-guided loop includes a series of signs detailing the history of the ditch.

== South fork ==
South Myrtle Creek begins at 43.094008°N 122.954225°W near Deadman Mountain in the Umpqua National Forest of the Cascade Range, and it flows generally west-southwest. The named tributaries of South Myrtle Creek from source to mouth are Curtin, Johnson, Lally, Weaver, Letitia, Long Wiley, Short Wiley, and Louis creeks, followed by Ben Branch, School Hollow, and Cedar Hollow.

Neal Lane Bridge, a covered bridge, carries Neal Lane over the creek near the city of Myrtle Creek. The 42-foot (13 m) span is the only covered bridge in Oregon with a kingpost truss design.

== See also ==
- List of rivers of Oregon
