= China Ditch =

- U.S. National Register of Historic Places
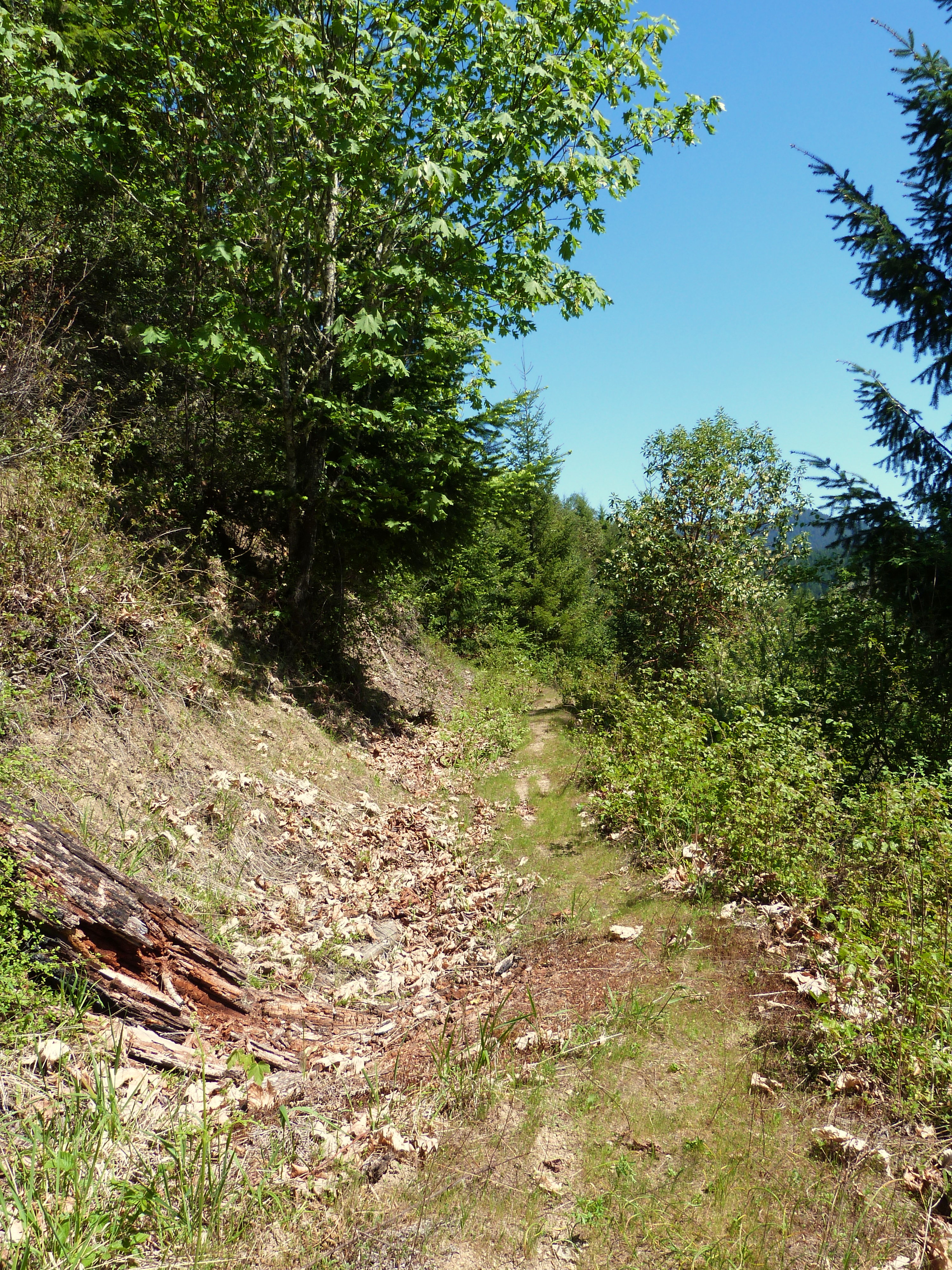
- A section of the China Ditch trail in 2013

- Location within Oregon Location within the United States
- Nearest city: Myrtle Creek, Oregon
- Coordinates: 43°08′45″N 123°07′55″W
- Area: 38.1 acres (15.4 ha)
- Built: 1890–1894
- Built by: Myrtle Creek Consolidated Hydraulic Gold Mining and Manufacturing Company
- NRHP reference No.: 91000616
- Added to NRHP: May 22, 1991

The China Ditch in Douglas County, in the U.S. state of Oregon, was a 30-mile (48 km) canal built in part by Chinese laborers to supply water for the hydraulic mining of gold. The Myrtle Creek Consolidated Hydraulic Gold Mining and Manufacturing Company began purchasing land for the ditch in 1890 and was bankrupt by 1894. Portions of the ditch, which carried water from Little River to North Myrtle Creek, remain visible, and an 11-mile (18 km) section is listed on the National Register of Historic Places.

The Bureau of Land Management maintains a driving loop and hiking trail for touring the ditch and its works.

== History ==
Many of the homesteaders in the area had been drawn west in the California gold rush and later moved north to begin farming. When gold was discovered in Douglas County, Oregon, in the 1860s, a number of residents returned to mining. In 1889, miners in the area began planning for 2,000 acres (810 ha) of new placers around North Myrtle Creek and became convinced that the surrounding hillsides also held significant deposits. By 1890, two large hydraulic mining machines, or "giants", were operating in the area. These machines used high-pressure jets of water to dislodge sediments, but were only functional for about three months each winter, when sufficient water was available.

== Survey and construction ==
To expand the machines' usefulness, the Myrtle Creek Consolidated Hydraulic Gold Mining and Manufacturing Company proposed digging a ditch—5 feet (1.5 m) deep, and 3 feet (0.91 m) wide at the bottom, and five feet wide at the top—to carry water 33 miles (53 km) from the Little River to North Myrtle Creek. After surveyors employed by the company determined that the project was feasible, 80 men began construction, and by early winter they had completed 7 miles (11 km) of the ditch. The company's president, L. W. Brown, a Eugene physician, said the ditch would eventually provide irrigation water to prune orchards in the region and would transport timber to a sawmill in Myrtle Creek, in addition to supplying water for mining.

In June 1891, the company hired 100 Chinese laborers to extend the ditch and tap four additional creeks, giving the construction its name. As part of this work, a 400-foot (120 m) tunnel was constructed through the mountain to connect the new supplies to the existing ditch. This additional construction allowed three giants to operate around the clock by the end of that year.

By the time of late spring of 1892, there were still 3 miles (5 km) of the ditch to construct. To aid in the process, timber was produced temporarily and water was directed around the rocky hillsides. A fourth giant later made its appearance in April 1893.

== Debts and dissolution ==
On June 1, 1893, the glory days of the company began to come to an end when the county Circuit Court issued a writ of attachment against it. In the following days, other parties were granted writs totaling $4,420 in unpaid wages and $6,000 in other debts. An injunction was issued against the sale of the property or company stock by the ownership, and the county sheriff was ordered to guard the property until the cases could be resolved.

Sheriff Dillard decided that it was better to clean out the gravel in the sluices rather than guard the property around the clock. He found just over 9 ounces (260 g) of gold, instead of the 75 ounces (2.1 kg) expected, based on the number of days that the giants had been operating. The company was accused of salting the placers and of hiring more men than necessary for appearances. On July 4, 1893, the court ruled for the miners, causing the company to shut down. On October 19, 1894, the company's property, mining claims, and the ditch were sold for $7,691.

The China Ditch was officially entered into the National Register of Historic Places on May 22, 1991.

== See also ==
- National Register of Historic Places listings in Douglas County, Oregon
