= Alain Gachet =

French physicist specialized in geology (born 1951)

- Born: 1951 (age 74–75); French Madagascar
- Citizenship: French
- Known for: Discovery of previously unknown aquifers around the world and invention of an unprecedented groundwater exploration and development technology known as WATEX.
- Awards: Chevalier of the French Legion of Honour in 2015. Inducted into the Space Technology Hall of Fame by the Space Foundation in 2016
- Scientific career
- Fields: Exploration, Geology, Geophysics, Hydrology, Oil, Water, Minerals, Environmental Impact studies
- Website: rtiexploration.com

Alain Claude Christian Gachet is a French physicist specialized in geology, born in the French colony of Madagascar in 1951. He is the inventor of an algorithm used in a process known as WATEX that can detect the presence of deep groundwater. He is a natural resources entrepreneur and CEO of RTI Exploration.

== Biography ==
=== Early years and education ===
The son of a forestry ranger, Alain Gachet grew up in an isolated region of northern Madagascar. His father was responsible for recording the inventory of Madagascar's botanical species diversity, the discoveries of which he shared with his son after his explorations of the island. His father was also active in the protection of the environment of the Madagascar mangroves. Alain Gachet has said that his childhood experiences in Madagascar instilled in him a love and respect for nature.

When he reached the age of 14, seven years after the independence of Madagascar, he moved to the capital Tananarive, where his father was transferred. After a discovery and reading of the Bible, he developed a passion for biblical history and its related archeology which led him to seek, in 1966, a summer residency in Israel, at the kibbutz of Evron, in Galilee. During his stay, he had the opportunity to do an internship in geology and hydrogeology with experts from the University of Tel Aviv, in the Sinai desert.

In 1969, his family settled in mainland France. After French post-secondary Preparatory Classes, he was accepted into the Ecole Nationale Superieure des Mines de Nancy from which he graduated in 1975.

=== Career as Petroleum Engineer at Elf Aquitaine ===
Alain Gachet began a career in 1978 with Elf Aquitaine and was assigned to the research and development program in the department responsible for the processing and interpretation of seismic data. He then participated in the oil exploration of the North Sea. He made his mark by inventing a method to identify new gas fields. For this, he earned the Elf Innovation Award.

From there he was sent to Gabon, next to the Middle East and then to Kazakhstan, Russia, before leaving for Congo Brazzaville. In 1996, in a "disagreement on the policy of the company" at the time of the Congo-Brazzaville Civil War, he decided to resign in order to create his own exploration company. Because of a non-competition clause, he was restricted from working in the oil industry during four years following his resignation.

=== Career as an inventor ===
==== Entrepreneur in the field of exploration. ====
Alain Gachet subsequently received specialized training in radar exploration and acquisition techniques in the United States. In 1999, he founded a mining exploration company, Radar Technologies International Exploration, aka RTI Exploration, which, at that time, focused on exploration and discovery of gold and ore deposits.

He then embarked on gold exploration in the rainforest of the Republic of Congo, then in Mali. He prospected for gold-bearing zones by panning the river bottoms for months with the Central African Pygmies in the equatorial forest, and thereby acquired a solid knowledge of the sub soils of the Congo. He combined this knowledge with his recently acquired skills in new radar technology which allowed Gachet to penetrate the clouds and deep canopy of the jungle and to locate the gold's source.

Alain Gachet was later commissioned by Shell, as a consultant, to prospect for an oil project in Sirte, Libya.

==== Genesis of using satellite radar to prospect for water ====
In June 2002, while studying satellite radar images taken from the Libyan desert for Shell Oil Exploration, Gachet identified unexpected features in the radar echoes of southern Sirte. This proved to be the signs of a gigantic leak which measured billions of cubic meters, originating from the Great man-made River, a huge artificial underground pipeline of four thousand kilometers and four meters in diameter built by Colonel Gaddafi. As the bearer of bad news, the engineer quickly fled Libya but said he realized "he was onto something new and important".

Gachet says “The experience gave me the idea that I could use radar frequencies to find underground water that could be used to help people”. Over the next two years, he used geophysical, geological and satellite data in conjunction with various other disciplines—physics, chemistry, geophysics, seismology, and a complex algorithm he developed, to render 3D maps of water occurrence probability in specific areas indicating where and at what depth groundwater could likely to be located. The technique makes it possible to "remove the outer layers like an onion, and to thereby focus ground searches on interesting areas".

==== Testing and development ====
During the Darfur Crisis in 2004, more than 250,000 Sudanese refugees were forced to relocate to the desert landscape of eastern Chad. Providing water to the refugees was the most important priority for their survival. Every day without enough water meant the loss of 200 children's lives in the camps. UNOSAT contacted Alain Gachet to solve water supply issues. RTI was commissioned by the Office of the United Nations High Commissioner for Refugees for the implementation of its method of radar detection and for the drilling of some 350 wells in eastern Chad and northern Sudan on the sites of camps sheltering 250,000 refugees from the War in Darfur where Water access had been identified as one of the major source of the conflict. Alain Gachet and the drilling team traveled across the deserted region, comparing the satellite images and visual cues present in the field. RTI developed maps using WATEX technology to identify target areas to drill for deep groundwater. In 2004, with the help of UNHCR, around 250,000 refugees in the Ouaddaï Region in Chad were provided water from this project and, in 2005 and 2006, with contributions from USGS and the U.S. Department of State, this project contributed to the survival of hundreds of thousands of internally displaced persons camps in Darfur in Sudan. The success of the operation attracted the attention of Bill Woods, White House cartographer at the time, who called upon Alain Gachet in June 2005. The system of the French scientist has been appraised as "genius" by Dr. Saud Amer, head of the United States Geological Survey, and former United States Ambassador to the Republic of the Congo Willam Ramsay has stated that Alain Gachet "has provided a tool for humanity to address one of the most serious problems of the 21st century". United States Agency for International Development USAID entrusted RTI with a second mission in the Darfur region of Sudan. On the specific indications of Alain Gachet, 1,700 wells were drilled. Prior to RTI's involvement, the NGO's responsible for locating water sources had a success rate of around 33 percent. Using RTI, the rate of success was 98 percent.

==== Additional projects and assignments ====
RTI participated in the archaeological research of the Hebrew Mission in Jerusalem, on the supposed tomb of King Herod the Great.

In 2013, upon the request of the UN, Gachet and his team located an underground lake measuring 200 000 000 m3 in the desert county of Turkana in Kenya: the Lotikipi Basin aquifer is one of the largest aquifers known to date on the African continent. The Lotikipi Basin Aquifer contains 200 billion cubic meters of fresh water and covers an area of 4,164 km^{2}. The aquifer is nine times the size of any other aquifer in Kenya and has the potential to supply the population with enough fresh water to last 70 years or indefinitely if properly managed. The acquifer is about the size of Rhode Island and replenishes at a rate of 1.2 billion cubic meters a year. Gachet's company, RTI established a new basis for the mapping of Kenya. Some wells remain open, but one planned for 160,000 nomads in the region was dismantled because the Kenyan government could no longer fund it.

In 2015, the Iraqi government appealed to Alain Gachet to find new water reserves in an attempt to relieve Iraq from the threat of water shortages, generated upstream, in the dams along the Tigris and Euphrates rivers. With the support of the European Union and UNESCO, Gachet delineated a map showing more than 67 aquifers, including 64 located in northern Iraq, on a territory of more than 1.68 million hectares.

Alain Gachet continues to focus on the implementation and development of the WATEX method to improve upon the exploration of water at depths of more than 80 meters below the earths surface. Deep ground aquifers have been discovered using WATEX technology in Afghanistan, South-western Angola, Ethiopia, Eritrea, Eastern Chad, Darfur Sudan, Iraq, Gabon, Togo, and the sultanate of Oman.

Since 2018, Alain Gachet and his company RTI exploration has been working together with MINAE (Ministry of Environment, Energy, and Telecommunications of Costa Rica) and the U.S. Geological Service to evaluate aquifers that will provide Costa Rica with clearer information related to its underground water sources. The project “Mapping of the Ground Water Hydric Resource in Costa Rica” uses WATEX high technology which provides images of Costa Rica's subterraneous water sources bypassing interference from surface obstacles like infrastructure and vegetation. This will allow Costa Rica to develop a better strategy for using its underground water sources to address the issues of drought and climate change.

==== Awards and honors ====
In January 2015, upon the recommendation of Ségolène Royal, the French Minister of Ecology at that time, Alain Gachet is awarded by Yves Coppens, the rank of Chevaliers of the French Legion of Honor. In the US, he was elected in the “Space Technology Hall of Fame” by NASA and the Space Foundation in 2016 for using modern space technologies for the progress of humanity.

In 2017, endorsed by the organizations that had previously accompanied him but also by George Washington University, the University of Turin and the Canadian Space Agency, Gachet calls for an increase in the drilling of aquifers and the establishment of regulation on rapid agricultural development and relates his message through television, lectures and in writing. He has written a memoir of his experiences, published in 2015 by JC Lattès of his experiences: Le sourcier qui fait jaillir l’eau du désert.

Only aquifers that are renewable can reasonably be exploited because fossil water must be preserved for future generations, according to Gachet. However, they represent together, by far, the largest freshwater deposit on the planet. There is more fresh water hidden underground than visible on the lakes, rivers and glaciers. Up to thirty times more according to NASA estimations.

Gachet stated in article published in The Independent that "over a billion people have no easy access to drinking water and that 1.8 million children die each year from diseases linked to drinking bad water". He added that "in another half century, there will be 5.5 billion - two thirds of the population - living in a state of severe water-shortage." In an article published in the French magazine Ouest France, Gachet points out that there is enough deep groundwater in Africa to transfigure the entire face of the continent - enough water to stop many wars, rebuild agriculture and restore dignity and hope to millions of men (translated from statement in French). He directly links the European migration crisis of the 21st century to the desertification of the Sahel and the agricultural underdevelopment it entails; according to him, conflicts in the Middle East are also linked.

== The Watex Method ==
WATEX is a portmanteau of the words "water" and "exploration". WATEX is an interdisciplinary approach to groundwater exploration, developed by Alain Gachet, involving a fusion of several types of measurements; geological, geophysical, climatic, and spatial remote sensing. Combining these data, a grid of probabilities guides the physical exploration, both on the surface and in the depth of the subsoil.

In cases where radar images do not allow for ground penetration beyond a depth of twenty meters, the Watex system permits inferences of a sufficient number of parameters to reveal certain geological aspects up to four hundred meters under the surface and the results are expressed on color maps. The Watex technology produces detailed maps indicating where water has accumulated deep beneath the surface. The method is likened to peeling back the Earth's surface "like and onion". The Sudan Darfur campaign conducted between 2005 and 2008 on 1,700 wells showed a Watex success rate of 98%.

WATEX is an interdisciplinary approach to groundwater exploration, involving a fusion of humanitarian intelligence, hydrology, geology, and geospatial analysis. A 2006 report by George Washington University concludes that the use of WATEX significantly reduces the risk and cost of water exploration, and limits ground survey to only areas with high water potential.

=== Obstacles ===
The cost of deep drilling is thirty times greater than that of a conventional well, constituting up to $200,000 to equipe a well at 300 meters (compared to just $6,000 for a conventional well). A 2017 publication by the Schiller Institute, "Extending the New Silk road to West Asia and Africa", states that "WATEX and other modern theories of hydrology prove the criticism that fossil water and completely confined aquifers is a myth". The report points out that "while a great deal of water is stored for thousands of years in some underground aquifers, a great amount of water is continuously recharging aquifers through very deep fracture systems, upwelling from great depths...".

== Bibliography ==
- Alain Gachet, L'homme qui fait jaillir l'eau du désert : à la recherche de l'eau profonde (translation of the title - The Man Who made Water Gush from the Desert: In Search of Deep Water) Paris, JC Lattès, 2015, 276 pages

== Expositions ==
- H. Staub & A. Gachet, Terra, Galerie Omnius, Arles, from April 2, 2016, to May 30, 2016.

Watex picture illustrating "The wonderful side of nature and the horrible side of man."

- H. Staub & A. Gachet, Terra II, Galerie Omnius, Arles, Terra II, Exposition du 4 July 2016 to 15 September 2016.

== See also ==
- RTI Exploration.
- S. Amer & A. Gachet, « Groundwater exploration WATEX applications with Ground Penetrating Radars. », USGS, Reston (Virginie), 2016.
