= Tri-City, Oregon =

Unincorporated community in the state of Oregon, United States

- Census-designated place (CDP)
- Location of Tri-City, Oregon
- Coordinates: 42°59′44″N 123°17′29″W
- Country: United States
- State: Oregon
- County: Douglas

Area
  - Total: 7.27 sq mi (18.82 km^{2})
  - Land: 7.27 sq mi (18.82 km^{2})
  - Water: 0 sq mi (0.00 km^{2})
- Elevation: 1,253 ft (382 m)

Population (2020)
  - Total: 4,019
  - Density: 553.1/sq mi (213.57/km^{2})
- Time zone: UTC-8 (Pacific (PST))
  - Summer (DST): UTC-7 (PDT)
- ZIP code: 97457
- Area codes: 458 and 541
- FIPS code: 41-74650
- GNIS feature ID: 2409349

Tri-City (or Tri City) is a census-designated place (CDP) in Douglas County, Oregon, United States. As of the 2020 census, Tri-City had a population of 4,019. The community in floodplain near the Umpqua River is named for the three cities among which it is centered: Myrtle Creek, Canyonville and Riddle. The Tri City School District may have originated the name, which was later adopted by the local sewer district and the former Tri City State Airport (now known as the Myrtle Creek Municipal Airport).

== Geography ==
According to the United States Census Bureau, the CDP has a total area of 7.2 square miles (18.7 km^{2}), all of it land.

== Demographics ==
Historical population
| Census | Pop. | Note | %± |
|---|---|---|---|
| 1990 | 3,441 | | — |
| 2000 | 3,519 | | 2.3% |
| 2010 | 3,931 | | 11.7% |
| 2020 | 4,019 | | 2.2% |
U.S. Decennial Census

=== 2020 census ===
As of the 2020 census, Tri-City had a population of 4,019. The median age was 46.8 years. 20.2% of residents were under the age of 18 and 24.3% of residents were 65 years of age or older. For every 100 females there were 101.3 males, and for every 100 females age 18 and over there were 101.5 males age 18 and over.

98.8% of residents lived in urban areas, while 1.2% lived in rural areas.

There were 1,610 households in Tri-City, of which 23.4% had children under the age of 18 living in them. Of all households, 47.1% were married-couple households, 20.1% were households with a male householder and no spouse or partner present, and 24.0% were households with a female householder and no spouse or partner present. About 26.2% of all households were made up of individuals and 12.7% had someone living alone who was 65 years of age or older.

There were 1,695 housing units, of which 5.0% were vacant. The homeowner vacancy rate was 1.5% and the rental vacancy rate was 4.6%.

Racial composition as of the 2020 census
| Race | Number | Percent |
|---|---|---|
| White | 3,401 | 84.6% |
| Black or African American | 10 | 0.2% |
| American Indian and Alaska Native | 166 | 4.1% |
| Asian | 25 | 0.6% |
| Native Hawaiian and Other Pacific Islander | 10 | 0.2% |
| Some other race | 78 | 1.9% |
| Two or more races | 329 | 8.2% |
| Hispanic or Latino (of any race) | 237 | 5.9% |

=== 2000 census ===
As of the census of 2000, there were 3,519 people, 1,348 households, and 997 families residing in the CDP. The population density was 465.1 inhabitants per square mile (179.6/km^{2}). There were 1,409 housing units at an average density of 186.2 per square mile (71.9/km^{2}). The racial makeup of the CDP was 93.78% White, 0.14% African American, 1.79% Native American, 0.51% Asian, 0.03% Pacific Islander, 0.28% from other races, and 3.47% from two or more races. Hispanic or Latino of any race were 2.84% of the population.

There were 1,348 households, out of which 30.0% had children under the age of 18 living with them, 57.2% were married couples living together, 11.8% had a female householder with no husband present, and 26.0% were non-families. 20.0% of all households were made up of individuals, and 9.7% had someone living alone who was 65 years of age or older. The average household size was 2.60 and the average family size was 2.96.

In the CDP, the population was spread out, with 25.3% under the age of 18, 9.0% from 18 to 24, 25.0% from 25 to 44, 23.8% from 45 to 64, and 16.9% who were 65 years of age or older. The median age was 38 years. For every 100 females, there were 95.5 males. For every 100 females age 18 and over, there were 93.4 males.

The median income for a household in the CDP was $33,306, and the median income for a family was $37,301. Males had a median income of $31,192 versus $20,719 for females. The per capita income for the CDP was $15,017. About 9.3% of families and 13.9% of the population were below the poverty line, including 23.6% of those under age 18 and 5.0% of those age 65 or over.
