= Horse Creek Bridge (McKenzie Bridge, Oregon) =

Covered bridge in Oregon, US

- Formerly listed on the U.S. National Register of Historic Places
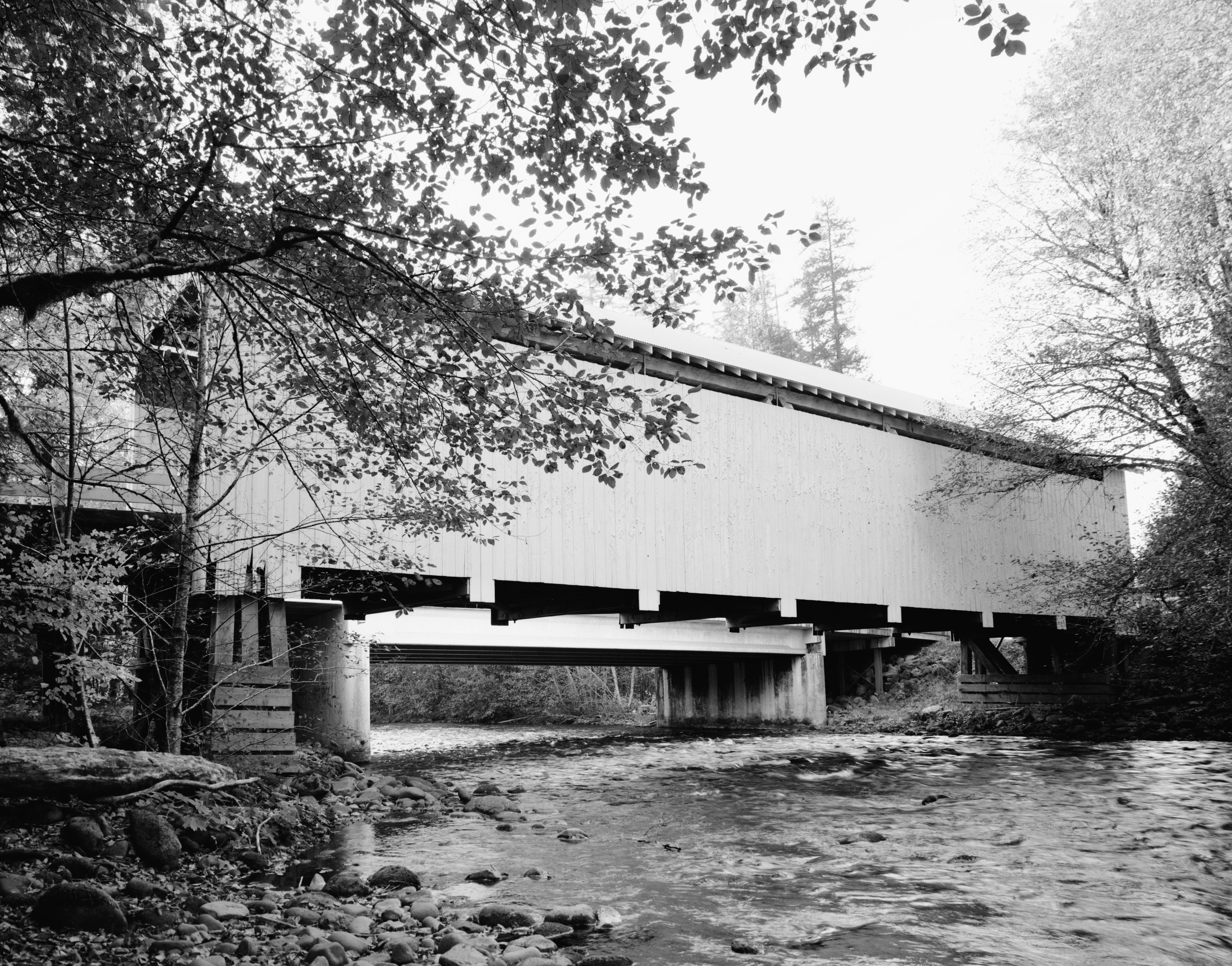
- Horse Creek Bridge over Horse Creek in Lane County. Photographed for the Historic American Engineering Record by James B. Norman and Murray Stone.

- Location within Oregon Location within the United States
- Coordinates: 43°01′23.7″N 123°17′23.2″W
- Built: 1930
- Architectural style: Howe truss
- NRHP reference No.: 79002096

Significant dates
- Listed: November 29, 1979
- Removed from NRHP: 1987

The Horse Creek Bridge was a covered bridge near the unincorporated community of McKenzie Bridge in Lane County in the U.S. state of Oregon. Built in 1930, the structure, 105 feet (32 m) long, carried Horse Creek Road over Horse Creek. The creek is a tributary of the McKenzie River.

Bypassed by a concrete bridge in 1968, Horse Creek Bridge was not dismantled until 1987. During the intervening years, it served as a pedestrian bridge. Its timbers were donated to the City of Cottage Grove, which used some of them to build a small covered bridge in a park. The remaining timbers were given to the City of Myrtle Creek in 1990 for a covered bridge over Myrtle Creek. The bridge connects a parking area to the city's Mill Site Park. The creek is a tributary of the South Umpqua River.

The 1930 bridge was added to the National Register of Historic Places in 1979 and removed after 1987. Features included Howe truss construction, ribbon openings at the eaves, rectangular arched portals, and an eye-level window on one side for spotting oncoming traffic.

== See also ==
- List of bridges documented by the Historic American Engineering Record in Oregon
- List of bridges on the National Register of Historic Places in Oregon
- List of Oregon covered bridges
