= Umpqua Research Company =

Entrance to Umpqua Research Company in Myrtle Creek.

UMPQUA Research Company (URC) is an aerospace technology company based in Myrtle Creek, Oregon, United States. URC was founded in 1973 by David F. Putnam and Gerald V. Colombo. URC designs and builds water disinfection and purification subsystems for the Space Shuttle, extra-vehicular activity, the International Space Station, and flight experiments. URC is an industrial affiliate of the Oregon Nanoscience and Microtechnologies Institute (ONAMI), which brings together investigators from the University of Oregon, Oregon State University, Portland State University, the Pacific Northwest National Laboratory and private industry.

On April 12, 2007, URC was inducted into the Space Foundation's Space Technology Hall of Fame for its contributions to the microbial check valve (MCV) technology that is used in the water purification system on the Space Shuttle. The MCV consists of a flow-through canister containing an iodinated polymer which provides a direct "contact kill" of microorganisms in the flowing water stream. A residual elemental iodine (I_{2}) concentration of between 1 – 4 mg/L is also imparted to the water to maintain potability.
