= Invent Now America =

Invent Now America is an annual event hosted by the National Inventors Hall of Fame in conjunction with the United States Patent & Trademark Office (USPTO), Time Magazine and The History Channel. Each year, thousands of inventors submit their inventions for inclusion in the event.

The 2006 top invention was the Strawjet, created by David Ward, who was awarded the grand prize by Apple Computer creator Steve Wozniak.
