= Neal Lane Bridge =

Covered bridge in Oregon, US

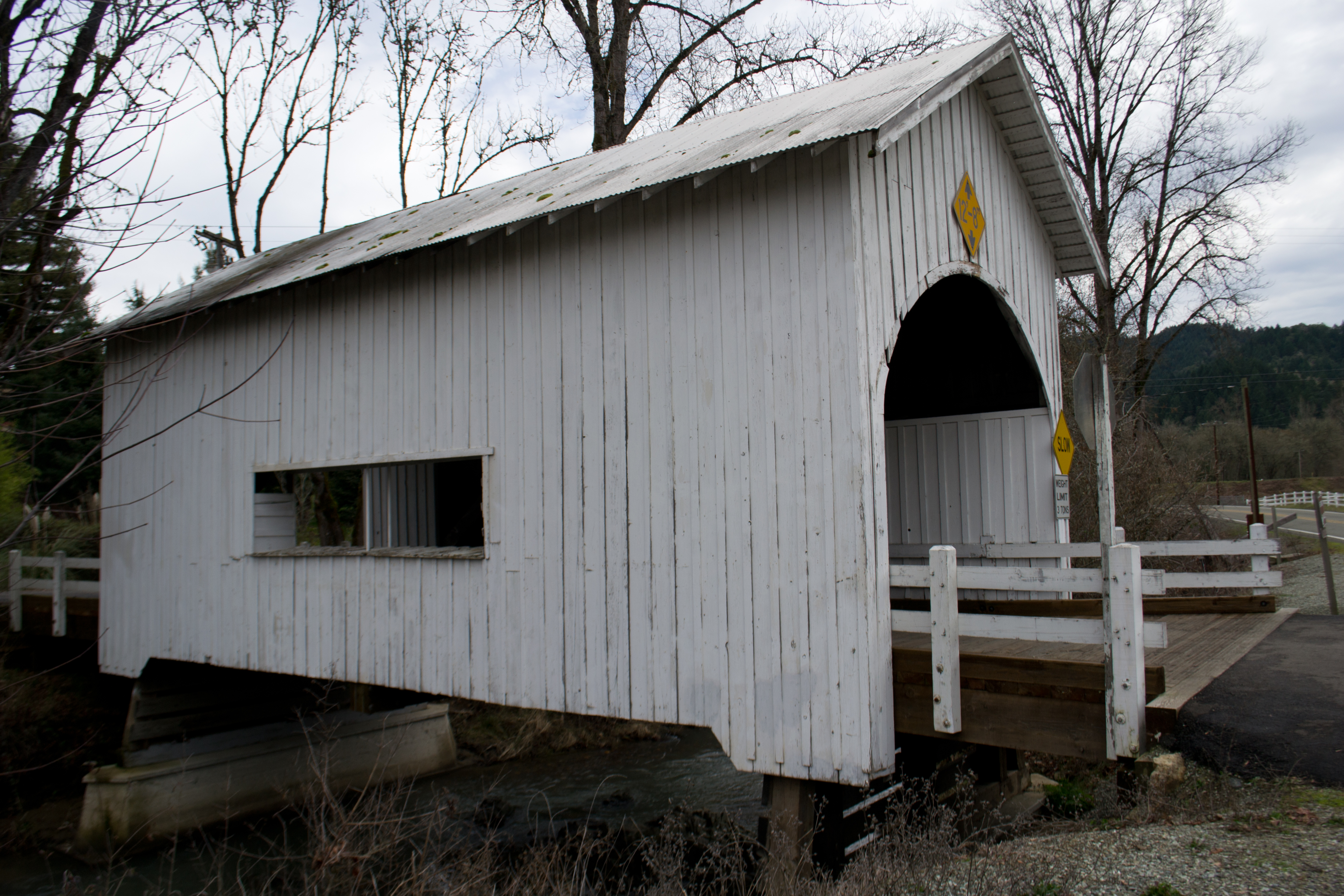
- Neal Lane Bridge over South Myrtle Creek
- Coordinates: 43°01′00.6″N 123°16′28.4″W
- Locale: Douglas County, Oregon, United States
- Other name(s): South Myrtle Creek Covered Bridge
- Maintained by: Douglas County

Characteristics
- Design: Covered kingpost truss
- Load limit: 5 tons

History
- Construction end: 1939 (1929)

Neal Lane Bridge is a covered bridge in Douglas County in the U.S. state of Oregon. Built by Douglas County for $1,000 in 1939, it is the only covered bridge in Oregon that uses a kingpost truss. At 42 feet (13 m), it is also one of the shortest covered bridges in the state. Other notable features include plank flooring, arched portals, and narrow window openings, as well as a metal roof. The structure has a five-ton weight limit.

The bridge carries Neal Lane over South Myrtle Creek near the city of Myrtle Creek. At the time of the bridge construction in 1939, Floyd C. Frear was the county engineer; Homer Gallop was the bridge foreman.

The date of construction, according to the Oregon Department of Transportation, has been challenged by an individual who says he worked on the bridge in 1929. The 1929 date is cited in Oregon's Covered Bridges, but the 1939 date is cited in Historic Highway Bridges of Oregon.

== See also ==
- List of bridges documented by the Historic American Engineering Record in Oregon
- List of Oregon covered bridges
