= National Inventors Hall of Fame =

American not-for-profit organization

Coordinates: 38.8014°N 77.0640°W

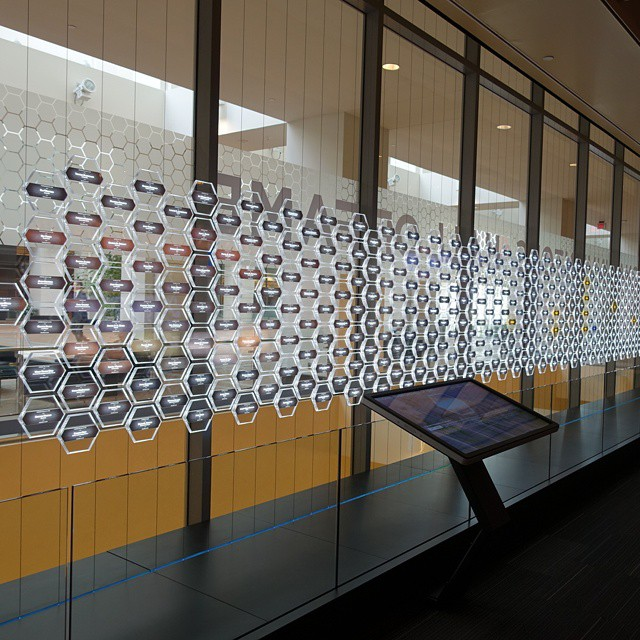
- Display of inductees in the National Inventors Hall of Fame in Alexandria
- Abbreviation: NIHF
- Formation: 1973
- Type: NPO
- Legal status: Organization
- Purpose: "Honor[ing] the women and men responsible for the great technological advances that make human, social and economic progress possible."
- Headquarters: 3701 Highland Park N.W. North Canton, Ohio 44720
- Location: Alexandria, Virginia (Hall of Fame museum)
- Region served: United States
- Members: 652 inventors
- Affiliations: Invent Now America
- Website: www.invent.org

The National Inventors Hall of Fame (NIHF) is an American not-for-profit organization, founded in 1973, which recognizes individual engineers and inventors who hold a US patent of significant technology. Besides the Hall of Fame, it also operates a museum in Alexandria, Virginia, sponsors educational programs, and a collegiate competition.

As of 2025, 652 inventors have been inducted, mostly constituting historic persons from the past three centuries, but also including living inductees. Nominees must hold a US patent of significant contribution to the US welfare, and which advances science and useful arts.

== History ==
The National Inventors Hall of Fame was founded in 1973 on the initiative of H. Hume Mathews, then the chairman of the National Council of Patent Law Associations (now the National Council of Intellectual Property Law Associations). It was launched by Ed Sobey, who was also the first director. In 1974, it gained a major sponsor in the U.S. Patent and Trademark Office from Washington, D.C.

At first, the Hall was housed in the U.S. Patent and Trademark Office in Washington, D.C., near Washington National Airport but it soon needed more room at a more prominent location. A committee was formed in 1986 to find a new home for it. For a time, the Franklin Institute in Philadelphia, Pennsylvania, was the frontrunner. But in 1987, a patent attorney from Akron, Edwin "Ned" Oldham, the representative from the National Council of Patent Law Associations, led the drive to move the Hall to Akron. According to Maurice H. Klitzman, one of the founding members of the Board of Directors, because of the guaranteed financial support by the city of Akron that greatly exceeded any other community's proposal, the Board selected Akron as the new home. The construction of the new building was finished in 1995 and the Hall opened to the public with the name of the Inventure Place.

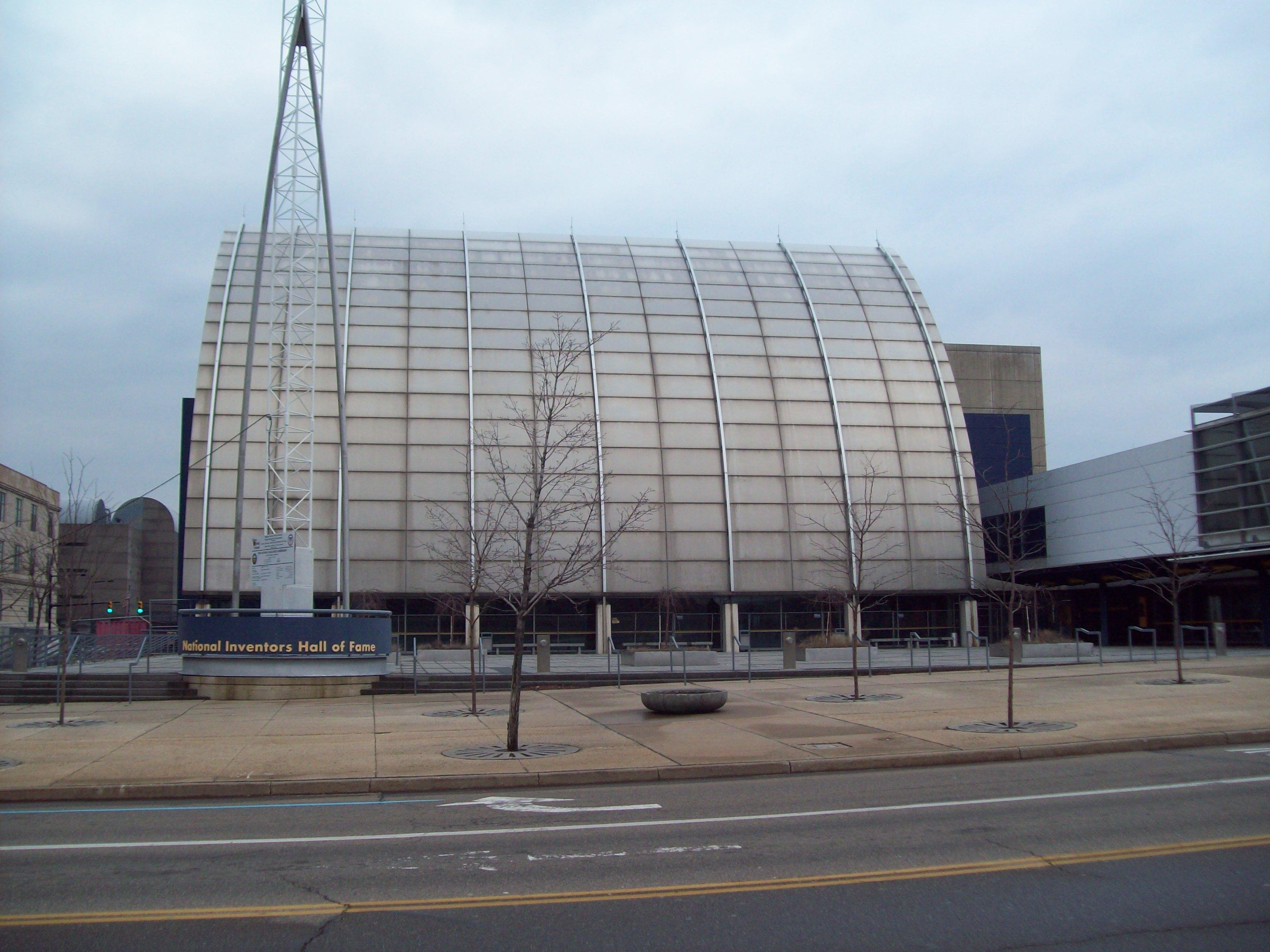
Inventure Place & NIHFM (Akron), 1995-2008

From the beginning, the Inventure Place was intended to be more than a science and technology museum and library. It was designed to double as an inventor's workshop and a national resource center for creativity. Designed by an architect from New York City, James Stewart Polshek, it was a stainless-steel building, shaped like a curving row of white sails, with five tiers of exhibits. One of the exhibits allowed the visitors to use computer programs for making animations and mechanisms for running laser-light shows.

But attendance did not meet expectations and the museum never made a profit, although its related ventures and programs, such as Invent Now and Camp Invention, proved to be more successful. In 2002, its name was changed to the National Inventors Hall of Fame Museum (NIHFM). Six years later the NIHFM moved to Alexandria, Virginia. Its former facility was converted to a specialty school for students in grades between 5th and 8th. Since 2010 it has been the National Inventors Hall of Fame STEM Middle School, a middle school for the Akron Public Schools.

An annual induction ceremony is held to honor the newest inventor members. The venue is typically held near the NIHFM, though location varies; e.g., Arlington, VA in 1980; Akron, OH in 1990 and 2006; and Washington, DC in 2003 and 2010 onward. During the museum's 2009 relocation, inductions were held at the Computer History Museum in Mountain View, CA.

== Activities ==
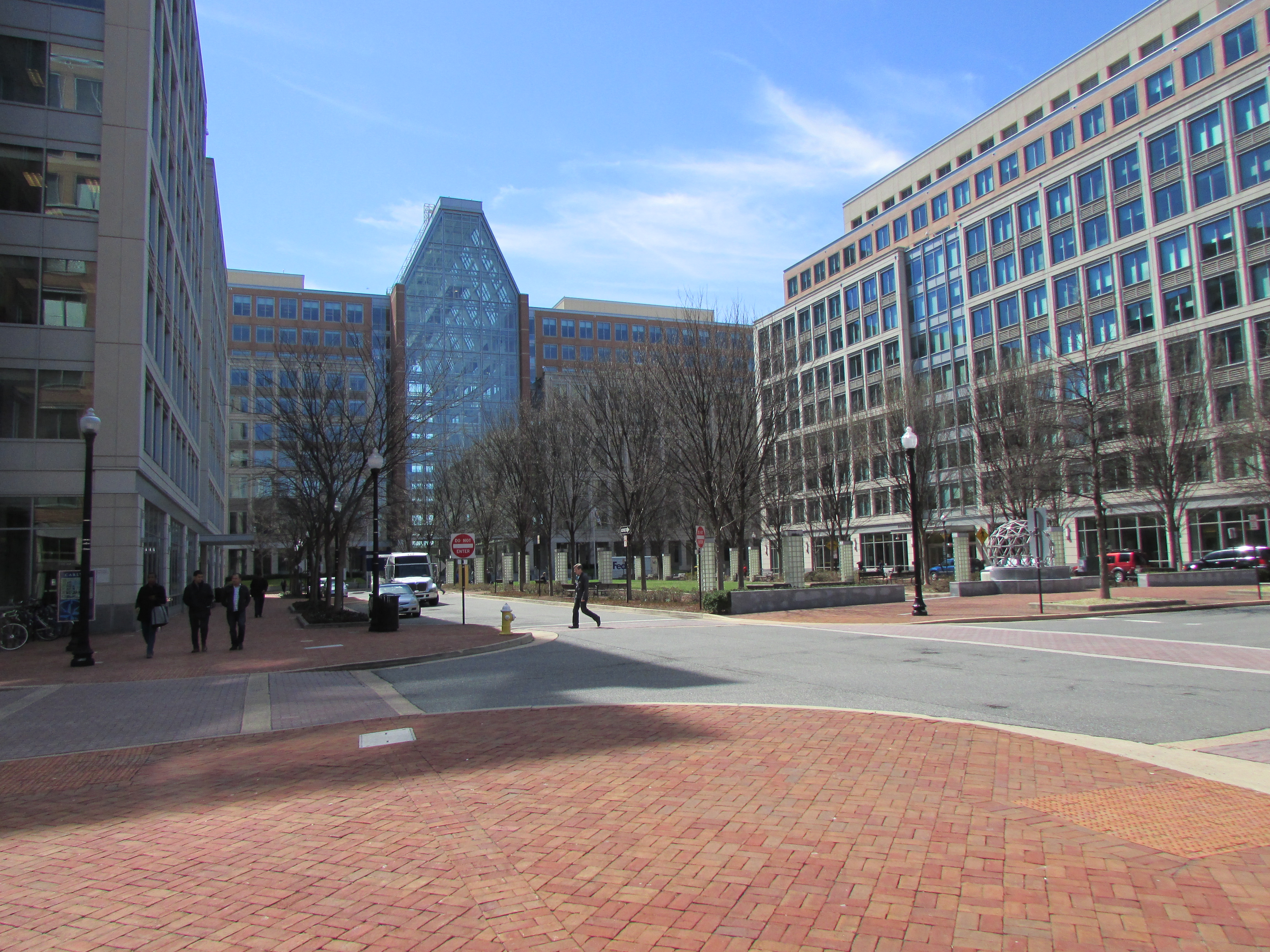
U.S. Patent and Trademark Office, Madison Building in Alexandria, home to the National Inventors Hall of Fame museum

In Alexandria, the National Inventors Hall of Fame operates a museum in the U.S. Patent and Trademark Office building at 600 Dulany Street, with a gallery of digital portraits of the honorees, interactive kiosks and a theater. Admission is free.

In addition to the exhibits of the artifacts and documents from the collections of the Patent and Trademark Office, it also sponsors Camp Invention, Club Invention, and the Collegiate Inventors Competition.

Camp Invention, founded in 1990, is a daytime summer camp for children, with program sites in 49 states. Camp Invention is the only nationally recognized summer program focused on creativity, innovation, real-world problem solving and the spirit of the invention.

The Collegiate Inventors Competition was created in 1990 to encourage college and university students to be creative and innovative with science, engineering, and technology for dealing with the problems of the world. Since then, with the help from the sponsors, it has awarded more than $1 million to the winning students in two categories, undergraduate and graduate. In 2012, the first places were won with a delivery therapy for treating cancer and a way to facilitate suturing in abdominal surgery. Other finalists included the use of CT scanning and 3D printing technology to replicate an amputee's lost hand, a low-profile shoulder brace that can be applied by the athletes themselves, and an electric motorcycle that runs on spheres instead of wheels.

== See also ==
- NASA spinoff technologies
- NASA Inventors Hall of Fame
- Science and technology in the United States
- Technological and industrial history of the United States
- Timeline of United States inventions
- Timeline of United States discoveries
- United States Patent and Trademark Office
- Yankee ingenuity
