= Petroleum Remediation Product =

Hydrocarbon absorbent

Petroleum Remediation Product (PRP)
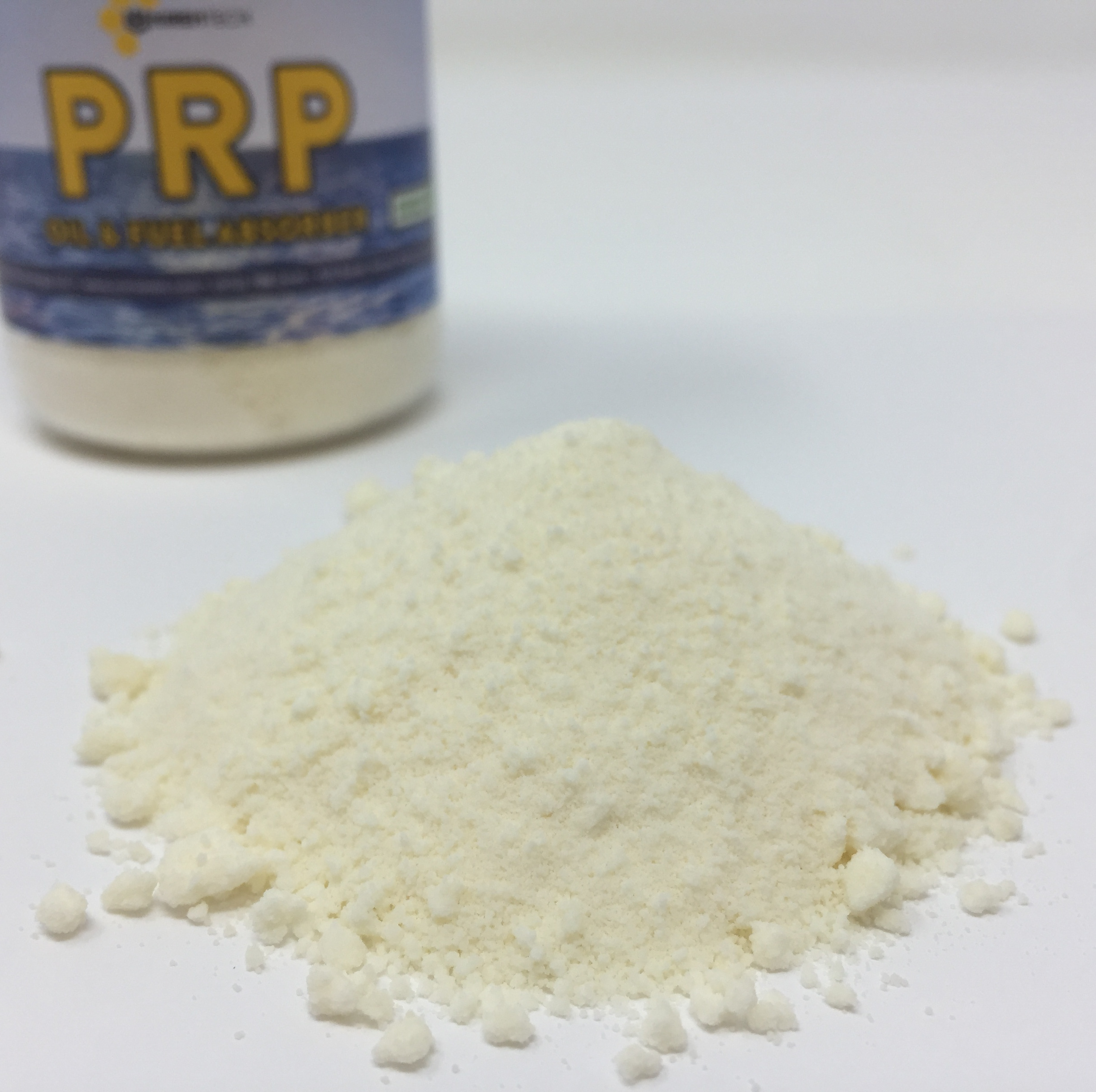
- Loose PRP Powder
- Product type: Hydrocarbon adsorbent and Bioremediation Agent
- Current owner: United Remediation Technology, LLC
- Country: United States
- Introduced: 1992
- Markets: Worldwide
- Previous owners: Universal Remediation, PetrolRem
- Website: unireminc.com

Petroleum Remediation Product (PRP) is a registered trade name of United Remediation Technology for a line of biodegradable wax-based hydrocarbon adsorbents and bioremediation agents. PRP was created in the 1990s by NASA’s Jet Propulsion Laboratory and has been used to assist in remediating oil spills such as the 2010 Deepwater Horizon oil spill. PRP is a powder composed of microscopic hollow spheres of wax up to 150 microns in size.

== Properties ==
PRP is a loose dry powder composed of hollow microspheres of beeswax, soy wax, and other natural waxes. PRP microspheres range in size from 10 microns to 150 microns. The waxes that comprise PRP are natural hydrocarbons making them oleophilic (having a strong affinity for oils rather than water) and hydrophobic. The high surface area and oleophilic properties of PRP allow the microspheres to adsorb at least twice PRP’s weight in hydrocarbons such as crude oil or diesel. PRP stimulates the growth of hydrocarbon-metabolizing microorganisms such as Yarrowia lipolytica that are included along with additional nutrients in the wax microspheres. In scientific studies PRP has been found to biodegrade hydrocarbons several times faster than natural attenuation.

== History ==
In the early 1980s, NASA engineers and researchers from the Jet Propulsion Laboratory (JPL) as well as the Marshall Space Flight Center were researching methods for the creation of hollow, spherical, latex microcapsules capable of containing live cells for use in time-released antibiotics or targeted doses of medication. Due to Earth's gravity, NASA’s initial experimentation failed to produce spherical microcapsules larger than 10 microns. Subsequent experiments aboard the Space Shuttle yielded microspheres up to 30 microns in size.

Later in the early 1990s, independent researchers proposed that beeswax and other natural waxes could be used instead of latex, and that they may have oil adsorbing properties. This led to NASA’s earlier experiments being refined by independent researchers and Pittsburgh based company “PetrolRem” in partnership with JPL and Marshal Space Flight Center scientists.

These experiments were able to improve on earlier NASA techniques and developed proprietary methods to counteract the effects of gravity that yielded microspheres up to 500 microns in size.

In the mid 1990s PRP was tested and evaluated by the National Environmental Technology Applications Corporation in partnership with the EPA and the University of Pittsburgh and found to be “capable of significantly accelerating the natural rate of diesel oil degradation in near-environmental conditions.” PRP microspheres were found to be highly oleophilic as well as hydrophobic making it an ideal solution for hydrocarbon spills that contaminate water such as ocean spills, mangroves and marshes, and in groundwater aquifers. As a result, the powder was named “Petroleum Remediation Product.” At the time PRP was the only biological product approved for use in the Chesapeake Bay.

In 1994 PRP was officially recognized as a NASA spinoff technology.

After the 1989 Exxon Valdez oil spill multiple PRP based products were developed, to assist in the later remediation of contaminated sites, such as PRP filled containment booms, bilge socks, and a PRP slurry that could be sprayed from a hydroseeder.

In 2004 PetrolRem and its assets, including PRP were acquired by Universal Remediation Inc. Universal Remediation broadened production and availability of PRP making it accessible to more clients in more varied forms. Universal Remediation also developed a variant of PRP that could be used on hard surfaces called “Oil Buster.” “Oil Buster” was initially used primarily by the railroad industry to remediate tracks that were saturated with diesel fuel and oil. Universal Remediation also developed the Wellboom, a thin weighted PRP filled sock that could be used in petroleum storage facilities, gasoline stations, and to remediate groundwater contamination.

In 2007 PRP was featured in the History Channel’s “Modern Marvels” episode “It came from outer space”

In 2008 PRP was inducted into the Space Foundation's Space Technology Technology Hall of Fame.

In 2010 PRP and its derivative products were used to assist in the remediation of the Deepwater Horizon spill.

In 2019 Universal Remediation and its assets including PRP were acquired by United Remediation Technology, LLC.
