= Myrtle Creek Municipal Airport =

- Myrtle Creek Municipal Airport, French Field
- IATA: none; ICAO: none; FAA LID: 16S

Summary
- Airport type: Public
- Operator: City of Myrtle Creek
- Location: Myrtle Creek, Oregon
- Elevation AMSL: 619 ft (189 m)
- Coordinates: 42°59′54.4220″N 123°18′34.23″W
- Interactive map of Myrtle Creek Municipal Airport

Runways
Direction	Length		Surface
Direction	ft	m	Surface
3/21	2,600	792	Asphalt

Myrtle Creek Municipal Airport (FAA LID: 16S) is a public airport located two miles (3.2 km) southwest of Myrtle Creek in Douglas County, Oregon, United States. It is located on approximately 87.26 acres, and is owned and operated by the City of Myrtle Creek. The airport is bordered by U.S. Interstate 5 to the west and the South Umpqua River.
