= Letitia Carson =

First African American to successfully make a land claim in Oregon

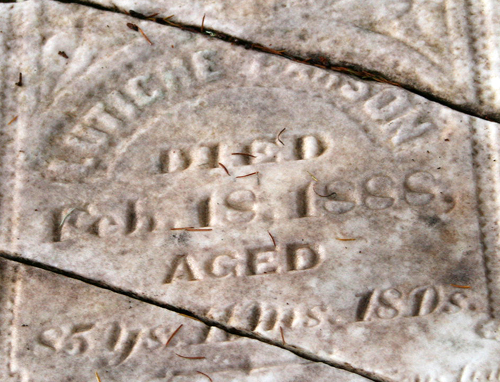
Gravestone of Letitia Carson

Letitia Carson was an Oregon pioneer and one of the first African Americans to be listed as living in Oregon according to the U.S. Federal Census. In fact, she was the only black woman to successfully make a land claim in Oregon under the Homestead Act of 1862. She was the inspiration for Jane Kirkpatrick's 2014 novel A Light In The Wilderness.

== Early life ==
Carson was born into slavery in Kentucky between 1814 and 1818. Little is known of her early life besides that some time before 1845, she arrived in Missouri. It is presumed that she was involved in the hemp or tobacco farming industries as a field hand, a house servant, or both. It is also presumed that she might have been either a Baptist or a Methodist and may have attended Sunday services in her enslaver's church, with an all-black congregation, or both.

== Life in Oregon ==
In 1845, she set out in a 6-month journey on the Oregon Trail for Oregon with David Carson, an Irish immigrant who owned land in Platte County and had become an American citizen in 1844. It is unclear whether Letitia was ever enslaved by David. However, by the time they began their journey to Oregon, he recognized her as a free person. On June 9, 1845, Carson gave birth to their daughter, Martha Jane somewhere along the South Platte River.

Upon their arrival, the Carsons staked a 640-acre land claim in the Soap Creek Valley, located in modern-day Benton County, Oregon. Government officials reduced the Carsons' land claim by half in 1850 to 320 acres since David and Letitia could not legally marry, as Letitia was black and the Donation Land Act provided up to 640 acres solely for married couples, in addition to black people at the time being ineligible to make a land claim in Oregon. On their homestead, Letita and David raised cattle, planted crops, and established an Orchard. They likely sold produce, dairy, and meat to travelers along the Applegate Trail. Letitia Carson gave birth to a son, Adam Andrew Jackson, in 1849. According to the 1850 U.S. Federal Census, Letitia and David lived in Benton, Oregon Territory, with their two children.

=== Trials over land ownership ===
In September 1852, David Carson died from an illness. When he died, he did not have a will, leading to Letitia and their children being excluded from his estate settlement, and their wealthy white neighbor Greenberry Smith to be named executor of his estate instead. Smith claimed that Carson and the children were slaves who "were themselves property and therefore could not be heirs to the estate." After her husband's death, Letita spent $104.87 to buy back some of her family's possessions from Greenberry, including bedding, cookware, and some cattle to survive. For her children's benefit, Carson filed a lawsuit and took Smith to court to recover an equitable portion of David's estate, stating that David Carson had promised "he would make me his sole heir or that he would give me his entire property" in the event of his death, even though this was not ever put into writing. One of Letita's nephews, Andrew J. Carson, and her husband's son from a previous relationship, David Jr., as well as some of her neighbors, were subpoenaed to testify in her lawsuit. She asked that the court award her $7,450 as compensation for her seven years of work on the Soap Creek Valley claim, "plus the value of livestock and other property to which she claimed she was entitled." On May 12, 1855, Carson was awarded $300 by a Benton County Jury, plus $229.50 to pay her court costs. On October 25, 1856, a federal court awarded her $1399.75 for the loss of her cattle. Although she won both of these lawsuits, her accomplishments were not acknowledged in the local press at the time. Notably, the all-white jury ruled in Letita's favor in the 1855 lawsuit.

During or after the federal trial, Carson moved with her children to the upper Cow Creek Valley of Douglas County, Oregon, where she worked as a midwife who was well known among community members. She is thought to have lived in Douglas County with the family of Hardy Eliff, for whom she also worked in addition to being a midwife.

Oregon became a state and adopted its 1857 Constitution in 1859, which stated that black people were banned from migrating to the area. The Constitution also enforced the ban on property ownership, voting rights, and the right to sue in court to black residents in the area. In 1862, President Abraham Lincoln signed the Homestead Act, and the law changed to not ban homesteaders based on race. On June 17, 1863, Carson then filed a 154-acre claim under the Homestead Act of 1862 on South Myrtle Creek in Douglas County, Oregon as a widow and single mother of two children Her claim was certified on October 1, 1869, by President Ulysses S. Grant. Her claim was one of the first 71 homestead claims to ever be certified in the United States, and she was most likely the first black woman to successfully file an Oregon claim under the act. Carson spent the rest of her life on her claim. A tributary to South Myrtle Creek near her claim is known as Letitia Creek. She built "a two-story house, a barn, [and] smokehouse" on the property, which also included a fruit orchard, which according to the 1870 Census lists her real estate and personal property value at $1,000 and $625, respectively.

Carson remarried to Narcisse Lavadour, the son of a French-Canadian fur trapper and a Walla Walla woman. They lived on the Douglas County homestead until 1886, before moving to the Umatilla Indian Reservation, where many of her descendants live today. Carson died in her early 70's, on February 2, 1888, and was buried at Stephens Cemetery in Myrtle Creek, Oregon. The Letitia Carson Pioneer Apple Tree was named after her by researchers who completed a cultural resource inventory of the property owned by Oregon State University.

=== Daughter Martha Jane Carson ===
On her journey from Missouri to Oregon in May 1845, Letitia Carson gave birth to her daughter, Martha Jane Carson, along the North Fork of the Platte River (present-day Nebraska). The family officially settled in Oregon in the fall.

Carson's daughter, Martha Jane, moved to the Umatilla Indian Reservation in 1886. On November 26, 1864, Martha gave birth to a daughter, Mary Alice Bingham, presumed to be the daughter of Solomon Bingham who also lived in Douglas County during this time. Martha had ten more children with her husband Narcisse Lavadour, whom she married on January 19, 1868; Narcisse's father was a retired Hudson's Bay Company employee and his mother was from the Walla Walla tribe. He claimed an allotment of land on the Umatilla Reservation. Martha and Narcisse's children were Agnes (1870–1941), Ira (1872–n.d.), Ada (1873–n.d.), Albert (1875–n.d.); Ida Ethel (1877–n.d.), Fred (1879–n.d.), Millie (1883–n.d.), Nelson (1886–n.d.), Grace (1888–n.d.), and Thomas (1890–n.d.). A year after Narcisse's death in 1893, Martha married Charles Carpenter. After divorcing him in 1910, Martha died on July 17, 1911, at the age of 66. She was buried at the Athena Cemetery in Umatilla County, Oregon.

=== Son Adam "Andrew Jackson" Carson ===
Carson's son, Adam “Andrew Jackson”, farmed in the Canyonville area and was known for his skill as horse trainer. He never married and lived in Douglas County nearly his entire life until his death on September 14, 1922, at the age of 73. He was buried at the Stephens Cemetery, Myrtle Creek, Douglas County, Oregon, next to his mother.

== Legacy ==
Carson is the heroine of Jane Kirkpatrick's 2014 historical fiction novel, A Light In The Wilderness. The novel chronicles her relationship with David Carson, journey to Oregon, and legal battle with Greenberry Smith.

An elementary school in Corvallis, Oregon was renamed in honor of Letitia Carson in 2021.
