= Lotikipi Basin Aquifer =

The Lotikipi Basin Aquifer is a large aquifer in the northwest region of Kenya containing 200 billion cubic meters of saline water and covers an area of 4,164 km^{2}. The aquifer, discovered in September 2013, is nine times the size of any other aquifer in Kenya and has the potential to supply the population with enough fresh water to last 70 years or indefinitely if properly managed.

== Discovery ==
The aquifer was discovered by Radar Technologies, in conjunction with the Kenyan government and UNESCO, using satellite, radar, and geological maps along with seismic techniques typically used to locate oil reserves.

== Development ==
The aquifer is located 300 meters below the surface and extends near the borders of South Sudan, Ethiopia, and Uganda, an area sparsely populated and prone to conflict due to the scarcity of resources in the area. In such a remote area, tapping an aquifer this deep underground and maintaining the boreholes poses a technological challenge to the Kenyan government.

== Testing ==
In February 2015, the Kenyan government announced that the first tests of the aquifer had found the water too salty for human consumption. It would need to be desalinated using reverse osmosis to be fit. New test phases were announced in June 2016 with a proposed budget of KShs. 5 billion.
