= Space Foundation =

American space advocacy organization

- Formation: 1983
- Headquarters: Colorado Springs, Colorado
- Website: https://www.spacefoundation.org/

The Space Foundation is an American nonprofit organization, that advocates for the global space industry through space awareness activities, educational programs, and major industry events. Founded in 1983, it is based in Colorado Springs, Colorado, with additional offices in Washington, D.C..

== Activities ==
The Space Foundation delivers K-12 student programs in laboratory, classroom and after-school settings. It hosts the annual Space Symposium in Colorado Springs, featuring presentations and panels that provide insight into space developments and the latest on critical industry issues.

The symposium includes an annual fundraiser called "Yuri's Night", named in honour of Soviet cosmonaut Yuri Gagarin. In 2022, the foundation renamed the fundraiser as "A Celebration of Space: Discover What's Next" due to the invasion of Ukraine by Russia.

== Awards ==
=== General James E. Hill Lifetime Space Achievement Award ===
The General James E. Hill Lifetime Space Achievement Award is the highest honor bestowed by the Space Foundation, presented annually. The award recognizes outstanding individuals who have distinguished themselves through lifetime contributions to the welfare or betterment of humankind through the exploration, development and use of space, or the use of space technology, information, themes or resources in academic, cultural, industrial or other pursuits of broad benefit to humanity. Recipients of the award include:

Year	Recipient
2025	Kathryn Sullivan
2024	Martin Faga
2023	Daniel Goldin
2022	Joanne M. Maguire
2021	Patti Grace Smith
2020	Gene Kranz
2019	Thomas P. Stafford
2018	Christopher Columbus "Chris" Kraft Jr.
2017	Piers Sellers
2016	VADM Richard H. Truly, USN (Ret.)
2015	Jean-Jacques Dordain, Director General of the European Space Agency (ESA)
2014	A. Thomas Young
2013	NASA Astronauts Neil Armstrong and Sally Ride
2012	General Thomas S. Moorman Jr., USAF (Retired)
2011	Charles Elachi, Ph.D.
2010	Captain John W. Young, USN (Retired)
2009	The Honorable Peter B. Teets
2008	Hans Mark, Ph.D.
2007	Simon Ramo, Ph.D.
2006	Buzz Aldrin, Ph.D.
2005	The Honorable Edward C. Aldridge Jr.
2004	General Bernard A. Schriever, USAF (Retired)
2003	Captain James A. Jim Lovell Jr., USN (Retired)
2002	Norman R. Augustine

=== Alan Shepard Technology in Education Award ===
The Space Foundation, in conjunction with the Astronauts Memorial Foundation (AMF) and the National Aeronautics and Space Administration (NASA), annually presents the Alan Shepard Technology in Education Award to recognize outstanding contributions to creative and innovative use of technology in education by K-12 educators or district-level education personnel. Winners of the Alan Shepard Technology in Education Award include:

Year	Winner
2023	Rachel Harrington
2022	Dan Saldana
2021	N/A
2020	Kaci Heins
2019	Jill Gilford
2018	Diego Martinez
2017	Ashlie Blackstone Smith
2016	Margaret Rhule Baguio
2015	June Scobee Rodgers, Ph.D.
2014	Lynne F. Zielinski
2013	Daniel R. Newmyer, a science and math teacher for Center High School in rural southern Colorado.
2012	Dr. Cynthia Waters, director of aviation for The Aviation Academy at T.W. Andrews High School in High Point, N.C.
2011	Charles County (Md.) Public Schools Superintendent James E. Richmond
2010	Allen V. Robnett
2009	Ricardo V. Soria
2008	Kevin L. Simmons
2007	Luther W. Richardson
2006	Kathy R. Brandon
2005	Ronald F. Dantowitz
2004	Charles Geach
2003	Brian Copes
2002	Thomas F. Hunt, Frank E. Waller
2001	Lori Byrnes

=== Douglas S. Morrow Public Outreach Award ===
The Space Foundation annually presents the Douglas S. Morrow Public Outreach Award in memory of Douglas S. Morrow, Academy Award-winning writer and producer, space advocate and former Space Foundation Board Member, to an individual or organization who has made significant contributions to the public awareness and understanding of space programs. Winners of the Douglas S. Morrow Public Outreach Award include:

Year	Winner
2025	Emily Calandrelli
2024	Barbara Morgan
2023	United States Postal Service (USPS)
2022	Virgin Galactic, Blue Origin and SpaceX
2021	Bill Ingalls
2020	Smithsonian Institution's National Air and Space Museum (NASM)
2019	National Space Council and its Chair, U.S. Vice President Mike Pence
2018	Margot Lee Shetterly
2017	DigitalGlobe and The Associated Press
2016	Andy Weir, author
2015	NASA/Industry Exploration Flight Test 1 team
2014	Col. Chris Hadfield (Ret.), former Canadian astronaut
2013	Bill Nye the Science Guy and chief executive officer of the Planetary Society
2012	NASA Social Media Team
2011	Space Journalists Jay Barbree (NBC News), Marcia Dunn (The Associated Press) and Bill Harwood (CBS News)
2010	Leonard Nimoy
2009	Neil deGrasse Tyson, Ph.D.
2008	Delaware North Companies Parks & Resorts
2007	Colonel Eileen M. Collins, USAF (Retired)
2006	Tom Hanks
2005	The Ansari X-Prize Foundation
2004	Life magazine
2003	Robert T. McCall
2002	Gene Roddenberry and Majel Barrett Roddenberry
2001	Popular Science Magazine
2000	Space Awareness Alliance
1999	The Crew of Space Shuttle Mission STS-95
1998	NASA's Jet Propulsion Laboratory
1997	The Cable News Network (CNN)
1996	The Apollo 13 film team
1995	Discovery Communications, Inc.

=== Space Achievement Award ===
The Space Foundation's Space Achievement Award recognizes individuals or organizations for space achievement, a breakthrough space technology or program or other achievements representing critical milestones in the evolution of space exploration and development. Winners of the Space Achievement Award include:

Year	Winner
2025	SpaceX Starship Mission Team
2024	European Space Agency
2023	NASA's Double Asteroid Redirection Test (DART) team
2022	International Astronautical Federation
2021	United States Space Force (USSF)
2020	International Space Station partners
2019	Peter Wilhelm, former director, Naval Center for Space Technology Virgin Galactic and The Spaceship Company
2018	Space Security and Defense Program
2017	The Space Mission of Scott Kelly and Mikhail Kornienko
2016	SpaceX
2015	Boeing X-37 Team
2014	U.S. Air Force GPS team
2013	National Oceanic and Atmospheric Administration
2012	Dr. Junichiro Kawaguchi, JAXA
2011	SpaceX and Télécoms Sans Frontières
2010	Hubble Space Telescope Repair Mission team
2009	China's Shenzhou 7 Mission
2008	United States Air Force
2007	Bigelow Aerospace
2006	The U.S. Titan Launch Vehicle Team: Lockheed Martin, United States Air Force, The Aerospace Corporation, NASA
2005	SpaceShipOne team
2004	Ariane 4 launch team
2003	U.S. Air Force Evolved Expendable Launch Vehicle Team; Lockheed Martin Evolved Expendable Launch Vehicle Team; The Boeing Company Evolved Expendable Launch Vehicle Team
2002	NASA/Industry Galileo space probe team and the men and women of United States Space Command and its component organizations
2001	Hubble Space Telescope team
2000	Sea Launch
1999	NASA-Boeing International Space Station team
1998	General Thomas S. Moorman Jr., USAF (Retired)
1997	Captain James Jim Lovell, USN (Retired)
1996	American Astronautical Society
1995	Air University (United States Air Force)

=== John L. Jack, Swigert Jr., Award for Space Exploration ===
The John L. "Jack" Swigert Jr., Award for Space Exploration recognizes extraordinary accomplishments by a company, space agency or consortium of organizations in the realm of space exploration and discovery. The award is in memory of astronaut John L. 'Jack' Swigert Jr., one of the inspirations for creating the Space Foundation. Winners of the John L. Jack Swigert Jr., Award for Space Exploration include:

Year	Winner
2025	Polaris Dawn Mission
2024	Chandrayaan-3
2023	James Webb Space Telescope team
2022	NASA and the University of Arizona OSIRIS-REx team
2021	NASA JPL Mars Ingenuity helicopter team
2020	NASA JPL InSight-Mars Cube One
2019	NASA Dawn mission
2018	Cassini mission team
2017	No award
2016	Pluto New Horizons exploration team
2015	Rosetta comet exploration team
2014	No award
2013	NASA Mars Science Laboratory mission team
2012	NASA Kepler Mission
2011	No award
2010	The Lunar Crater Observation and Sensing Satellite (LCROSS) mission team
2009	NASA's Phoenix Mars Lander team
2008	Japan Aerospace Exploration Agency
2007	The California Institute of Technology
2006	Buzz Aldrin, Ph.D.
2005	NASA's Mars Exploration Team from Jet Propulsion Laboratory
2004	President George W. Bush

== Space Technology Hall of Fame ==
The Space Technology Hall of Fame was created in 1988 by the Space Foundation with cooperation from NASA and is administered by the Space Foundation. The foundation annually honors groups and individuals that, according to the organization, "transform technology originally developed for space exploration into products that help improve the quality of life here on Earth".

Year	Inductee
2018	Evinrude/BRP MSFC-398 and Miniaturized Laser Communication Terminals by Mynaric and DLR
2017	ActivePure RCI and Florikan E.S.A. SNR Fertilizer
2016	Medtronic LaRC S-I and WATEX
2015	Chronos Vision Technology and Seismic Damper Technology
2014	International Cospas-Sarsat Programme and NeuroArm-Symbis Space Robotics
2013	GATR Inflatable Satellite Communication System a portable, rapidly deployed, inflatable antenna that targets a geostationary satellite to establish critical communications links and Mediphan DistanceDoc and MedRecorder, compact low-power ultrasound devices that can be used as a diagnostic tool where large scanning equipment is impractical.
2012	Flexible Aerogel (Aspen Aerogels, Aspen Systems and NASA Kennedy Space Center) and high-resolution optical sensing fire detection (FireWatch system from the German Aerospace Center (DLR) and IQ Wireless)
2011	Commercial Earth-Imaging Satellites (GeoEye and DigitalGlobe) and Intrifuge CellXpansion (NASA Johnson Space Center, Regenetech and Synthecon)
2010	Eagle Eyes and Digital Fly-By-Wire
2009	Aerodynamic Vehicle Design and Micro Algae Nutritional Supplements
2008	ArterioVision, Petroleum Remediation Product and ResQPOD
2007	Umpqua Research Company, Emulsified Zero-Valent Iron and Microbial Check Valve
2006	iRobot PackBot Tactical Mobile Robot and Novariant AutoFarm RTK AutoSteer
2005	Hyperspectral Imaging Systems, NanoCeram Superfilters, InnerVue Diagnostic Scope System, InnerVue Diagnostic Scope System and Outlast Technologies, Inc. Smart Fabric Technology
2004	Multi-Junction (MJ) Space Solar Cells, LADARVision 4000, Precision Global Positioning System (GPS) Software and MedStar Monitoring System
2003	Cochlear Implant, Virtual Window, VisiScreen (Ocular Screening System, Monolithic Microwave Integrated Circuit Technology, Humanitarian Demining Device and Digital Latching Valve
2002	Satellite Radio Technology
2001	Data Matrix Symbology, Video Image Stabilization and Registration (VISAR) and Quantum Well Infrared Photodetectors (QWIP)
2000	X-1R Advanced Lubricants, DirecTV and Light-Emitting Diodes for medical applications
1999	Heart Defibrillator Energy Source, Miniature Accelerometer, Active Pixel Sensor and DeBakey Blood Pump
1998	Global Positioning System and Tempur Foam
1997	ACTS Gigabit Satellite Network and Stereotactic Breast Biopsy Technology
1996	Radiant Barrier, Anti-Shock Trousers and Fire-Resistant Aircraft Seats
1995	Parawings or Hang Gliders and Anti-Corrosion Coatings
1994	Excimer Laser Angioplasty System and Digital Image Processing - Medical Applications
1993	Physiological Monitoring Instrumentation and Liquid-Cooled Garments
1992	Earth Resources Laboratory Applications Software and Direct Readout Satellite System
1991	Automatic Implantable Cardiovertor Defibrillator and PMR-15 Polymide Resin
1990	Heat Pipe Systems & Safety Grooving
1989	Cordless Tools, Scratch Resistant Lenses and Fabric Roof Structures
1988	Improved Firefighter's Breathing System, NASA Structural Analysis Computer Software, Sewage Treatment With Water Hyacinths, Programmable Implantable Medication System and Power Factor Controller.
