= South Umpqua River =

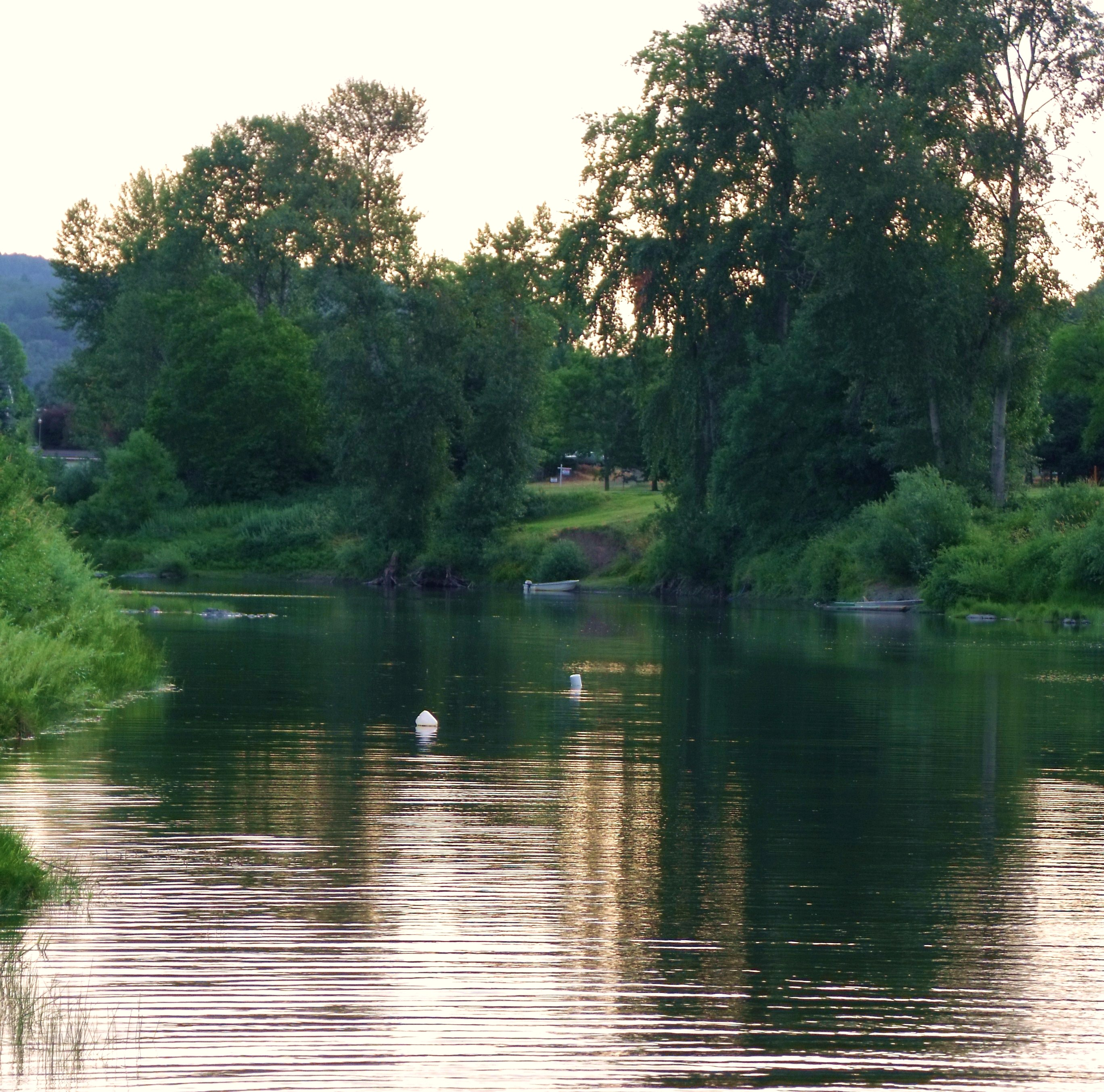
- The South Umpqua near its confluence with the North Umpqua

- Location of the mouth of the South Umpqua River in Oregon
- Etymology: Indigenous people's name for the region near the river

Location
- Country: United States
- State: Oregon
- County: Douglas

Physical characteristics
- Source: Confluence of forks near Fish Mountain
  - location: Northwest of Crater Lake, Cascade Range
  - coordinates: 43°06′26″N 122°35′22″W
  - elevation: 2,009 ft (612 m)
- Mouth: Confluence with North Umpqua River
  - location: Near Roseburg
  - coordinates: 43°16′04″N 123°26′46″W
  - elevation: 361 ft (110 m)
- Length: 115 mi (185 km)
- Basin size: 1,800 sq mi (4,700 km^{2})
- Discharge
  - location: near Winston, about 20 miles (32 km) from the mouth
  - average: 2,747 cu ft/s (77.8 m^{3}/s)
  - minimum: 16 cu ft/s (0.45 m^{3}/s)
  - maximum: 125,000 cu ft/s (3,500 m^{3}/s)

The South Umpqua River is a tributary of the Umpqua River, approximately 115 miles (185 km) long, in southwestern Oregon in the United States. It drains part of the Cascade Range east of Roseburg. The river passes through a remote canyon in its upper reaches then emerges in the populated South Umpqua Valley east of Canyonville.

== Course ==
It rises in the high Cascades north of Fish Mountain, formed by the confluence of two short forks in eastern Douglas County approximately 20 miles (32 km) northwest of Crater Lake. It flows generally southwest through a remote canyon in the Umpqua National Forest to Tiller, then west past Milo and Days Creek. It emerges into the South Umpqua Valley at Canyonville, passing under Interstate 5 and flowing north along the highway past Tri-City, Myrtle Creek, and Roseburg. It joins the North Umpqua from the south to form the Umpqua approximately 6 miles (10 km) northwest of Roseburg.

It receives Cow Creek from the south approximately 5 miles (8 km) southwest of Tri-City.

One of the main tributaries of the South Umpqua River is Cow Creek, which also flows west from the Cascade Mountains, but South of Canyonville. On its westward journey, the Cow Creek more or less runs parallel to the South Umpqua River, with an east–west mountain ridge separating them.

Cow Creek runs further west, swings around north and makes its confluence with the South Umpqua River at Tri City. The Cow Creek has such a significant flow that it is almost a toss-up as to which should be called the river and which the creek.

== History ==
For centuries the South Umpqua River and Cow Creek were the homelands for the Umpqua Indians. However, gold was discovered on the South Umpqua River in 1848 causing an influx of gold miners and the homesteaders found the rich agricultural land of the area desirable.

In 1853 a treaty was negotiated between Joel Palmer, Superintendent of Indians, representing the Government of the United States and Chief Quintioosan and others, representing the Cow Creek Band of the Umpqua people. Although the US Government ratified the treaty, the terms agreed upon in the treaty were never honored.

Beginning in the 1820s, trappers and traders of the Hudson's Bay Company began using the South Umpqua River valley to move along what became known as the Siskiyou Trail. The Siskiyou Trail was based on existing Indian footpaths, and became an important link between the Pacific Northwest and California's Central Valley.

In 1846, spurred by the desire to create a safer trail for emigrants to use to reach the Willamette Valley, Jesse and Lindsay Applegate, Levi Scott, and 13 other companions explored a new route through the valley that connected the southern Willamette Valley with Goose Lake in Northern California. This trail became known as the Applegate Trail, and linked up with the northernmost branch of the California Trail.

Interstate 5 closely follows the original Siskiyou Trail route through the valley today.

== Economic importance ==
The South Umpqua River valley became an important timber-producing region in the 20th century. In the 21st century, tourism became important to the South Umpqua Valley.

The Cow Creek Band of the Umpqua Tribe of Indians received a land claims settlement from the US federal government in 1988.

Using the land claims settlement of $1.5 million, the Cow Creek Band operates a casino, hotel, convention center, and other businesses in Canyonville on the South Umpqua River.

South Umpqua Falls near Tiller is the site of a popular picnic area and United States Forest Service campground near the river. Open from May 1 to October 31, the campground has 16 sites suitable for tents or trailers.

== See also ==
- List of rivers of Oregon
- List of longest streams of Oregon

== Works cited ==
- McArthur, Lewis A., and McArthur, Lewis L. (2003) [1928]. Oregon Geographic Names, 7th ed. Portland: Oregon Historical Society Press. ISBN 0-87595-277-1.
