= Myrtle Creek, Oregon =

- City
- Myrtle Creek City Hall
- Nickname: Gateway to the 100 Valleys of the Umpqua
- Location in Oregon
- Coordinates: 43°00′10″N 123°17′50″W
- Country: United States
- State: Oregon
- County: Douglas
- Incorporated: 1893

Government
  - Mayor: Luke Dillon

Area
  - Total: 2.50 sq mi (6.47 km^{2})
  - Land: 2.50 sq mi (6.47 km^{2})
  - Water: 0 sq mi (0.00 km^{2})
- Elevation: 610 ft (190 m)

Population (2020)
  - Total: 3,481
  - Density: 1,394.1/sq mi (538.25/km^{2})
- Time zone: UTC-8 (Pacific)
  - Summer (DST): UTC-7 (Pacific)
- ZIP code: 97457
- Area code: 541
- FIPS code: 41-50950
- GNIS feature ID: 2411204
- Website: cityofmyrtlecreek.com

Myrtle Creek is a city in Douglas County, Oregon, United States. The population was 3,481 at the 2020 census.

== History ==
Myrtle Creek was named for the groves of Oregon myrtle (also known as California laurel), growing nearby. A Myrtle Creek post office was established in 1854 with Lazarus Wright as postmaster. In 1862, Wright sold the land for a town site to John Hall, who laid out Myrtle Creek in 1865.

In 1868, Letitia Carson received a certificate of ownership for her homestead claim near Myrtle Creek, making her one of the first 71 people in the country to secure a claim under the Homestead Act. She was the only Black woman to do so in Oregon.

The city has two covered bridges. The first, Neal Lane Bridge, carries Neal Lane Road over South Myrtle Creek on the southeastern outskirts of the city. It was built in 1939. At 42 feet (13 m) long, it is one of the shortest covered bridges in Oregon and the only one with a kingpost truss.

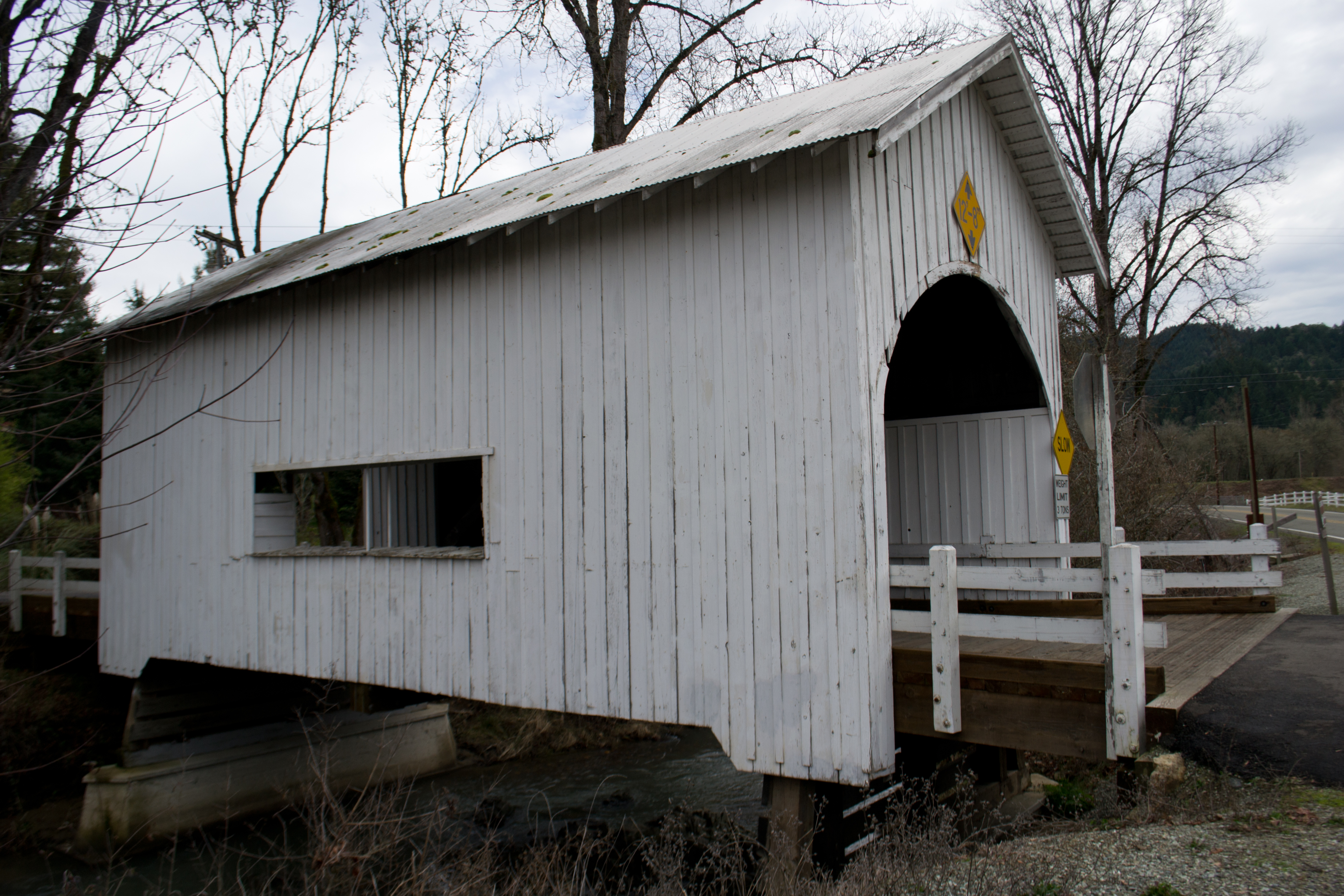
The Neal Lane Covered Bridge.

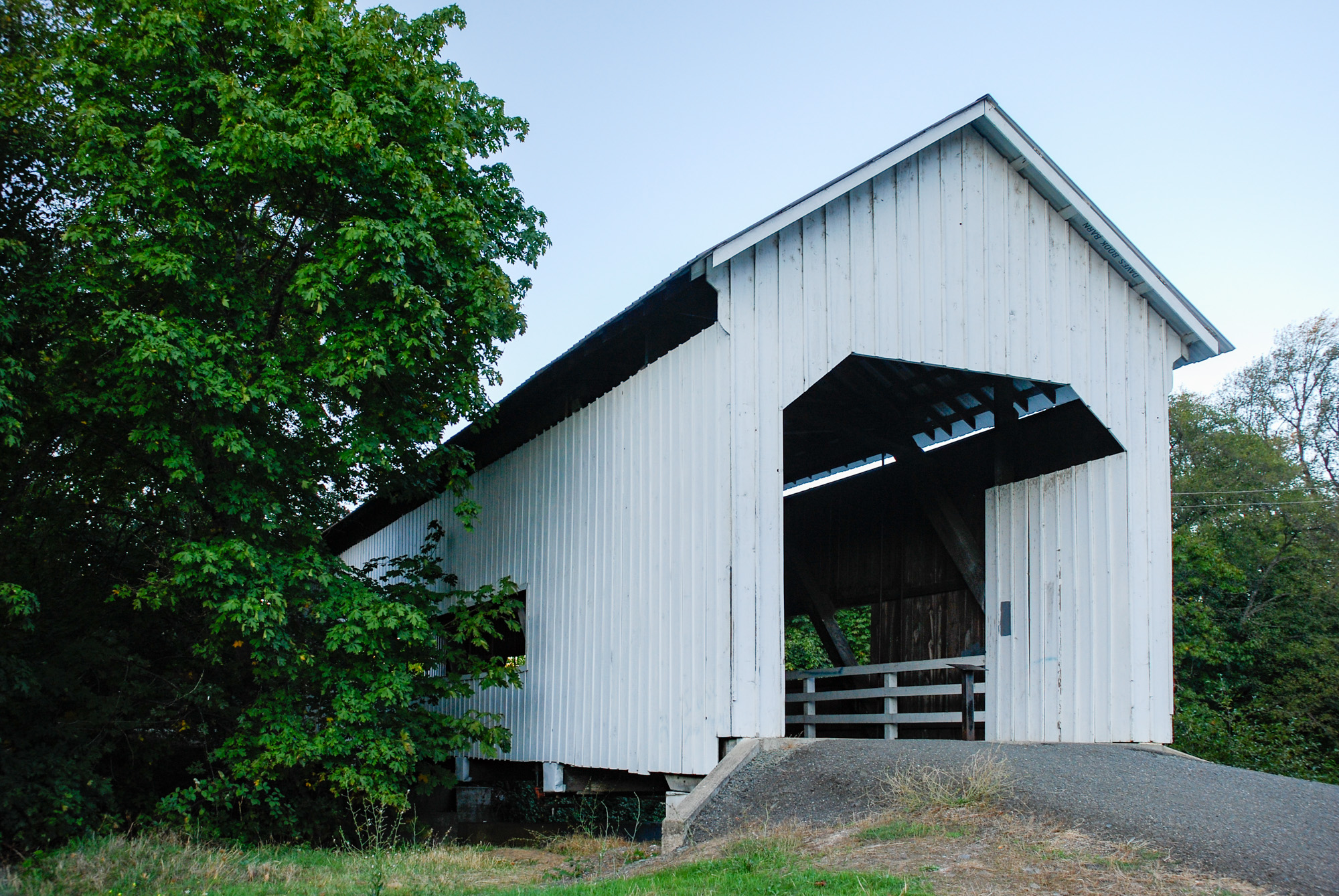
The Horse Creek Covered Bridge.

In 1990, the City of Myrtle Creek acquired timbers from the former Horse Creek Bridge in Lane County and used them to build another covered bridge over Myrtle Creek. The bridge connects a parking area to the city's Mill Site Park.

== Geography ==
Bridge over the South Umpqua in Myrtle Creek.

Myrtle Creek lies along Interstate 5 south of Roseburg and slightly north of Tri City and Canyonville in southern Douglas County. Two streams, North Myrtle Creek and South Myrtle Creek, merge at the city to form Myrtle Creek, a short tributary of the South Umpqua River.

According to the United States Census Bureau, the city has a total area of 2.51 square miles (6.50 km^{2}), all of it land.

=== Climate ===
This region experiences warm (but not hot) and dry summers, with no average monthly temperatures above 71.6 °F (22.0 °C). According to the Köppen Climate Classification system, Myrtle Creek has a warm-summer Mediterranean climate, abbreviated "Csb" on climate maps.

== Demographics ==
Historical population
Census	Pop.	Note	%±
1880	119		—
1900	189		—
1910	429		127.0%
1920	385		−10.3%
1930	401		4.2%
1940	441		10.0%
1950	1,781		303.9%
1960	2,231		25.3%
1970	2,733		22.5%
1980	3,365		23.1%
1990	3,063		−9.0%
2000	3,419		11.6%
2010	3,439		0.6%
2020	3,481		1.2%
U.S. Decennial Census

=== 2020 census ===
As of the 2020 census, Myrtle Creek had a population of 3,481 and a median age of 44.3 years. 21.1% of residents were under the age of 18 and 24.4% were 65 years of age or older. For every 100 females there were 96.1 males, and for every 100 females age 18 and over there were 95.0 males.

97.0% of residents lived in urban areas, while 3.0% lived in rural areas.

There were 1,442 households in Myrtle Creek, of which 28.8% had children under the age of 18 living in them. Of all households, 42.1% were married-couple households, 20.4% were households with a male householder and no spouse or partner present, and 27.9% were households with a female householder and no spouse or partner present. About 28.0% of all households were made up of individuals and 16.2% had someone living alone who was 65 years of age or older.

There were 1,544 housing units, of which 6.6% were vacant. Among occupied housing units, 61.5% were owner-occupied and 38.5% were renter-occupied. The homeowner vacancy rate was 2.4% and the rental vacancy rate was 4.8%.

Racial composition as of the 2020 census
Race	Number	Percent
White	3,011	86.5%
Black or African American	8	0.2%
American Indian and Alaska Native	83	2.4%
Asian	37	1.1%
Native Hawaiian and Other Pacific Islander	6	0.2%
Some other race	29	0.8%
Two or more races	307	8.8%
Hispanic or Latino (of any race)	184	5.3%

=== 2010 census ===
As of the 2010 census, there were 3,439 people, 1,382 households, and 930 families living in the city. The population density was 1,370.1 inhabitants per square mile (529.0/km^{2}). There were 1,521 housing units at an average density of 606.0 per square mile (234.0/km^{2}). The racial makeup of the city was 90.7% White, 0.3% African American, 2.1% Native American, 0.8% Asian, 0.1% Pacific Islander, 1.2% from other races, and 4.9% from two or more races. Hispanic or Latino of any race were 4.3% of the population.

There were 1,382 households, of which 31.2% had children under the age of 18 living with them, 47.5% were married couples living together, 14.3% had a female householder with no husband present, 5.6% had a male householder with no wife present, and 32.7% were non-families. 26.4% of all households were made up of individuals, and 13.7% had someone living alone who was 65 years of age or older. The average household size was 2.46 and the average family size was 2.92.

The median age in the city was 40.5 years. 23.3% of residents were under the age of 18; 8.4% were between the ages of 18 and 24; 24.2% were from 25 to 44; 26.6% were from 45 to 64; and 17.7% were 65 years of age or older. The gender makeup of the city was 49.1% male and 50.9% female.

=== 2000 census ===
As of the 2000 census, there were 3,419 people, 1,339 households, and 914 families living in the city. The population density was 1,952.5 inhabitants per square mile (753.9/km^{2}). There were 1,437 housing units at an average density of 820.6 per square mile (316.8/km^{2}). The racial makeup of the city was 93.45% White, 0.15% African American, 2.14% Native American, 0.88% Asian, 0.67% from other races, and 2.72% from two or more races. Hispanic or Latino of any race were 3.07% of the population.

There were 1,339 households, out of which 34.0% had children under the age of 18 living with them, 50.9% were married couples living together, 12.6% had a female householder with no husband present, and 31.7% were non-families. 26.0% of all households were made up of individuals, and 12.5% had someone living alone who was 65 years of age or older. The average household size was 2.55 and the average family size was 3.06.

In the city, the population was spread out, with 28.5% under the age of 18, 8.7% from 18 to 24, 25.7% from 25 to 44, 22.3% from 45 to 64, and 14.8% who were 65 years of age or older. The median age was 36 years. For every 100 females, there were 91.9 males. For every 100 females age 18 and over, there were 84.1 males.

The median income for a household in the city was $30,658, and the median income for a family was $40,000. Males had a median income of $30,559 versus $22,102 for females. The per capita income for the city was $14,813. About 14.4% of families and 17.4% of the population were below the poverty line, including 26.9% of those under age 18 and 13.5% of those age 65 or over.

== Transportation ==
- Myrtle Creek Municipal Airport

== Notable people ==
- Letitia Carson (c. 1814–1911), pioneer and the only black woman to successfully make a land claim in Oregon
- Jeff Merkley (born 1956), U.S. senator for Oregon
- Susan Morgan (born 1949), member of the Oregon House of Representatives and Douglas County commissioner

== See also ==
- South Umpqua High School
- Umpqua Research Company
