= National Register of Historic Places listings in Douglas County, Oregon =

Location of Douglas County in Oregon

This list presents the full set of buildings, structures, objects, sites, or districts designated on the National Register of Historic Places in Douglas County, Oregon, United States, and offers brief descriptive information about each of them. The National Register recognizes places of national, state, or local historic significance across the United States. Out of over 90,000 National Register sites nationwide, Oregon is home to over 2,000, and 52 of those are found in Douglas County.

This National Park Service list is complete through NPS recent listings posted October 9, 2026.

== Current listings ==
	Name on the Register	Image	Date listed	Location	City or town	Description
1	35-DO-130–Tahkenitch Landing Site	35-DO-130–Tahkenitch Landing Site	June 10, 2003 (#01000132)	Address restricted	Gardiner vicinity	Stratified remains up to 2 meters (6 ft 7 in) deep show this archaeological site has served various functions including shell midden and probably village over a history spanning 7000 to 8000 years. It was the first site on the Oregon coast to yield cultural remains older than about 3000 BP, and as such is one of the most significant sites on the Pacific coast of North America.
2	Charles Applegate House	Charles Applegate House	March 17, 1975 (#75001583)	512 Old Applegate Road; 43°36′40″N 123°16′22″W	Yoncalla	
3	Baimbridge–Kanipe Farmstead Historic District	Baimbridge–Kanipe Farmstead Historic District	January 29, 2008 (#07001506)	16513 Elkhead Rd. 43°29′00″N 123°13′16″W	Oakland	
4	Henry Brown House	Henry Brown House	October 30, 1979 (#79002057)	19521 Highway 38; 43°38′49″N 123°38′58″W	Elkton	
5	Will Q. Brown House and Wash House	Will Q. Brown House and Wash House	September 10, 1987 (#87001539)	274 Main St. 42°56′52″N 123°21′50″W	Riddle	
6	Canyonville Methodist Church	Canyonville Methodist Church	April 5, 1984 (#84002983)	2nd and Pine Sts. 42°55′38″N 123°16′49″W	Canyonville	
7	China Ditch	China Ditch	May 22, 1991 (#91000616)	Upper reaches of N. Myrtle Cr. 43°08′45″N 123°07′55″W	Myrtle Creek	
8	Nathaniel Curry House	Nathaniel Curry House	November 25, 1983 (#83004166)	1458 Quail Lane; 43°15′50″N 123°25′56″W	Roseburg	
9	Charles D. Drain Jr. House	Charles D. Drain Jr. House	December 12, 1978 (#78002286)	500 S. Main St. 43°39′31″N 123°18′43″W	Drain	
10	English Settlement School	English Settlement School	September 4, 2007 (#07000924)	17455 Elkhead Rd. 43°28′20″N 123°13′27″W	Oakland	
11	First Presbyterian Church of Roseburg	First Presbyterian Church of Roseburg	July 28, 1988 (#88001162)	823 SE Lane Ave. 43°12′25″N 123°20′45″W	Roseburg	
12	Creed Floed House	Creed Floed House	December 31, 1974 (#74001684)	544 SE Douglas St. 43°12′43″N 123°20′44″W	Roseburg	
13	Gardiner Historic District	Gardiner Historic District	January 31, 1994 (#93000003)	Roughly bounded by 3rd, Camp, 2nd, Pitt, Spring, Front and Garden Sts. 43°43′49″N 124°06′36″W	Gardiner	
14	Glide Ranger Station	Glide Ranger Station	April 8, 1986 (#86000820)	121 Glide Loop Drive; 43°17′52″N 123°06′02″W	Glide	
15	Judge James Watson Hamilton House	Judge James Watson Hamilton House	February 21, 1997 (#97000141)	759 SE Kane St. 43°12′23″N 123°20′36″W	Roseburg	
16	Hershberger Mountain Lookout	Hershberger Mountain Lookout	December 29, 2000 (#00000507)	Approximately 7 miles (11 km) north of Union Cr. 43°02′01″N 122°27′18″W	Prospect vicinity	
17	Howell–Kohlhagen House	Howell–Kohlhagen House	July 28, 1988 (#88001145)	848 SE Jackson St. 43°12′24″N 123°20′46″W	Roseburg	
18	Kohlhagen Building	Kohlhagen Building	June 13, 1997 (#97000589)	630 SE Jackson St. 43°12′31″N 123°20′41″W	Roseburg	
19	Laurelwood Historic District	Laurelwood Historic District	October 16, 1990 (#90001521)	Roughly bounded by the S. Umpqua R., Laurelwood Ct., and Bowden Ave. 43°12′55″N 123°21′03″W	Roseburg	
20	Methodist Episcopal Church South	Methodist Episcopal Church South	June 6, 1985 (#85001179)	809 SE Main St. 43°12′24″N 123°20′41″W	Roseburg	
21	Mill–Pine Neighborhood Historic District	Mill–Pine Neighborhood Historic District	June 20, 1985 (#85001348)	Roughly bounded by Short St., Mosher Ave., Stephens St. and Rice Ave. 43°12′13″N 123°21′07″W	Roseburg	Beginning in 1872, this neighborhood of modest homes developed to house employees of the adjacent railroad and the service and retail workers who served them. Physical evolution of the district largely ceased after the Southern Pacific moved its operational base from Roseburg to Eugene in 1927, leaving an unusually cohesive example of a working-class residential neighborhood of the late 19th and early 20th centuries. A boundary decrease was approved September 26, 2011.
22	Miller's Mountain House	Miller's Mountain House	October 25, 1984 (#84000129)	1195 Roberts Mountain Rd. 43°07′14″N 123°22′55″W	Roseburg	
23	Milo Academy Bridge	Milo Academy Bridge	November 29, 1979 (#79002055)	Southeast of Days Creek; 42°56′07″N 123°02′20″W	Days Creek	
24	Dr. Robert R. and Mary Helen Mooers House	Dr. Robert R. and Mary Helen Mooers House	June 25, 2018 (#100002632)	1247 SE Kane St. 43°12′06″N 123°20′42″W	Roseburg	
25	C. E. Moyer Nurseries Property	C. E. Moyer Nurseries Property	July 22, 1988 (#88001114)	8374 Old Hwy. 99 S. 43°06′43″N 123°25′00″W	Winston	
26	Oakland Historic District	Oakland Historic District	March 30, 1979 (#79002058)	Roughly bounded by Chestnut, 1st, Cedar, and 8th Sts. 43°25′21″N 123°17′51″W	Oakland	
27	Oregon State Soldier's Home Hospital	Oregon State Soldier's Home Hospital	March 7, 2012 (#12000079)	1624 W. Harvard Avenue; 43°12′50″N 123°22′04″W	Roseburg	
28	Moses Parrott House	Moses Parrott House	November 6, 1980 (#80003313)	1772 SE Jackson St. 43°11′55″N 123°21′07″W	Roseburg	
28	Pass Creek Covered Bridge	Pass Creek Covered Bridge	October 14, 2026 (#100013522)	W A Avenue; 43°39′38″N 123°19′00″W	Drain	
29	Rice Brothers and Adams Building	Rice Brothers and Adams Building	August 11, 1983 (#83002149)	136 N. Main St. 43°01′30″N 123°17′23″W	Myrtle Creek	
30	Napoleon Rice House	Napoleon Rice House	December 9, 1981 (#81000482)	709 SE Kane St. 43°12′26″N 123°20′35″W	Roseburg	
31	Roseburg Downtown Historic District	Roseburg Downtown Historic District	June 18, 2003 (#02000661)	Roughly bounded by SP tracks, Deer Creek, Fowler, Chadwick, Kane & Mosher Sts. 43°12′34″N 123°20′38″W	Roseburg	
32	Roseburg Oregon National Guard Armory	Roseburg Oregon National Guard Armory	May 27, 1993 (#93000447)	1034 SE Oak St. 43°12′31″N 123°20′34″W	Roseburg	
33	Roseburg Veterans Administration Hospital Historic District	Roseburg Veterans Administration Hospital Historic District	January 29, 2013 (#12001247)	913 NW Garden Valley Boulevard; 43°13′27″N 123°22′02″W	Roseburg	
34	Bernard Pitzer Smith House	Bernard Pitzer Smith House	August 25, 1988 (#88001313)	15892 Old Hwy. 99 S. 43°03′43″N 123°21′19″W	Myrtle Creek	
35	Henry Clay Smith House	Henry Clay Smith House	June 27, 1997 (#97000585)	275 Winston Section Rd. 43°07′53″N 123°23′53″W	Winston	
36	Stephens Community Historic District	Stephens Community Historic District	October 25, 1984 (#84000135)	Fort McKay and Scott Henry Rds. 43°22′57″N 123°23′34″W	Sutherlin	
37	Susan Creek Indian Mounds Site		November 20, 1974 (#74001683)	Address restricted	Glide	
38	Sutherlin Bank Building	Sutherlin Bank Building	August 1, 1984 (#84002987)	101 W. Central Ave. 43°23′25″N 123°18′49″W	Sutherlin	
39	Tiller Ranger Station	Tiller Ranger Station	March 6, 1991 (#91000162)	OR 227, Umpqua NF; 42°55′39″N 122°56′52″W	Tiller	
40	Umpqua River Bridge No. 01822	Umpqua River Bridge No. 01822	August 5, 2005 (#05000815)	Oregon Route Coast 9/U.S. Route 101 at mile post 211.21; 43°42′35″N 124°06′03″W	Reedsport	
41	Umpqua River Light House	Umpqua River Light House	October 21, 1977 (#77001100)	Southwest of Winchester Bay off U.S. 101; 43°39′44″N 124°11′55″W	Winchester Bay	
42	Umpqua–Eden Site		January 11, 1996 (#95001524)	Address restricted	Reedsport	
43	U.S. Army Fort Umpqua	U.S. Army Fort Umpqua	May 26, 2015 (#15000269)	Address restricted	Corvallis vicinity	
44	U.S. Coast Guard Station – Umpqua River, Administration and Equipment Buildings	U.S. Coast Guard Station – Umpqua River, Administration and Equipment Buildings	June 4, 1992 (#92000662)	Douglas Co. Rd. 87; 43°39′50″N 124°11′53″W	Winchester Bay	
45	U.S. Post Office	U.S. Post Office	June 18, 1979 (#79002059)	704 SE Cass Ave. 43°12′31″N 123°20′46″W	Roseburg	
46	Weaver–Worthington Farmstead	Weaver–Worthington Farmstead	August 1, 1984 (#84002996)	8873 Days Creek Cutoff Rd. 42°58′25″N 123°12′56″W	Canyonville vicinity	
47	Whaleback Snow-Survey Cabin	Whaleback Snow-Survey Cabin	December 29, 2000 (#00000514)	Approximately 10 miles (16 km) north of Prospect; 42°54′40″N 122°34′51″W	Prospect vicinity	
48	Judge William R. Willis House	Judge William R. Willis House	June 5, 1975 (#75001582)	744 SE Rose St. 43°12′28″N 123°20′47″W	Roseburg	
49	James Wimer Octagonal Barn	James Wimer Octagonal Barn	December 2, 1985 (#85003039)	1191 Coos Bay Wagon Rd. 43°10′42″N 123°30′24″W	Lookingglass	
50	Winchester Dam	Winchester Dam	June 3, 1996 (#96000627)	N. Umpqua River at Hwy. 99; 43°17′03″N 123°21′14″W	Winchester	
51	William C. and Agnes Winston House	William C. and Agnes Winston House	September 10, 1987 (#87001540)	350 Winston Section Rd. 43°07′53″N 123°23′49″W	Winston	

== Former listings ==
	Name on the Register	Image	Date listed	Date removed	Location	City or town	Description
1	Roaring Camp Bridge	Roaring Camp Bridge	November 29, 1979 (#79002056)	January 17, 1996	West of Drain	Drain vicinity	Listed in 1979.

== See also ==
- National Register of Historic Places listings in Oregon
- Listings in neighboring counties: Coos, Curry, Jackson, Josephine, Klamath, Lane
- Historic preservation
- History of Oregon
- Lists of Oregon-related topics
