= Tahkenitch Landing Site =

- 35-DO-130–Tahkenitch Landing Site
- U.S. National Register of Historic Places
- Location: Address restricted (Note: Federal and state laws and practices restrict general public access to information regarding the specific location of this resource. In some cases, this is to protect archeological sites from vandalism, while in other cases it is restricted at the request of the owner.)
- Nearest city: Gardiner, Oregon
- Area: 2.42 acres (0.98 ha)
- MPS: Native American Archeological Sites of the Oregon Coast MPS
- NRHP reference No.: 01000132
- Added to NRHP: June 10, 2003

The Tahkenitch Landing Site (Smithsonian trinomial: 35DO130) is a prehistoric archeological site located in Oregon Dunes National Recreation Area near Gardiner, Oregon, United States. Stratified remains up to 2 meters (6 ft 7 in) deep show the site has served various functions including shell midden and probably village over a history spanning 7000 to 8000 years, up to as late as 1858 CE. It also bears evidence of dramatic environmental changes including estuarine development, dune formation, and a transition from estuarine to lacustrine habitats. It was the first site on the Oregon coast to yield cultural remains older than about 3000 BP, and as such is one of the most significant sites on the Pacific coast of Oregon and North America.

The Tahkenitch Landing Site was listed on the National Register of Historic Places in 2003.

== See also ==
- National Register of Historic Places listings in Douglas County, Oregon
