= First Presbyterian Church (Roseburg, Oregon) =

Historic church in Oregon, United States

- First Presbyterian Church of Roseburg
- U.S. National Register of Historic Places
- U.S. Historic district – Contributing property
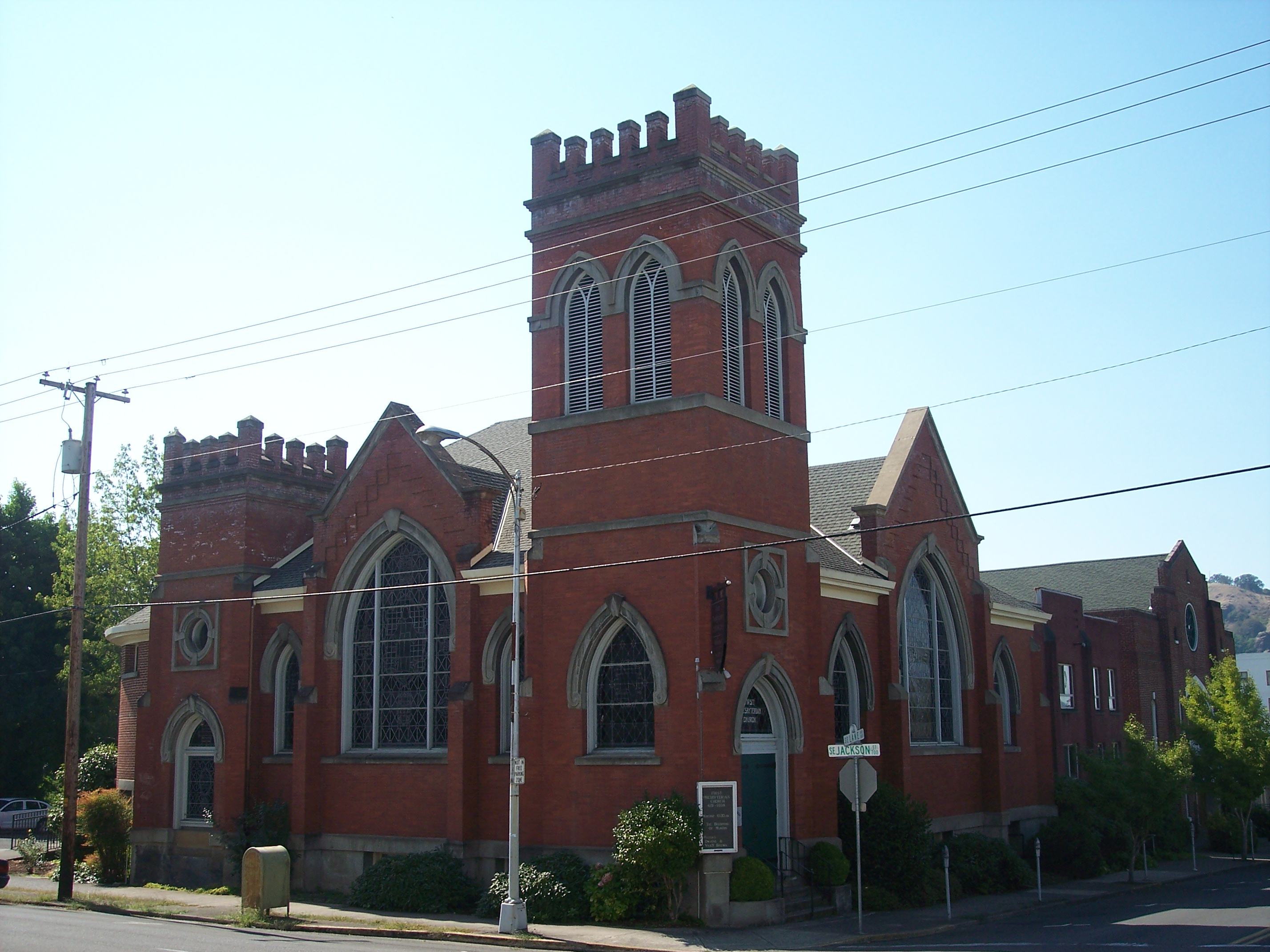
- The First Presbyterian Church in 2011
- Location: 823 SE Lane Avenue; Roseburg, Oregon
- Coordinates: 43°12′25″N 123°20′45″W
- Area: Less than 1 acre (0.40 ha)
- Built: 1909
- Built by: Walter Singleton
- Architect: Bert Holmes
- Architectural style: Late Gothic Revival
- Part of: Roseburg Downtown Historic District (ID02000661)
- NRHP reference No.: 88001162
- Added to NRHP: July 28, 1988

The First Presbyterian Church is a church and historic church building located in downtown Roseburg, Oregon, United States.

The church was listed on the National Register of Historic Places in 1988.

== See also ==
- National Register of Historic Places listings in Douglas County, Oregon
