= Kohlhagen Building =

- U.S. National Register of Historic Places
- U.S. Historic district – Contributing property
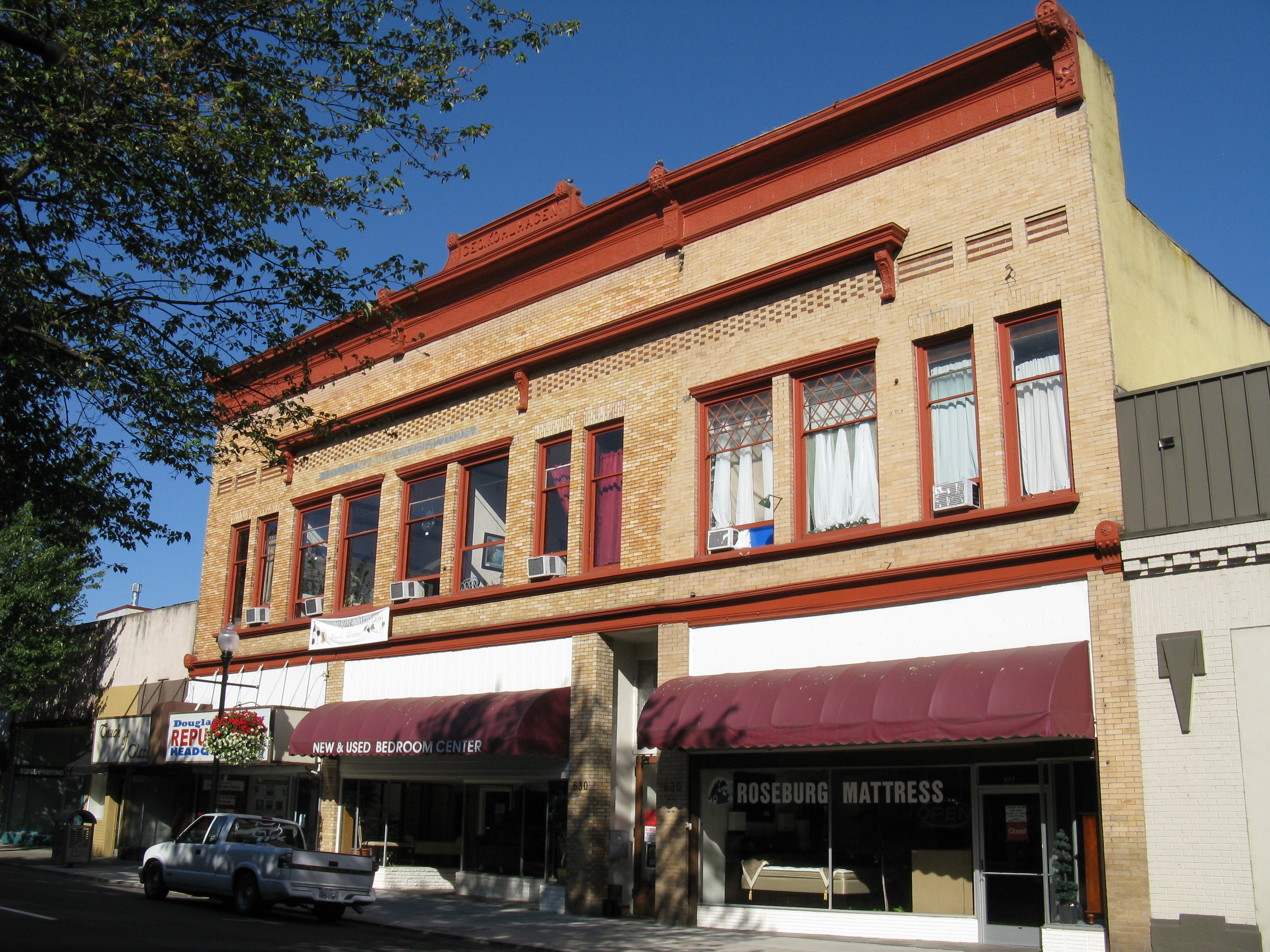
- The Kohlhagen Building in 2009

- Location within Oregon
- Location: 630 SE Jackson Street; Roseburg, Oregon
- Coordinates: 43°12′31″N 123°20′41″W
- Area: 0.27 acres (0.11 ha)
- Built: 1906, expanded 1908, 1912
- Built by: Patterson (1906 portion, possibly remainder)
- Architectural style: Transitional Italianate/ Commercial Style
- Part of: Roseburg Downtown Historic District (ID02000661)
- NRHP reference No.: 97000589
- Added to NRHP: June 13, 1997

The Kohlhagen Building is a historic commercial building located in downtown Roseburg, Oregon, United States. It was built between 1906 and 1912.

The building was listed on the National Register of Historic Places in 1997.

== See also ==
- National Register of Historic Places listings in Douglas County, Oregon
