= United States Post Office (Roseburg, Oregon) =

- U.S. Post Office
- U.S. National Register of Historic Places
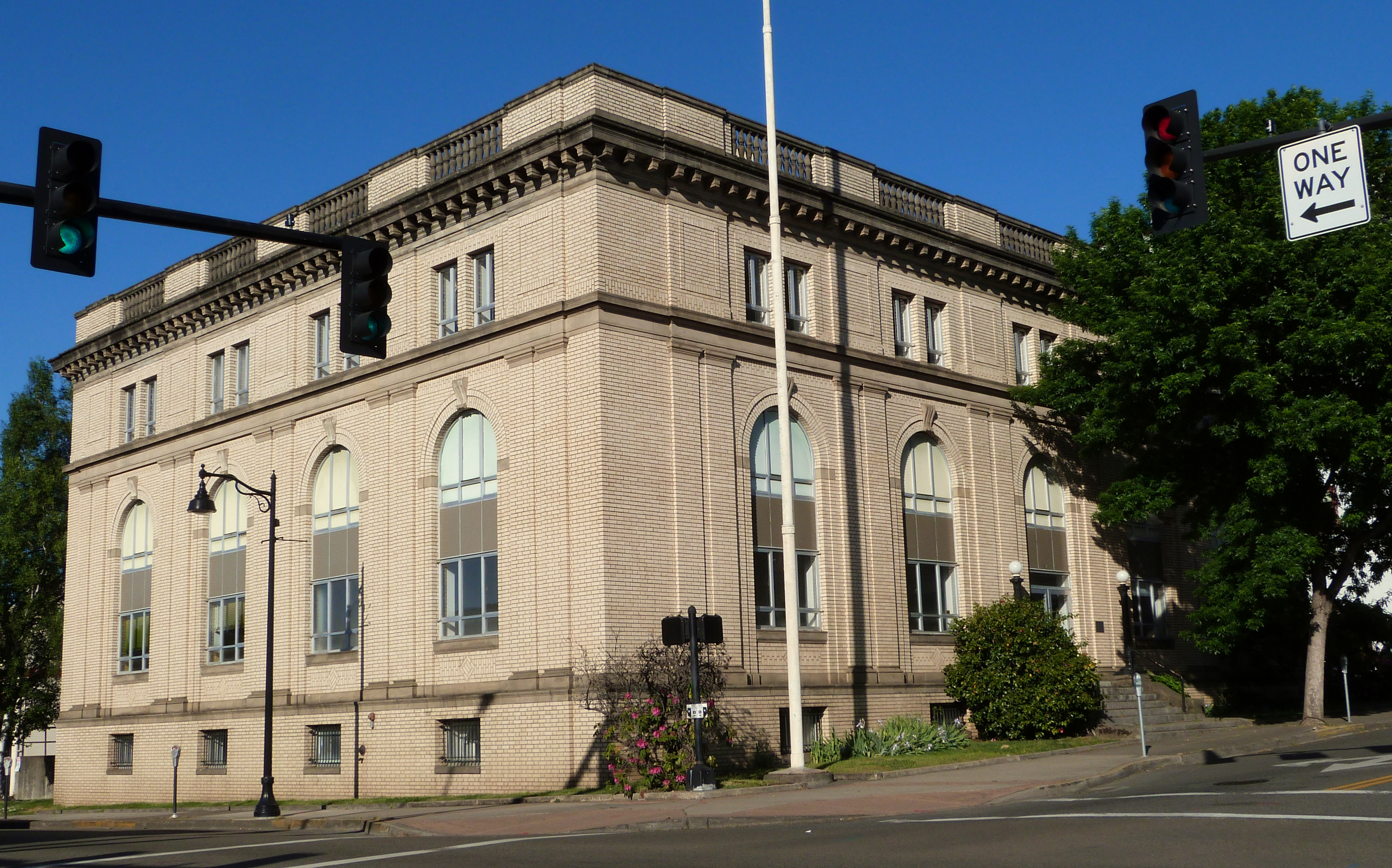
- The building in 2013
- Interactive map showing the location of U.S. Post Office, Roseburg
- Location: 704 SE Cass Avenue; Roseburg, Oregon
- Coordinates: 43°12′28″N 123°20′46″W
- Area: 1.5 acres (0.61 ha)
- Built: 1916
- Architect: Office of the Supervising Architect under James A. Wetmore
- Architectural style: Beaux Arts, Georgian, Georgian Revival
- NRHP reference No.: 79002059
- Added to NRHP: June 18, 1979

The U.S. Post Office is a post office building in Roseburg, Oregon, in the United States. It was constructed in 1916 and was added to the National Register of Historic Places on June 18, 1979.

== See also ==
- National Register of Historic Places listings in Douglas County, Oregon
