= English Settlement School =

- U.S. National Register of Historic Places
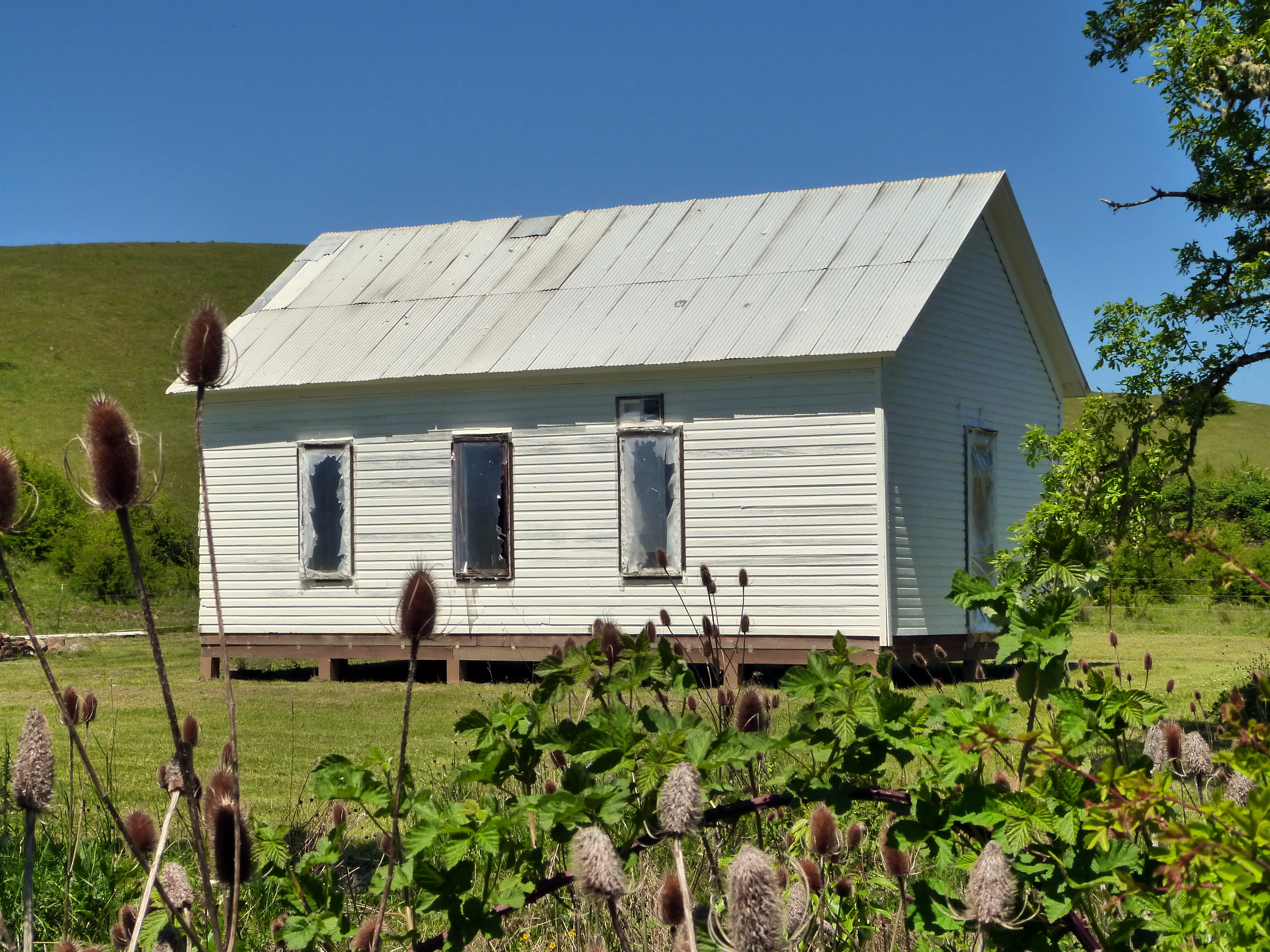
- The building in May 2013

- Location within Oregon Location within the United States
- Location: 17455 Elkhead Road; Oakland, Oregon
- Coordinates: 43°28′20″N 123°13′27″W
- Area: 1 acre (0.40 ha)
- Built: 1910
- NRHP reference No.: 07000924
- Added to NRHP: September 4, 2007

The English Settlement School is a school building in Oakland, Oregon, in the United States. The building was constructed in 1910 and was added to the National Register of Historic Places on September 4, 2007.

== See also ==
- National Register of Historic Places listings in Douglas County, Oregon
