= Mill–Pine Neighborhood Historic District =

Historic district in Oregon, United States

- U.S. National Register of Historic Places
- U.S. Historic district
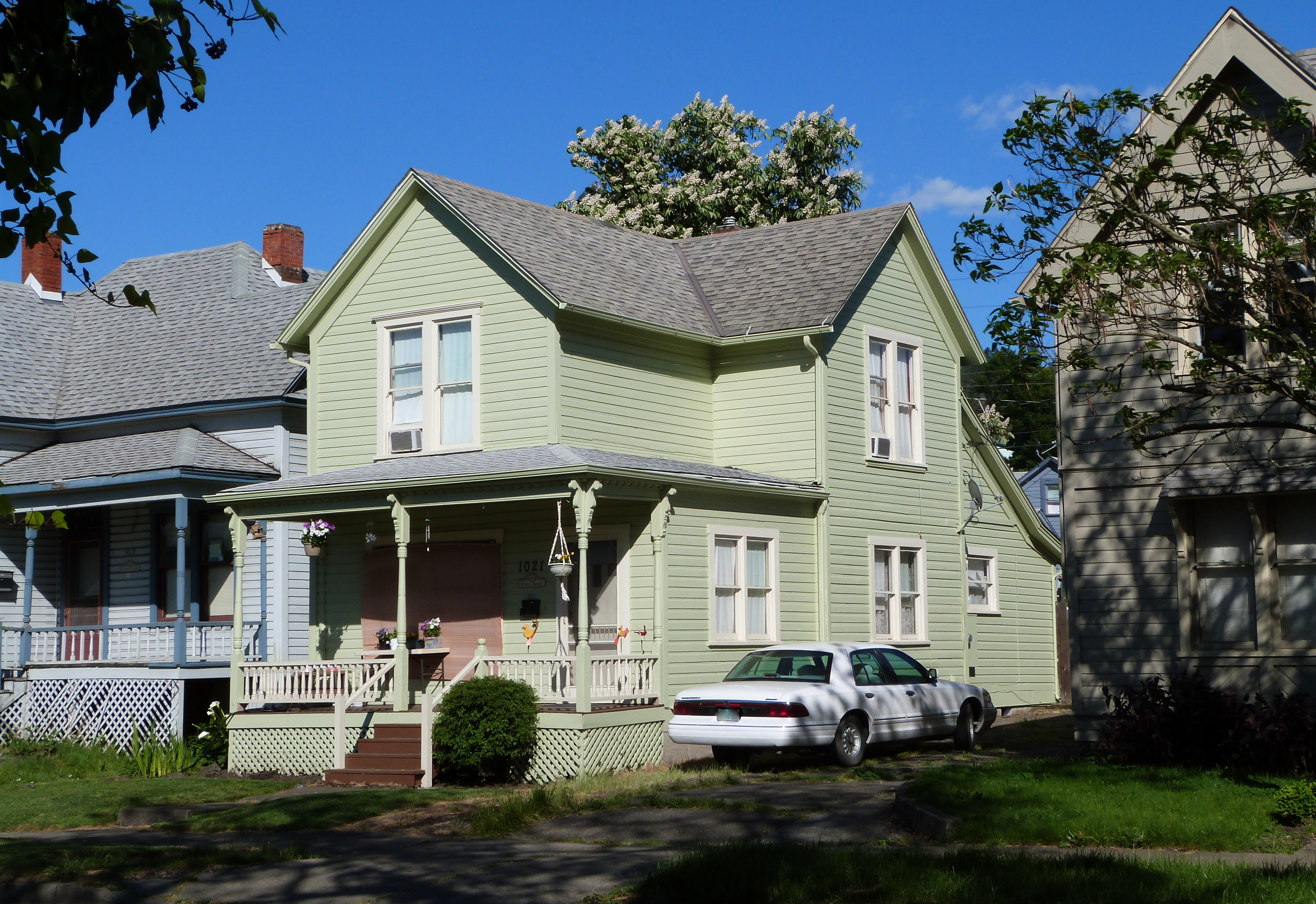
- The White House (1895) in the Mill–Pine Neighborhood Historic District, in 2013

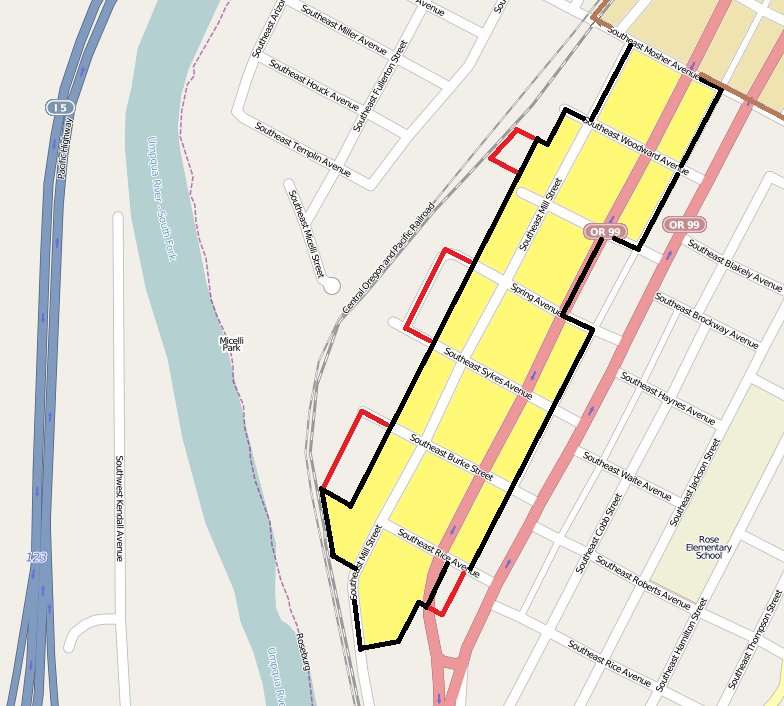
- The Mill–Pine Neighborhood Historic District boundaries in Roseburg (black), and parcels formerly part of the district (red)
- Location: Roseburg, Oregon, along SE Mill and Pine Streets between Rice and Mosher Avenues
- Coordinates: 43°12′13″N 123°21′07″W
- Area: 29 acres (12 ha)
- Built: 1878–1927
- Architectural style: Rural Gothic, Italianate, Queen Anne, Bungalow
- NRHP reference No.: 85001348; 11000624 (decrease)

Significant dates
- Added to NRHP: June 20, 1985
- Boundary decrease: September 26, 2011

The Mill–Pine Neighborhood Historic District is a residential historic district located in Roseburg, Oregon, United States. Beginning in 1878, this neighborhood of modest homes developed to house employees of the adjacent railroad, and the service and retail workers who served them. Physical evolution of the district largely ceased after Southern Pacific Transportation Company moved its operational base from Roseburg to Eugene in 1927, leaving an unusually cohesive example of a working-class residential neighborhood of the late 19th and early 20th centuries. The historic district was listed on the National Register of Historic Places in 1985, and reduced in size in 2011 to reflect the destruction of some historic buildings.

== See also ==
- National Register of Historic Places listings in Douglas County, Oregon
