= Oregon State Soldier's Home Hospital =

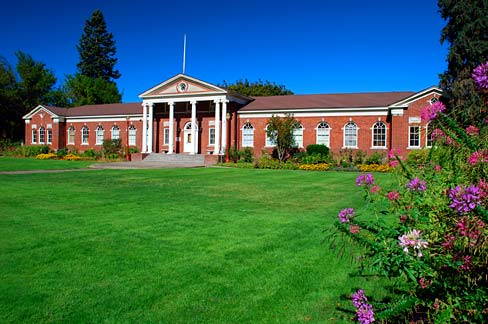
The building in 2010

The Oregon State Soldier's Home Hospital, now known as the Umpqua Arts Center, is a former old soldiers' home in Roseburg, Oregon. The building is listed on the National Register of Historic Places.

== Gallery ==
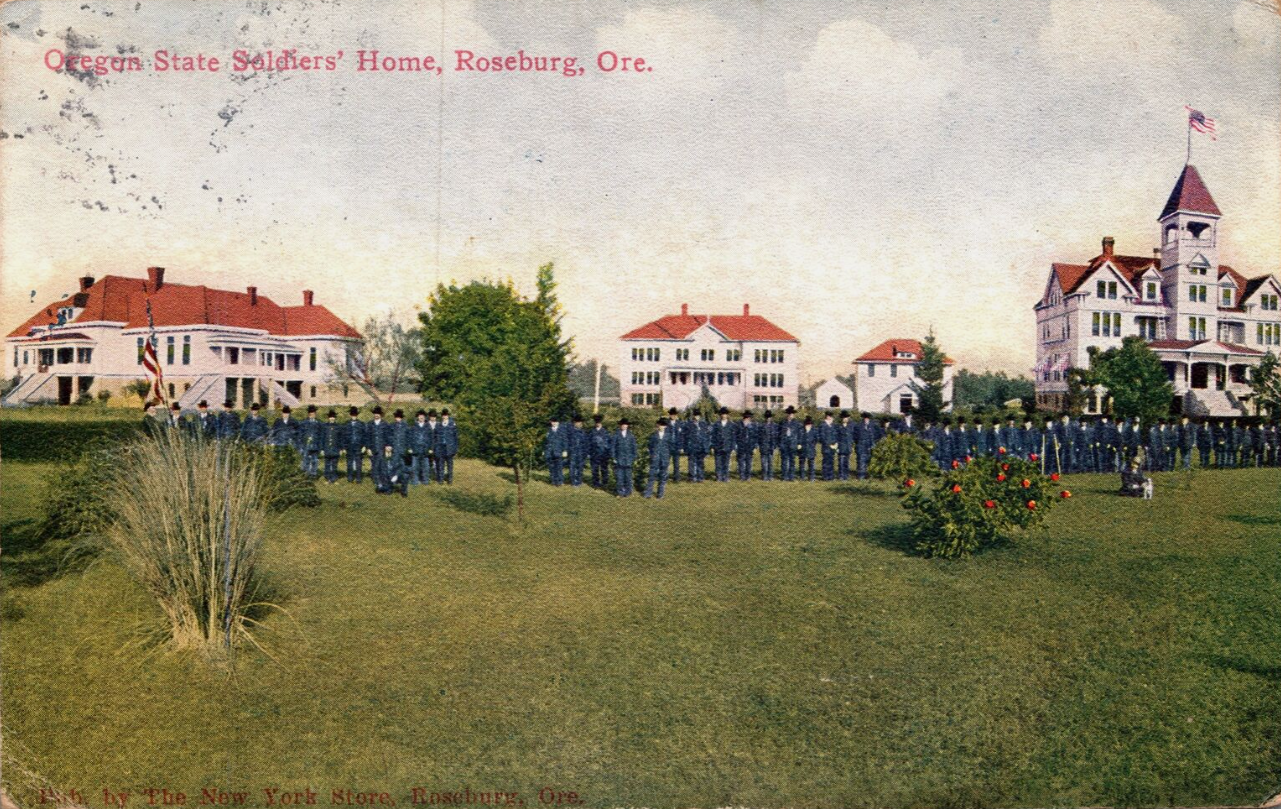
Oregon State Soldier's Home Hospital, Roseburg, Oregon, in 1916

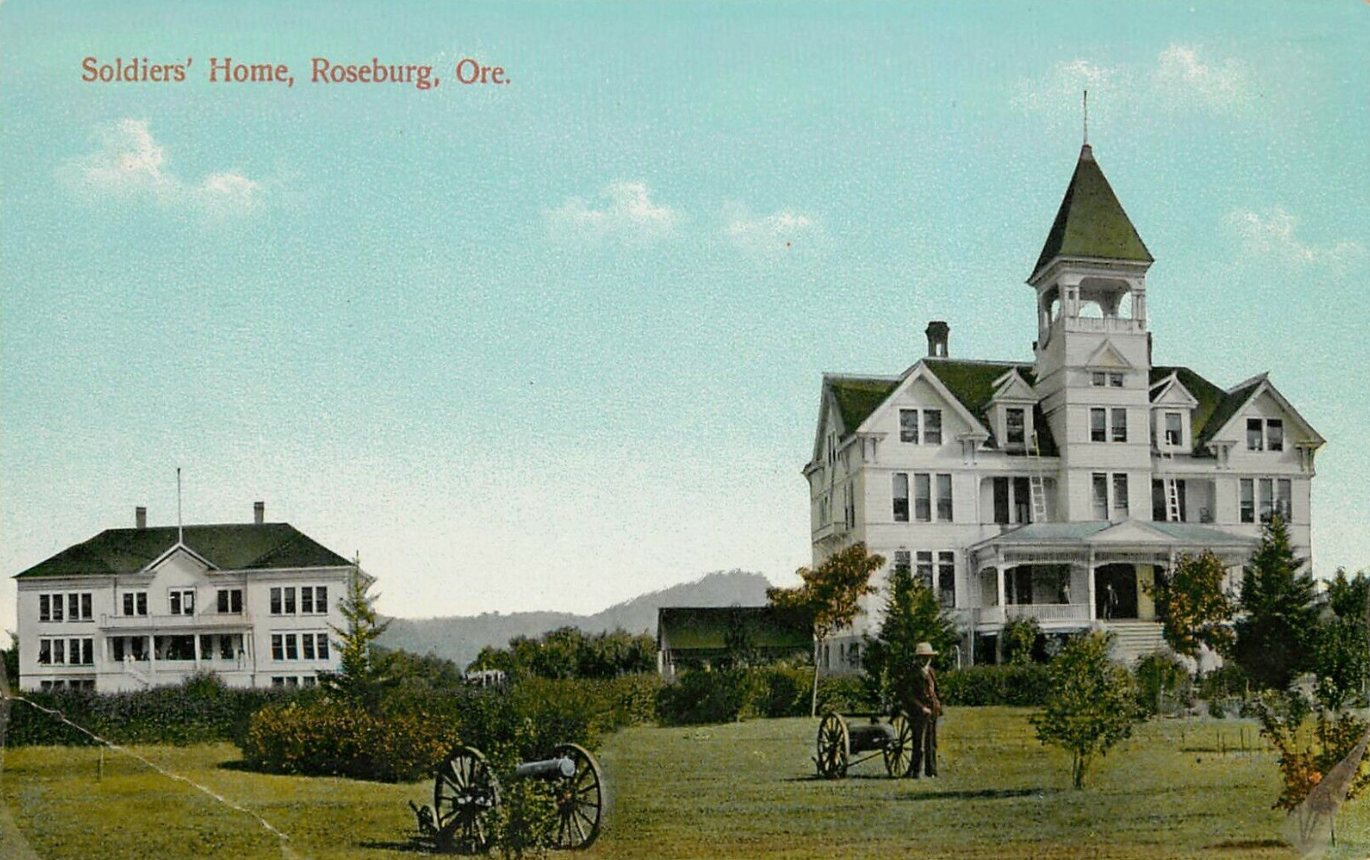
Soldiers' Home, Roseburg, Oregon, around 1910

== See also ==
- National Register of Historic Places listings in Douglas County, Oregon
