= Sutherlin Bank Building =

- U.S. National Register of Historic Places
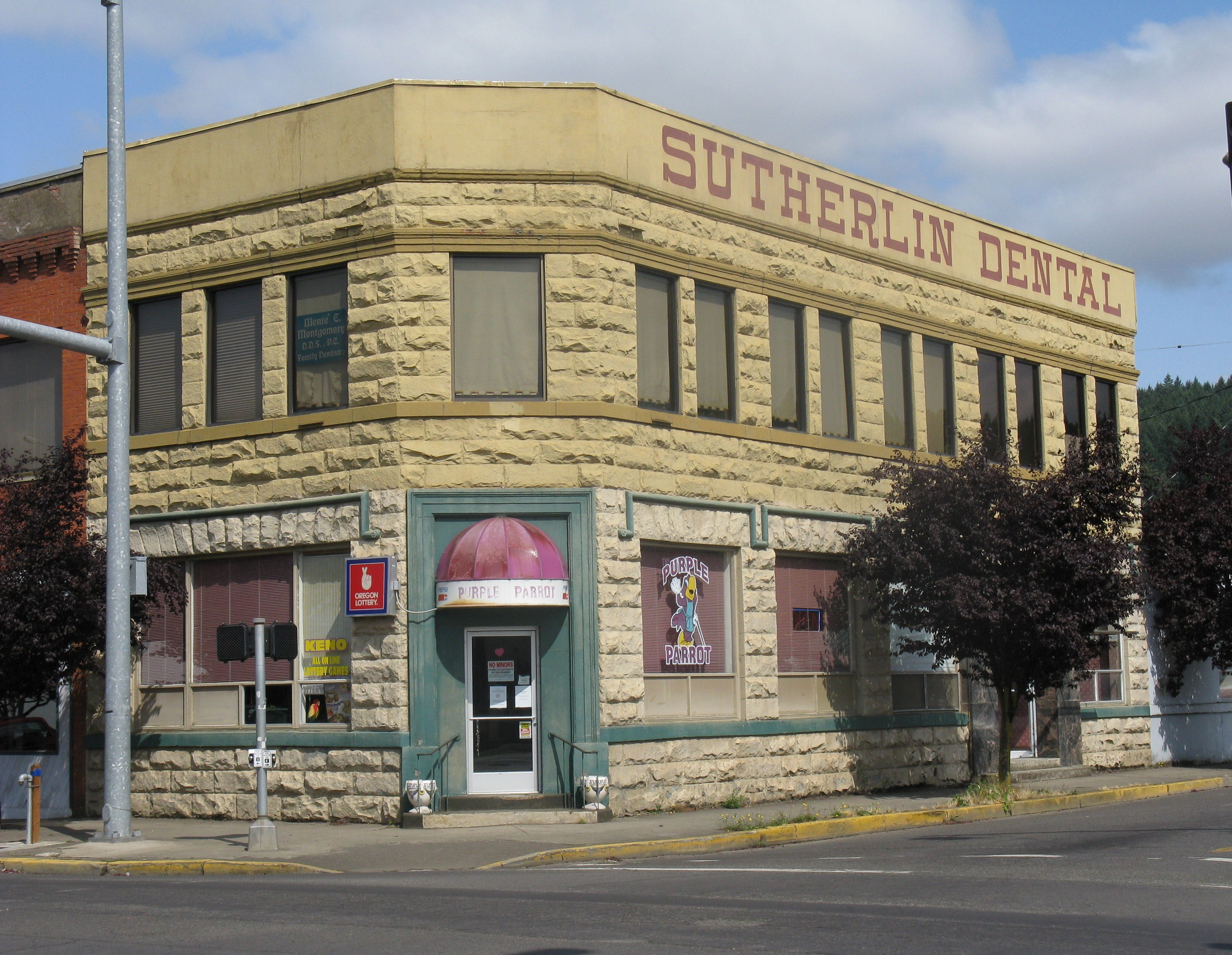
- The building in 2009

- Location within Oregon Location within the United States
- Location: 101 West Central Avenue; Sutherlin, Oregon
- Coordinates: 43°23′25″N 123°18′45″W
- Area: less than one acre
- Built: 1910
- NRHP reference No.: 84002987
- Added to NRHP: August 1, 1984

The Sutherlin Bank Building is a bank building in Sutherlin, Oregon, in the United States. It was built in 1910 and was added to the National Register of Historic Places on August 1, 1984.

== See also ==
- National Register of Historic Places listings in Douglas County, Oregon
