= Winchester Dam =

- U.S. National Register of Historic Places
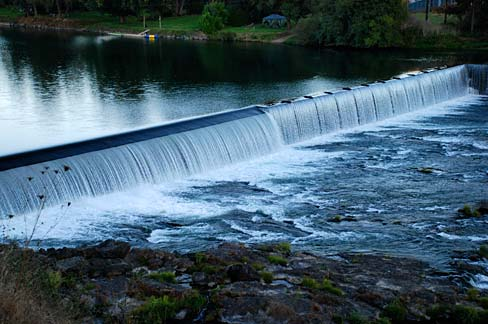
- The dam in 2010

- Location within Oregon Location within the United States
- Location: N. Umpqua River at Hwy. 99, Winchester, Oregon, U.S.
- Coordinates: 43°17′5″N 123°21′12″W
- Area: 2.2 acres (0.89 ha)
- Built: 1890
- Architect: Briggs, Charles A
- NRHP reference No.: 96000627
- Added to NRHP: June 3, 1996

Winchester Dam is a dam on the North Umpqua River in Winchester, Oregon, United States. Constructed in 1890, the dam was added to the National Register of Historic Places in 1996.

The Winchester Dam was made from large timber cribs. Originally, the dam was a mere four feet high, which was raised to sixteen feet in 1907. The dam was the main source of water and electricity for the town of Roseburg until 1923. The dam's hydropower facilities have long since been removed, and the structure is now maintained solely for the recreational benefit of the Winchester Water Control District, composed of the private landowners surrounding the reservoir pool.

== History ==
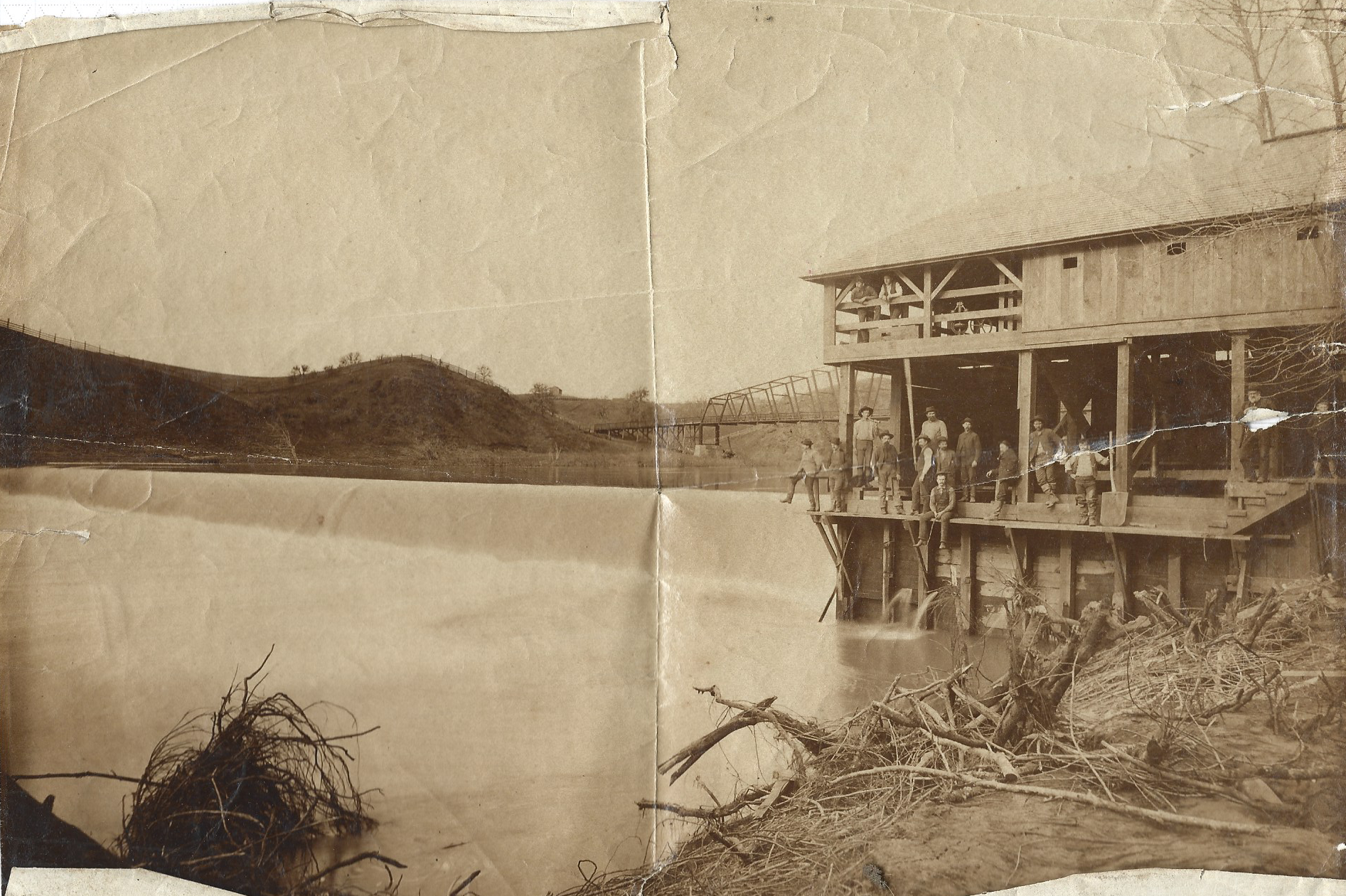
An early photo of the dam and powerhouse

In spring of 1890, a man named Henry Dumbleton purchased the small town of Winchester, Oregon with plan for the area to become an industrial site. Dumbleton saw the nearby river as the ideal location for a dam, which would supply power to the proposed industrial buildings. The construction contract for the dam was awarded to contractor Charles A. Briggs in June 1890. The project was completed in October 1890, and a grand opening festival was held in November 1890.

The dam was purchased by two men from Pittsburgh, J L Kendall, and S A Kendall in 1907. After the Kendalls took over ownership, the dam saw major developments, including raising its head to fourteen feet. The raised height of the dam was constructed over the original log cribs, encasing the structure in concrete and gravel.

On May 1, 1911, a fire broke out and destroyed the powerhouse on the southern bank. The damage done by the fire was estimated to be $38,000. A new powerhouse made from concrete was rebuilt in its place.

In July 1923, the dam was again sold, being acquired by a Medford, Oregon based company, California Oregon Power Company (COPCO). The first fish ladder was constructed by COPCO in 1923, which was later upgraded in 1939, with assistance from Oregon Department of Fish and Wildlife.

A flood in 1964 caused catastrophic damage to the powerhouse, leading electrical generation from the dam to cease in 1965.

== Public safety ==
The dam is officially categorized as "high hazard" by the Oregon Department of Water Resources, primarily due to likely loss of life in the case of dam failure among the people who frequent the river, parks, and boat ramps just downstream. Following an annual inspection in October 2019, state officials downgraded Winchester Dam's condition to "poor," requested that the owners hire an engineer to comprehensively inspect its structure, and warned the owners to address known dam safety issues soon. According to the 2019 inspection report, Winchester Dam has not received a comprehensive structural inspection, nor have the owners updated the dam's required emergency action plan, since 1987.

== Repairs ==
In January 2020, the Oregon Department of Environmental Quality levied a $58,378 fine for violations during a repair at Winchester Dam in late 2018. According to DEQ, pollution from this repair degraded aquatic habitat, killed numerous fish, and harmed the primary drinking water source for the City of Roseburg and the Umpqua Basin Water Association – serving approximately 37,700 people combined. Officials found that dam repairs were conducted without following established best management practices, even after state and federal agencies provided information in advance on how to protect water quality and fish.

Repairs conducted in August 2023 and inadequate fish salvage efforts by the Winchester Water Control District (WWCD) led to the loss of 550,000 Pacific Lamprey. In October 2023, the Oregon Department of Fish and Wildlife opened a $27 million lawsuit against the WWCD and the company contracted to perform repairs on the dam for the WWCD's negligence.

== Impact to migratory fish ==
In 1994, conservation group Oregon Natural Resources Council released a report titled "Damnable Dams" which called for the removal of a number of Pacific Northwest dams, including Winchester Dam, because of the harm these structures caused to salmon and other fish. Since then, other dams on the "Damnable Dams" list have come down, including Savage Rapids, Elk Creek, and Gold Ray dams in southern Oregon. However, Winchester Dam has remained.

In 2013, the Oregon Department of Fish and Wildlife placed Winchester Dam on the Statewide Fish Passage Priority List, an official listing of Oregon's top artificial obstructions to native migratory fish. In 2019, Winchester Dam was raised to the second highest ranked privately owned dam on the Statewide Fish Passage Priority List, where it is noted for impeding passage to 160 miles of high quality habitat for spring Chinook, fall Chinook, summer steelhead, winter steelhead, cutthroat trout, and Pacific Lamprey, as well as Southern Oregon Coast Coho which are listed as threatened under the Endangered Species Act.

Oregon Department of Fish and Wildlife staff maintain and operate the Winchester Dam's fish ladder through an easement providing access, but lack a substantive written system or analysis for maximizing fish passage efficiency at different flows. Winchester's ladder has a number of right angle turns and the ability to control flow velocities in the ladder is limited, making it difficult to pass fish at a wide range of flows. In mid-2019, after the dam owners objected, state officials declined the offer of seventeen conservation and fishing groups to fully fund an aquatic engineer to independently analyze the ladder and create a comprehensive system for maximizing ladder efficiency at different flows.

== Fish counting station ==
There is a fish counting station maintained by the Oregon Department of Fish and Wildlife here. At the station, biologists count fish to monitor population, design management methods, and prescribe angling regulations. Although the fish ladder at Winchester Dam does not meet current federal standards for passing fish, it has generated information for fishery management decisions since 1945. Since 2015, funding for fish counting at the station has been significantly reduced, and local fishermen have questioned the accuracy of the station's results.

== See also ==
- National Register of Historic Places listings in Douglas County, Oregon
