= James Wimer Octagonal Barn =

- U.S. National Register of Historic Places
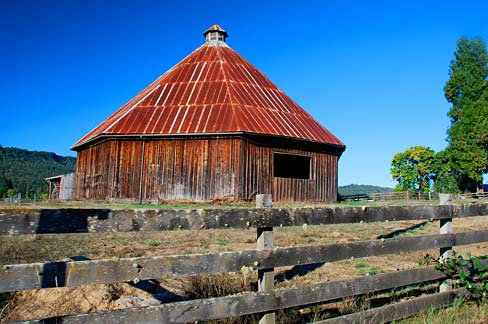
- The barn in 2010

- Location within Oregon Location within the United States
- Location: 1191 Coos Bay Wagon Road; Lookingglass, Oregon
- Coordinates: 43°10′43″N 123°30′21″W
- Area: less than one acre
- Built: 1892
- Built by: James Wimer, et al.
- Architectural style: Octagonal barn
- NRHP reference No.: 85003039
- Added to NRHP: December 2, 1985

The James Wimer Octagonal Barn is a barn in Lookingglass, Oregon, in the United States. It was built in 1892 and was added to the National Register of Historic Places on December 2, 1985.

== See also ==
- National Register of Historic Places listings in Douglas County, Oregon
