= Rice Brothers and Adams Building =

- U.S. National Register of Historic Places
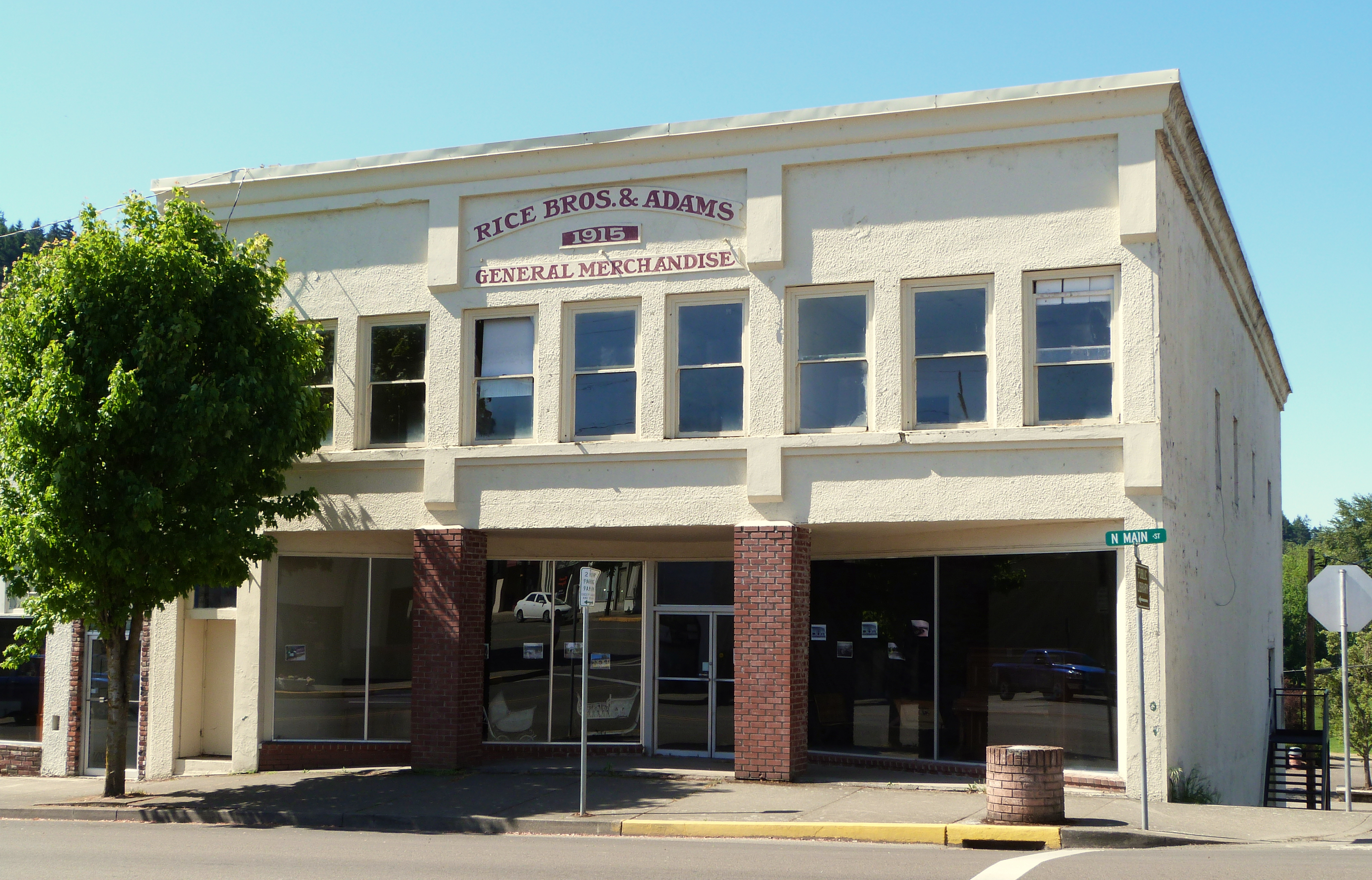
- The building in 2013

- Location within Oregon Location within the United States
- Location: 136 Main Street; Myrtle Creek, Oregon
- Coordinates: 43°1′29″N 123°17′17″W
- Area: less than one acre
- Built: 1915
- Architectural style: Early Commercial
- NRHP reference No.: 83002149
- Added to NRHP: August 11, 1983

The Rice Brothers and Adams Building is a building in Myrtle Creek, Oregon, in the United States. It was built in 1915 and was added to the National Register of Historic Places on August 11, 1983.

In 1900, Bill Stewart, the superintendent of the Chieftain and Continental Gold Mines persuaded farmer, James Rice, to open a produce and dry goods store in exchange for exclusive patronage of the mines. By 1913 Rice had grown out of the initial building and, deciding he needed a larger warehouse in addition to the store so he could store supplies through the winter, took on a partner in Henry Adams. Harry Rice, James brother, also decided to join the venture. In 1915, the Rice brothers and Adams constructed this building on Main Street. The whole is of reinforced concrete and represents one of the earliest uses of concrete in local building construction.

The first floor was a grocery and dry goods store. The top floor was, in effect, a mezzanine, the center being open down to the street level. This level contained a millinery shop. A salesman traditionally came in each spring from Portland during the historic period with the latest styles of hats and used this space to sell them. The basement contained a warehouse for holding supplies throughout the winter. Warehouse items were transported between the railroad station across bottom land to the west and a large loading platform in the rear wall of the building.

== See also ==
- National Register of Historic Places listings in Douglas County, Oregon
