= Floed–Lane House =

Historic house in Oregon, United States

- Creed Floed House
- U.S. National Register of Historic Places
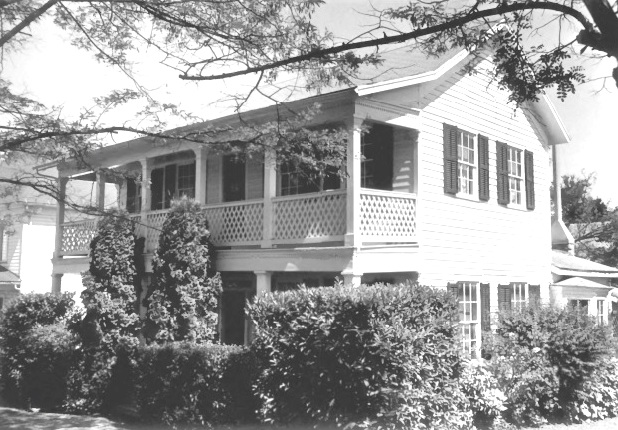
- Location: 544 Southeast Douglas Avenue; Roseburg, Oregon
- Coordinates: 43°12′43″N 123°20′45″W
- Built: 1854
- Architectural style: Classical Revival
- NRHP reference No.: 74001684
- Added to NRHP: December 31, 1974

The Floed–Lane House, also known as the Creed Floed House, is a Classical Revival house museum in Roseburg, Oregon. It was completed in 1854, although some researchers believed the year was 1860. The house is a standard, two up and two down design with upper and lower story porches. It was home to the daughter of Joseph Lane and generations of descendants of the Lane family until it was donated to the Douglas County Historical Society in 1960, following damage sustained in the Roseburg Blast of 1959. The Lane family intended the gift as a memorial to Joseph Lane and family.

Aaron and Sarah Rose, for whom Roseburg is named, sold an acre of their 1851 Donation Land Claim to Solomon and Hyman Abraham in 1860. The Abraham brothers purchased an additional acre from Rose in 1861. Speculation exists about whether the Floed–Lane House had already been constructed on the property purchased by the Abraham brothers. In 1866, Roseburg merchant John Creed Floed and his wife, Sarah Emily Lane, daughter of Joseph Lane, purchased an acre from the Abrahams, and the house was part of the transaction. General Lane lived in a two-room house nearby but spent his daylight hours with his children and grandchildren in nearby houses, including the Floed–Lane House.

The house is known by several names, including the Lane House, the Joseph Lane House, and the Creed Floed House, and the description accompanying the NRHP nomination form begins, The Lane House General Joseph "Creed Floed House" in Roseburg was built in 1853–54. It was added to the National Register of Historic Places in 1974.

== See also ==
- National Register of Historic Places listings in Douglas County, Oregon
