= Hershberger Mountain Lookout =

- U.S. National Register of Historic Places
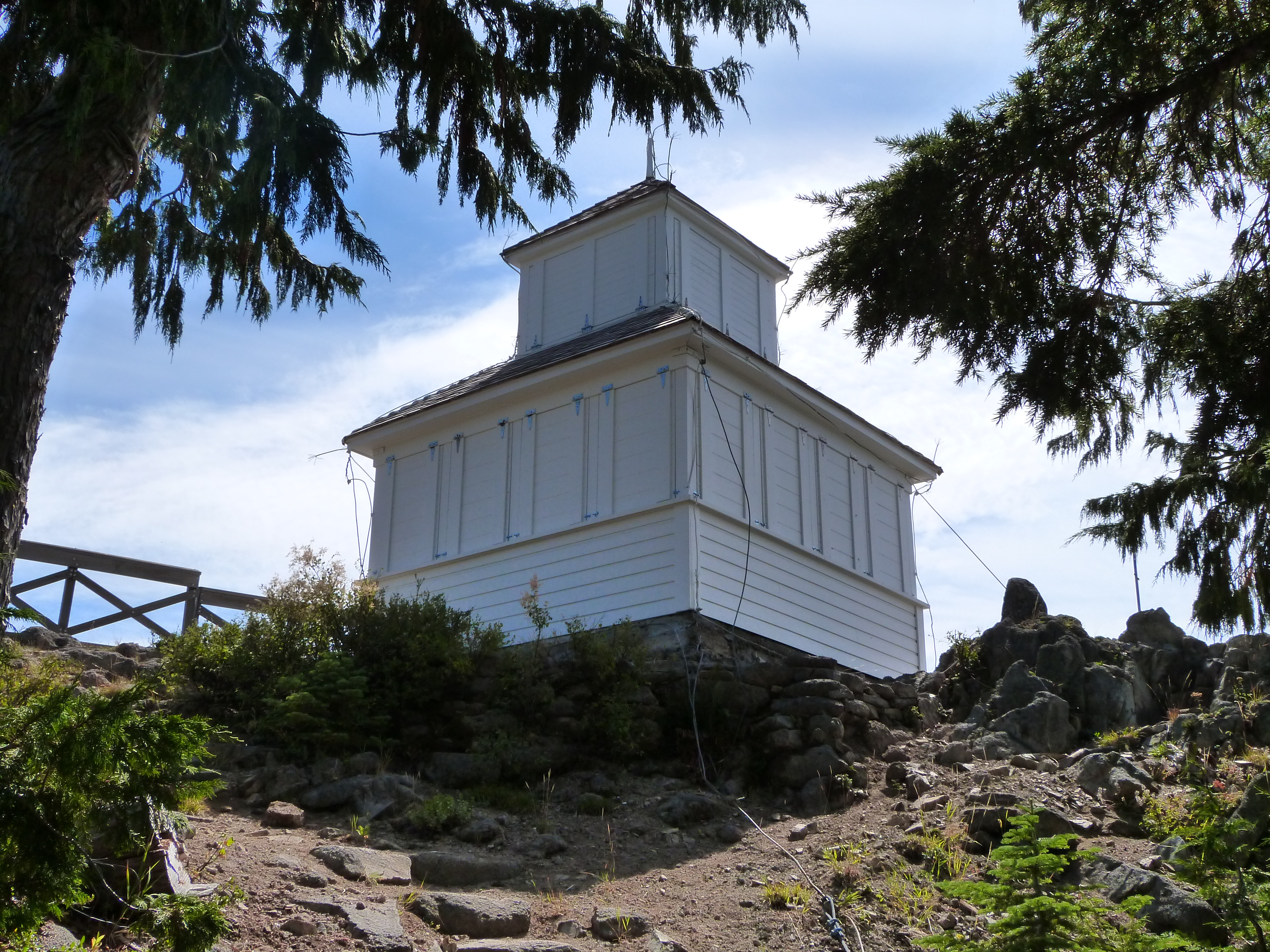
- The Hershberger Mountain Lookout in 2014
- Nearest city: Prospect, Oregon
- Coordinates: 43°02′01″N 122°27′18″W
- Area: 2.8 acres (1.1 ha)
- Built: 1925
- Architectural style: Fire lookout
- MPS: US Forest Service Historic Structures on the Rogue River National Forest MPS
- NRHP reference No.: 00000507
- Added to NRHP: December 29, 2000

Hershberger Mountain Lookout is a lookout structure located near Prospect, Oregon, in the United States. It was built in 1925 and was listed on the National Register of Historic Places on December 29, 2000.

== See also ==
- National Register of Historic Places listings in Douglas County, Oregon
