= Winchester, Oregon =

Unincorporated community in the state of Oregon, United States

Coordinates: 43°16′48″N 123°21′13″W

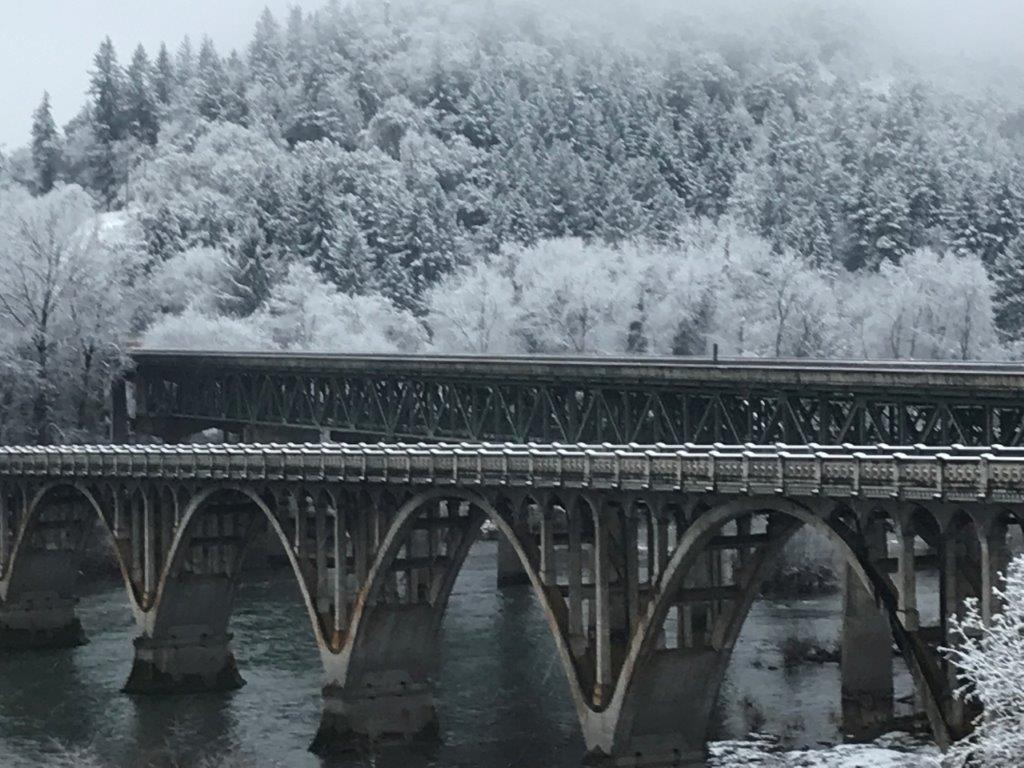
Winchester Bridge over the North Umpqua River

Winchester is an unincorporated community in Douglas County, Oregon, United States. It is on the south bank of the North Umpqua River 4 miles (6.4 km) north of Roseburg on Interstate 5 and is included in the Roseburg North CDP for statistical purposes.

Winchester sits on the south side of the North Umpqua River on Oregon Highway 99. The Winchester Bridge spans the North Umpqua River. Winchester is also known for the Winchester Dam that was constructed in 1889 and is on the National Register of Historic Places.

== History ==
Winchester was laid out in 1850 by surveyor Addison R. Flint, who was part of an Umpqua exploring expedition from San Francisco. The town was named for one of two brothers named Winchester who took part in the expedition, probably Heman Winchester, who was the expedition's captain. Winchester was the largest settlement in the Umpqua Valley for many years and the county seat until 1854, when it was moved to Roseburg. Winchester post office was established in 1851, and Flint served as the first postmaster. The community was incorporated as a city by the Oregon Legislative Assembly on February 20, 1891.

== Climate ==
This region experiences warm (but not hot) and dry summers, with no average monthly temperatures above 71.6 °F (22.0 °C). According to the Köppen Climate Classification system, Winchester has a warm-summer Mediterranean climate, abbreviated "Csb" on climate maps.

Climate data for Winchester, Oregon, 1991–2020 normals, extremes 1989–present
Month	Jan	Feb	Mar	Apr	May	Jun	Jul	Aug	Sep	Oct	Nov	Dec	Year
Record high °F (°C)	71 (22)	75 (24)	82 (28)	92 (33)	101 (38)	112 (44)	109 (43)	111 (44)	103 (39)	95 (35)	78 (26)	67 (19)	112 (44)
Mean maximum °F (°C)	60.9 (16.1)	64.1 (17.8)	72.3 (22.4)	80.6 (27.0)	88.2 (31.2)	92.2 (33.4)	97.5 (36.4)	98.6 (37.0)	94.6 (34.8)	82.4 (28.0)	68.4 (20.2)	61.0 (16.1)	101.0 (38.3)
Mean daily maximum °F (°C)	50.0 (10.0)	54.2 (12.3)	59.2 (15.1)	64.0 (17.8)	71.4 (21.9)	77.2 (25.1)	85.9 (29.9)	86.4 (30.2)	80.5 (26.9)	68.0 (20.0)	55.5 (13.1)	48.9 (9.4)	66.8 (19.3)
Daily mean °F (°C)	42.4 (5.8)	44.7 (7.1)	48.0 (8.9)	51.9 (11.1)	58.3 (14.6)	63.7 (17.6)	70.4 (21.3)	70.2 (21.2)	64.7 (18.2)	55.3 (12.9)	47.0 (8.3)	41.9 (5.5)	54.9 (12.7)
Mean daily minimum °F (°C)	34.7 (1.5)	35.2 (1.8)	36.8 (2.7)	39.8 (4.3)	45.2 (7.3)	50.2 (10.1)	54.9 (12.7)	53.9 (12.2)	48.8 (9.3)	42.6 (5.9)	38.4 (3.6)	34.8 (1.6)	42.9 (6.1)
Mean minimum °F (°C)	26.1 (−3.3)	27.3 (−2.6)	30.0 (−1.1)	32.8 (0.4)	37.4 (3.0)	42.9 (6.1)	49.5 (9.7)	48.5 (9.2)	41.4 (5.2)	33.3 (0.7)	29.1 (−1.6)	25.9 (−3.4)	21.7 (−5.7)
Record low °F (°C)	19 (−7)	18 (−8)	25 (−4)	26 (−3)	30 (−1)	36 (2)	44 (7)	44 (7)	35 (2)	21 (−6)	20 (−7)	7 (−14)	7 (−14)
Average precipitation inches (mm)	5.41 (137)	4.09 (104)	4.01 (102)	3.24 (82)	2.16 (55)	1.11 (28)	0.29 (7.4)	0.30 (7.6)	0.94 (24)	2.55 (65)	5.26 (134)	6.81 (173)	36.17 (919)
Average snowfall inches (cm)	0.0 (0.0)	0.2 (0.51)	0.0 (0.0)	0.0 (0.0)	0.0 (0.0)	0.0 (0.0)	0.0 (0.0)	0.0 (0.0)	0.0 (0.0)	0.0 (0.0)	trace	0.3 (0.76)	0.5 (1.27)
Average precipitation days (≥ 0.01 in)	20.1	17.2	18.0	16.2	11.5	6.2	1.8	2.0	5.1	11.4	19.8	20.2	149.5
Average snowy days (≥ 0.1 in)	0.0	0.2	0.0	0.0	0.0	0.0	0.0	0.0	0.0	0.0	0.0	0.1	0.3
Source 1: NOAA (snow/snow days 1981–2010)
Source 2: National Weather Service
