= Canyonville Methodist Church =

Historic church in Oregon, United States

- U.S. National Register of Historic Places
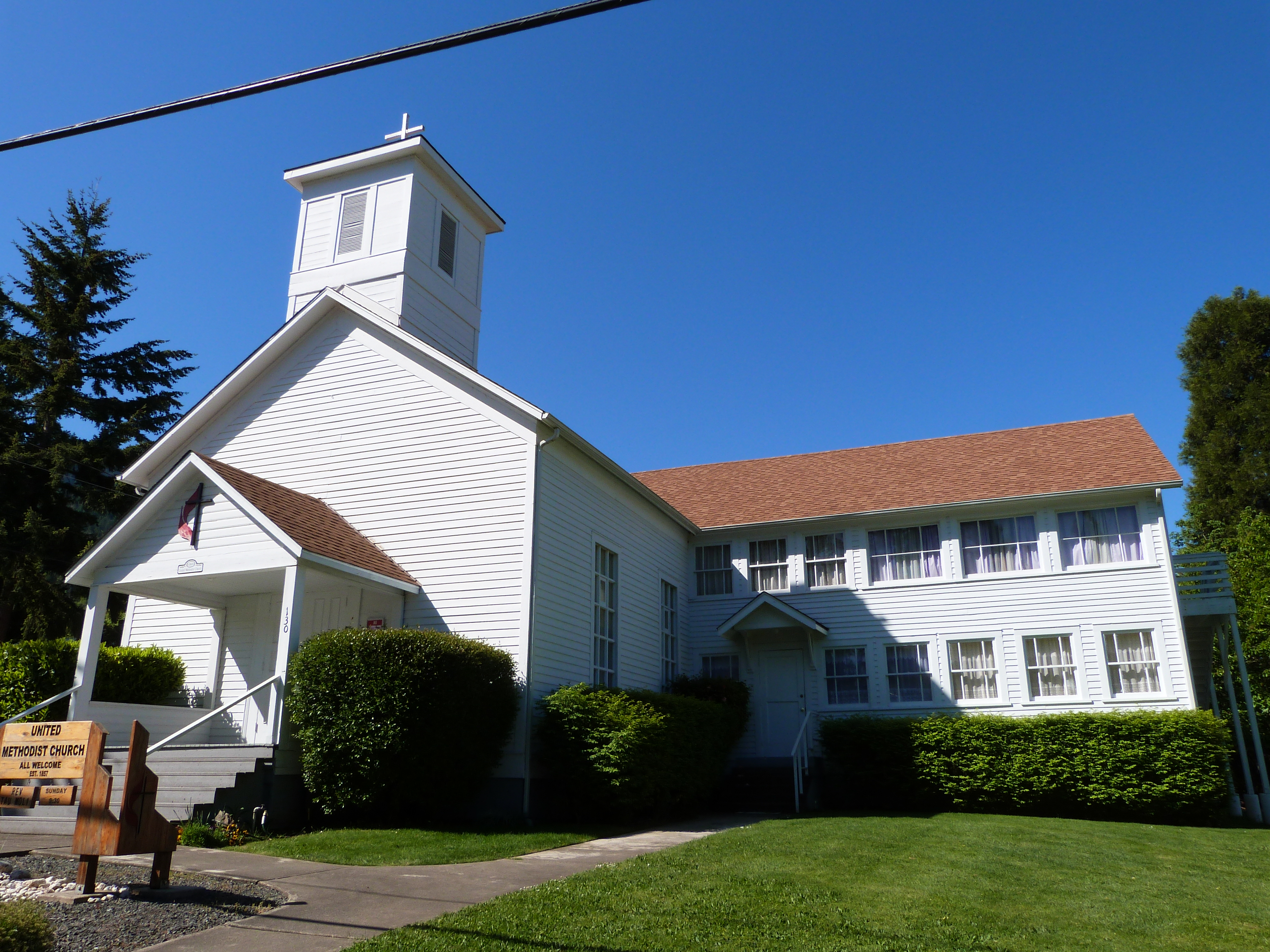
- The Canyonville Methodist Church in 2013
- Location: 2nd and Pine Streets; Canyonville, Oregon
- Coordinates: 42°55′38″N 123°16′49″W
- Area: less than one acre
- Built: 1868
- Architectural style: Classical Revival
- NRHP reference No.: 84002983
- Added to NRHP: April 5, 1984

Canyonville Methodist Church (Canyonville United Methodist Church) is a historic church at 2nd and Pine Streets in Canyonville, Oregon. It was built in 1868, and added to the National Register of Historic Places in 1984.
