= Gardiner, Oregon =

Unincorporated community in the state of Oregon, United States

- Gardiner Historic District
- U.S. National Register of Historic Places
- U.S. Historic district
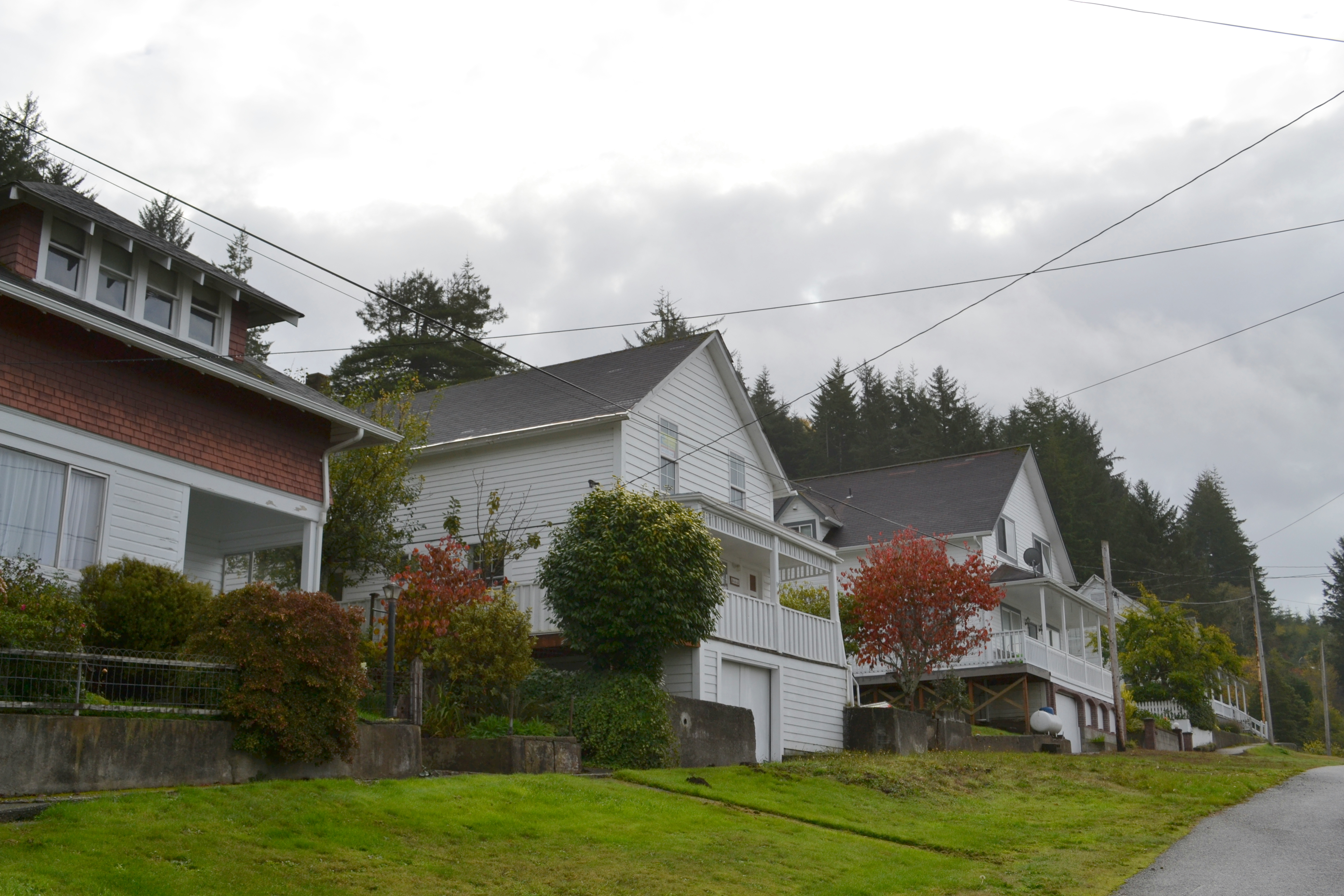
- The Gardiner Historic District in 2011

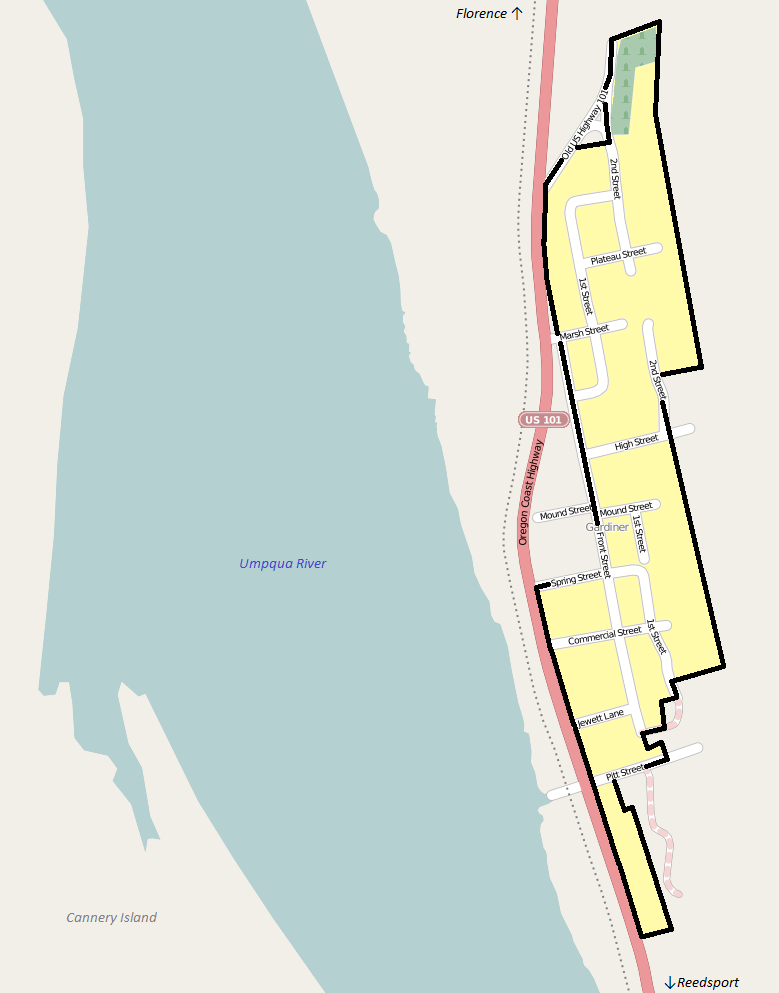
- The Gardiner Historic District boundaries.
- Location: Gardiner, Oregon, roughly bounded by 3rd, Camp, 2nd, Pitt, Spring, Front and Garden Streets
- Nearest city: Reedsport, Oregon
- Coordinates: 43°43′49″N 124°06′36″W
- Area: 35 acres (14 ha)
- Built: 1870–1940
- NRHP reference No.: 93000003
- Added to NRHP: January 31, 1994

Gardiner is an unincorporated community and census-designated place in Douglas County, Oregon, United States, across the Umpqua River from Reedsport. It is located on U.S. Route 101. As of the 2020 census, Gardiner had a population of 259.

Gardiner is named for a Boston merchant whose ship, the Bostonian, shipwrecked at the mouth of the Umpqua on October 1, 1850. Gardiner was seeking to trade along the river, and most of his goods were saved from the ship and moved to the location that came to be the town of Gardiner. In 1851, the site became the headquarters of the Umpqua customs district, and a post office named "Gardiners City" was established the same year. The name of the post office changed to "Gardiner City" and eventually to its current name.

The Gardiner Historic District, which encompasses nearly all of Gardiner, has been listed on the National Register of Historic Places since 1994. Several steamboats were constructed at Gardiner for trade up the Umpqua River.

A plywood plant opened in Gardiner in 1954, joining the lumber mill (or sawmill) that had been in the town for many years.

Gardiner was formerly the site of the first International Paper mill on the West Coast. The paper mill operated from 1963 until 1999, and was one of the largest employers on the southern Oregon Coast. The mill buildings were demolished in 2006.

A railroad, the Longview, Portland & Northern (LP&N), served the IP mill until it closed. The railroad runs from East Gardiner Junction to the old plant site.

== Climate ==
This region experiences warm (but not hot) and dry summers, with no average monthly temperatures above 71.6 °F (22.0 °C). According to the Köppen Climate Classification system, Gardiner has a warm-summer Mediterranean climate, abbreviated "Csb" on climate maps.

Climate data for Gardiner
Month	Jan	Feb	Mar	Apr	May	Jun	Jul	Aug	Sep	Oct	Nov	Dec	Year
Record high °F (°C)	67 (19)	78 (26)	76 (24)	86 (30)	94 (34)	95 (35)	93 (34)	104 (40)	95 (35)	95 (35)	70 (21)	67 (19)	104 (40)
Mean daily maximum °F (°C)	52.9 (11.6)	54.5 (12.5)	56.5 (13.6)	58.5 (14.7)	62.1 (16.7)	65.1 (18.4)	68.7 (20.4)	69.3 (20.7)	69.2 (20.7)	64.4 (18.0)	56.5 (13.6)	51.3 (10.7)	60.7 (15.9)
Mean daily minimum °F (°C)	39.3 (4.1)	39.9 (4.4)	40.8 (4.9)	42.7 (5.9)	46 (8)	49.6 (9.8)	51.6 (10.9)	52.1 (11.2)	49 (9)	46 (8)	42.7 (5.9)	37.8 (3.2)	44.8 (7.1)
Record low °F (°C)	22 (−6)	14 (−10)	18 (−8)	27 (−3)	31 (−1)	23 (−5)	40 (4)	40 (4)	34 (1)	30 (−1)	24 (−4)	9 (−13)	9 (−13)
Average precipitation inches (mm)	10.3 (260)	8.57 (218)	8.47 (215)	4.84 (123)	3.82 (97)	2.47 (63)	0.64 (16)	0.75 (19)	1.59 (40)	4.65 (118)	12.26 (311)	10.74 (273)	69.09 (1,755)
Average snowfall inches (cm)	0 (0)	0 (0)	0 (0)	0 (0)	0 (0)	0 (0)	0 (0)	0 (0)	0 (0)	0 (0)	0 (0)	0.1 (0.25)	0.1 (0.25)
Average precipitation days	21	17	19	16	13	10	5	5	6	12	22	20	166

== Notable people ==
- Kathryn Clarke, politician
- Alan L. Hart
- Bill Warren, film historian

== Gallery ==
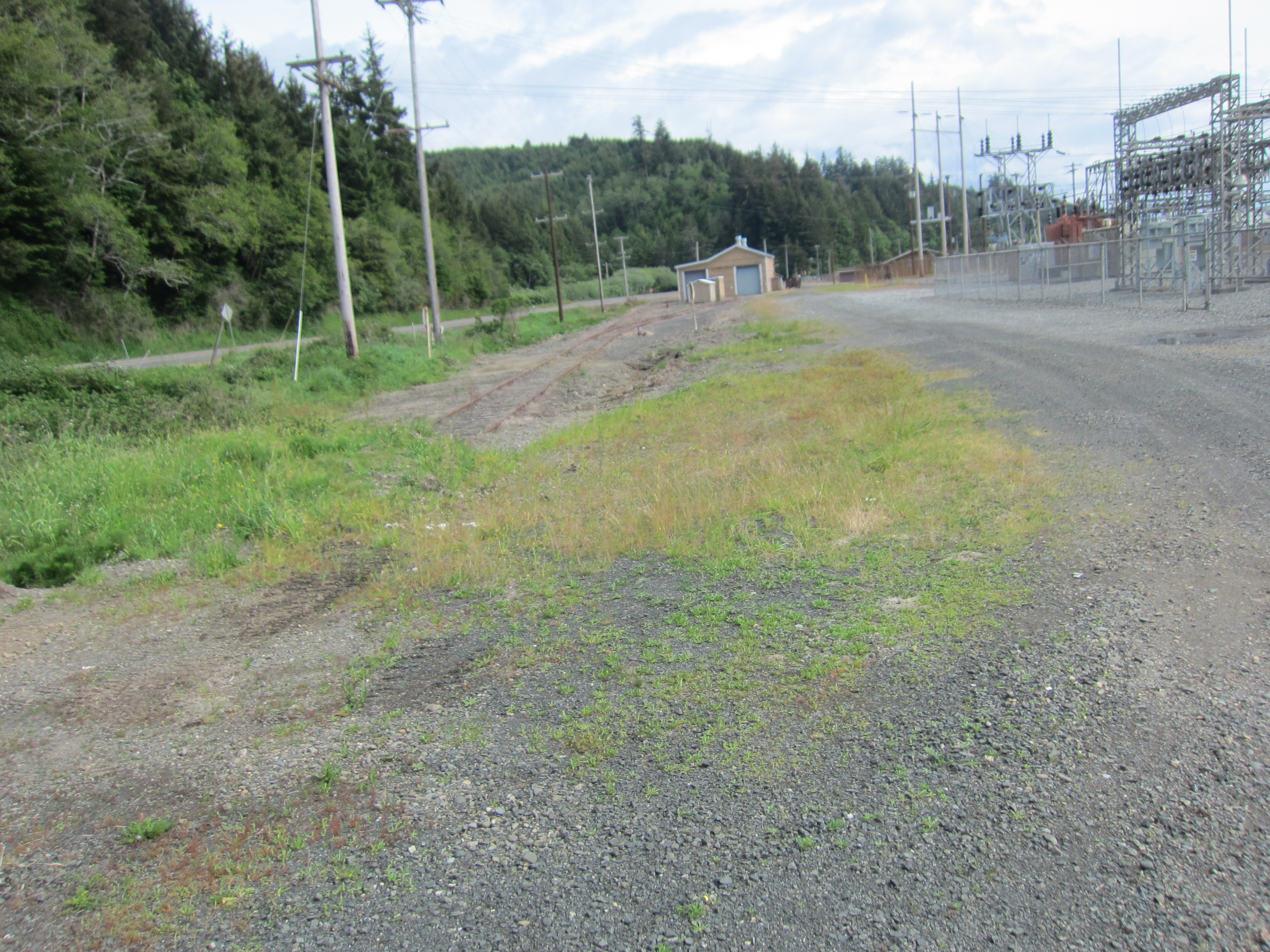
Outside the remnants of the International Paper mill in Gardiner, Oregon

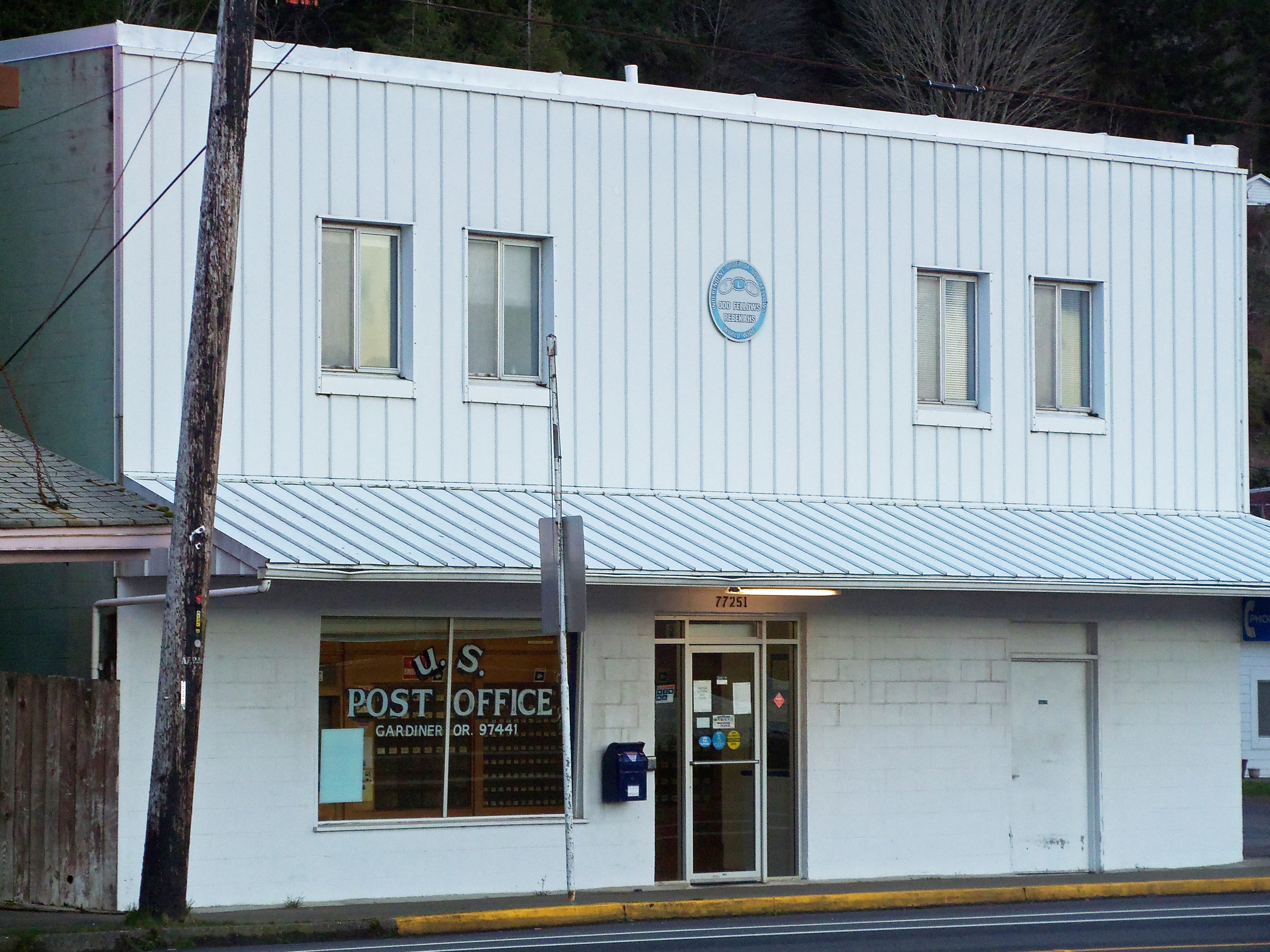
USPS Post Office - Gardiner, Oregon 97441

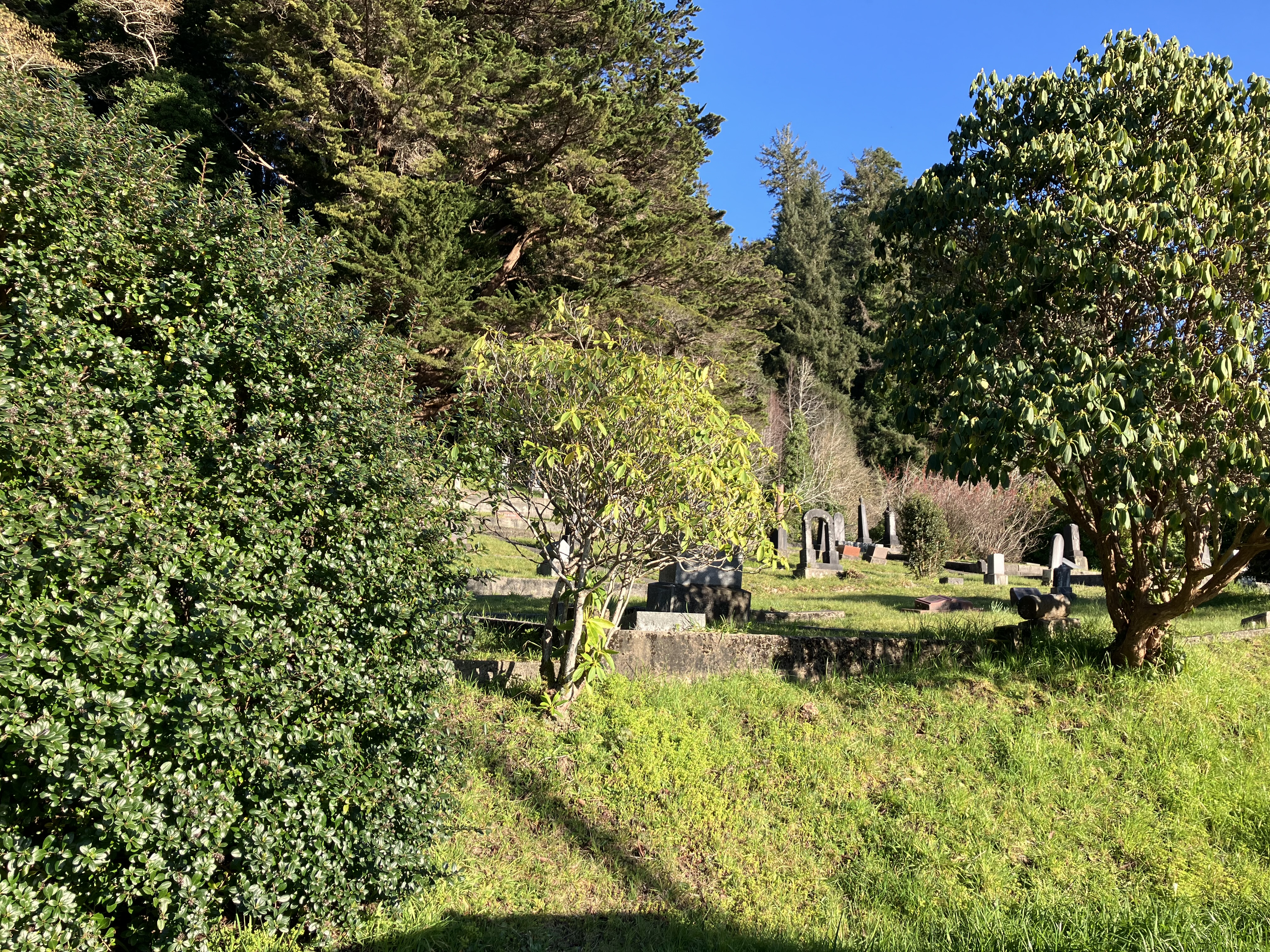
The Gardiner cemetery

== See also ==
- National Register of Historic Places listings in Douglas County, Oregon
- Perkins Lake
- Steamboats of the Oregon Coast
