= Lookingglass, Oregon =

Community in Oregon, United States

- Census-designated place
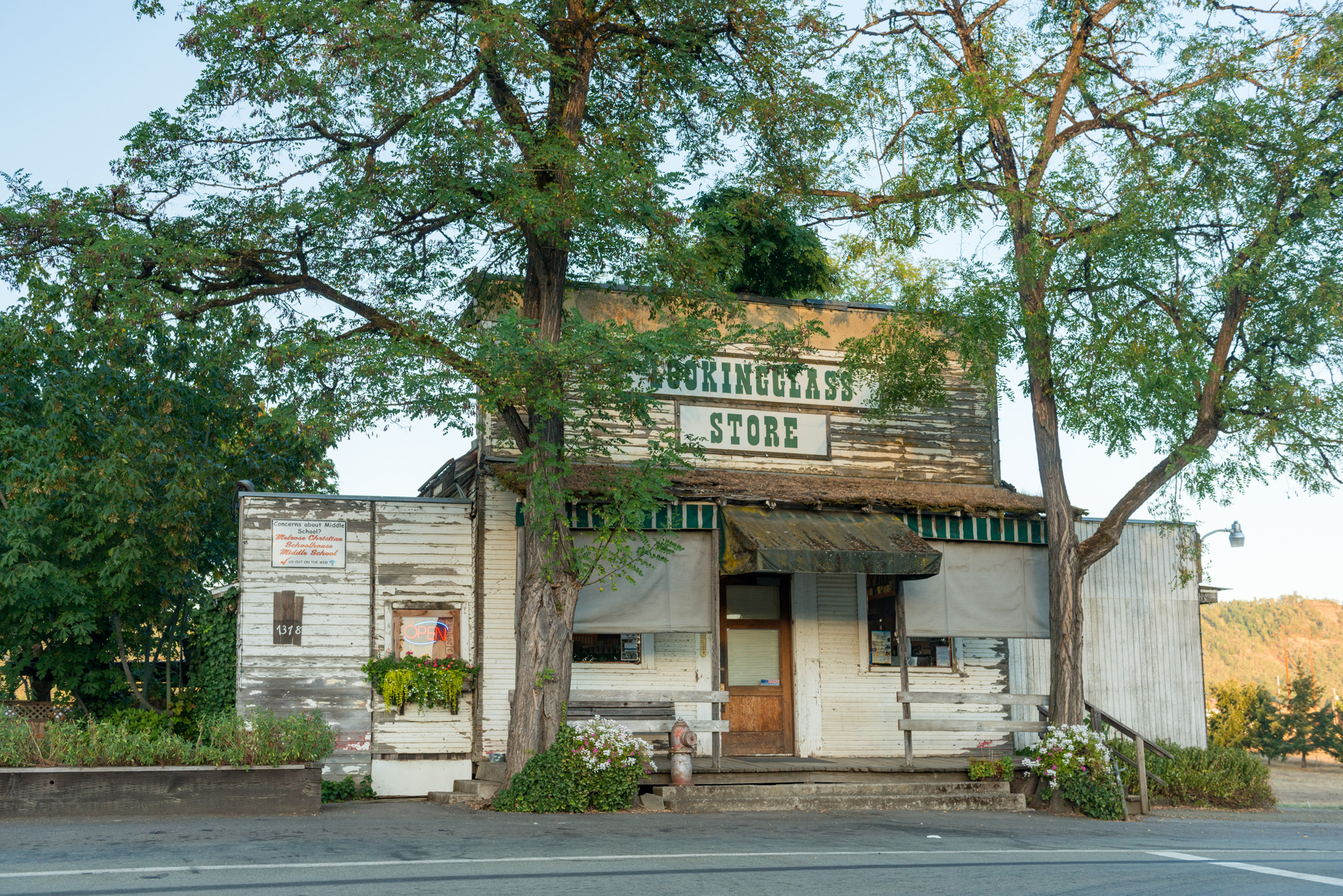

- Location within the state of Oregon
- Coordinates: 43°11′09″N 123°30′32″W
- Country: United States
- State: Oregon
- County: Douglas
- Established: 1846
- Founder: Hoy Flournoy

Area
  - Total: 11.58 sq mi (29.99 km^{2})
  - Land: 11.58 sq mi (29.99 km^{2})
  - Water: 0 sq mi (0.00 km^{2})
- Elevation: 643 ft (196 m)

Population (2020)
  - Total: 916
  - Density: 79.1/sq mi (30.54/km^{2})
- ZIP code: 97471
- Area codes: 458 and 541
- FIPS code: 41-43650
- GNIS feature ID: 2611750

Lookingglass is an unincorporated community and census-designated place in the Lookingglass Valley of Douglas County, Oregon, United States, about 9 miles (14 km) southwest of Roseburg. As of the 2020 census, Lookingglass had a population of 916. Lookingglass is considered a suburb of Roseburg.

== History ==
The valley was named in 1846 by surveyor Hoy Flournoy, who said the beautiful green grass of the valley reflected light almost as well as a mirror. Flournoy later returned to settle in the area.

The Lookingglass Store, built in 1852, was once the terminus for the Oakland to Lookingglass stage and freight road. It was also the beginning of the Coos Bay Wagon Road. Today the store continues to serve as the hub of the community and is the oldest business in Douglas County. Lookingglass also has a school, a grange hall, a church and a fire station. Lookingglass post office closed in 1942.

In the 1970s, Lookingglass, population 40 at the time, received national media attention for installing a two-horse parking meter, a telephone booth, and a fire hydrant. Lookingglass became a minor tourist attraction. When the fire hydrant was dedicated in 1971, it was accompanied by two manhole covers, which covered nothing, donated by a Eugene, Oregon iron company and the mayor of Cedar Rapids, Iowa.

David Brinkley anchored his segment of the NBC Nightly News from the steps of the Lookingglass Store in 1974, while passing through Oregon to do a series of short news stories. Chet Huntley, David Brinkley's co-anchor of the Huntley-Brinkley Report, was the great-grandson of the Lookingglass area's first settler, Daniel Huntley, who arrived in 1851.

The James Wimer Octagonal Barn near Lookingglass was built in 1892 and is listed on the National Register of Historic Places.

== Geography ==
Lookingglass is located in west-central Douglas County in the valley of Lookingglass Creek, a tributary of the South Umpqua River. The community is 9 miles (14 km) southwest of Roseburg, the county seat, via Lookingglass Road.

According to the U.S. Census Bureau, the Lookingglass CDP has an area of 11.6 square miles (30.0 km^{2}), all of it land.

=== Climate ===
This region experiences warm (but not hot) and dry summers, with no average monthly temperatures above 71.6 °F. According to the Köppen Climate Classification system, Lookingglass has a warm-summer Mediterranean climate, abbreviated "Csb" on climate maps.

The USDA Plant Hardiness map lists Lookingglass as being in zone 8b.

== Demographics ==
Historical population
Census	Pop.	Note	%±
2010	855		—
2020	916		7.1%
U.S. Decennial Census

== Education ==
Lookingglass Elementary School is part of the Winston-Dillard School District. It was founded in 1898 and currently serves grades kindergarten through six.
