= Mott Bridge =

Historic bridge in Oregon, United States

- Coordinates: 43°20′34.3″N 122°44′5.6″W
- Carries: Forest Service Road 4712
- Crosses: North Umpqua River
- Locale: Steamboat, Douglas County, Oregon, United States

Characteristics
- Design: Deck arch bridge
- Material: Wood
- Total length: 236.9 ft (72.2 m)
- Longest span: 134.8 ft (41.1 m)

History
- Designer: William D. Smith
- Constructed by: Civilian Conservation Corps
- Built: 1935–1936
- Rebuilt: 1983

Location
- Interactive map of Mott Bridge

Mott Bridge is a historic timber deck arch bridge over the North Umpqua River in Douglas County, Oregon, United States. Constructed in 1935–1936 by the Civilian Conservation Corps, it carries Forest Service Road 4712 over the river, providing access from Oregon Route 138 to the Mott Trailhead on the North Umpqua Trail and the Steamboat Ranger Station. It is named after Lawrence Mott, an author and sportsman who maintained a fishing camp in the area from 1929 until his death in 1931.

== Location ==
The Mott Bridge is located in Douglas County, Oregon, off the North Umpqua Highway (Oregon Route 138) near milepost 39.2, about halfway between Roseburg and Diamond Lake. The Mott Bridge crosses the North Umpqua River, which the North Umpqua Highway follows through much of the corridor. This section of Route 138 is located in the Umpqua National Forest and is part of the Rogue-Umpqua Scenic Byway.

== History ==
In February 1935, the United States Forest Service made plans to construct a bridge across the North Umpqua River, upstream of the mouth of Steamboat Creek. The new crossing was intended to connect the North Umpqua Highway with a planned public park on the south side of the river and a truck trail extending from Steamboat. At that time, the North Umpqua Road connected Roseburg with Steamboat, while construction of the road eastward toward Diamond Lake was underway.

Preliminary studies for the new crossing considered four bridge types: a suspension bridge, a timber Howe truss, a two-hinged timber spandrel-braced arch, and a three-hinged timber spandrel-braced arch. The alternatives were evaluated in terms of cost, difficulty of erection, transportation of materials to the remote site, and aesthetic appearance. An arch was selected as the most suitable structure based on these criteria. The three-hinged design was chosen over the two-hinged alternative because its two halves could be assembled separately and raised into position by cableway, eliminating the need for falsework.

William D. Smith, an associate structural engineer at the United States Forest Service, was in charge of the design and construction of the bridge. The timber used in the Mott Bridge was select structural Douglas fir, treated with creosote at the Charles R. McCormick Lumber Company plant in St. Helens, Oregon. All joints were made using split-ring connectors. Civilian Conservation Corps (CCC) enrollees, who averaged 18 years of age and had no previous construction training, erected the bridge under the supervision of R. R. Krausse, the construction foreman.

The Mott Bridge under construction

A historical marker erected near the bridge by the National Association of CCC Alumni and the Umpqua National Forest credits CCC Company 703—based at Camp Steamboat—with constructing the bridge in 1935–1936. In his memoir, Robert H. Mercer recalled selecting and staking out the bridge site and designing and helping construct the pier on the south bank. (Note: At the time, Mercer was serving as a general foreman for construction work at CCC camps.) Construction of the bridge was reported as being about halfway complete in April of 1936. The structure was completed and opened in August of the same year.

The bridge was named after Lawrence Mott, an author and sportsman who first came to the area in 1929 and maintained a nearby fishing camp on the south side of the North Umpqua River, opposite the mouth of Steamboat Creek. After Mott's death in 1931, Clarence Gordon established a tent resort on the former camp site, which subsequently developed into the North Umpqua Lodge and became a popular destination for steelhead fly fishing. Before the Mott Bridge opened, visitors arriving on the north side of the river would ring a bell to summon a rowboat from the camp to ferry them and their baggage across the river. The stretch of the North Umpqua River used for this crossing became known as the "Boat Pool".

Resort operations at the North Umpqua Lodge ended in 1952. The United States Forest Service acquired the property in 1955 and established the Steamboat Ranger Station there. In addition to providing access to the ranger station from the North Umpqua Highway, the Mott Bridge also provides access to the Mott Trailhead on the North Umpqua Trail and a maintenance yard for the Oregon Department of Transportation, both of which are also located on the south side of the river.

The American Society of Civil Engineers designated Mott Bridge as an Oregon Historic Civil Engineering Landmark. A plaque marking the designation was installed near the west end of the bridge and dedicated in 1988. The bridge is the only surviving example of three such structures built during the Great Depression in the Pacific Northwest. It is also one of only two known timber deck arch bridges in Oregon.
