= Steamboat (disambiguation) =

A steamboat is a boat that is propelled primarily by steam power.

Steamboat may also refer to:

== Places in the United States ==
- Steamboat, Arizona
- Steamboat, Douglas County, Oregon
- Steamboat, Jackson County, Oregon
- Steamboat Springs, Colorado, often shortened to Steamboat
  - Steamboat Ski Resort
- Steamboat Springs (Nevada), the residential portions of which are known simply as Steamboat

== People ==
- Steamboat Johnson (1880–1951), an American baseball umpire
- Steamboat Struss (1909–1985), an American baseball pitcher
- Steamboat Williams (1892–1979), an American baseball player
- Steamboat Willie (musician) (born 1951), jazz/ragtime musician and band leader
- Ricky Steamboat (born 1953), an American wrestler
  - Vic Steamboat (born 1960), his brother, an American wrestler
  - Richie Steamboat (born 1987), his son, an American wrestler
- Sammy Steamboat (1934–2006), an American wrestler

== Other uses ==
- Steamboat (comics), a fictional character
- "Steamboat" (The Drifters song), 1955
- "Steamboat", a 1973 song by the Beach Boys from their album Holland
- Steamboat (food), a Chinese hot pot

== See also ==
- Steamboat Creek (disambiguation)
- Steamboat Mountain, the name of several mountains
- Steamboat River (disambiguation)
- Steamboat Springs (disambiguation)
- Steamboat Geyser, in Yellowstone National Park
- Steamboat Willie, a 1928 Disney cartoon
- Steamship, an ocean-going steam-powered vessel
