= Lawrence Mott =

American novelist

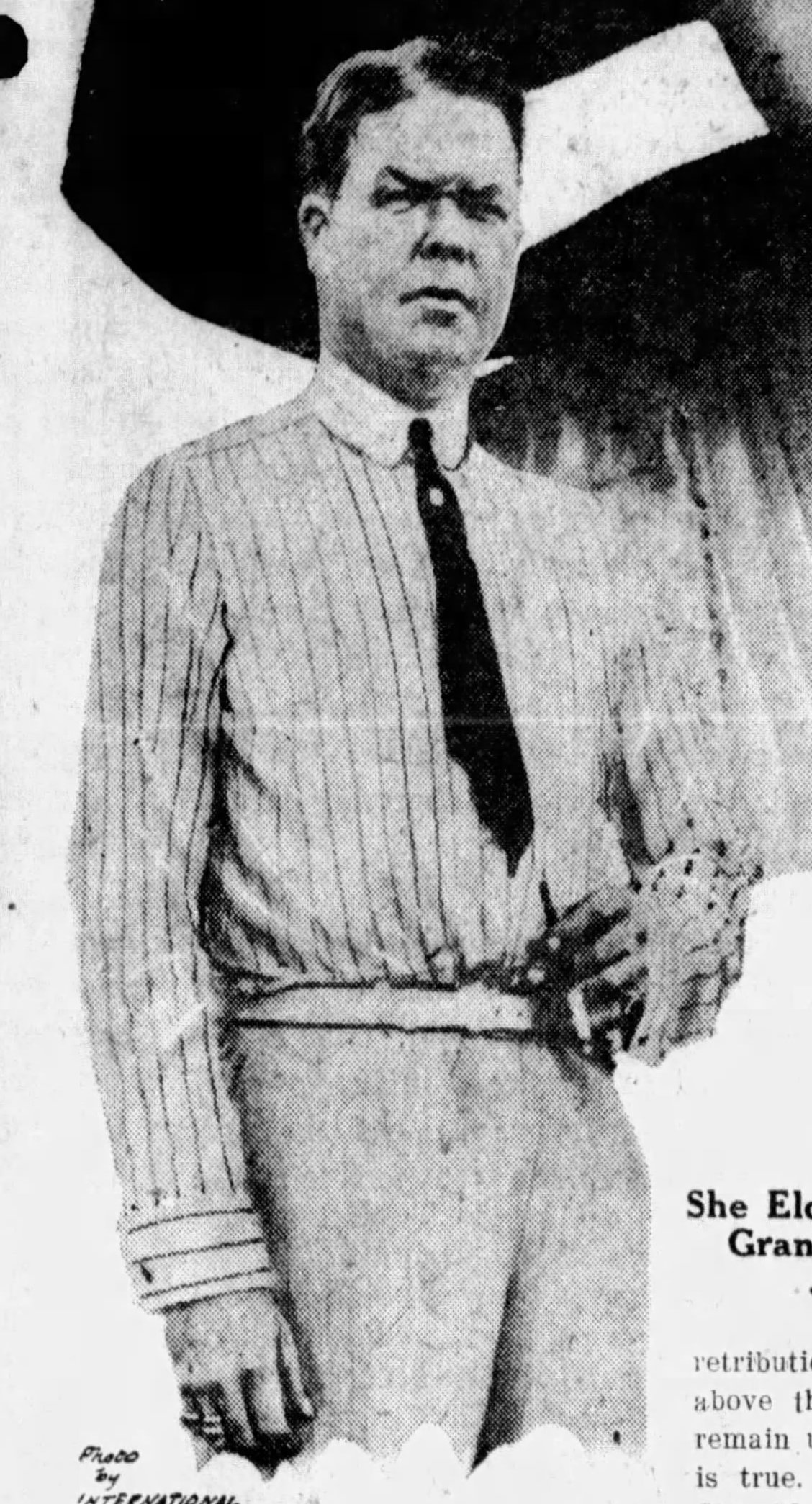
- Born: Jordan Lawrence Mott IV; August 15, 1881; New York City, U.S.
- Died: June 3, 1931 (aged 49); Douglas County, Oregon, U.S.
- Education: Harvard University
- Spouse(s): Carolyn Pitkin (divorced); Frances Hewitt

Jordan Lawrence Mott IV (1881–1931), often referred to as Jordan Lawrence Mott III and better known as Lawrence Mott, was an American novelist and writer on the outdoor life. He was the great-grandson of Jordan L. Mott (born 1799), who founded the J. L. Mott Iron Works in New York City. His grandfather was Jordan Lawrence Mott II (November 10, 1829 – July 26, 1915), and his father was Jordan Lawrence Mott III (May 13, 1857 – January 7, 1932).

Mott was born in New York City on August 15, 1881. After graduating from Harvard, he worked as a journalist, and married Carolyn Pitkin (1881–1967). In 1912 he sailed to China on a freighter, the Indrade, with opera singer, Mrs. Frances Hewitt Bowne: he was listed as purser and she was disguised as a cabin boy. Lawrence and Frances were living in Hong Kong when his father disinherited him. When World War One broke out, he enlisted in the U.S. Army Signal Corps and was commissioned Major. After the war, the couple moved to Santa Catalina Island, California where Lawrence wrote and became an early radio personality. The couple married in 1928 after their respective partners had divorced them. His published works include Jules of the Great Heart: "free" trapper and outlaw in the Hudson Bay region in the early days (1905), To the Credit of the Sea (1907), The White Darkness, and other stories of the Great North-West (1907), and Prairie, Snow and Sea (1910). He pioneered fishing for steelhead on the North Umpqua River, Oregon, and a bridge and a section of the North Umpqua Trail bears the name Mott in his memory. His love of the outdoor life led him to campaign for the conservation of wildlife and natural resources. He established a fishing camp near Steamboat Creek, where he died, of leukemia, on June 3, 1931.
