= Whitehorse Falls =

Coordinates: 43.24778°N 122.305°W

- Interactive map of Whitehorse Falls
- Location: Clearwater River
- Type: Plunge
- Elevation: 3,681 ft (1,122 m)
- Total height: 14 ft (4.3 m)
- Average flow rate: 75.0 cu ft/sec

Whitehorse Falls is a 14-foot (4.3 m) waterfall on the Clearwater River, in Douglas County in the U.S. state of Oregon. It is located within the Whitehorse Falls Campground, about 4 miles east of Toketee Lake along Oregon Route 138.

The falls are a featured point along the route between the cities of Chemult and Roseburg. It is located in the heart of the Umpqua National Forest. It consists of a recreational trail that leads to the waterfall, a short distance from the confluence of the North Umpqua and Clearwater rivers. The picnic area near the parking lot has a viewing platform. Access to the waterfall and its trail is only through U.S. Highway 138. The area around the waterfall is surrounded by moss-covered rocks and canopy of old growth Douglas fir forest.

== See also ==
- List of waterfalls in Oregon
