= Spring River (North Umpqua River tributary) =

- Location of the mouth of the Spring River in Oregon

Location
- Country: United States
- State: Oregon
- County: Douglas

Physical characteristics
- Source: Cascade Range
  - location: a spring complex on Pumice Flat, Umpqua National Forest
  - coordinates: 43°17′58″N 122°08′07″W
  - elevation: 4,255 ft (1,297 m)
- Mouth: North Umpqua River
  - location: upstream of Lemolo Lake
  - coordinates: 43°18′28″N 122°08′07″W
  - elevation: 4,157 ft (1,267 m)
- Length: 1.1 mi (1.8 km)
- Basin size: 25.5 sq mi (66 km^{2})

The Spring River is a short but significant tributary of the North Umpqua River in Douglas County in the U.S. state of Oregon. It begins at a spring complex in the Cascade Range on Pumice Flat in the Umpqua National Forest and flows 1.1 miles (1.8 km) north into the North Umpqua in Kelsay Valley, upstream of Lemolo Lake. Evidence suggests that nearby Thirsty Creek has an underground connection to the Spring River and that underground connections from other sources exist.

== Hydrology ==
The underground water feeding the springs emerges along the contact between glacial deposits and ash-flow deposits that form the bedrock. Although Spring River and other nearby spring-fed streams are short, their total water contribution to the North Umpqua is significant, especially during dry months.

Thirsty Creek is a perennial stream that flows on the surface upstream of Spring River but sinks underground about 0.5 miles (0.8 km) before reaching it. Even so, it appears likely to researchers that it is part of the same watershed and contributes to the Spring River flow. Evidence also suggests that below-surface connections from elsewhere feed into Spring River. The low-flow discharge at the mouth of the river was measured at 210 cubic feet per second (5.9 m^{3}/s) on August 10, 1997, more than Thirsty Creek alone could account for and more than half of the North Umpqua flow above Lemolo Lake.

== Fish ==
Spring River is a spawning ground for kokanee from Lemolo Lake and brown trout from the lake and the river. The river has good spawning gravels, a stable flow, and desirable temperatures for fish. The water from the springs emerges at 41 °F (5 °C) and warms to between 10 and 11 °C (50 and 52 °F) between source and mouth.

== See also ==
- List of rivers of Oregon
