= Toketee Falls =

Waterfall in Oregon, United States

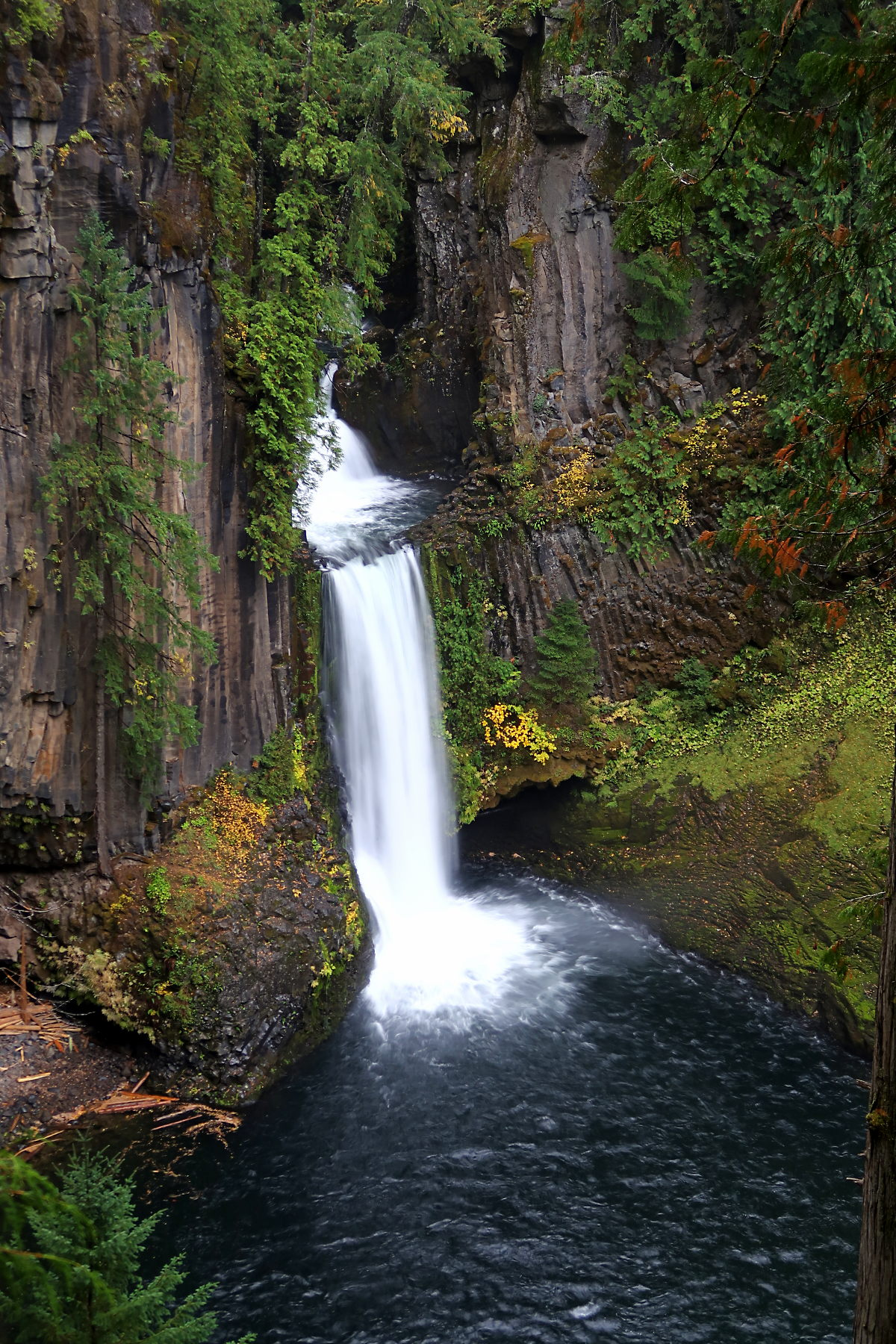
- Toketee Falls in 2019

- Location within Oregon
- Coordinates: 43°15′47″N 122°25′58″W

Toketee Falls is a waterfall in Douglas County, Oregon, United States, on the North Umpqua River at its confluence with the Clearwater River. It is located approximately 58 miles (93 km) east of Roseburg near Oregon Route 138, northwest of the North Entrance to Crater Lake. Toketee (pronounced TOKE-uh-tee), is a Chinook Jargon word meaning "pretty" or "graceful". The falls was officially named by a United States Board on Geographic Names decision in 1916, over alternate names Ireland Falls and Toketie Falls.

== Description ==
Carved from ancient columnar basalt, Toketee Falls drops approximately 120 feet (37 m) in two stages.

With a reliable water flow on the North Umpqua River, the falls avoids the seasonal fluctuations of other creek-fed waterfalls in Oregon.

== Hydropower plant ==
The waterfall is regulated by a dam built just upstream by PacifiCorp, which now regulates and reduces the water flow over the falls as part of the North Umpqua Hydroelectric Project. The damming forms a reservoir called Toketee Lake. Previously the full volume of the North Umpqua River was allowed to flow over the falls, but the flow has been reduced by a penstock that utilizes the drop of the falls to generate hydroelectricity.

== Post office ==
There was a Toketee Falls, Oregon post office from 1952 to 1956 during the construction of the PacifiCorp hydroelectric plant.

== See also ==
- List of waterfalls
- List of waterfalls in Oregon
