= Boulder Creek Wilderness =

Wilderness area in Oregon, United States

- IUCN category Ib (wilderness area)
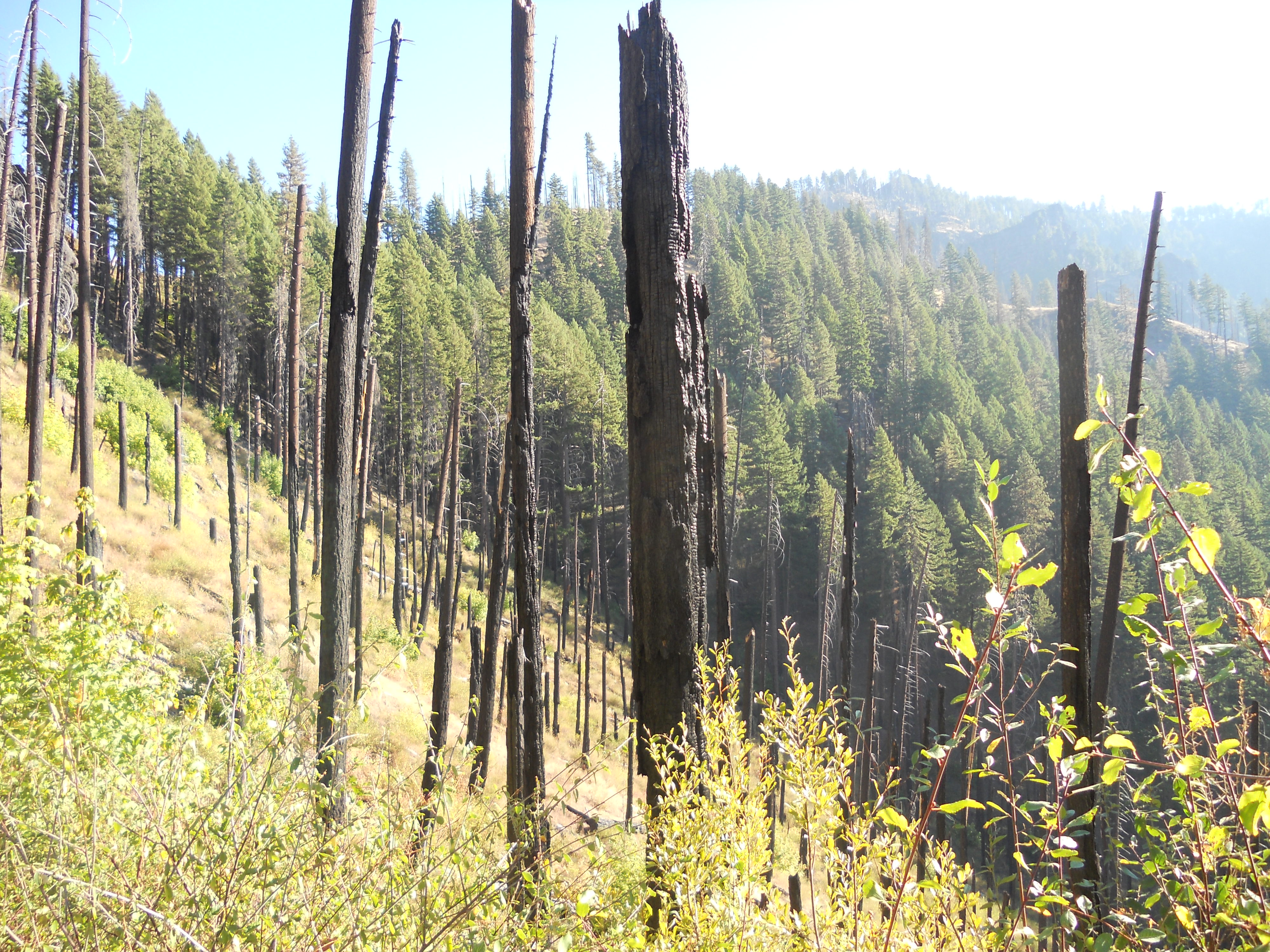
- Dead trees from a wildfire in the wilderness

- Location within the United States
- Location: Douglas County, Oregon, United States
- Nearest city: Glide, Oregon
- Coordinates: 43°21′00″N 122°31′00″W
- Area: 19,100 acres (7,729 ha)
- Established: 1984
- Governing body: United States Forest Service

The Boulder Creek Wilderness is a wilderness area located in the Umpqua National Forest in the southern Cascade Range of Oregon, United States. It was designated by the United States Congress in 1984 and comprises 19,100 acres (7,729 ha).

There is more than 30 miles (48 km) of hiking trails in the Wilderness, including the 10.6-mile (17.1 km) Boulder Creek Trail and the 3.5-mile (5.6 km) Jessie Wright segment of the North Umpqua Trail.

== Topography ==
Boulder Creek Wilderness ranges in elevation from 1,600 to 5,600 feet (490 to 1,710 m). It surrounds Boulder Creek, which flows south and west through the heart of the Wilderness and drains into the Wild and Scenic North Umpqua River.

== Geology ==
1,420 acres (5.7 km^{2}) of the Boulder Creek Wilderness is designated the Umpqua Rocks Special Interest Geologic Area. Large volcanic basalt and andesite monolithic spires with names such as Eagle Rock, Rattlesnake Rock, and Old Man are prominent landscape features. These spires are popular among rock climbers.

The geologic formations in this area date to the early Tertiary Period, some 30 million years ago. Volcanic intrusions, stocks, plugs and dikes were more common during this period of time. Later periods involved pyroclastic tuffs and breccias associated more with volcanic flows of andesite and dacite material.

== Vegetation ==
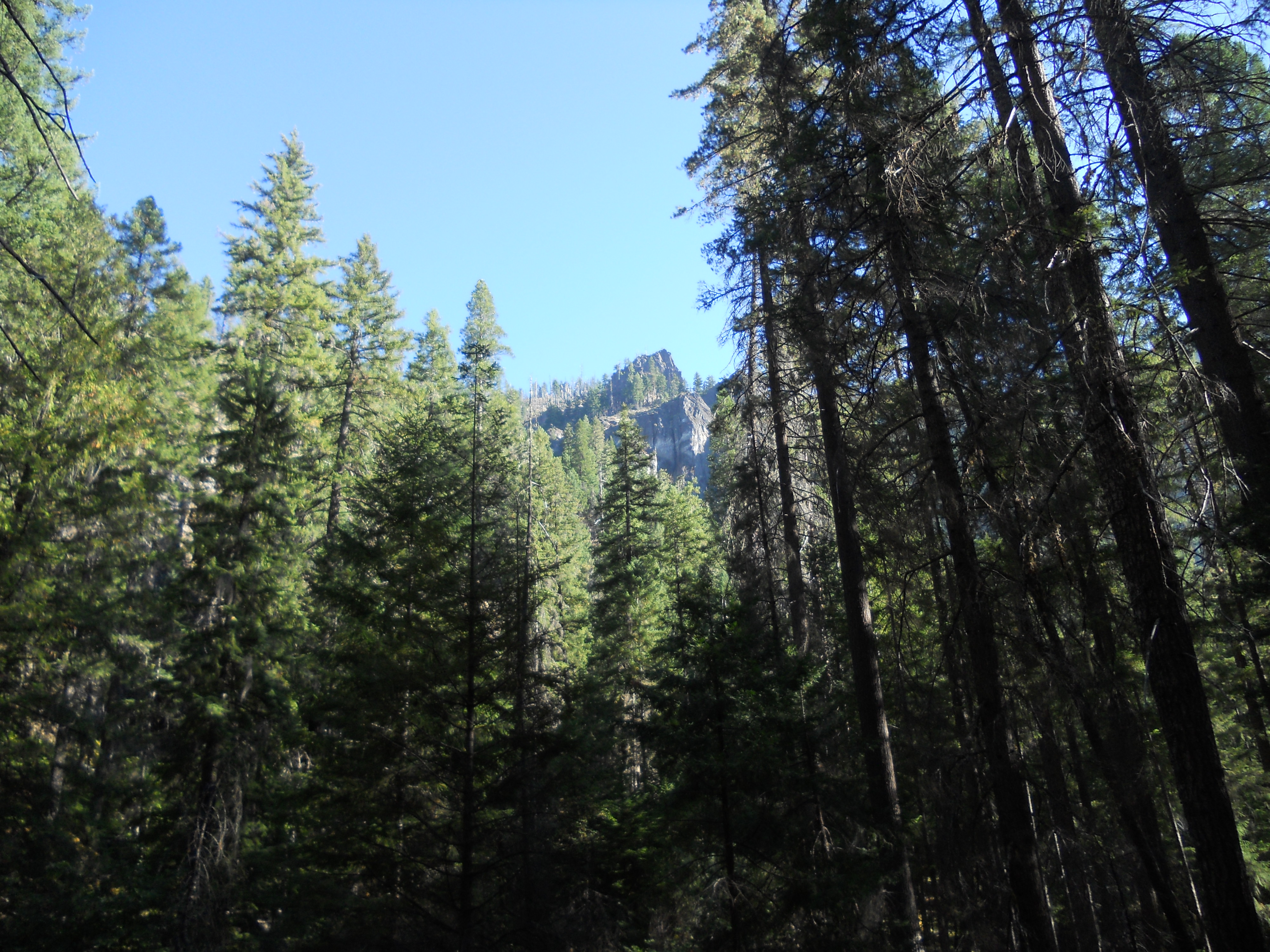
Douglas fir, sugar pine, and Ponderosa pine are found within the wilderness.

Old growth Ponderosa pines flourish on Pine Bench, near the lower end of Boulder Creek Wilderness. This is thought to be the largest such stand this far northwest of the crest of the Cascade Mountains. In 1996, the 16,500-acre (6,700 ha) Spring Fire burned through much of the Wilderness. Scientists have since been in the area studying the long-term ecological effects of the fire.

== See also ==
- List of old growth forests
- List of Oregon Wildernesses
- List of U.S. Wilderness Areas
