= Lemolo Lake =

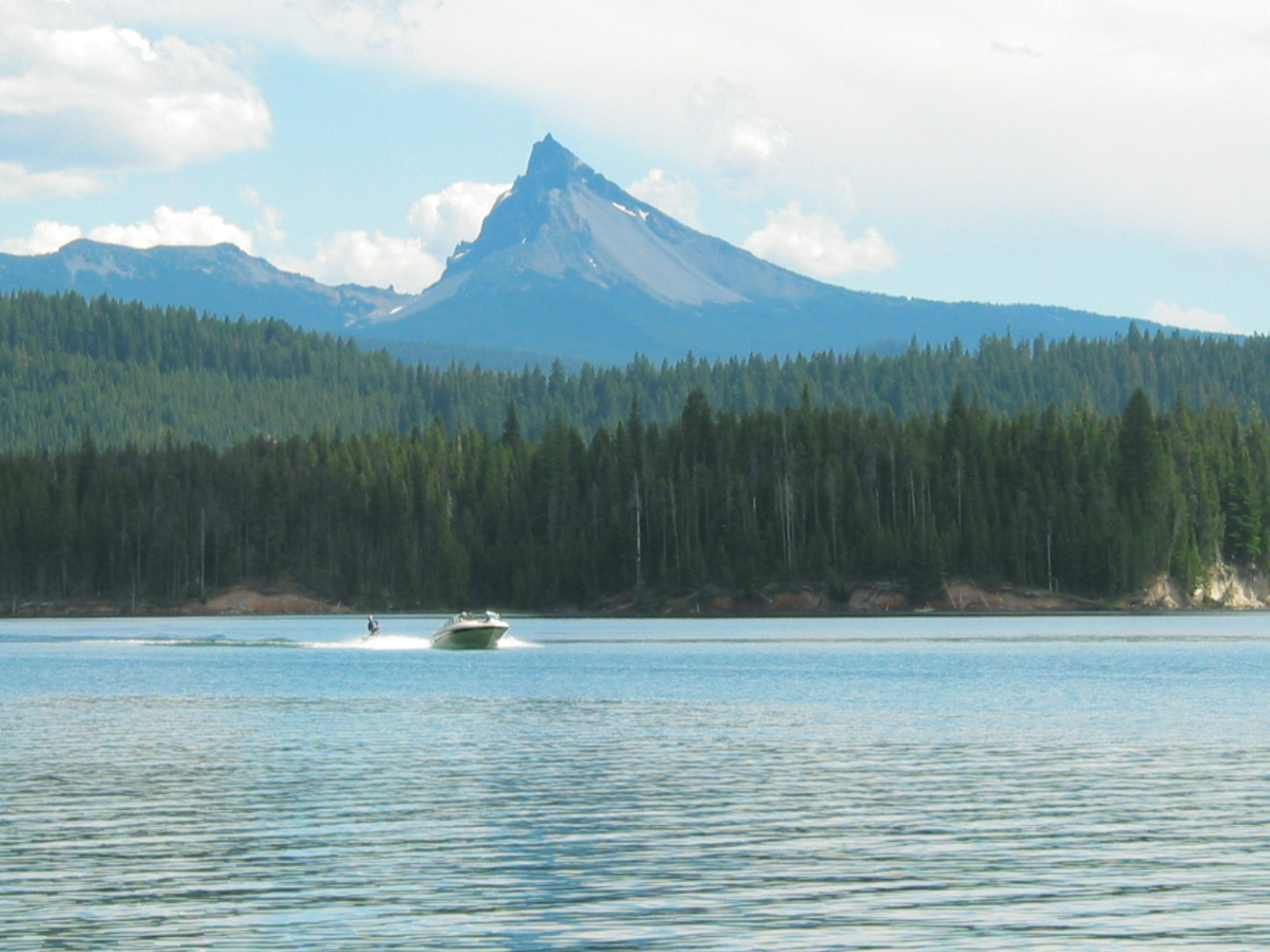
- A boat tows a water skier on Lemolo Lake. Mount Thielsen is in the background.

- Location within Oregon Location within the United States
- Location: Douglas County, Oregon
- Coordinates: 43°18′47″N 122°11′05″W
- Type: reservoir

Lemolo Lake (ləmolo--Chinook Jargon for "wild" or "untamed") is a small lake and reservoir in Douglas County, Oregon in the Umpqua National Forest 30 miles (48 km) north of Crater Lake National Park, on the North Umpqua River. It is part of the Diamond Lake Ranger district, and is administered by the United States Forest Service.

== History ==
Before the 1880s, the area around Lemolo Lake was used mainly by the Native American groups. It was not until the 1880s that white settlers began to use the area extensively as grazing land for sheep. The first land-use reform came in 1908 when the McGowan, Kelsay Valley, and Dog Prairie Allotments allowed for regulated grazing in the areas around Lemolo and Diamond Lakes. While development continued in the vicinity of Diamond Lake throughout the 20th century, the land around Lemolo Lake remained relatively untouched with the exception of the building of the North Umpqua road in 1939 (later replaced by Hwy. 138 in 1964), the installation of telephone lines between 1909 and 1965, the construction of the two Lemolo dams from 1952–1956, and periodic timber harvesting or replanting from the 1950s through the 1990s. Cabins and the only store were built at Lemolo Lake between 1963 and 1984.

The reservoir was formed by the construction of two hydroelectric dams, Lemolo #1 (120 feet (37 m) high, completed in 1955) and Lemolo #2 Forebay (30 feet (9.1 m) high, dating from 1956). Together, they generated 65 megawatts. Both are part of the larger North Umpqua Hydroelectric Project, located entirely within the Umpqua National Forest, and owned and operated by PacifiCorp.

== Location and geography ==
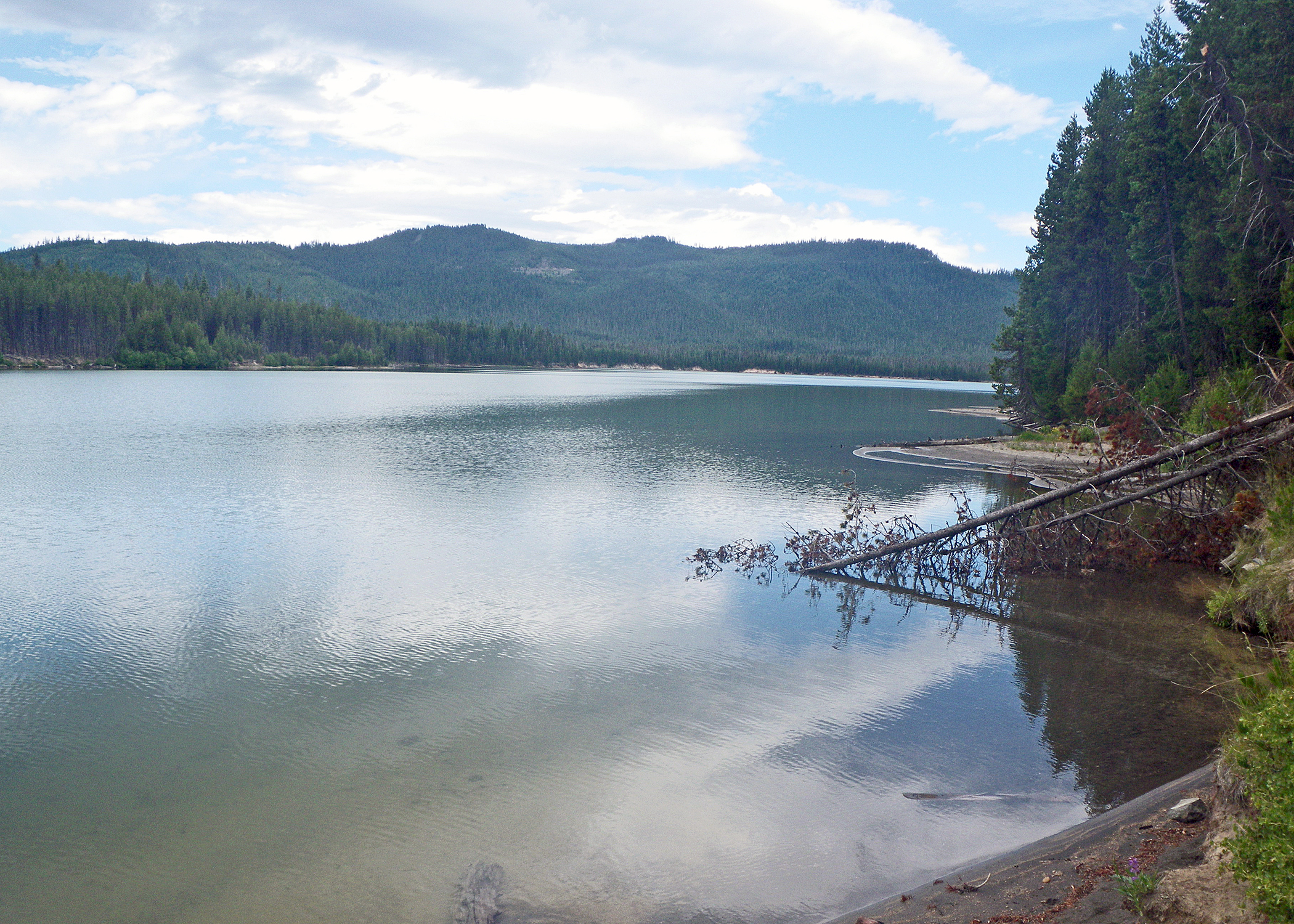
Lemolo Lake in July 2012

Lemolo Lake is situated at approximately 4,150 feet (1,260 m) above sea level in the eastern region of the Umpqua National Forest. It forms the tip of a triangle of lakes formed by Lemolo Lake to the north, Diamond Lake to the south, and Miller Lake to the southeast. Unlike nearby Diamond Lake, Lemolo Lake is isolated and serviced only by National Forest Development Roads. There are excellent views of Mt. Bailey and Mt. Thielsen, as well as Cinnamon Butte (all of which are located to the south of Lemolo Lake).

=== Climate ===
Climate data for Lake Lemolo, California, 1991–2023 normals, extremes 1978–present
| Month | Jan | Feb | Mar | Apr | May | Jun | Jul | Aug | Sep | Oct | Nov | Dec | Year |
|---|---|---|---|---|---|---|---|---|---|---|---|---|---|
| Record high °F (°C) | 63 (17) | 71 (22) | 72 (22) | 86 (30) | 97 (36) | 101 (38) | 99 (37) | 101 (38) | 101 (38) | 91 (33) | 72 (22) | 67 (19) | 101 (38) |
| Mean daily maximum °F (°C) | 41.3 (5.2) | 43.3 (6.3) | 46.9 (8.3) | 51.9 (11.1) | 62.9 (17.2) | 70.2 (21.2) | 80.7 (27.1) | 80.7 (27.1) | 73.8 (23.2) | 60.1 (15.6) | 46.6 (8.1) | 39.8 (4.3) | 57.9 (14.4) |
| Daily mean °F (°C) | 33.1 (0.6) | 34.3 (1.3) | 37.0 (2.8) | 41.0 (5.0) | 49.2 (9.6) | 55.9 (13.3) | 63.8 (17.7) | 63.4 (17.4) | 57.5 (14.2) | 47.3 (8.5) | 37.8 (3.2) | 32.2 (0.1) | 46.0 (7.8) |
| Mean daily minimum °F (°C) | 25.0 (−3.9) | 25.2 (−3.8) | 27.2 (−2.7) | 30.1 (−1.1) | 36.3 (2.4) | 41.6 (5.3) | 47.0 (8.3) | 46.1 (7.8) | 41.2 (5.1) | 34.4 (1.3) | 28.8 (−1.8) | 24.6 (−4.1) | 34.0 (1.1) |
| Record low °F (°C) | −5 (−21) | −10 (−23) | 1 (−17) | 5 (−15) | 19 (−7) | 25 (−4) | 30 (−1) | 28 (−2) | 23 (−5) | 17 (−8) | 2 (−17) | −17 (−27) | −17 (−27) |
| Average precipitation inches (mm) | 9.35 (237) | 6.79 (172) | 6.94 (176) | 6.00 (152) | 4.00 (102) | 2.49 (63) | 0.78 (20) | 0.71 (18) | 1.93 (49) | 5.00 (127) | 9.14 (232) | 11.66 (296) | 64.79 (1,644) |
| Average snowfall inches (cm) | 36.1 (92) | 37.2 (94) | 29.4 (75) | 16.3 (41) | 2.2 (5.6) | 0.1 (0.25) | 0.0 (0.0) | 0.0 (0.0) | 0.0 (0.0) | 2.7 (6.9) | 23.5 (60) | 49.1 (125) | 196.6 (499.75) |
Source: NOAA

== Recreation ==
=== Summer ===
The lake is a popular camping and fishing spot during the summer months and boasts four forest service campgrounds and Lemolo Lake KOA which has RV and Tent sites and 7 full service cabins. The most popular activities during the summer include fishing for trout, swimming, hiking and water skiing. Personal watercraft are also allowed on the lake, however the marina does not offer speed-boats or jet-skis, so water skiers must provide their own.

=== Health notices ===
During the summer months, there can be blue-green algae blooms, which may be harmful to health. These blooms do not occur every year, nor do they occur at the same time of year. Visitors should check with the USFS for advisory warnings about water conditions before making the trip. Efforts have succeeded in recent years to curb the algae growth in Lemolo Lake and nearby Diamond Lake. These efforts have coincided with the removal of invasive fish species such as the Tui Chub. In 2009, the algae level was 300,000 cells per millimeter, down from the millions of cells measured in prior years.

=== Winter ===
Lemolo Lake's cabins and camping areas are open from late April-Mid October.

== See also ==
- List of lakes in Oregon
