= Dread and Terror Ridge =

Ridge in Oregon, United States

Coordinates: 43.3459563°N 122.2567045°W

Dread and Terror Ridge is a ridge in Douglas County, Oregon, in the United States. It is approximately 4 miles (6.4 km) long, with an elevation of 4,629 ft (1,411 m), and lies south of the North Umpqua River. A segment of the North Umpqua Trail takes it name from the ridge.

The ridge was named in 1908 from the great number of whitethorn brush there.
