= Steamboat, Jackson County, Oregon =

Unincorporated community in the state of Oregon, United States

- Unincorporated community
- Location within Oregon Location within the United States
- Coordinates: 42°04′32″N 123°12′18″W
- Country: United States
- State: Oregon
- County: Jackson
- Elevation: 2,503 ft (763 m)
- Time zone: UTC-8 (Pacific (PST))
  - Summer (DST): UTC-7 (PDT)
- GNIS feature ID: 1150371
- Coordinates and elevation from Geographic Names Information System

Steamboat is an unincorporated community in Jackson County, Oregon, United States. It lies along Carberry Creek, a tributary of the Applegate River, in the Rogue River – Siskiyou National Forest. Slightly west of Steamboat is the Jackson–Josephine county border, and the border with California is about 6 miles (10 km) to the south.

According to Oregon Geographic Names (OGN), the name Steamboat derives from a mining term, "steamboated", meaning worked out or not up to expectations. Steamboat Mine is slightly northeast of Steamboat. The community had a post office named Steamboat that operated from 1888 to 1915.

Other geographic features in the state have been similarly named, for example Steamboat Mountain near Steamboat and Steamboat Creek in the Calapooya Mountains. The creek is associated with another unincorporated community named Steamboat in Douglas County.
