= Maidu Lake =

Lake in Oregon, United States

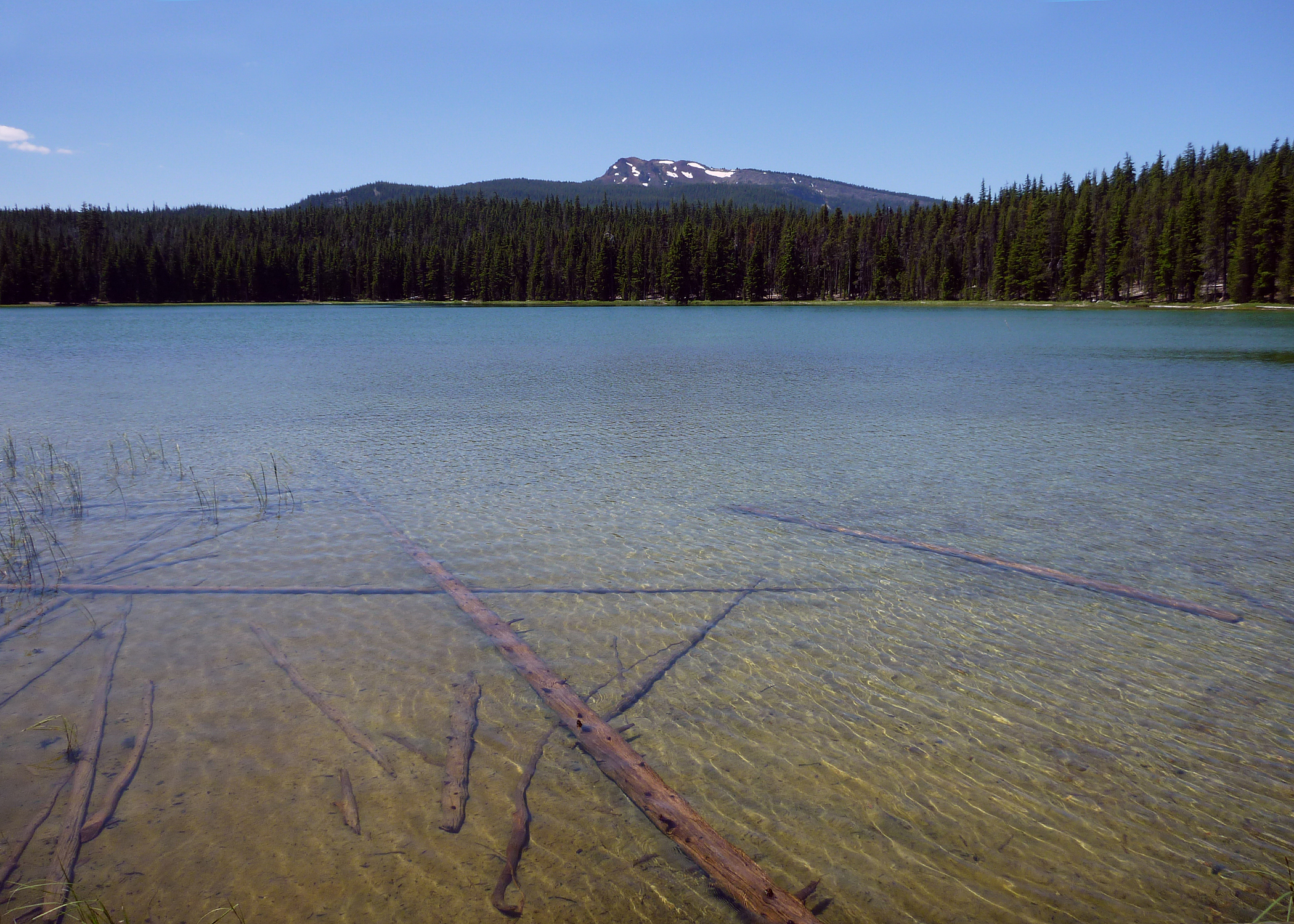

- Location within Oregon Location within the United States
- Location: Douglas County, Oregon
- Coordinates: 43.2546939°N 122.0006616°W
- Primary outflows: North Umpqua River
- Basin countries: United States
- Surface area: 20 acres (8.1 ha)
- Average depth: 12 feet (3.7 m)
- Surface elevation: 5,984 feet (1,824 m)

Maidu Lake is a small natural freshwater lake in the Cascade Range in eastern Douglas County in the U.S. state of Oregon. It is in the Mount Thielsen Wilderness of the Umpqua National Forest, about 15 miles (24 km) west of the community of Chemult.

The lake, at 5,984 feet (1,824 m) above sea level, is the source of the North Umpqua River. The eastern terminus of the 79-mile (127 km) North Umpqua Trail, which follows the river, is at Maidu Lake. A 4.7-mile (7.6 km) connecting trail continues east, intersecting the Pacific Crest Trail between Maidu Lake and Miller Lake.

Maidu Lake supports brook trout ranging in size to upwards of 16 inches (41 cm). The lake is periodically re-stocked by volunteers, who bring in hatchery fingerlings by horseback.

== See also ==
- List of lakes in Oregon
