= Steamboat Springs =

Steamboat Springs may refer to:

- Steamboat Springs, Colorado, U.S., a city
  - Steamboat Springs Airport
  - Steamboat Springs High School
- Steamboat Springs (Nevada), U.S., a volcanic field with extensive geothermal activity

== See also ==
- Steamboat Geyser, in Yellowstone National Park
- Steamboat (disambiguation)
- Spring (disambiguation)
