= Mount Thielsen Wilderness =

Wilderness area in Oregon, U.S.

- IUCN category Ib (wilderness area)
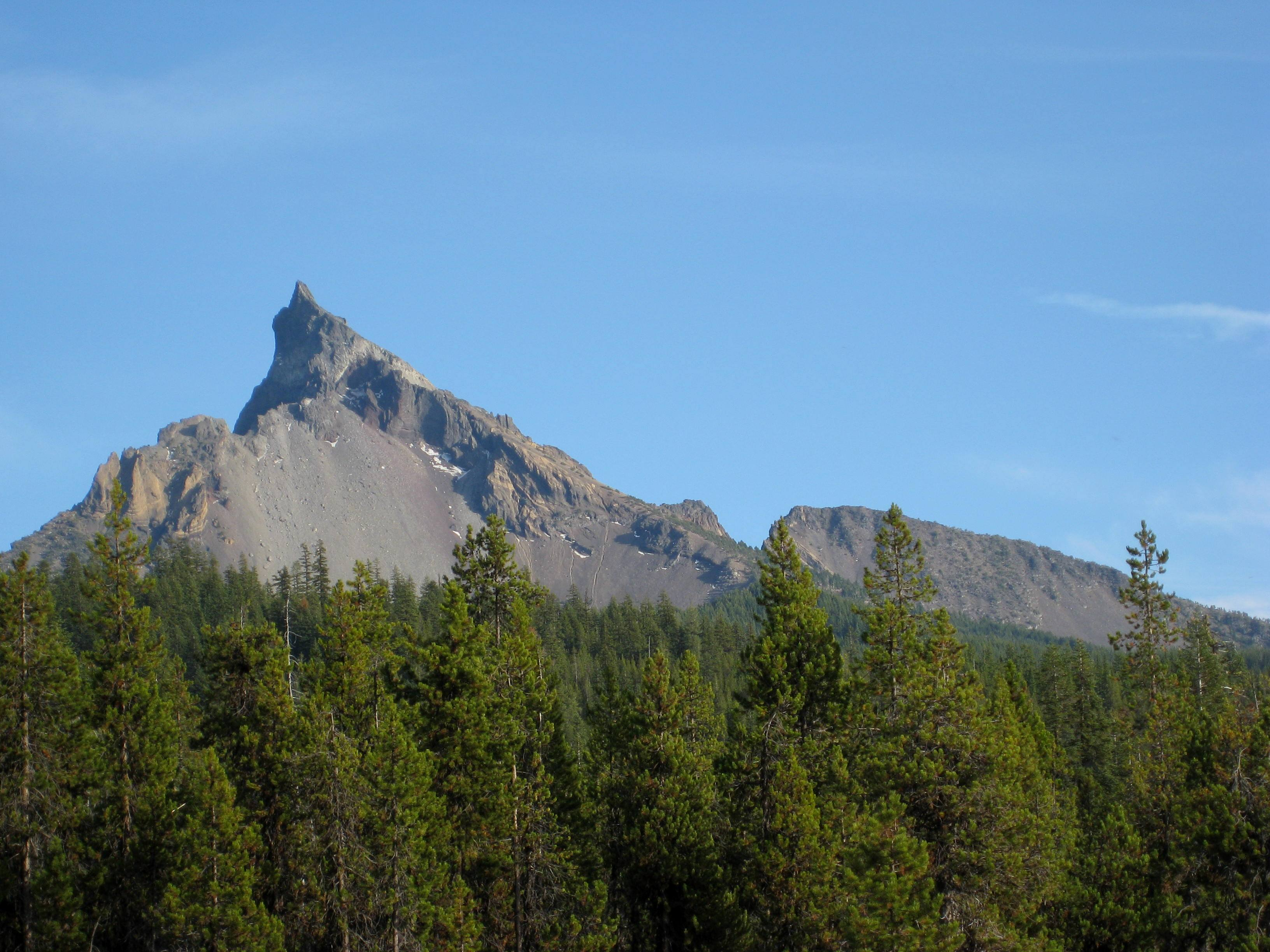
- Mount Thielsen in October
- Interactive map of Mount Thielsen Wilderness
- Location: Klamath / Douglas counties, Oregon, United States; Deschutes / Umpqua / Fremont–Winema national forests
- Nearest city: Chemult, Oregon
- Coordinates: 43°12′30″N 122°00′45″W
- Area: 55,100 acres (22,300 ha)
- Established: 1984
- Governing body: United States Forest Service

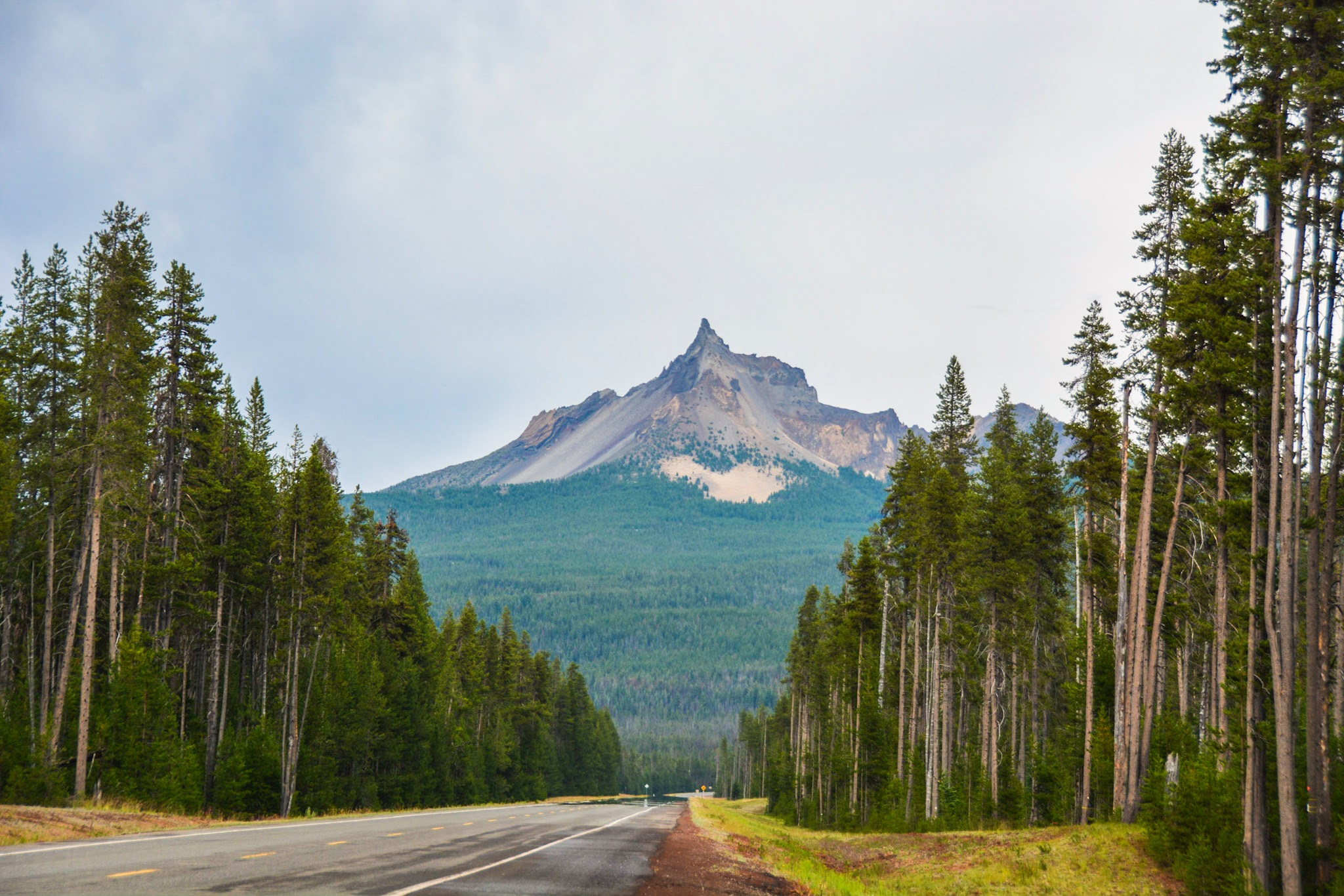
Mount Thielsen, Oregon

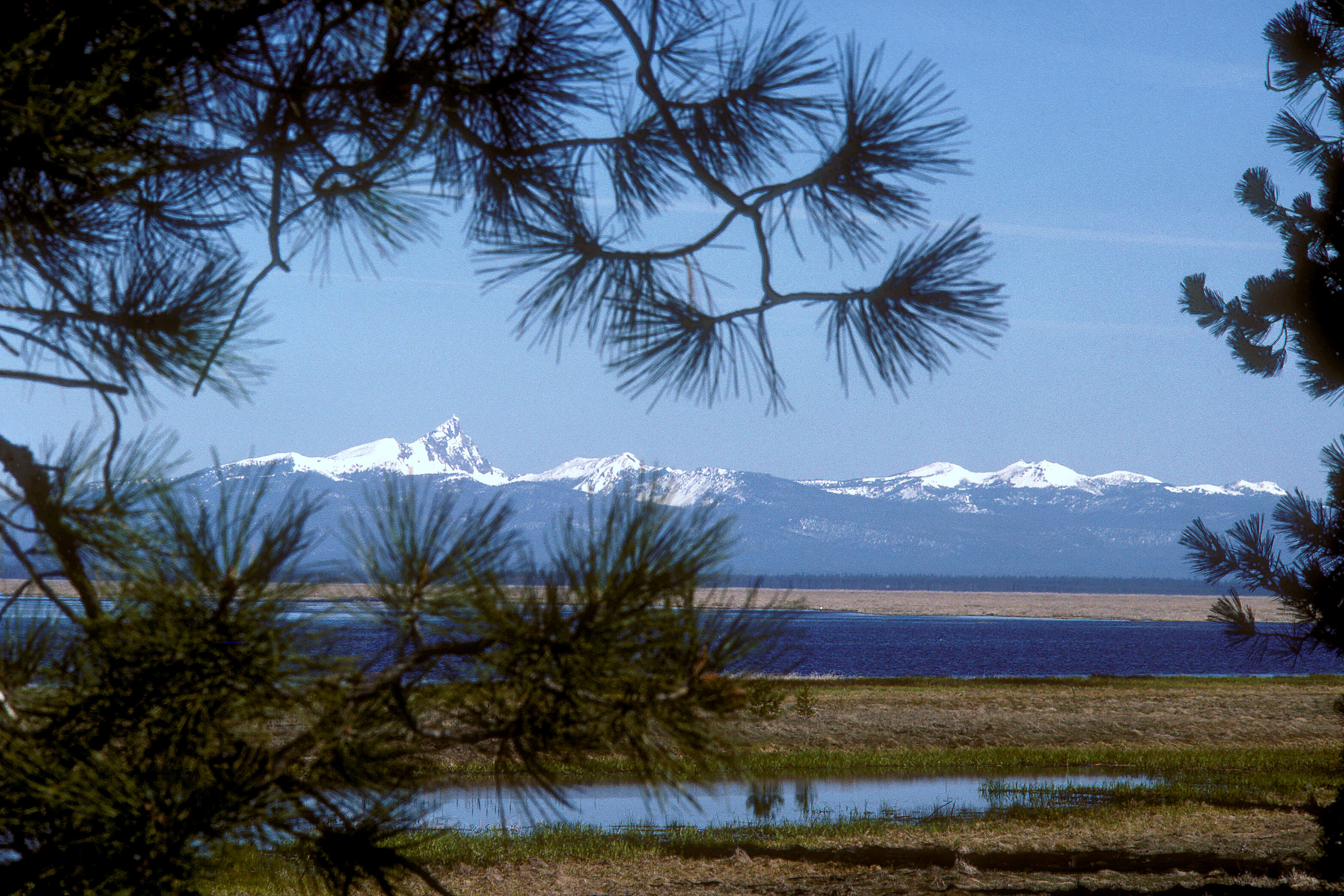
Mount Thielsen's pointy summit from Klamath Marsh National Wildlife Refuge

The Mount Thielsen Wilderness is a wilderness area located on and around Mount Thielsen in the southern Cascade Range of Oregon in the United States. It is located within the Deschutes, Umpqua, and Fremont–Winema national forests. It was established by the United States Congress in 1984 and comprises 55,100 acres (22,300 ha).

== Topography ==
The Mount Thielsen Wilderness ranges in elevation from 5,000 feet (1,500 m) above sea level to 9,182 feet (2,799 m) at the summit of Mount Thielsen. The mountain was carved by glacial activity and is sometimes referred to as the "Lightning Rod of the Cascades". To the south of the wilderness is Crater Lake National Park. The rest of the wilderness consists of flat and moderately rolling hills, which change to very steep and sharply dissected ridges toward the crest of the Cascade Mountains.

Popular lakes in the wilderness include Lake Lucille and Maidu Lake. The headwaters of the Wild and Scenic North Umpqua River are at Maidu.

== Vegetation ==
Lodgepole pine dominate the lower portion of the Mount Thielsen Wilderness. A forest of mountain hemlock and fir grows at higher elevations, up to the timberline at about 7,200 feet (2,200 m).

== Recreation ==
Primary recreational activities in the Mount Thielsen Wilderness include camping, hiking, wildlife watching, and rock climbing. There are approximately 78 miles (126 km) of hiking trails in the wilderness, including a 26-mile (42 km) portion of the Pacific Crest Trail.

== See also ==
- List of Oregon Wildernesses
- List of U.S. Wilderness Areas
- List of old growth forests
- Wilderness Act
