= Jordan L. Mott =

American entrepreneur (1799–1866)

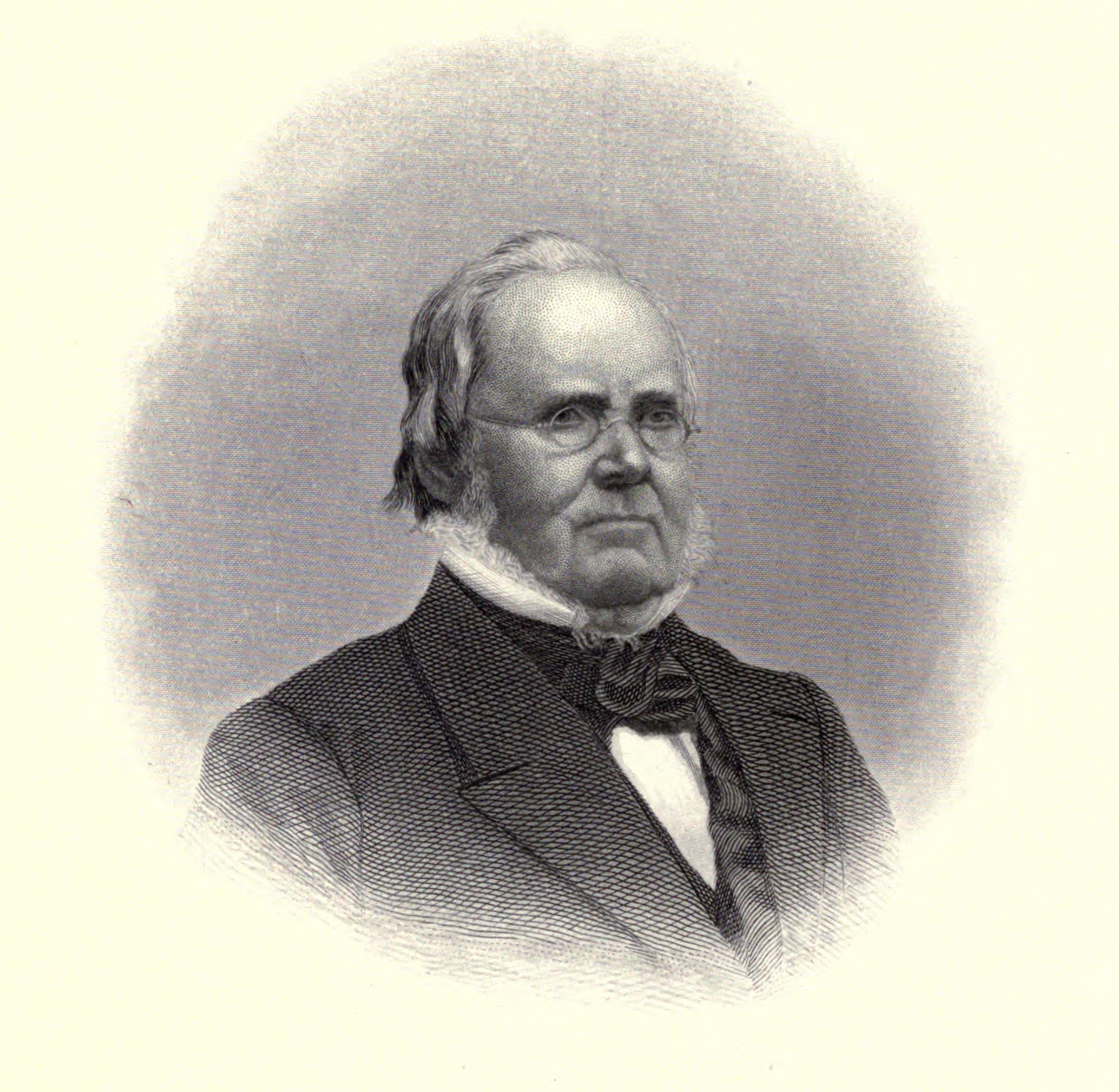
- Born: 12 October 1799; Manhasset
- Died: 8 May 1866 (aged 66); New York City
- Resting place: Green-Wood Cemetery
- Children: Jordan Lawrence Mott Jr.

Jordan Lawrence Mott (1799 — 1866) was an American inventor and industrialist. He established the J. L. Mott Iron Works in New York City.

His father was Jacob Mott, an alderman of New York in 1804-1810 and at one time acting mayor of the city, after whom Mott Street was named. Jacob's wife was related to James Lawrence, a naval officer in the War of 1812. The family are said to be descended from Adam Mott from Essex, England, who arrived in the United States before 1647.

Mott's son (1829 — 26 July 1915) was Jordan Lawrence Mott Jr, and was married to Marianna Seaman, who died in 1898. He followed his father as President of the foundry business and was described at his death as "for many years a notable figure in the life of the city". His son Jordan Lawrence Mott III (born 13 May 1857 – 7 January 1932) married Katherine Jerome Purdy.

Mott's great-grandson Major Jordan Lawrence Mott, IV (commonly referred to as Jordan Lawrence Mott III) (1881–1931), was also known as Lawrence Mott, and was a novelist and writer on the outdoor life.

== Men of Progress painting ==
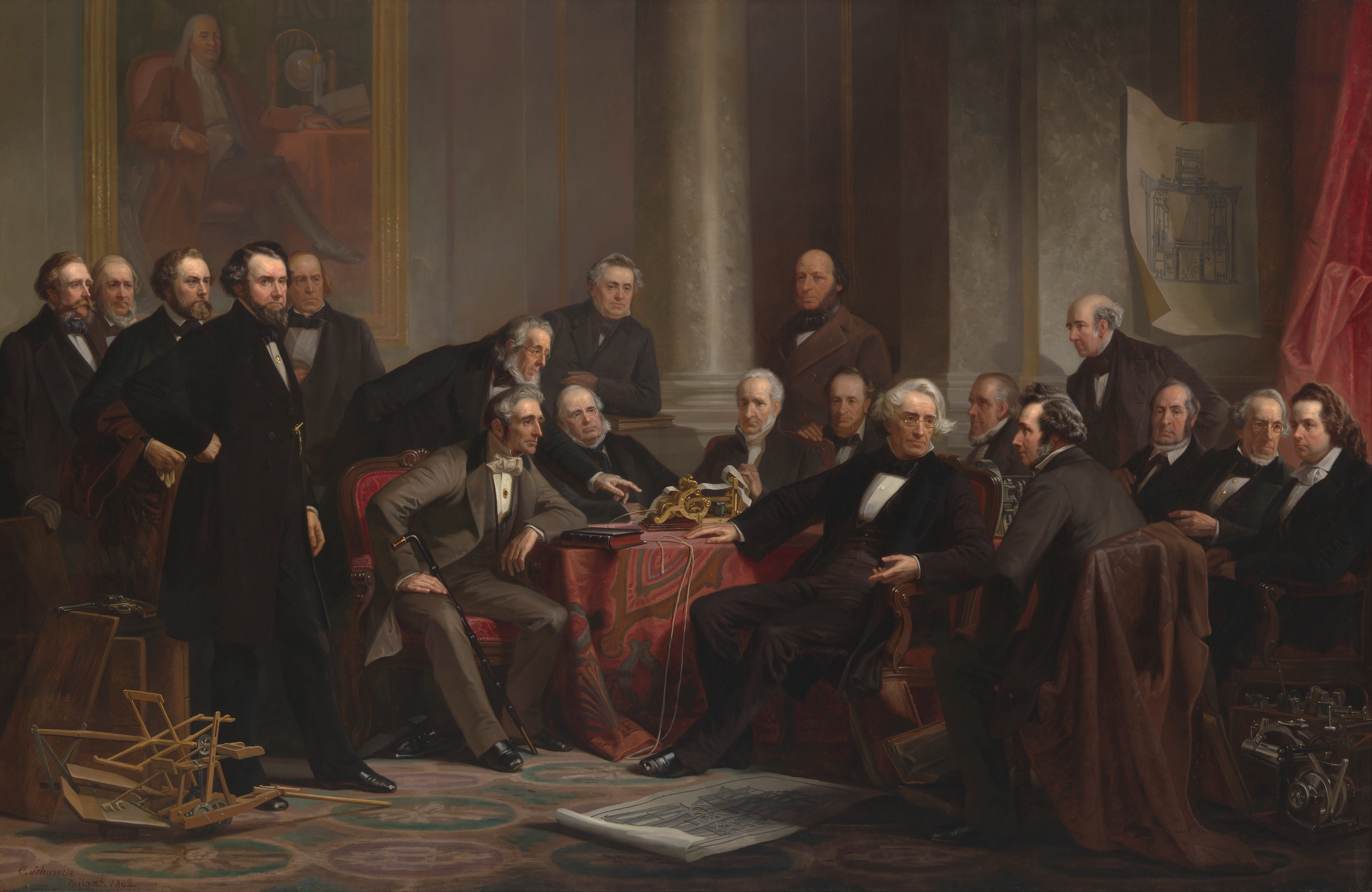

In 1857 Mott commissioned Christian Schussele to paint a 6 ft by 4 ft work entitled Men of Progress, representing himself and 18 other contemporary American inventors. They never gathered together to pose, but sat for the artist individually. The picture is now owned by the Cooper Union, with a copy by John Sartain in the American National Portrait Gallery. Jordan Mott is the eighth person from the left, seated at the table.
