= Clearwater River (Oregon) =

River in Douglas County, Oregon, United States

Coordinates: 43.2629°N 122.418653°W

The Clearwater River is a river in Douglas County of the U.S. state of Oregon. It is a roughly 15-mile (24 km) long tributary of the North Umpqua River, located about 50 miles (80 km) east of Roseburg in the Cascade Range.

There are two notable waterfalls along the river. Upstream is Clearwater Falls, and downstream a few miles is Whitehorse Falls, the smaller of the two.

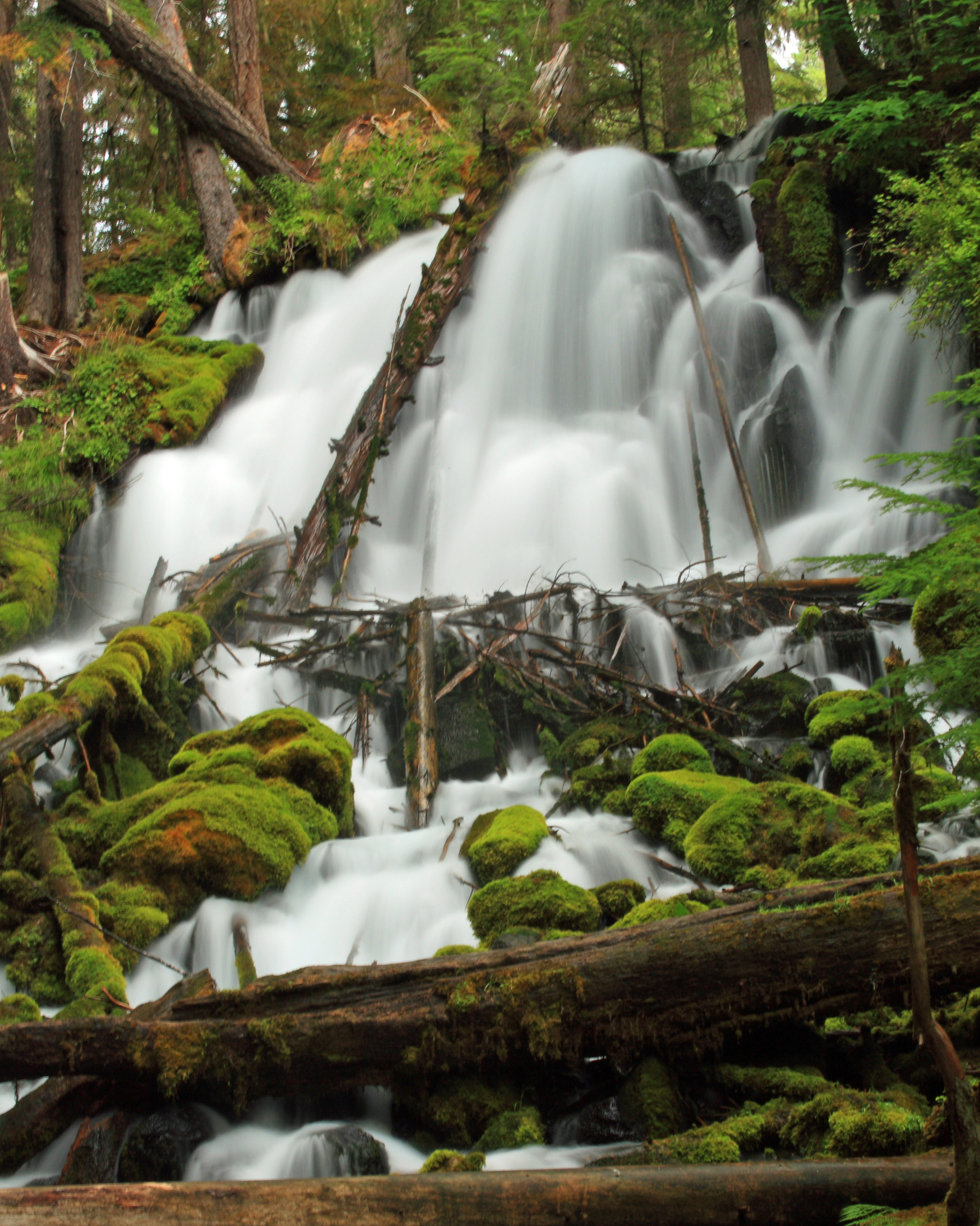
Clearwater Falls

coordinate	USGS map
	Toketee Falls
	Fish Creek Desert
	Garwood Butte
	Lemolo Lake
	Diamond Lake

== See also ==
- List of rivers of Oregon
