= North Umpqua Trail =

Trail in Douglas County, Oregon

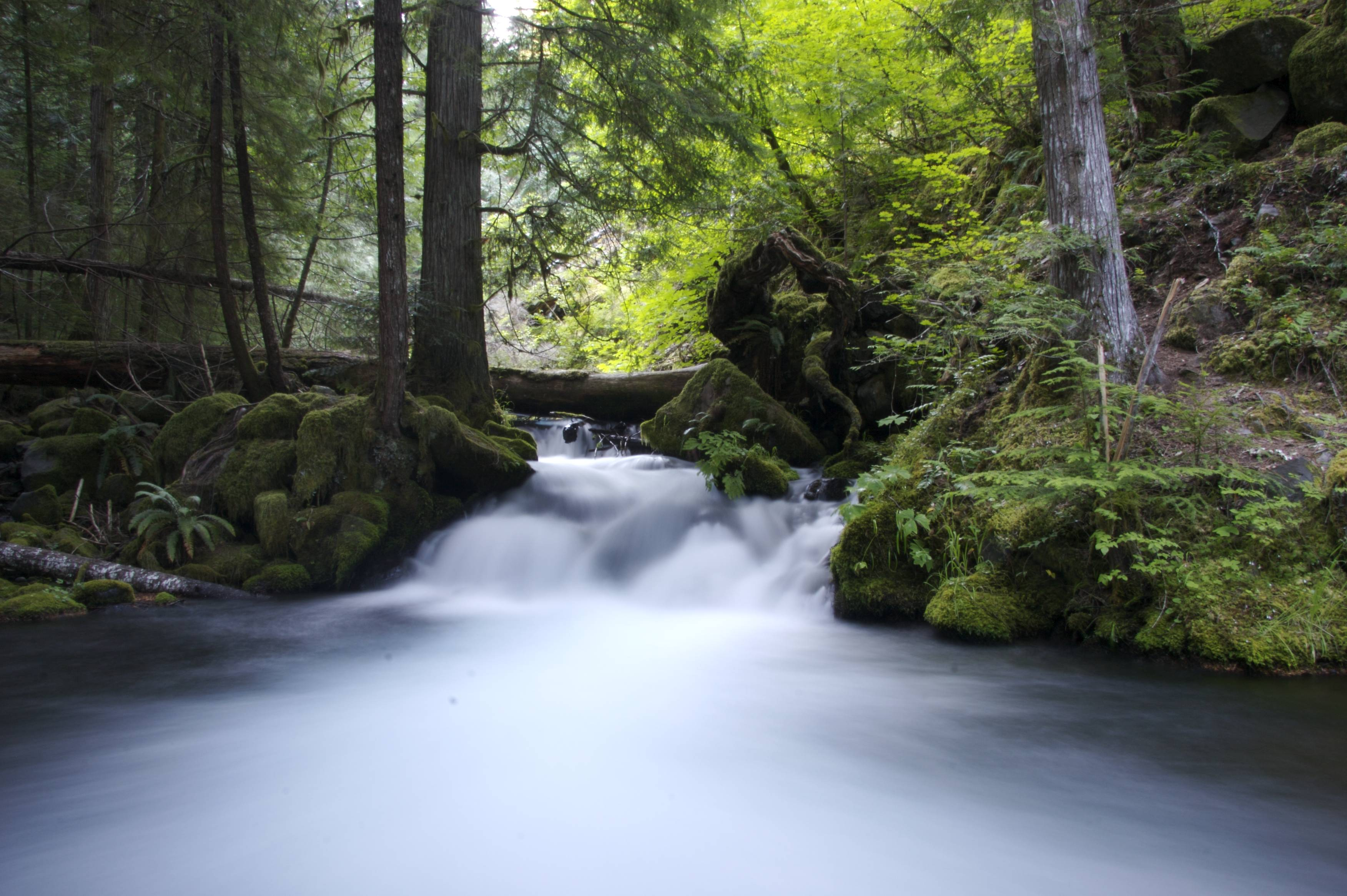
- View of a small waterfall on the Dread and Terror Section of the North Umpqua Trail
- Length: 79 mi (127 km)
- Location: Douglas County, Oregon, United States
- Trailheads: Swiftwater; Tioga; Wright Creek; Mott; Panther; Calf; Marsters; Soda Springs; Toketee Lake; Hot Springs; White Mule; Kelsay Valley; Digit Point
- Use: Hiking; Horse riding Mountain biking
- Elevation change: 4,200 ft (1,300 m)
- Highest point: Maidu Lake, 6,000 ft (1,800 m)
- Lowest point: Swiftwater Trailhead
- Difficulty: Easy to difficult
- Months: Lower Sections Open Year Round; Upper Sections Late April to Late September
- Sights: North Umpqua River; Cascade Range
- Hazards: Severe weather Dehydration; Wildlife; Poison oak

The North Umpqua Trail is a multi-use trail open for hiking, mountain biking and horse-back riding that follows the North Umpqua River in Southern Oregon, United States. The trail is about 79 miles (127 km) long. It is broken up into 12 segments, ranging from 3.5 to 13 miles (21 km) in length. The trail ranges in elevation from 800 feet (240 m) to about 6,000 feet (1,800 m). Three segments of the trail—Maidu Lake, Mott, and Tioga—have been designated National Recreation Trails.

== Route ==
The North Umpqua Trail is a designated National Recreation Trail and follows the North Umpqua River as it winds west out of the Cascades and towards the city of Roseburg, Oregon. The trail is inside the Roseburg District BLM and Umpqua National Forest lands and closely follows the river for most of its length. It has been designated by the International Mountain Bicycling Association as an 'Epic Ride', an honor bestowed on only a handful of trails around the world.

| point | coord | notes |
|---|---|---|
| Swiftwater County Park | 43.32764°N 123.00353°W | western end, near Deadline Falls |
| Fern Creek Falls | 43.31909°N 122.98924°W | bridge creek crossing with view of falls and North Umpqua |
| Bob Butte flank | 43.29776°N 122.95461°W | highest point on Bob Butte, elevation approx. 1700 ft of 2300+ |
| east end of Tioga segment | 43.32536°N 122.79462°W | joins Mott segment |
| Maidu Lake | 43.255°N 121.99972°W | eastern end, near Pacific Crest Trail |
