= Steamboat River =

Steamboat River may refer to:

- Steamboat River (Cass County, Minnesota), a stream
- Steamboat River Township, Hubbard County, Minnesota, a civil township
