= North Umpqua Hydroelectric Project =

Hydroelectric project in Douglas County, Oregon, U.S.

Coordinates: 43.2753°N 122.4502°W

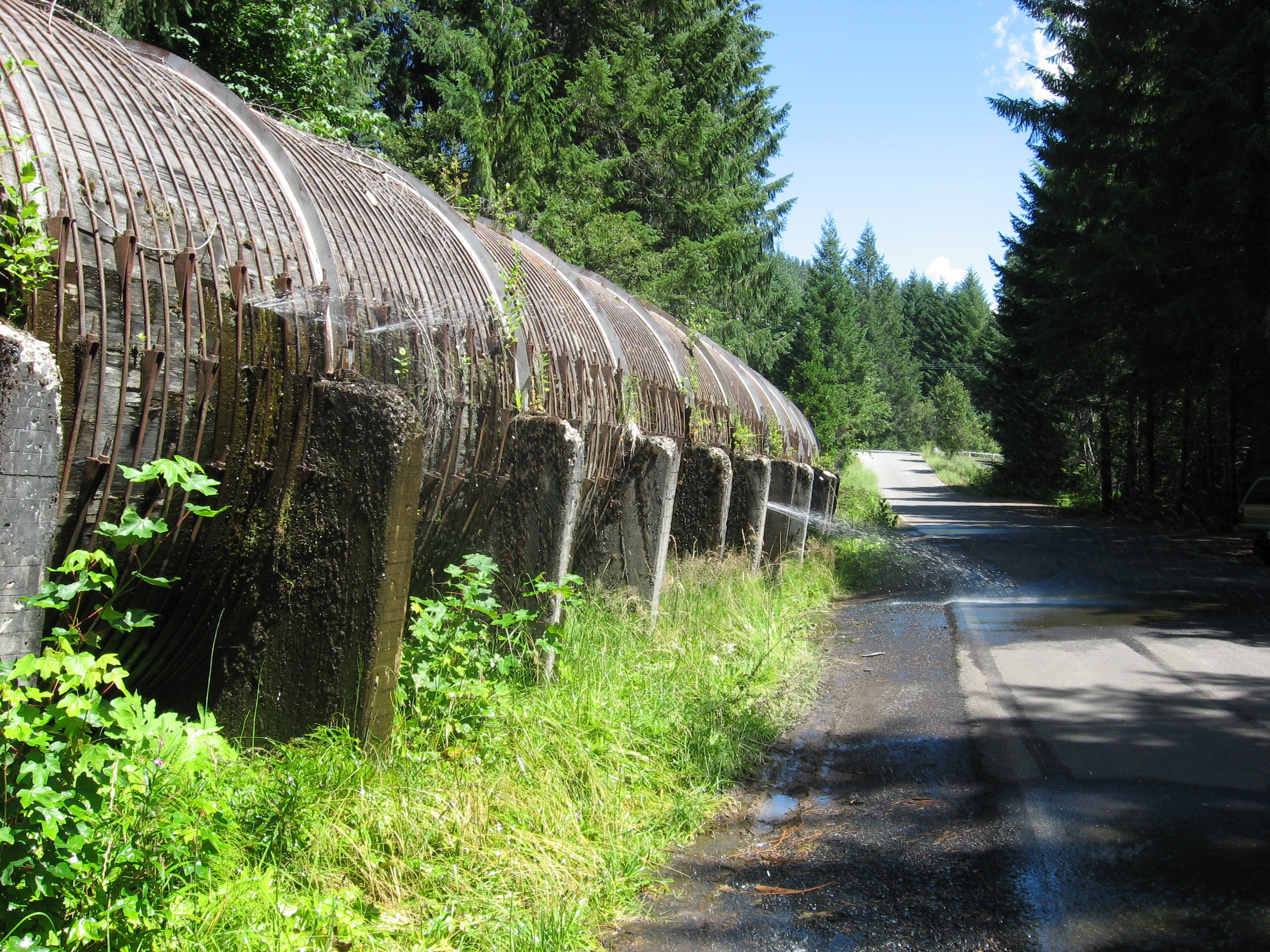
A section of project pipeline near Toketee Falls

The North Umpqua Hydroelectric Project is a series of hydroelectric power generation facilities along the North Umpqua River in Douglas County, Oregon, United States. The project is owned and operated by PacifiCorp.

== History ==
The project was constructed by PacifiCorp between 1947 and 1956. The original federal license to operate the project was issued in 1947 for a period of 50 years, expiring in 1997. A settlement agreement to renew the license was approved in 2001 after prolonged negotiations between PacifiCorp and numerous state and federal agencies.

== Description ==
The project consists of eight dams, three reservoirs, and a system of canals, flumes, penstocks and tunnels.

Conservationists have criticized the hydroelectric facilities for their impact on the ecology of the North Umpqua River watershed. Particular focus has been placed on the Soda Springs Dam, which restricts salmon and steelhead from swimming to spawning grounds upstream. A fish ladder allowing the fish upstream passage was completed in 2012 at a cost of $60 million.
