= Steamboat Creek =

Steamboat Creek may refer to:

- Steamboat Creek (Nevada), United States
- Steamboat Creek (Oregon), United States
- Steamboat Creek (South Carolina), United States
