= Steamboat Mountain =

The USGS GNIS lists 12 mountains in the United States named Steamboat Mountain:

Name	USGS link	State	County	USGS map	Coordinates
Steamboat Mountain		Arizona	Pinal	Hayden	33°05′51″N 110°51′56″W
Steamboat Mountain		Arizona	Coconino	Powell Plateau	36°21′55″N 112°23′57″W
Steamboat Mountain		California	Placer	Wentworth Springs	39°06′40″N 120°21′10″W
Steamboat Mountain		California	Siskiyou	Little Shasta	41°41′57″N 122°28′17″W
Steamboat Mountain		Colorado	Boulder	Lyons	40°14′10″N 105°17′03″W
Steamboat Mountain		Montana	Gallatin	Ramshorn Peak	45°10′50″N 111°03′35″W
Steamboat Mountain		Montana	Lewis and Clark	Steamboat Mountain	47°17′11″N 112°33′47″W
Steamboat Mountain		Nevada	Pershing	Trego	40°51′02″N 119°13′26″W
Steamboat Mountain		Oregon	Wheeler	Johnson Heights	44°42′51″N 119°47′42″W
Steamboat Mountain		Oregon	Jackson	Carberry Creek	42°05′28″N 123°12′24″W
Steamboat Mountain		Texas	Taylor	Lake Abilene	32°10′09″N 099°56′15″W
Steamboat Mountain		Texas	Kimble	The Falls	30°28′36″N 099°22′07″W

Steamboat Mountain is also the name of a school.
