= Steamboat, Douglas County, Oregon =

Unincorporated community in the state of Oregon, United States

Coordinates: 43.345398°N 122.735608°W

Steamboat is an unincorporated community in Douglas County, Oregon, United States. It is located about 39 miles east of Roseburg on Oregon Route 138, near the confluence of the North Umpqua River with Steamboat Creek within the Umpqua National Forest.

The name "Steamboat" was probably first applied to the creek sometime before the 1890s by area gold miners, after a term referring to disappointing mining claims. There is no evidence any actual steamboats navigated the river at this locale.
