= Steamboat Creek (Umpqua River tributary) =

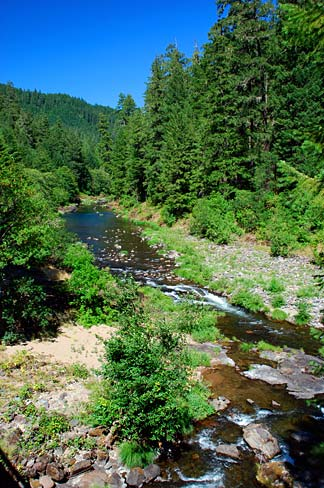
Steamboat Creek

Steamboat Creek is a short tributary of the North Umpqua River in southwestern Oregon in the United States. Approximately 35 kilometres (22 mi) long, the creek is located on a remote part of the upper North Umpqua in the Calapooia Mountains west of the Cascade Range. It rises in southeastern Lane County at 43.5601214°N 122.5519948°W and flows southwest to join the North Umpqua from the north at Steamboat.

The North Umpqua and its tributaries renowned for its prolific runs of summer steelhead, including a high percentage of native fish. Steamboat Creek has been closed to fishing since 1932.

The watershed of the creek was extensively clearcut during the late 1950s and 1960s until forestry practices were changed. The recovery of the river, including the anadromous fish population is closely monitored as a test case for riparian habitat management.
