= North Umpqua River =

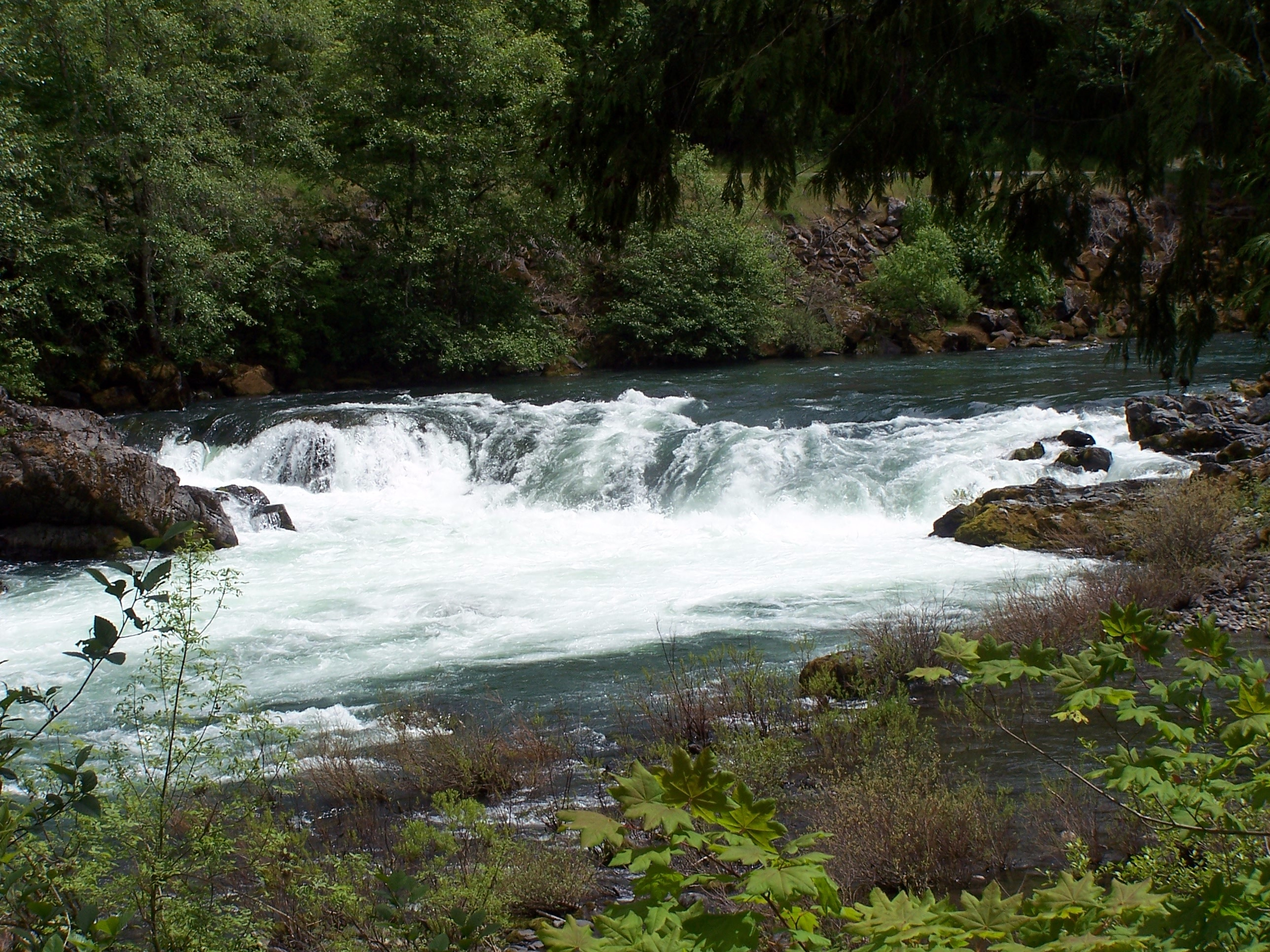
- Deadline Falls on the North Umpqua River

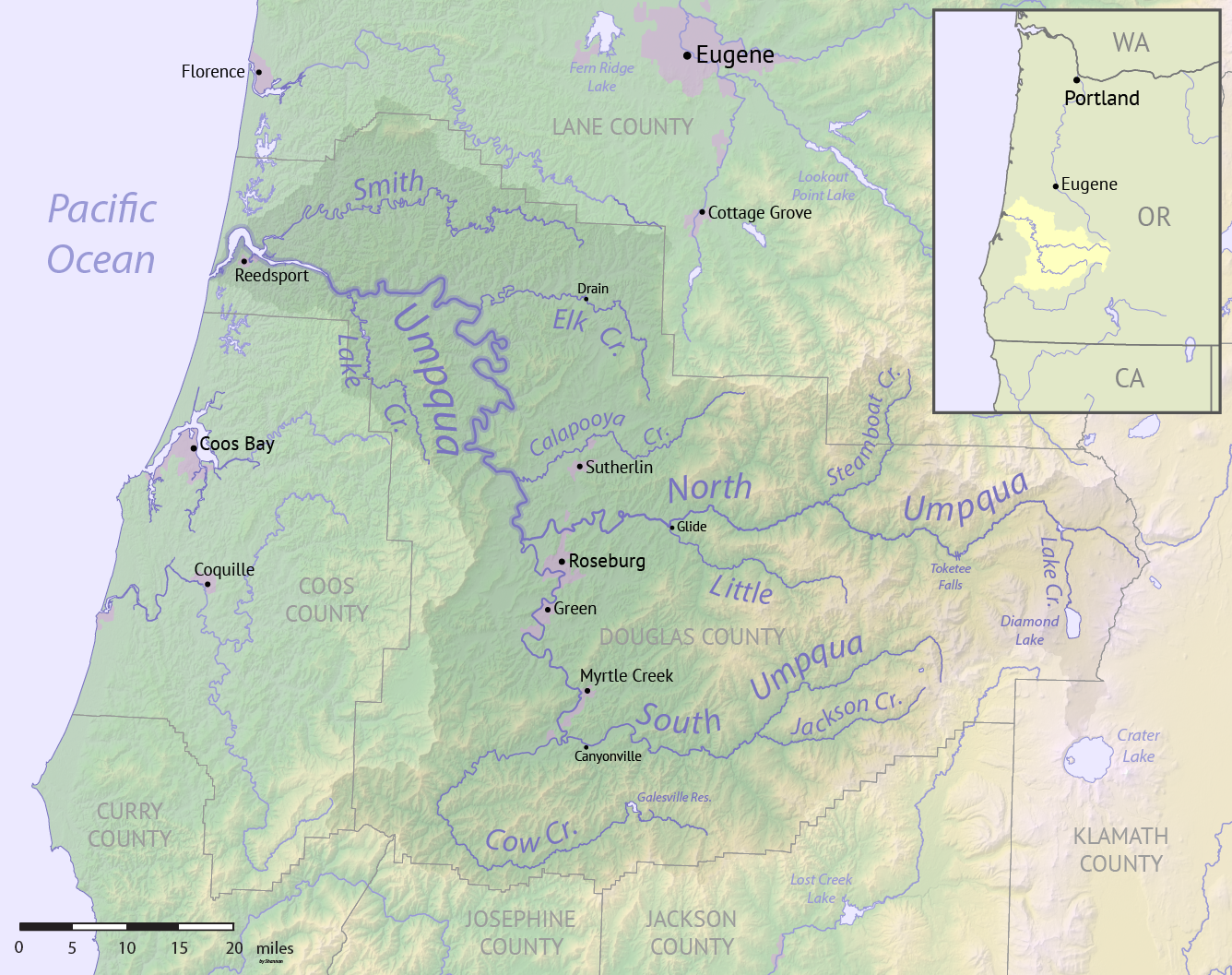
- Map of the Umpqua River watershed

- Location of the mouth of the North Umpqua River in Oregon

Location
- Country: United States
- State: Oregon
- County: Douglas

Physical characteristics
- Source: Maidu Lake
  - location: Cascade Range
  - coordinates: 43°15′17″N 122°00′02″W
  - elevation: 5,998 ft (1,828 m)
- Mouth: Confluence of the North Umpqua and South Umpqua rivers
  - location: near Roseburg
  - coordinates: 43°16′05″N 123°26′45″W
  - elevation: 361 ft (110 m)
- Length: 106 mi (171 km)
- Basin size: 1,356 sq mi (3,510 km^{2})
- Discharge
  - location: Winchester
  - average: 3,687 cu ft/s (104.4 m^{3}/s)
  - minimum: 235 cu ft/s (6.7 m^{3}/s)
  - maximum: 150,000 cu ft/s (4,200 m^{3}/s)

National Wild and Scenic River
- Type: Recreational
- Designated: October 28, 1988

The North Umpqua River is a tributary of the Umpqua River, about 106 miles (171 km) long, in southwestern Oregon in the United States. It drains a scenic and rugged area of the Cascade Range southeast of Eugene, flowing through steep canyons and surrounded by large Douglas-fir forests. Renowned for its emerald green waters, it is considered one of the best fly fishing streams in the Pacific Northwest for anadromous fish.

== Description ==
It rises in the high Cascades, issuing from Maidu Lake at elevation of 5,998 feet (1,828 m) in the Mount Thielsen Wilderness, along the Douglas-Klamath county line approximately 70 miles (113 km) east of Roseburg. It follows a serpentine course down from the Cascades, westward along the southern side of the Calapooya Mountains. Its upper course passes through the Umpqua National Forest, past Toketee Falls and Steamboat, where it receives Steamboat Creek from the north. It receives the Little River from the south at Glide (the confluence is known as the Colliding Rivers) and joins the South Umpqua from the east approximately 5 miles (8 km) northwest of Roseburg to form the Umpqua.

Facilities of the North Umpqua Hydroelectric Project are located along the river. It is impounded in its upper reaches in the Cascades to form Lemolo Lake for hydroelectricity. It is also impounded for hydroelectricity at Soda Springs Dam, forming a small reservoir on the upper river.

The river's reputation as a world-class steelhead stream and its famous emerald waters are a result of the fact the river source is high enough in the Cascades to derive from snowmelt during the entire year. The melting snow is trapped in volcanic soil and pumice and released during the summer months, providing an even cool-temperature flow. During the summer the flow of the river is approximately 20 times that of the nearby South Umpqua. In its lower reaches, the river's flow becomes increasingly erratic, in a manner typical of mountain streams of the region.

The region around the river has long been a timber-producing area. Starting in 1955, the watershed of the river was extensively clear cut, a practice which continued until 1969 when forestry management practices were changed. During this period many tributary streambeds were used as impromptu logging roads. The recovery of the river from these practices has been closely monitored by state and federal agencies.

== Recreation ==
In 1988, the United States Congress designated 33.8 miles (54.4 km) of the river between the Soda Springs Powerhouse and Rock Creek as wild and scenic under the National Wild and Scenic River program. Angling on this part of the river, frequented by salmon and steelhead, is limited to fly fishing.

On the North Umpqua, rafters and kayakers find whitewater challenges from Class I (easy) through IV (advanced) on the International Scale of River Difficulty from May through the summer months. The North Umpqua Trail, which runs parallel to the river, supports hiking and biking.

== Tributaries ==
Named tributaries of the North Umpqua River from source to mouth are Tolo and Bradley creeks and Spring River, then Lake, Poole, White Mule, Warm Spring, Nancy, Beverly, Helen, Norma, Dorothy, and Sally creeks. Then Potter, Nurse, Barkenburger, Patricia, Alvin, Charlia, Loafer, and Deer creeks, followed by the Clearwater River and Fish, Medicine, Boulder, Eagle, and Copeland creeks.

Below that come Dark Canyon, Wilson and Deception creeks, Dry Gulch, and Dry, Happy, Calf, Dog, Limpy, Apple, Jack, Redman, Steamboat, Alder, Fisher, Williams, and Timber creeks. Further downstream are Archie, Cougar, Bogus, John, Wright, Raspberry, Fairview, Fall, and Thunder creeks. Then Burnt, Swamp, Fox, Cole, Susan, Hogback, Bob, Honey, Clay, Hill, Rock, Britt, Old Hatchery, and French creeks. Little River is next, followed by Fordice, Huntley, Cooper, Oak, Clover, Dixon, and Sutherlin creeks.

== See also ==
- List of rivers of Oregon
- List of longest streams of Oregon
- List of National Wild and Scenic Rivers
