= Umpqua National Forest =

United States national forest in Oregon

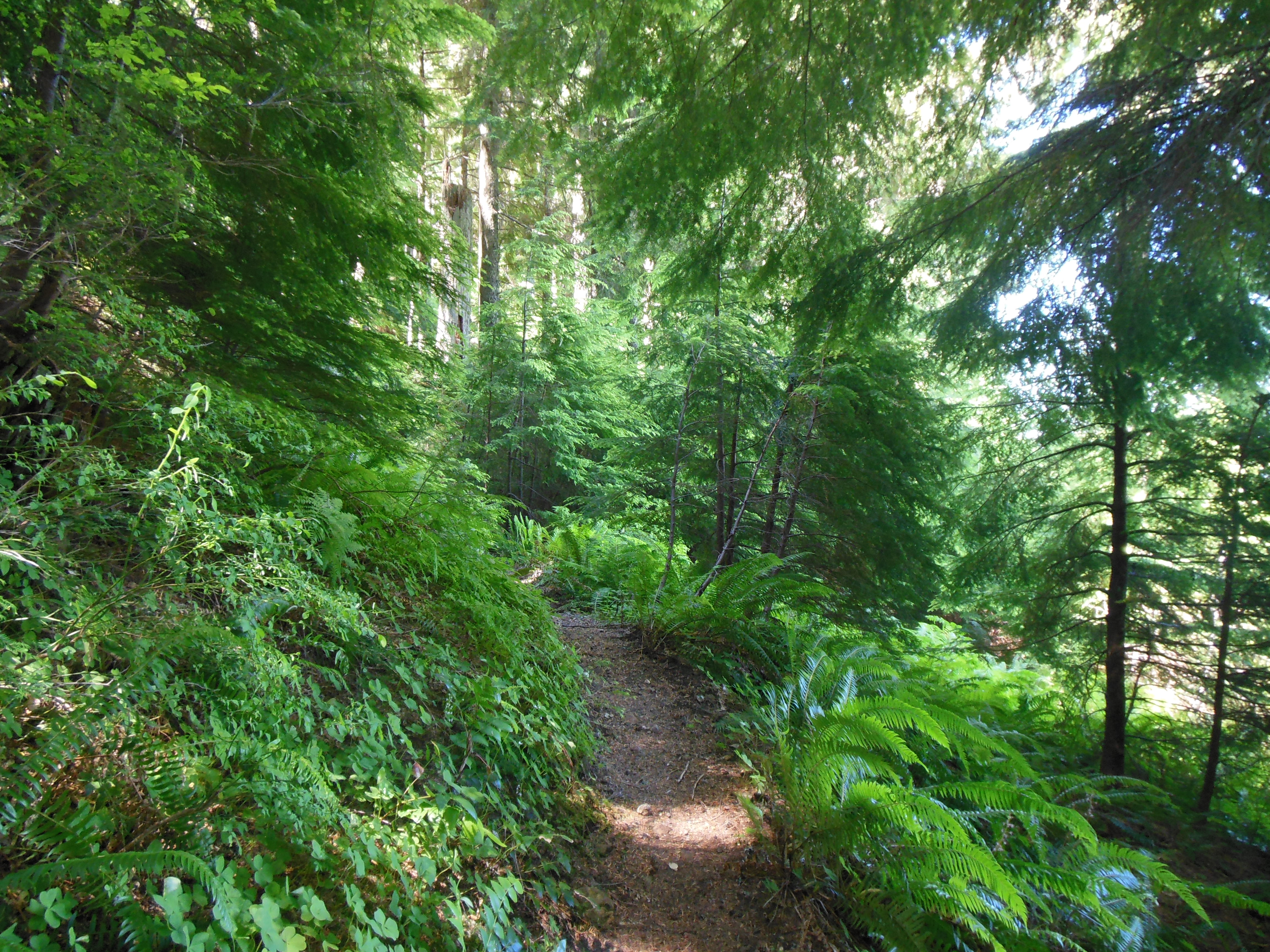
- A trail through dense vegetation in the Umpqua National Forest in the Cascade Range of southern Oregon, headquartered near Roseburg, Oregon (county seat town of Douglas County)

- Location within the United States
- Location: Douglas / Lane / Jackson counties, of Oregon, Western United States
- Nearest city: Roseburg, Oregon
- Coordinates: 43°13′21″N 122°15′15″W
- Area: 983,129 acres (3,978.58 km^{2})
- Established: July 2, 1907
- Visitors: 799,000 (in 2006)
- Governing body: United States Forest Service (U.S. Department of Agriculture)
- Website: Umpqua National Forest

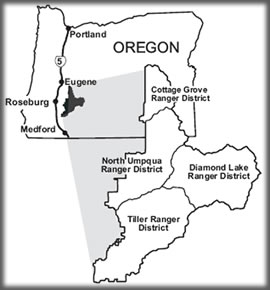
Umpqua National Forest vicinity map.

Umpqua National Forest, in southern Oregon's Cascade Range, covers an area of 983,129 acres (3,978.58 km^{2}) in Douglas, Lane, and Jackson counties, and borders the Crater Lake National Park in Southern Oregon. The four ranger districts for the forest are the Cottage Grove, Diamond Lake, North Umpqua, and Tiller ranger districts. The national forest is managed by the United States Forest Service (of the United States Department of Agriculture), headquartered in Roseburg (county seat town of Douglas County), Oregon in the Pacific Northwest region of the Western United States.

== Geography ==
Stands of western hemlock, true fir, Douglas-fir and cedar transition to lower-elevation forests of mixed conifers and hardwoods. Timbered valleys of old-growth ponderosa and groves of oak separate mountains like the 9,182-foot (2,799 m) Mount Thielsen and the 8,363-foot (2,549 m) Mount Bailey. Notable geologic features include volcanic basalt and andesite monolithic spires with descriptive names like Eagle Rock, Rattlesnake Rock, and Old Man.

== History ==
Ancestors of the Umpqua, Southern Molala, Yoncalla, and Cow Creek Band of Umpqua Tribe of Indians lived here before the ancient volcano of Mount Mazama erupted forming the modem Crater Lake nearly 7,000 years ago.

The Native Americans / Indian tribes were moved to nearby federal reservations in 1856, during the last years of the old federal Oregon Territory (1848–1859), before statehood and admittance to the federal Union as the 33rd state in 1859. European Americans (white) settlers bought reservation lands, the tribes further fragmented in subsequent decades to become farmers and ranchers in the Umpqua Valley of Southern Oregon. Two translations into the English language of the native / aboriginal word "umpqua" are "thundering waters" and "across the waters".

The Umpqua National Forest was created by the United States Congress and approved by the 26th President, Theodore Roosevelt (1858–1919, served 1901–1909), on July 2, 1907. The U.S. Forest Service staff of the U.S. Department of Agriculture soon began building trails, constructing bridges, fighting fires, monitoring grazing, and erecting fire protection lookouts. Logging and mining that were allowed began 18 years later in 1925. The Civilian Conservation Corps (C.C.C.) program set up by the New Deal to combat economic hardships and mass unemployment during the Great Depression of the 1930s in the presidential administration of 32nd President, Franklin D. Roosevelt (1882–1945, served 1933–1945), was active in the Umpqua National Forest by building roads, bridges and recreation facilities in the 1930s.

== Points of interest ==
The Umpqua National Forest is home to more than 250 wildlife species. Large mammals such as elk, deer, black bear, and cougar, as well as the smaller residents, squirrels, fox, raccoons, and bats are supported by the diverse forest habitats. Raptors such as owls, eagles, osprey, and even peregrine falcons can occasionally be seen in the forest. Coho and Chinook salmon and steelhead, rainbow, brown and cutthroat trout swim, feed and spawn in the rivers and streams of the forest.

A 1993 Forest Service study estimated that the extent of old growth in the national forest was 535,300 acres (216,600 ha), 82,200 acres (33,300 ha) of which were mountain hemlock (Tsuga mertensiana) forests.

Recreational activities allowed in the national forest include camping, fishing, hiking, horseback riding, hunting, mountain biking, rock climbing, and boating. Winter activities include both Nordic and downhill skiing, as well as snowshoeing and snowmobiling.

In 1988, the Oregon Omnibus Wild and Scenic Rivers Act designated a portion of the North Umpqua River as part of the National Wild and Scenic Rivers System. Twenty-six miles of the river run through the national forest.

The Rogue-Umpqua National Scenic Byway extends 172 miles (277 km) through the nearby Rogue River–Siskiyou and Umpqua national forests, as well as the Medford and Roseburg districts of the Bureau of Land Management (B.L.M.) of the United States Department of the Interior and private lands.

== Wilderness areas ==
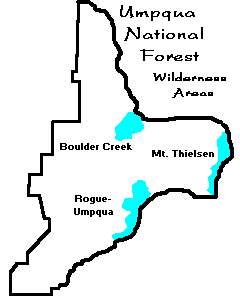
Map of wilderness areas in the Umpqua National Forest.

The Umpqua National Forest contains three wilderness areas: Boulder Creek, Rogue-Umpqua Divide, and Mount Thielsen.

=== Boulder Creek ===
Boulder Creek is a 19,100-acre (77 km^{2}) wilderness area located 50 miles (80 km) east of Roseburg. One popular area in Boulder Creek is Pine Bench. A flat area overlooking Boulder Creek, Pine Bench is home to a grove of majestic old growth ponderosa pines. In 1996 the Spring Fire burned 16,500 acres (67 km^{2}) in the Boulder Creek Wilderness.

=== Rogue-Umpqua Divide ===
The Rogue-Umpqua Divide is a 33,000-acre (130 km^{2}) wilderness area, 26,350 acres (106.6 km^{2}) of which is inside the National Forest. (About 17% of it lies within Rogue River–Siskiyou National Forest.) Located 80 miles (130 km) east of Roseburg, the Rogue-Umpqua Divide ranges in elevation from 3,200 to 6,878 feet (2,096 m) and separates the drainages of the Rogue and Umpqua rivers. The wilderness includes sub-alpine meadows and old-growth forests.

=== Mount Thielsen ===
Mount Thielsen is a 55,100-acre (223 km^{2}) wilderness area, 21,593 acres (87.38 km^{2}) of which is located inside the National Forest. (The rest lies in either Winema National Forest or Deschutes National Forest.) Located 80 miles (130 km) east of Roseburg, this wilderness area is the largest in the Umpqua. The 9,182-foot (2,799 m) Mt. Thielsen was born of the same volcanic activity that created Crater Lake and some trails pass over deep pumice that was deposited when Mt. Mazama erupted. The Pacific Crest Trail passes through the middle of the wilderness area.

== See also ==
- List of national forests of the United States
- High Cascades Complex Fires
